= Mersch District =

Former district in Luxembourg

Coordinates: 49°45′N 6°06′E

Mersch District was one of the four districts of Luxembourg between 1857 and 1867. It took its name from its administrative centre, the town of Mersch, and contained the cantons of Mersch and Redange. It is the only district to have been created after the initial establishment, and was the only district to have been abolished before they all were in 2015.

The district was created on 30 May 1857. The canton of Mersch was taken from Luxembourg District, whilst Redange canton was taken from Diekirch District. However, this fourth district was abolished only ten years later, on 4 May 1867; the 1857 law was repealed, and the previous three districts were recreated as before.

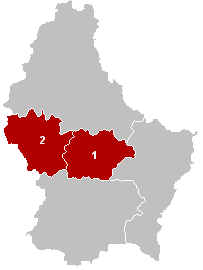
The district of Mersch existed from 1857 until 1867, and included the cantons of Mersch (1) and Redange (2).

== Cantons and communes ==
1. Mersch
  - Bissen
  - Boevange-sur-Attert
  - Berg
  - Fischbach
  - Heffingen
  - Larochette
  - Lintgen
  - Lorentzweiler
  - Mersch
  - Nommern
  - Tuntange
2. Redange
  - Arsdorf
  - Beckerich
  - Bettborn
  - Bigonville
  - Ell
  - Folschette
  - Grosbous
  - Perlé
  - Redange
  - Saeul
  - Useldange
  - Vichten
