= Oberpallen =

Coordinates: 49°44′N 5°51′E

Oberpallen Uewerpallen
- Former commune of Luxembourg
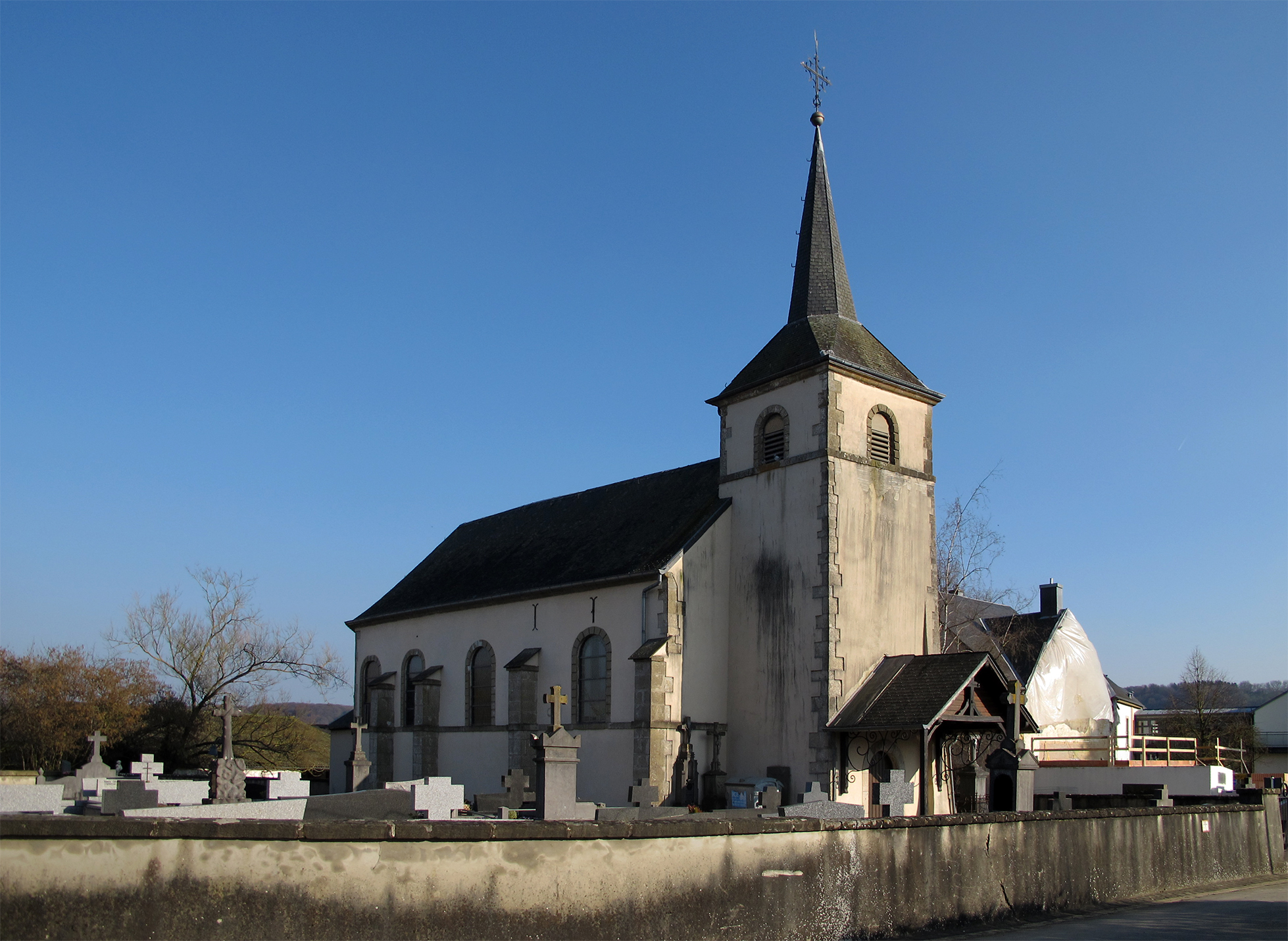
- Interactive map of Oberpallen
- Country: Luxembourg
- District: Diekirch
- Canton: Redange
- Created: Original commune
- Abolished: 25 July 1846
- Currently: Part of Beckerich

Oberpallen (Luxembourgish: Uewerpallen) is a small town in the commune of Beckerich, in western Luxembourg. As of September 2026, the town had a population of 439.

Oberpallen was a commune in the canton of Redange until 25 July 1846, when it was merged into the commune of Beckerich.

Since fuel, tobacco, and alcohol taxes are lower in Luxembourg than in Belgium, many Belgians cross the border to get easy discounts there. In this respect, Oberpallen is like Steinfort and Martelange.

== Former commune ==
The former commune consisted of the villages:

- Dideling
- Levelange
- Oberpallen
