= Rombach, Luxembourg =

Coordinates: 49°50′N 5°45′E

- Village
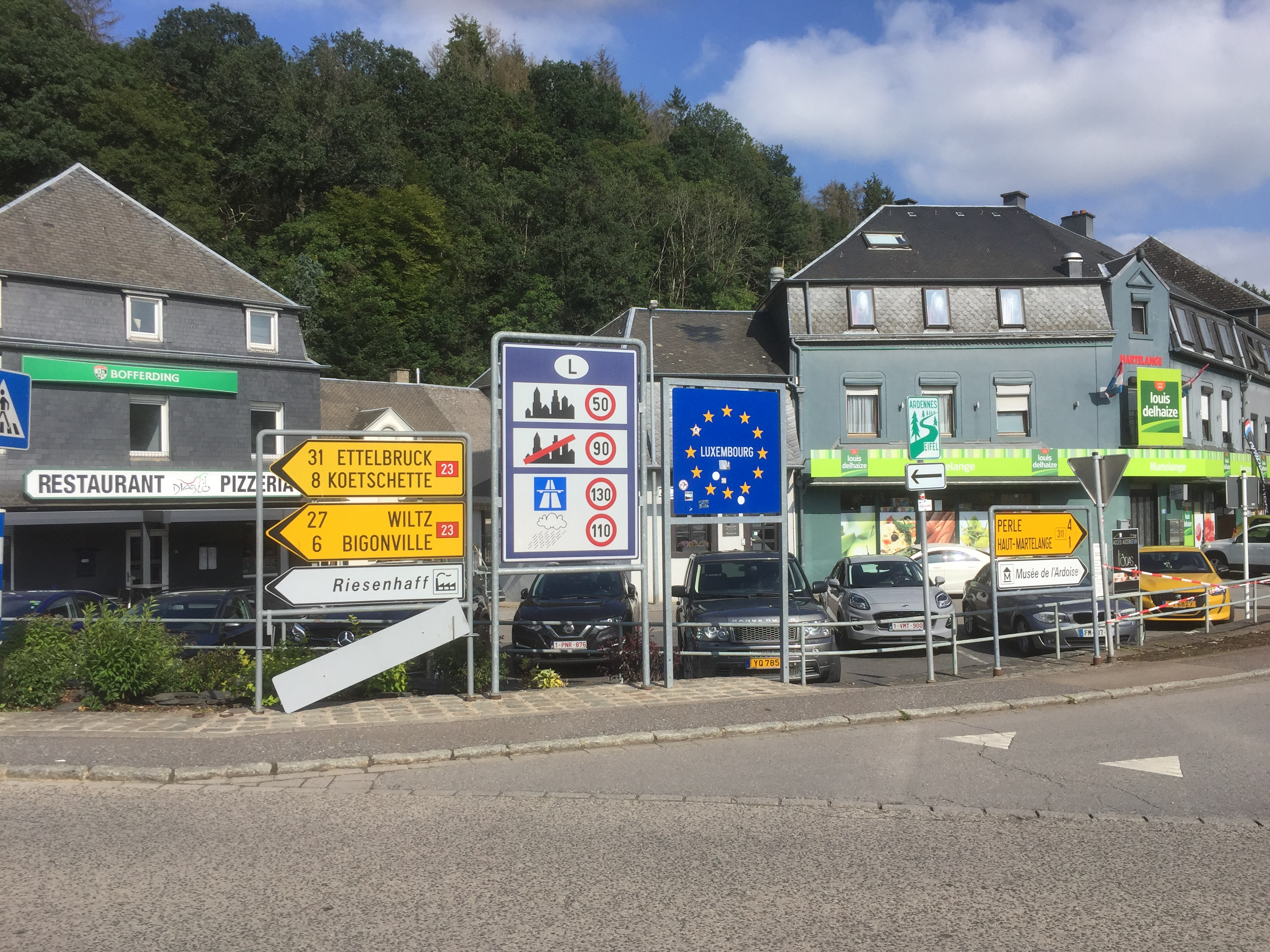
- National Route 4 in Martelange
- Interactive map of Rombach, Luxembourg
- Country: Luxembourg
- Canton: Redange
- Commune: Rambrouch

Population
  - Total: 209
- Time zone: UTC+1 (CET)
  - Summer (DST): UTC+2 (CEST)

Rombach - Martelange (Luxembourgish: Rombech) is a small town in the commune of Rambrouch, in western Luxembourg. As of September 2026, the town had a population of 222.

== Geography ==
Rombach is uniquely situated directly on the border with Belgium, forming a continuous built-up area with the Belgian municipality of Martelange. The international boundary is defined by the Belgian National Route 4 (N4), which runs north-south through the valley. The buildings on the western side of the street belong to Martelange, Belgium, while the eastern side of the road falls under the jurisdiction of Rombach, Luxembourg.

Because of differing taxation laws between the two countries, Rombach's side of the N4 is well-known for its dense concentration of border gas stations, as well as alcohol, tobacco, and coffee shops catering to cross-border commuters.

== History ==
=== Scission of the village ===
Originally, Rombach and Martelange formed a single village within the Grand Duchy of Luxembourg, which had been the private property of William I of Orange-Nassau since the 1815 Congress of Vienna. Following the Belgian Revolution, the first Treaty of the Eighteen Articles in 1831 intended for the entirety of Martelange to remain Luxembourgish. However, largely due to the intercession of Constant d'Hoffschmidt, a Belgian representative, the decision was made to split the village.

On April 19, 1839, the Treaty of XXIV Articles formally drew the border along the Arlon-Bastogne road (the modern N4). The western side formed the Belgian municipality of Martelange, while the eastern side became the Luxembourgish village of Rombach-Martelange, which was subsequently integrated into the commune of Perlé.

=== Industrial era and the Jangeli railway ===
During the 19th and early 20th centuries, Rombach and the neighboring area of Haut-Martelange (Obermartelingen) flourished due to the local slate industry. Numerous slate quarries were established, driving local infrastructure and commerce.

To support the region's industry and passenger transport, the Jangeli narrow-gauge railway (officially the Noerdange–Rombach cantonal line) was inaugurated on November 18, 1890. The 29.5-kilometre (18.3 mi) meter-gauge track connected Rombach to Noerdange. Curiously, the terminus at Rombach was located just 100 meters away from the Belgian Martelange railway station. Although both railways utilized the same 1-metre gauge, the tracks were never connected across the border. The line was gradually replaced by bus services starting in 1952 and officially closed on February 16, 1953.

=== 1967 Martelange catastrophe ===
On August 21, 1967, Rombach and Martelange were devastated by a tragic accident. A truck descending the steep hill of the N4 route lost control and crashed into the border village. The truck, carrying over 40,000 liters of liquefied gas, exploded upon impact. The blast and subsequent fires ravaged dozens of homes and ignited several gas stations along the Luxembourgish side of the border. The catastrophe claimed 22 lives and left 59 others severely injured. Luxembourg firefighters, being the nearest station to the scene, were the first to respond and were soon joined by their Belgian counterparts in a major cross-border rescue effort.

=== Modern administration ===
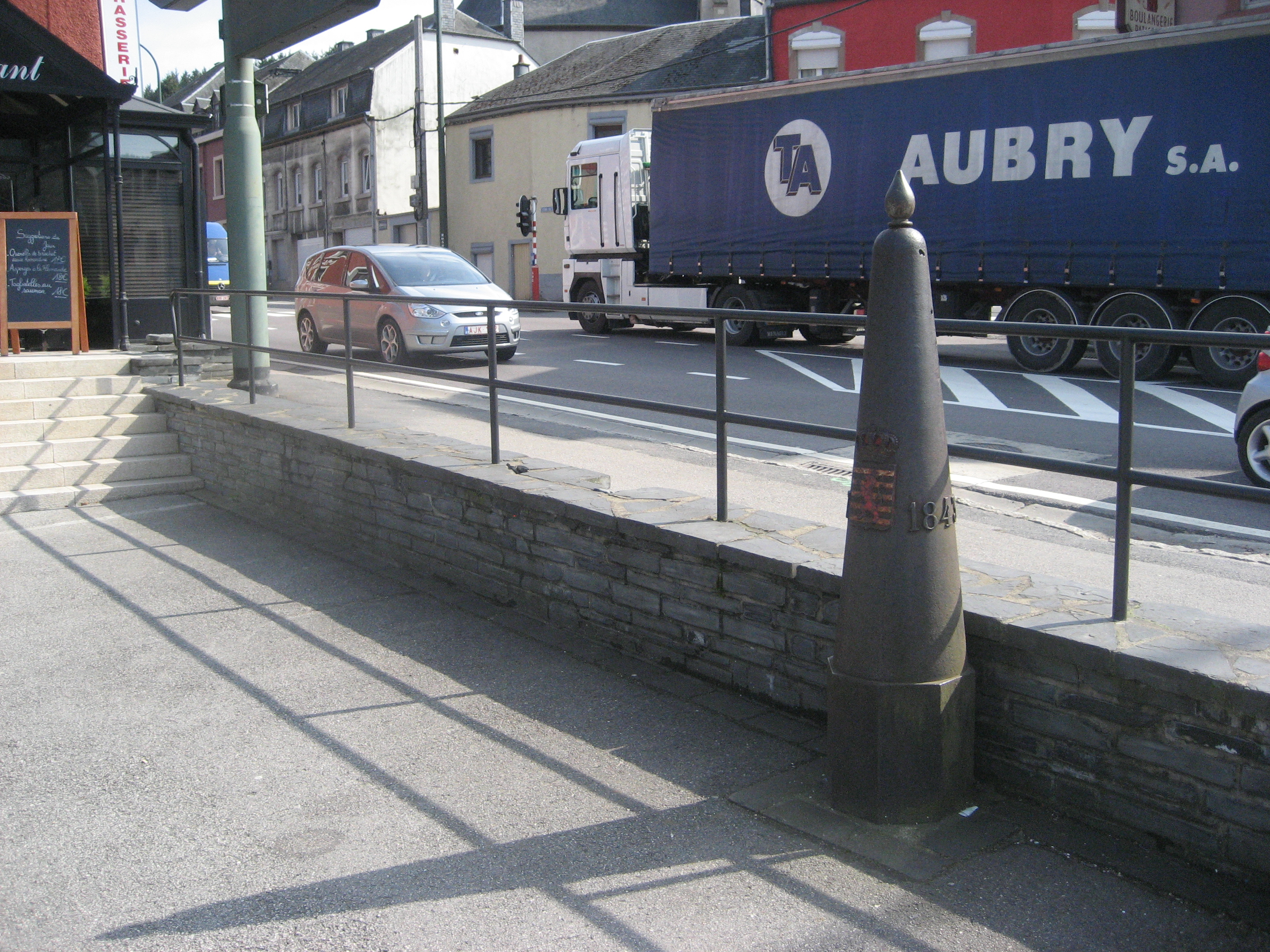
Border marker LB 168 in Martelange between Belgium and Luxembourg

Until the late 1970s, Rombach belonged to the commune of Perlé. On January 1, 1979, an administrative reorganization merged the communes of Perlé, Arsdorf, Bigonville, and Folschette to create the new, larger commune of Rambrouch, of which Rombach remains a constituent village today.
