= Angelsberg =

Angelsberg Angelsbierg
- Town
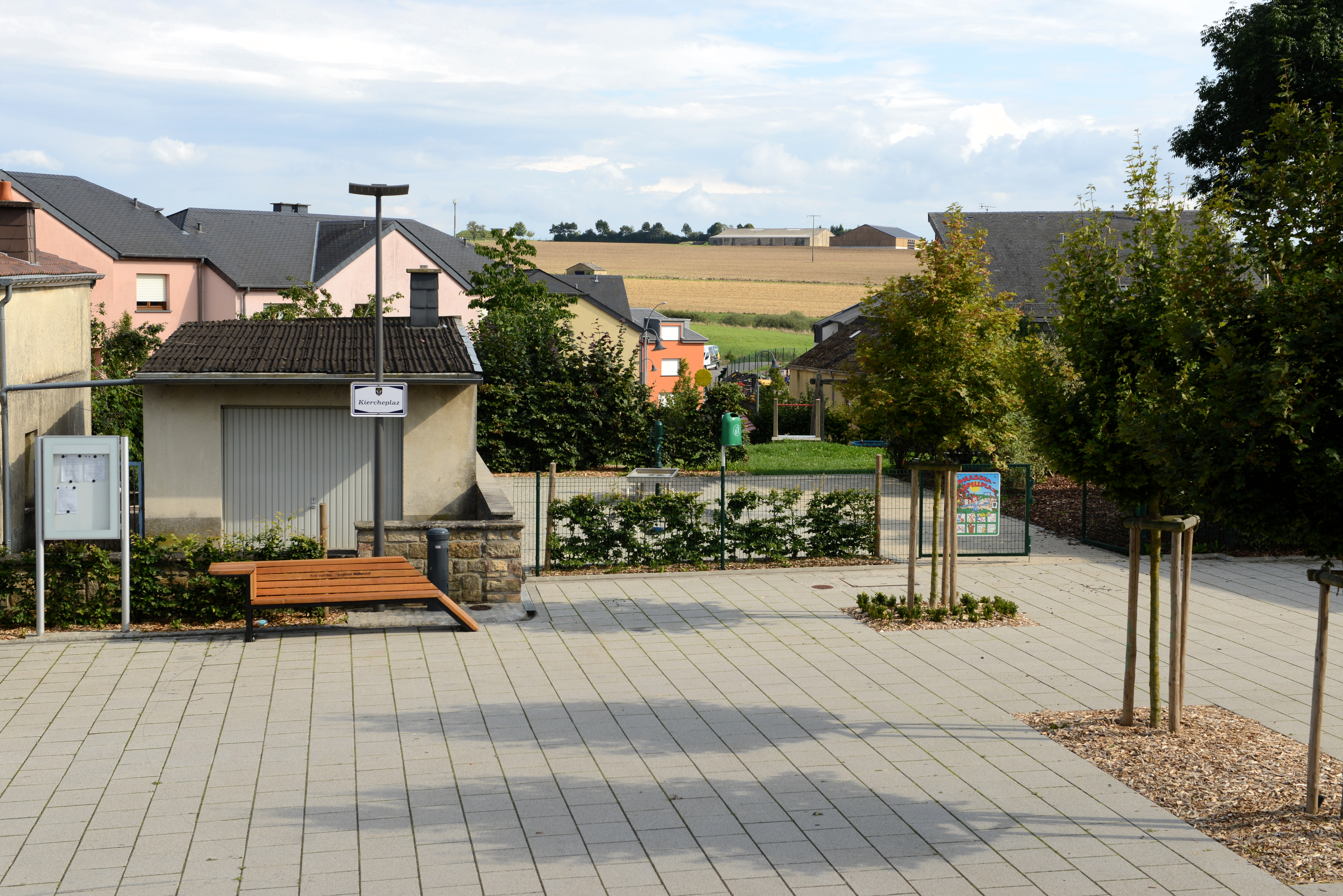
- View of Angelsberg (2014)

- Location within Luxembourg
- Coordinates: 49.763°N 6.158°E
- Country: Luxembourg
- District: Luxembourg
- Canton: Mersch
- Commune: Fischbach

Population (2024)
  - Total: 483

Angelsberg (Luxembourgish: Angelsbierg) is a small town in the commune of Fischbach, in central Luxembourg. As of September 2026, the town had a population of 517.

== Location ==
Angelsberg is 5 km east of Mersch on the CR 118. Other neighboring towns are the Beringerberg settlement to the north and Schoos to the south. To the east of the village is Meysemburg Castle.

== History ==
The oldest street in Angelsberg is the Rue de L'Eglise, on which the Church of St. Cornelius is located. In the 18th and 19th centuries it was the main road of the town, and led via a country road to Mersch. A few houses from the 18th century have been preserved here. The church itself is younger and was built in 1885 according to plans by architect Carl (Charles) Arendt in the neo-Romanesque style. It replaced a previous building from 1570, which had to be demolished in 1883 due to dilapidation.

The Rue de Mersch was the next road created.

== Wikipedia controversy ==
The English Wikipedia article for the town appeared to be among the most viewed articles on the site for several months during 2015, getting hundreds of thousands of views every day. Research into the phenomenon found that the majority of article traffic was from a suspected mobile botnet, and the article was excluded from the 2015 top articles list.
