= ISO 3166-2:LU =

Entry for Luxembourg in ISO 3166-2

ISO 3166-2:LU is the entry for Luxembourg in ISO 3166-2, part of the ISO 3166 standard published by the International Organization for Standardization (ISO), which defines codes for the names of the principal subdivisions (e.g., provinces or states) of all countries coded in ISO 3166-1.

Currently for Luxembourg, ISO 3166-2 codes are defined for 12 cantons.

Each code consists of two parts, separated by a hyphen. The first part is LU, the ISO 3166-1 alpha-2 code of Luxembourg. The second part is two letters.

== Current codes ==
Subdivision names are listed as in the ISO 3166-2 standard published by the ISO 3166 Maintenance Agency (ISO 3166/MA).

ISO 639-1 codes are used to represent subdivision names in the following administrative languages:

- (fr): French
- (de): German
- (lb): Luxembourgish

Click on the button in the header to sort each column.

Code	Subdivision name (fr)	Subdivision name (de)	Subdivision name (lb)
LU-CA	Capellen	Capellen	Kapellen
LU-CL	Clervaux	Clerf	Klierf
LU-DI	Diekirch	Diekirch	Diekrech
LU-EC	Echternach	Echternach	Iechternach
LU-ES	Esch-sur-Alzette	Esch an der Alzette	Esch-Uelzecht
LU-GR	Grevenmacher	Grevenmacher	Gréivemaacher
LU-LU	Luxembourg	Luxemburg	Lëtzebuerg
LU-ME	Mersch	Mersch	Miersch
LU-RD	Redange	Redingen	Réiden-Atert
LU-RM	Remich	Remich	Réimech
LU-VD	Vianden	Vianden	Veianen
LU-WI	Wiltz	Wiltz	Wolz

== Former codes ==
Prior to 2015, ISO 3166-2 codes were defined for three districts.

Click on the button in the header to sort each column.

Former code	Subdivision name
LU-D	Diekirch (de, lb)
LU-G	Grevenmacher (de, lb)
LU-L	Luxembourg (fr), Luxemburg (de), Lëtzebuerg (lb)

== See also ==
- Subdivisions of Luxembourg
- FIPS region codes of Luxembourg
- NUTS codes of Luxembourg
- Neighbouring countries: BE, DE, FR
