= Mersch (disambiguation) =

Mersch is a commune in Luxembourg.

Mersch may also refer to:

== Places ==
- Mersch (canton), a canton of Luxembourg centered on Mersch
- Mersch District, a former district of Luxembourg centered on Mersch

== People ==
- Arsène Mersch (1913–1980), a Luxembourgish cyclist
- Jean Mersch-Wittenauer (1819–1879), a Luxembourgish politician and Mayor of Luxembourg City
- Jules Mersch (1898–1973), a Luxembourgish publisher and writer
- Michael J. Mersch (1868–1954), an American politician
- Yves Mersch (born 1949), a Luxembourgish economist and former board member of the European Central Bank
