= Arsdorf =

Village and former commune in Luxembourg

Arsdorf Ueschdref
- Village
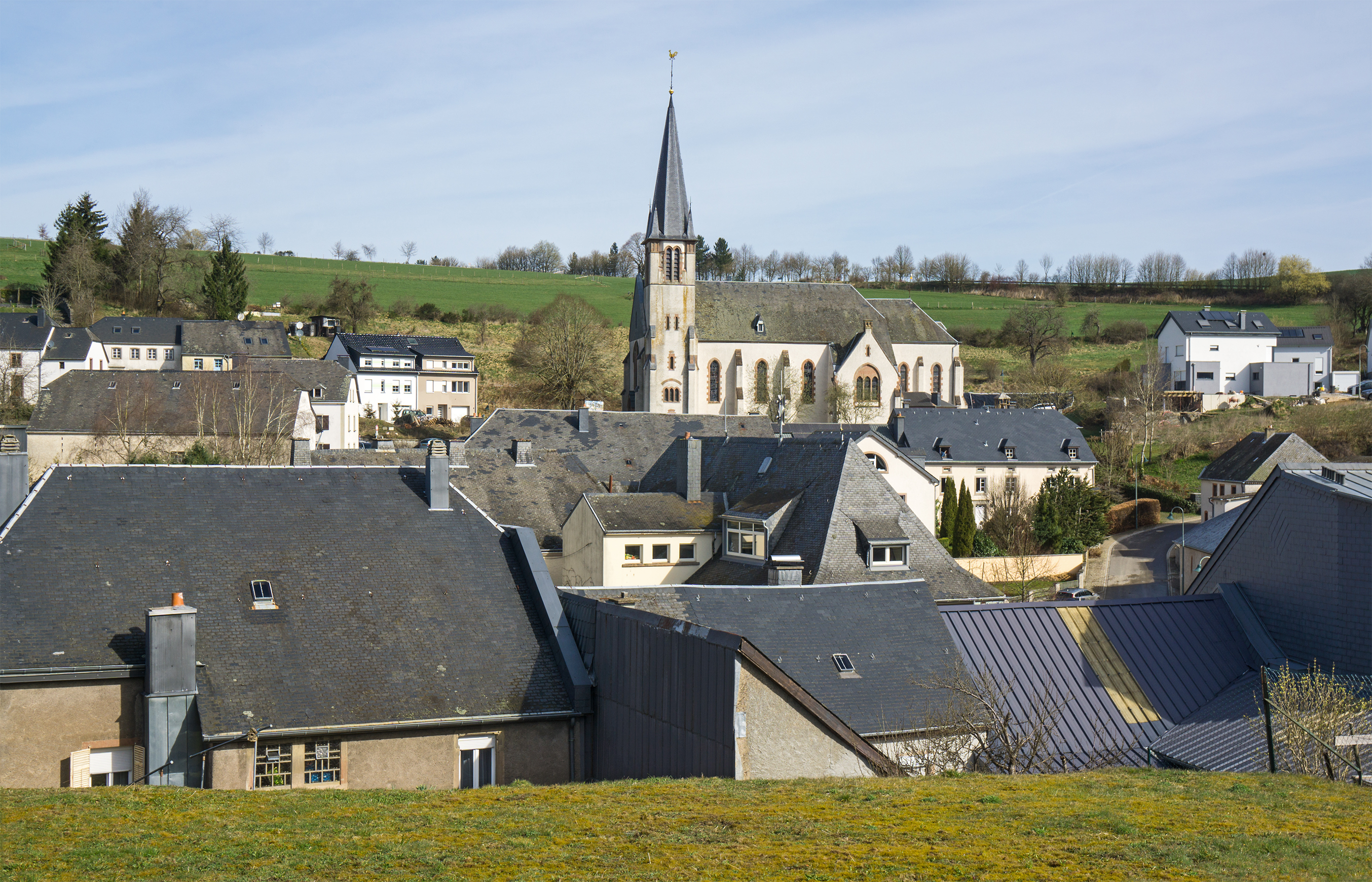
- Church over the roofs of Arsdorf
- Interactive map of Arsdorf
- Country: Luxembourg
- District: Diekirch
- Canton: Redange
- Created: Original commune
- Abolished: 1 January 1979
- Currently: Part of Rambrouch

Arsdorf (Luxembourgish: Ueschdref) is a village in the commune of Rambrouch, in western Luxembourg. As of September 2026, the village had a population of 433.

Arsdorf was a commune in the canton of Redange until 1 January 1979, when it was merged with the communes of Bigonville, Folschette, and Perlé to form the new commune of Rambrouch. The law creating Rambrouch was passed on 27 July 1978.

== See also ==
- List of villages in Luxembourg
