= Schweich (disambiguation) =

Schweich may refer to:

- Schweich, city in Rhineland-Palatinate, Germany
- Schweich an der Römischen Weinstraße, Verbandsgemeinde in Rhineland-Palatinate, Germany
- Schweich, Luxembourg, village in western Luxembourg

== Uses ==
- Schweich Lectures on Biblical Archaeology, series of the British Academy

== People ==
- Constance Schweich (1869–1951), British philanthropist and patron of the arts
- Tom Schweich (1960–2015), American politician, diplomat, attorney, and author
