= Napoléonsgaard =

Hill in western Luxembourg

Napoleonsgaart
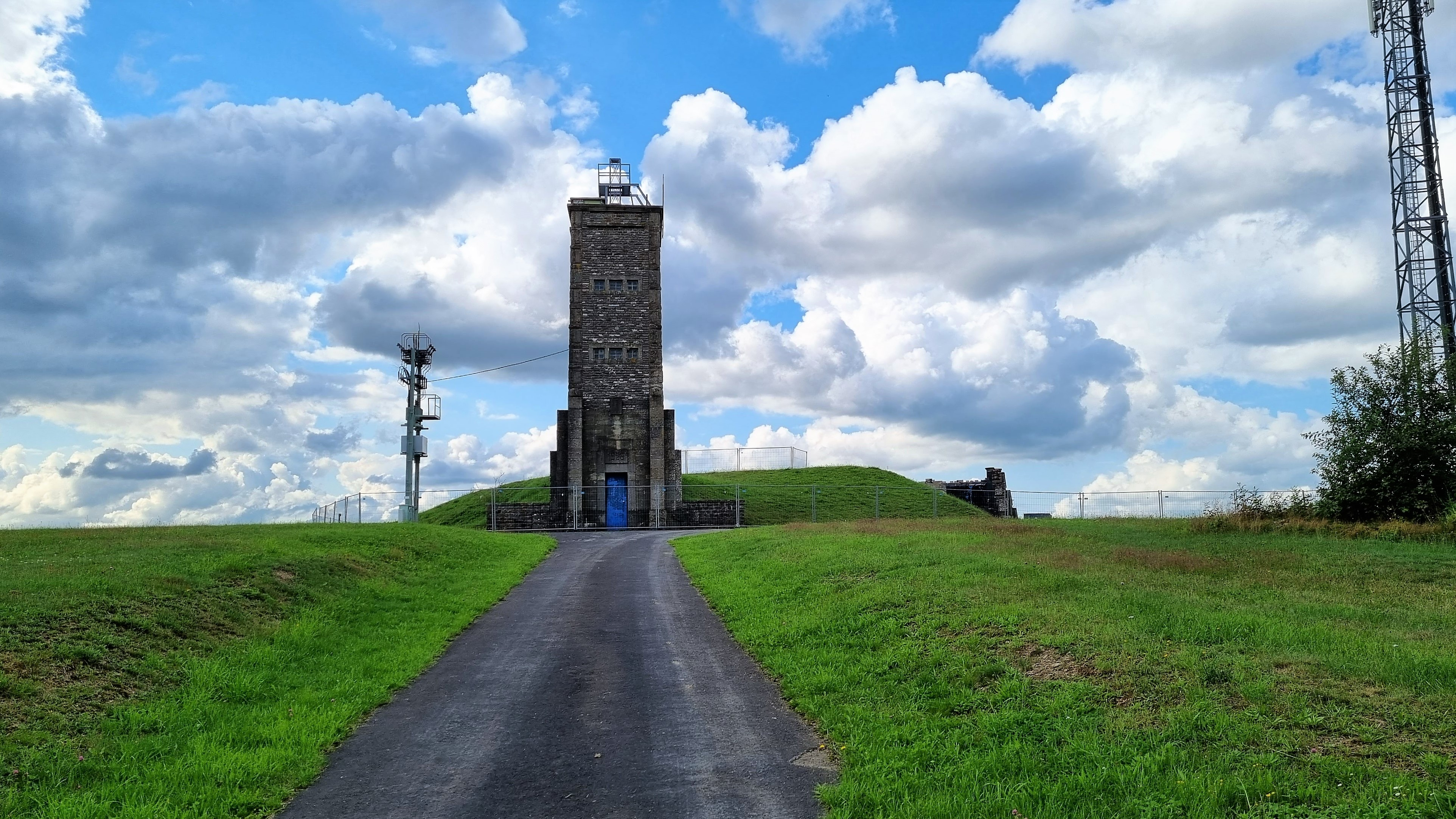
- The summit of Napoleonsgaart

Highest point
- Elevation: 547 m (1,795 ft)
- Coordinates: 49°50′55″N 5°53′5″E

Geography
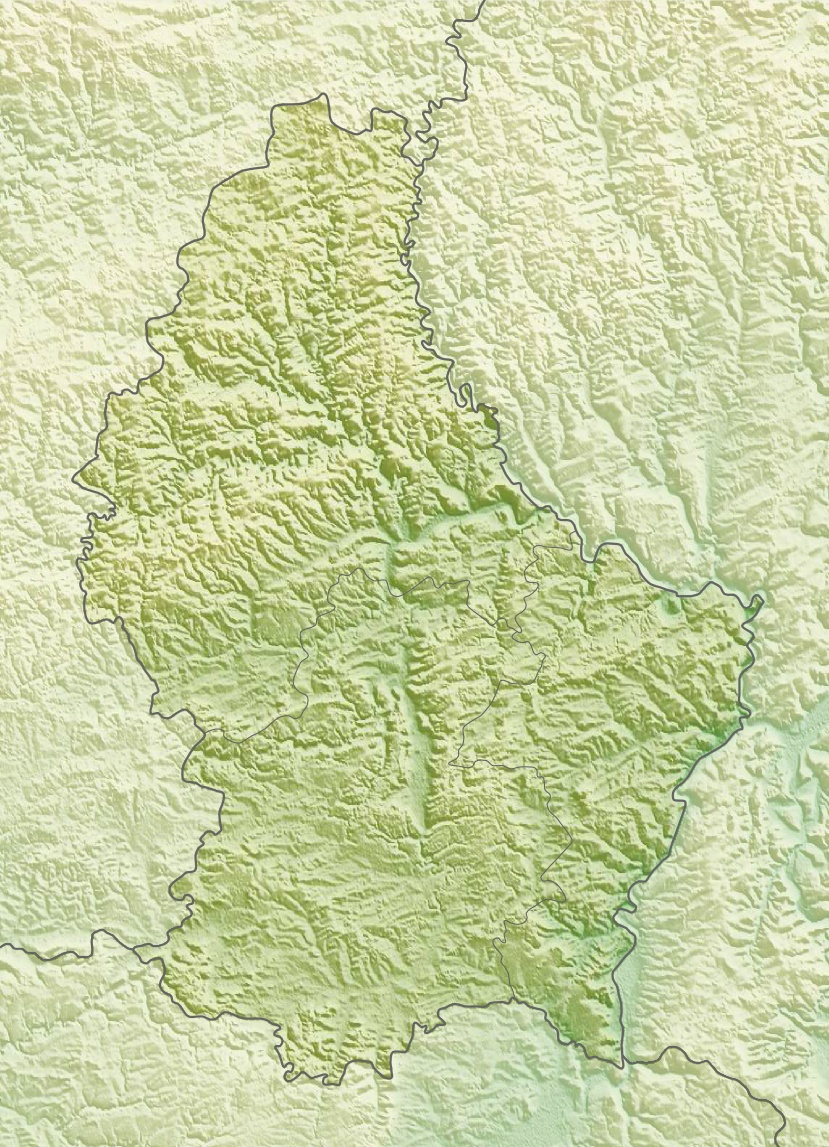
- Location within Luxembourg
- Location: Canton Redange, Luxembourg
- Parent range: Oesling, Ardennes

Geology
- Mountain type: Hill
- Rock type: Slate

Napoleonsgaart is a hill in the commune of Rambrouch, in western Luxembourg. It is 554 metres (1,818 ft) tall, and lies to the north-east of Schwiedelbrouch.

Napoleonsgaart is the third-highest summit in Luxembourg and the highest point in the Canton of Redange.

== History ==
Napoleonsgaart (literally: "garden of Napoléon") is so-named from the plantations that were made there on the order of Napoléon Bonaparte to honor the birth of his first son in 1811 at the supposed highest point of the Département des Forêts.

Between 1905 and 1952, Napoleonsgaart was considered the highest point in Luxembourg. It was superseded by Buurgplaatz 559 m (1,834 ft) which was itself superseded by Kneiff 560 m (1,840 ft) in 1997.
