= Bigonville =

Town and former commune in Luxembourg

Coordinates: 49°51′N 5°48′E

Bigonville Bungeref
- Former commune of Luxembourg

- Map of Luxembourg with the former commune highlighted in orange, and the canton in dark red
- Country: Luxembourg
- District: Diekirch
- Canton: Redange
- Created: Original commune
- Abolished: 1 January 1979
- Currently: Part of Rambrouch

Bigonville (French pronunciation: [biɡɔ̃vil]; Luxembourgish: Bungeref, German: Bondorf) is a small town in the commune of Rambrouch, in western Luxembourg, near the border with Belgium. As of September 2026, the town has a population of 570.

Bigonville was a commune in the canton of Redange until 1 January 1979, when it was merged with the communes of Arsdorf, Folschette, and Perlé to form the new commune of Rambrouch. The law creating Rambrouch was passed on 27 July 1978.

On 23 December 1944, as part of the larger Battle of the Bulge, the 4th Armored Division along with supporting elements engaged from the south of Bigonville the 5th Fallschirmjäger Division. On 24 December, the 4th Armored Division's 37th Tank Battalion (commanded by then Lieutenant Colonel Creighton Abrams) and 53rd Armored Infantry Battalion entered Bigonville and cleared out the Fallschirmjägers. On 25 December, the sector fell under the control of the 26th Infantry Division. A memorial exists in Bigonville, honoring the 4th Armored Division.

== Use in popular culture ==
Bigonville is the home of a professional Quidditch team, the Bigonville Bombers, operating within the fictional Harry Potter universe.
