= Huttange =

Village in Luxembourg

Coordinates: 49°44′09″N 5°53′51″E

Huttange Hitten
- Village
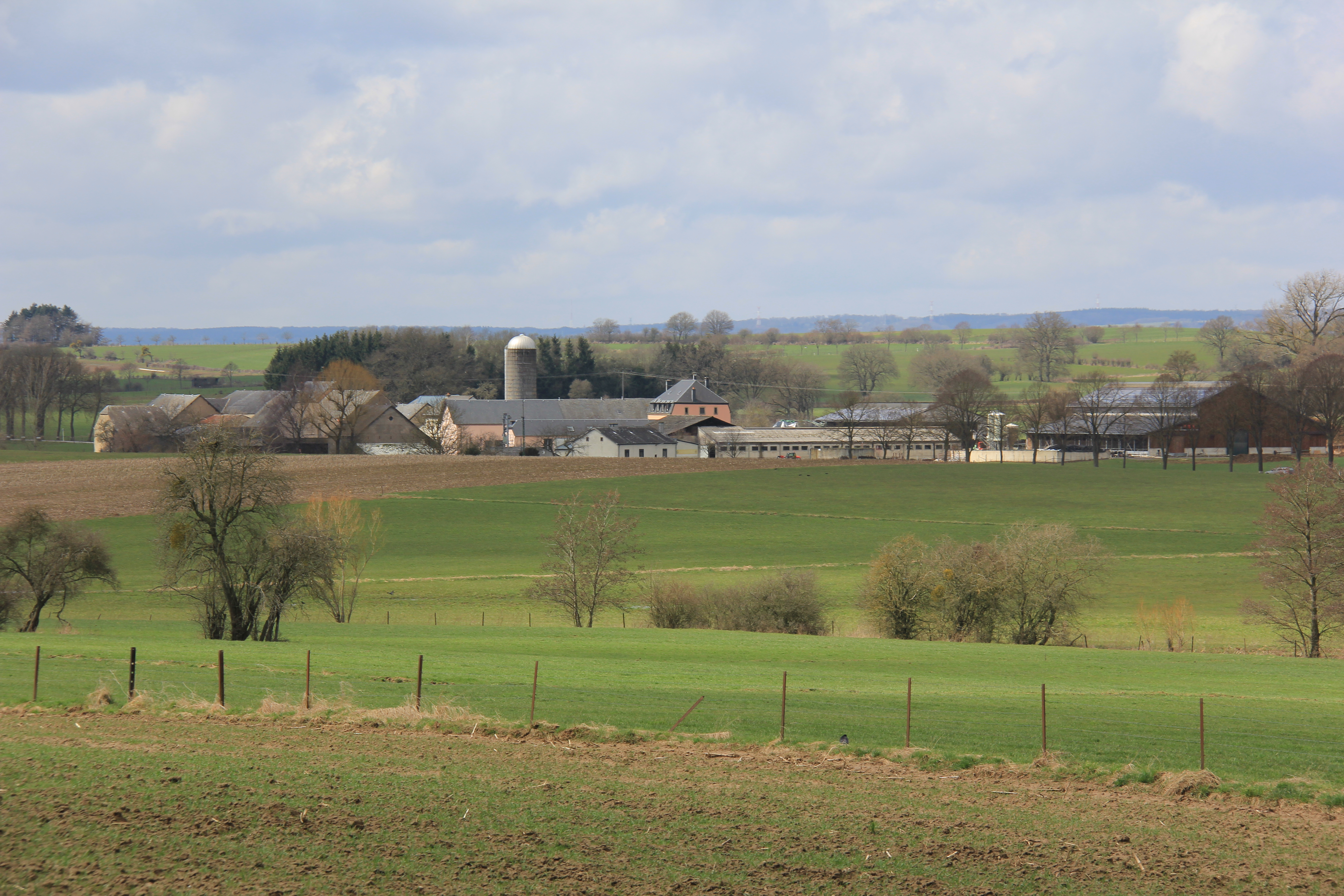
- View over Huttange
- Interactive map of Huttange
- Country: Luxembourg
- Canton: Redange
- Commune: Beckerich

Population
  - Total: 26
- Time zone: UTC+1 (CET)
  - Summer (DST): UTC+2 (CEST)

Huttange (German pronunciation: [ytɑ̃ʒ]; Luxembourgish: Hitten) is a village in northwestern Luxembourg.

It is situated in the commune of Beckerich and has a population of 29 as of 2026.

== Gallery ==
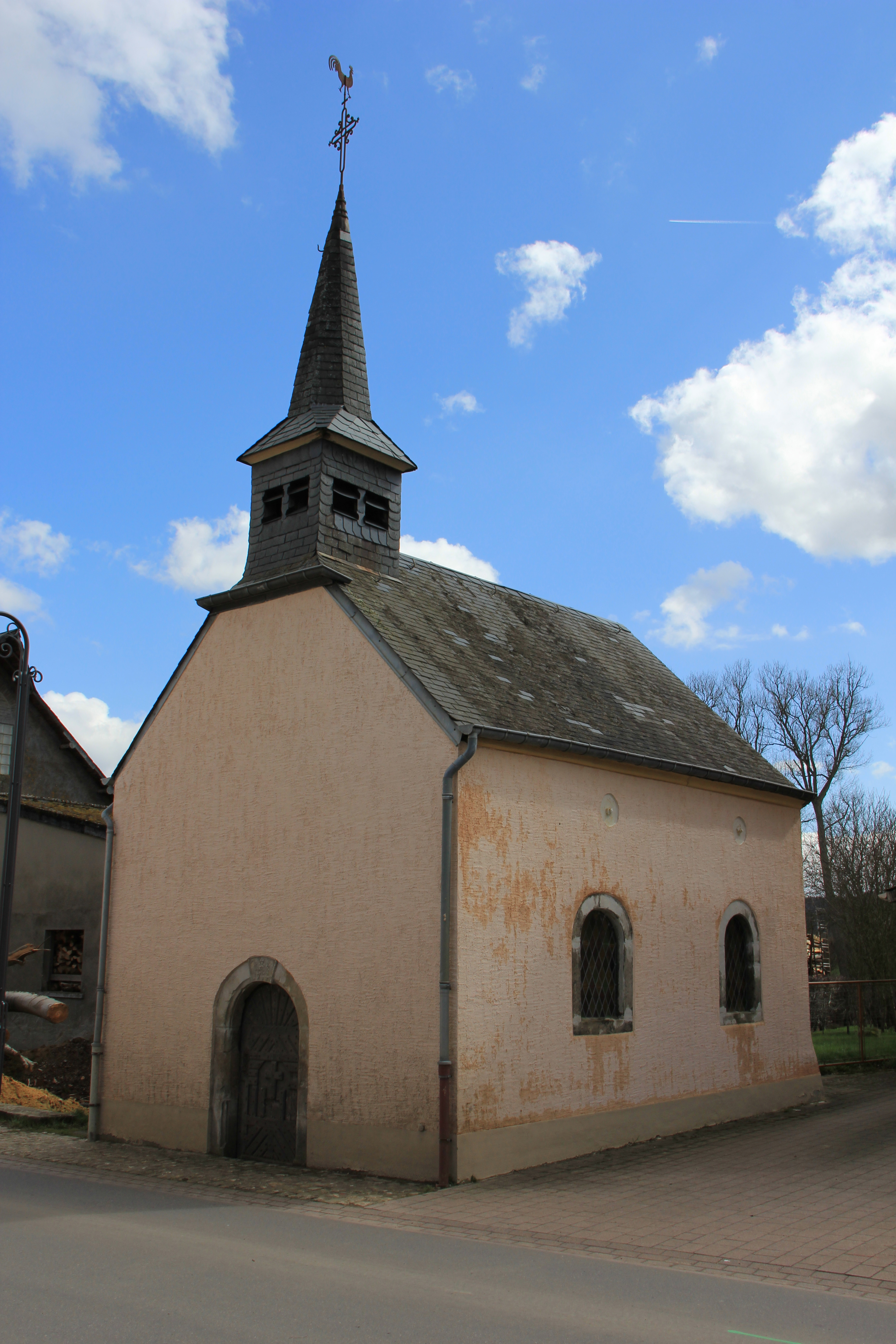
Chapel of Huttange

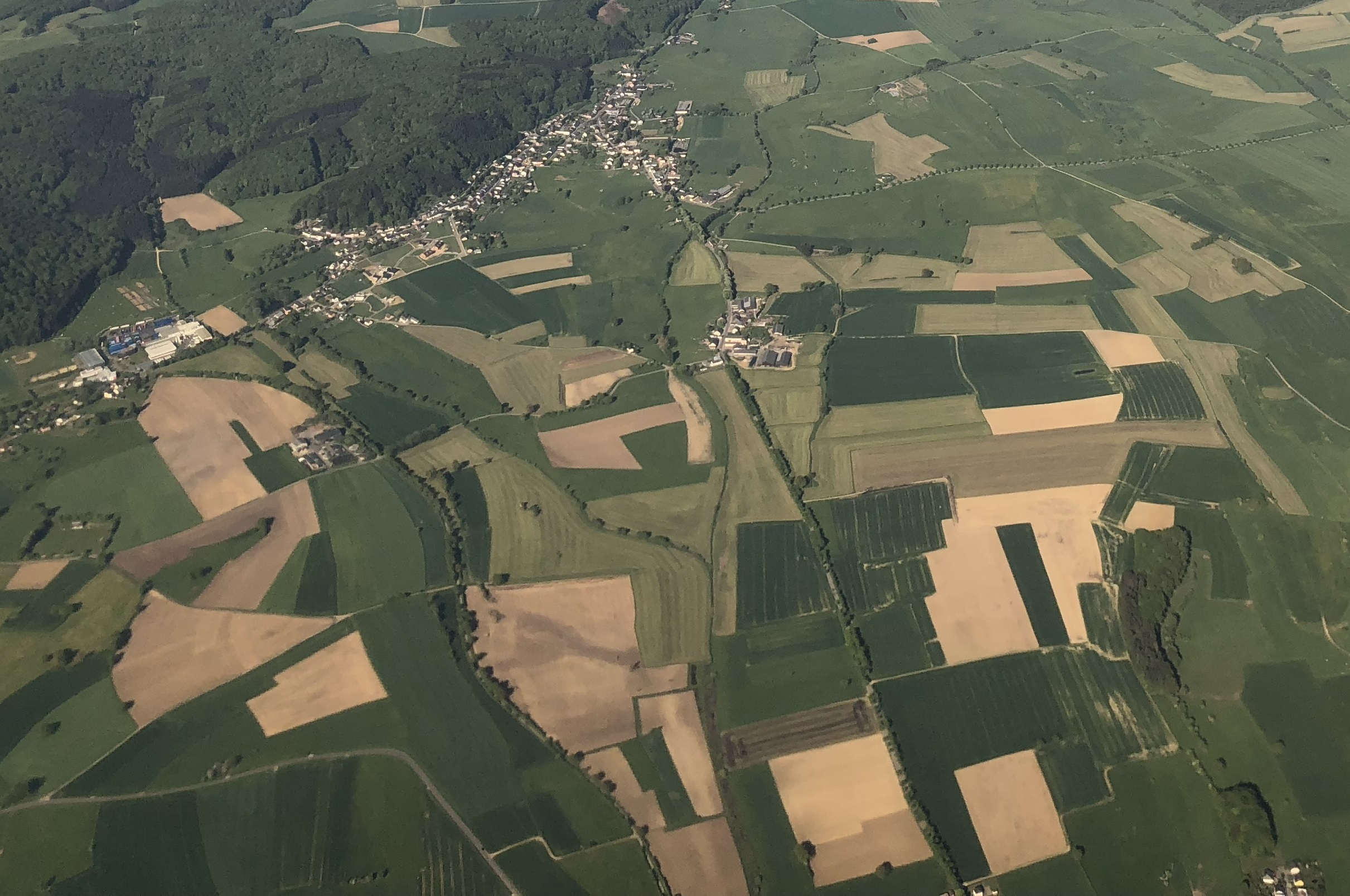
Aerial view of Beckerich and Huttange
