= Rombach =

Rombach may refer to:

- Heinrich Rombach (1923–2004), German philosopher
- Severin Louis Rombach (1914–1942), American naval aviator
- Rombach, Luxembourg, a village in Luxembourg
- Rombach (Rom River), German name of the river in the Val Müstair, in Switzerland and Italy
- USS Rombach, a ship (destroyer escort) acquired by the U.S. Navy during World War II
- Rombach (Aal), a river of Baden-Württemberg, Germany, headstream of the Aal
- Rombach (Liederbach), river of Hesse, Germany, tributary of the Liederbach
- Rombach Place, a historic house in the city of Wilmington, Ohio, United States
- Rombach-le-Franc, a commune in the Haut-Rhin department in north-eastern France
