= Dippach =

Dippach Dippech (Luxembourgish)
- Commune
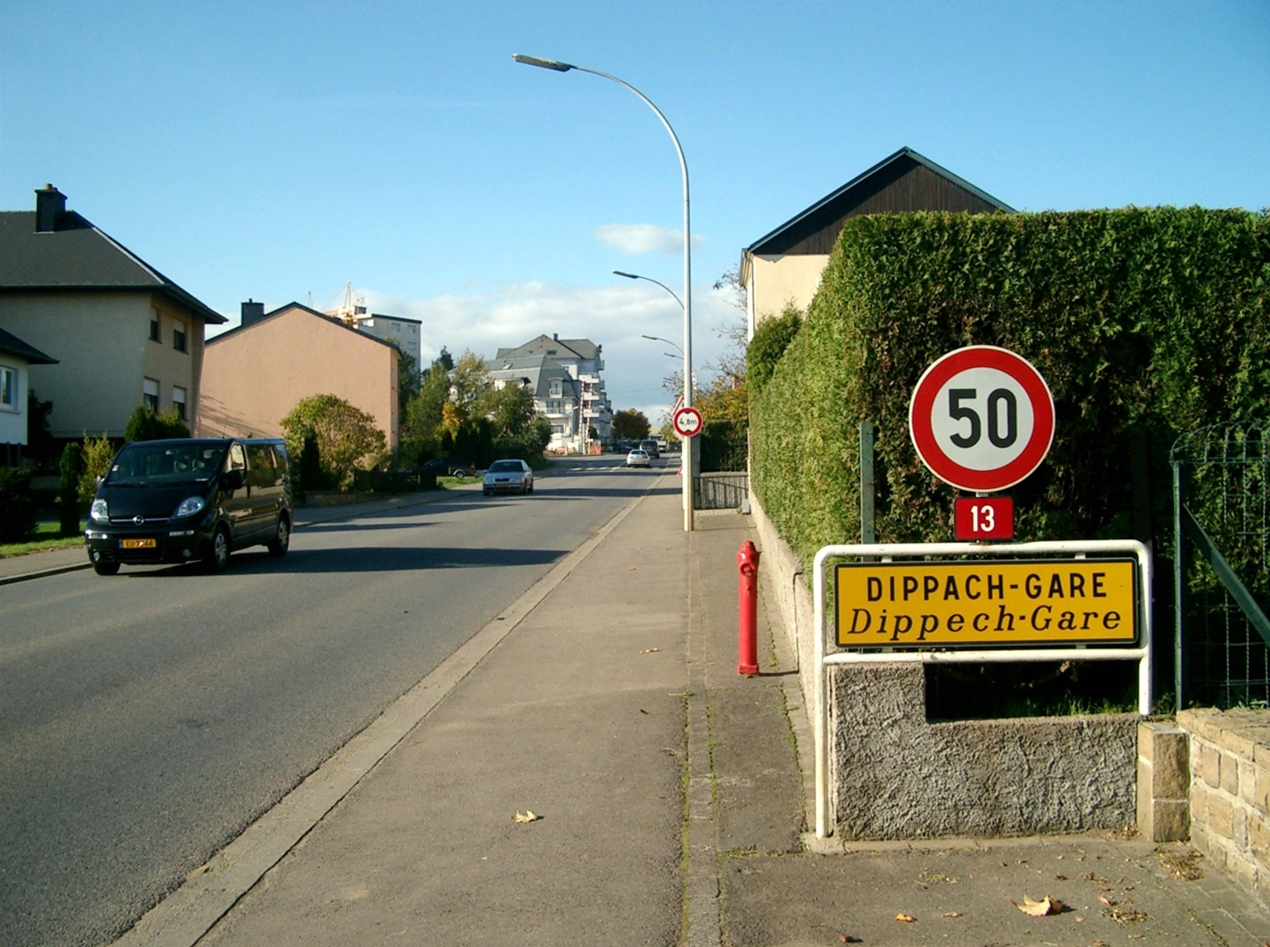
- Dippach-Gare

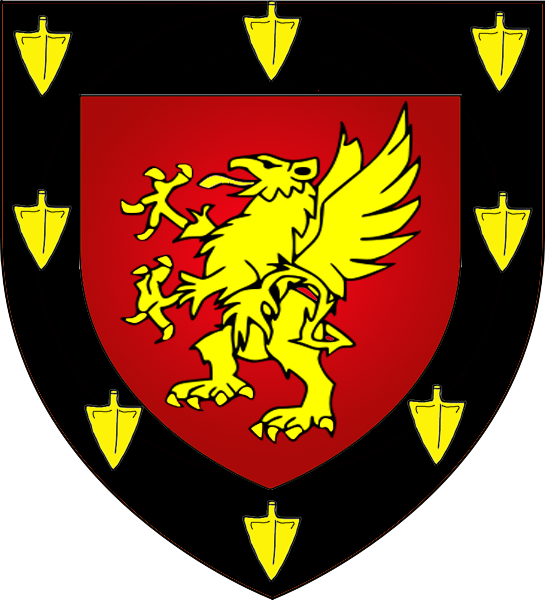
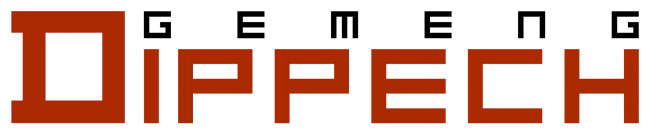
- Coat of arms Brandmark

- Map of Luxembourg with Dippach highlighted in orange, and the canton in dark red
- Coordinates: 49.5875°N 5.9833°E
- Country: Luxembourg
- Canton: Capellen

Government
  - Mayor: Manon Bei-Roller (LSAP)

Area
  - Total: 17.42 km^{2} (6.73 sq mi)
  - Rank: 66th of 100
- Highest elevation: 352 m (1,155 ft)
  - Rank: 84th of 100
- Lowest elevation: 277 m (909 ft)
  - Rank: 79th of 100

Population (2026)
  - Total: 4,789
  - Rank: 40th of 100
  - Density: 274.9/km^{2} (712.0/sq mi)
  - Rank: 33rd of 100
- Time zone: UTC+1 (CET)
  - Summer (DST): UTC+2 (CEST)
- LAU 2: LU0000101
- Website: dippach.lu

Dippach (German pronunciation: [ˈdɪpax]; Luxembourgish: Dippech [ˈdipəɕ]) is a commune and small town in south-western Luxembourg. It is part of the canton of Capellen, which is part of the district of Luxembourg. The commune's administrative centre is Schouweiler. The River Mess, a tributary of the Alzette, rises here.

As of September 2026, the town of Dippach, which lies in the north-east of the commune, has a population of 1,065. Other villages within the commune include Bettange-sur-Mess, Schouweiler, and Sprinkange.

== Population ==
Historical population

Year	Pop.	±%
1821	880	—
1851	1,343	+52.6%
1900	1,150	−14.4%
1910	1,240	+7.8%
1922	1,124	−9.4%
1935	1,366	+21.5%

Year	Pop.	±%
1947	1,224	−10.4%
1960	1,329	+8.6%
1970	1,620	+21.9%
1981	2,008	+24.0%
1990	2,520	+25.5%
2000	3,136	+24.4%

Year	Pop.	±%
2005	3,417	+9.0%
2010	3,537	+3.5%
2015	4,037	+14.1%
2020	4,449	+10.2%
2021	4,461	+0.3%

Source data

== Notable people ==
- Johann Peter Kirsch (1861–1941), ecclesiastical historian and biblical archaeologist
- Laurent Didier (born 1984), former road bicycle racer
- Tom Wirtgen (born 1996), cyclist

== Twin towns ==
Dippach is twinned with:

- Landiras, France

== Aerial views ==
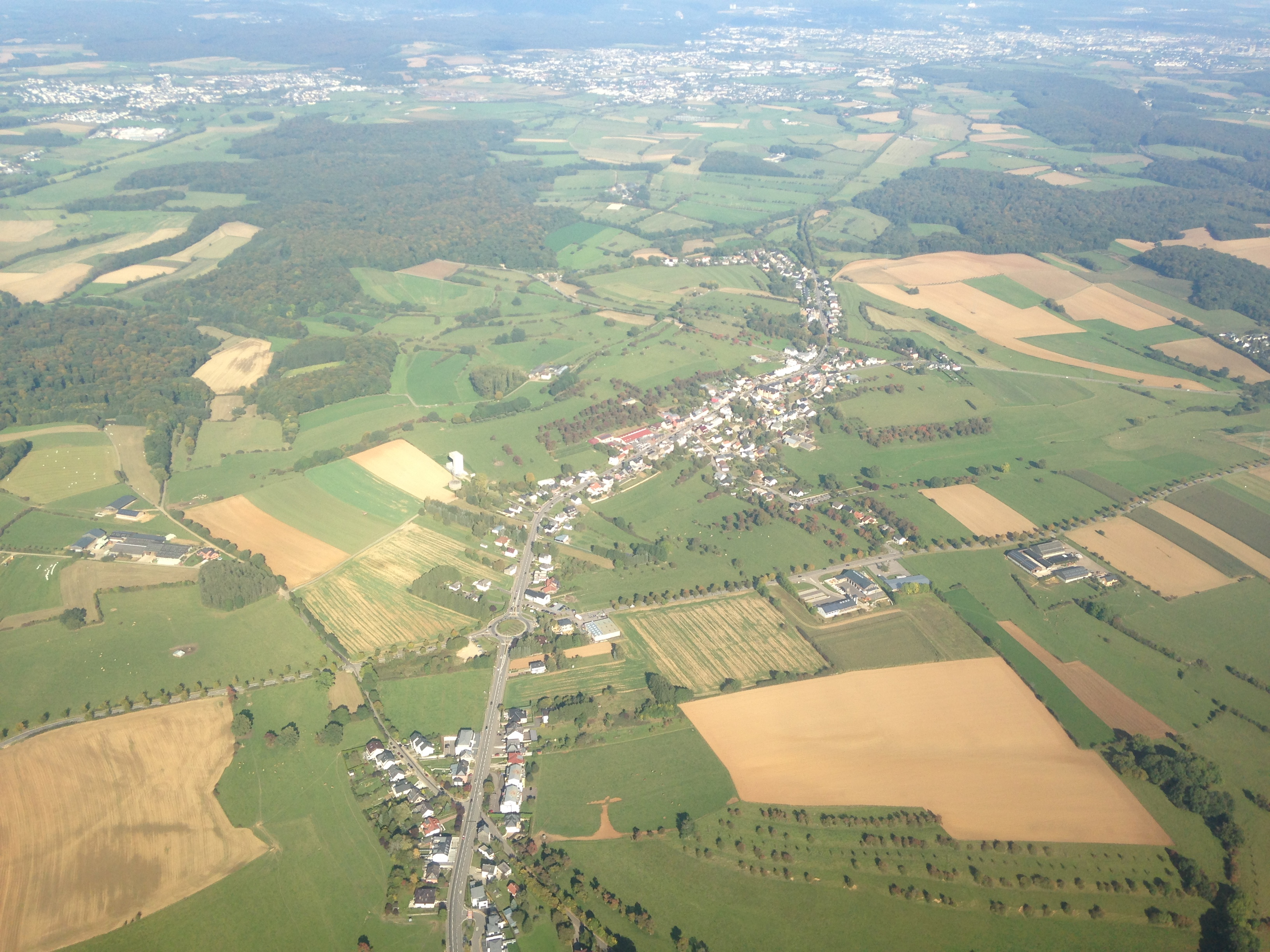
Aerial view of the localities of Dippach (Dippech)...

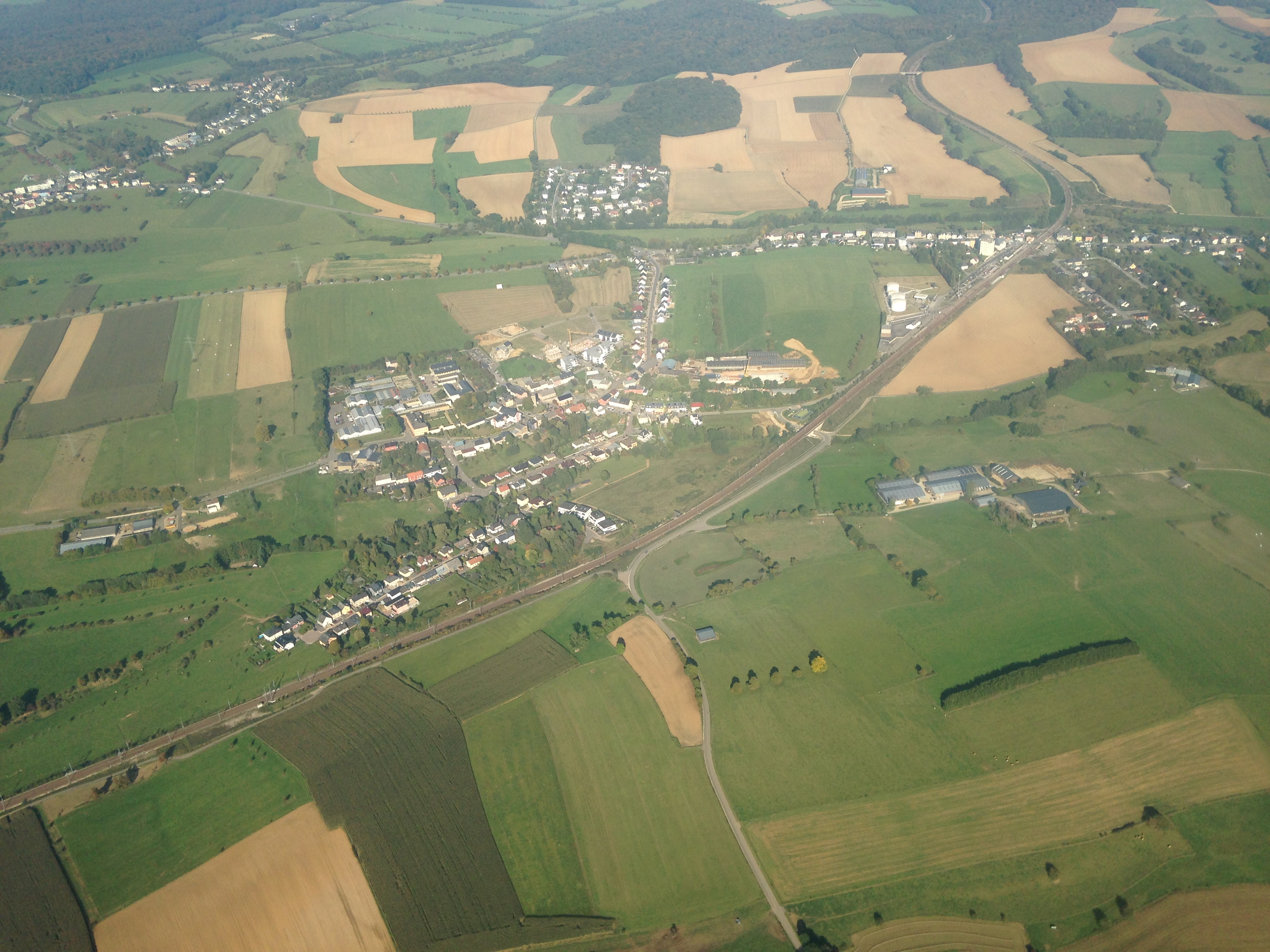
... and of Bettange-sur-Mess (Betten op der Mess) and Dippach-Gare (Dippech-Gare).
