= Schwiedelbrouch =

Village in Luxembourg

Coordinates: 49°50′N 5°51′E

Schwiedelbrouch (Luxembourgish: Schwiddelbrouch) is a village in the commune of Rambrouch, in the Diekirch District, and the canton of Redange, in western Luxembourg. (Historically it was in the commune of Folschette.) As of 2001, the village has a population of 80.
