= Flatzbour =

Village in Luxembourg

Coordinates: 49°50′08″N 5°47′15″E

Flatzbour Flatzbuer / Flatzbur
- Village
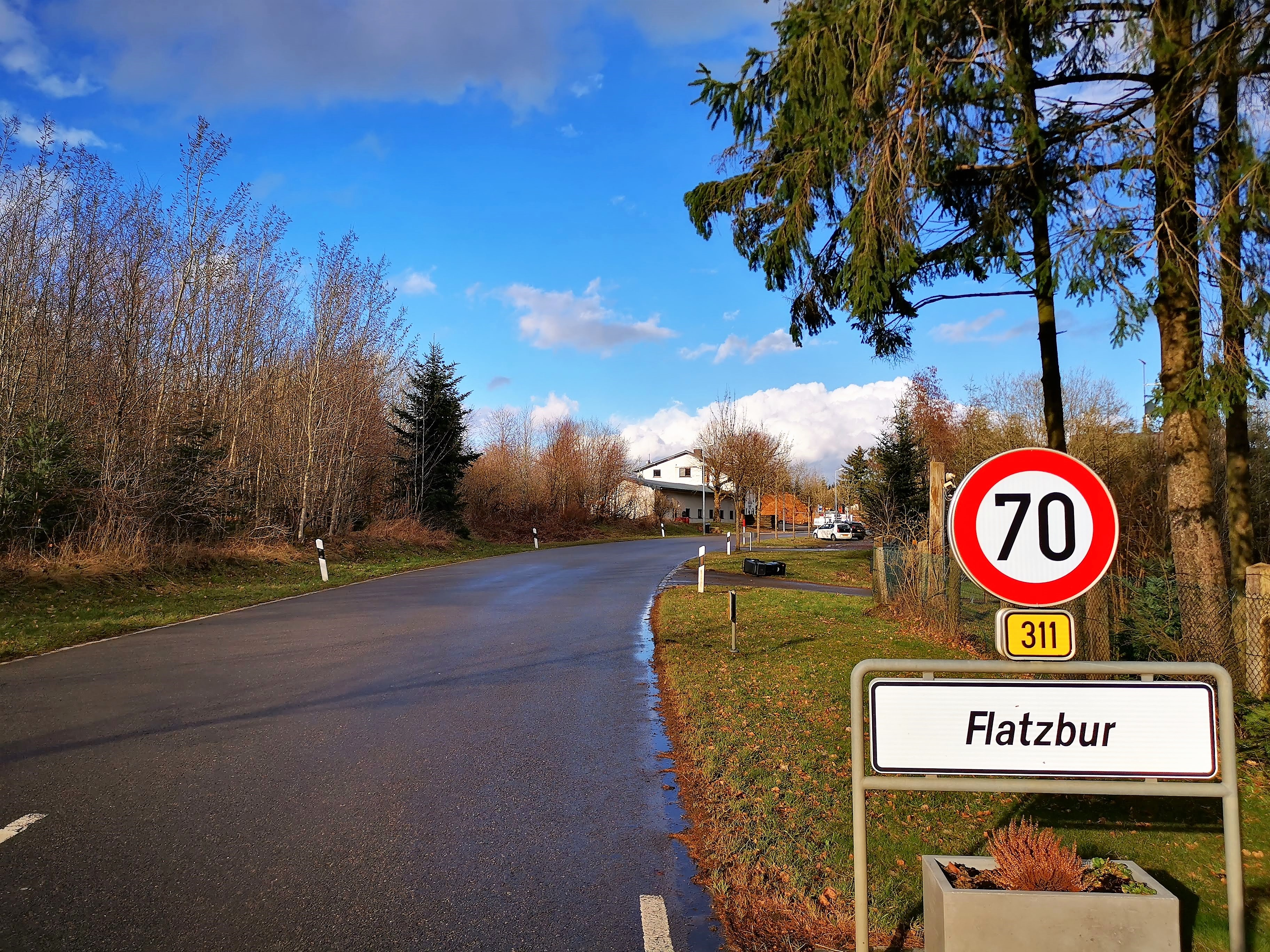
- Interactive map of Flatzbour
- Country: Luxembourg
- Canton: Redange
- Commune: Rambrouch

Population
  - Total: 30
- Time zone: UTC+1 (CET)
  - Summer (DST): UTC+2 (CEST)

Flatzbour (Luxembourgish: Flatzbuer or Flatzbur) is a village in northwestern Luxembourg.

It is situated in the commune of Rambrouch and has a population of 28 as of 2026.
