= Perlé =

Coordinates: 49°49′N 5°46′E

Perlé Pärel
- Former commune of Luxembourg
- Interactive map of Perlé
- Country: Luxembourg
- District: Diekirch
- Canton: Redange
- Created: Original commune
- Abolished: 1 January 1979
- Currently: Part of Rambrouch

Perlé (French pronunciation: [pɛʁle]; Luxembourgish: Pärel [ˈpɛːʀəl]; German: Perl [pɛʁl]) is a small town in the commune of Rambrouch, in western Luxembourg. As of September 2026, the town has a population of 979.

Perlé was a commune in the canton of Redange until 1 January 1979, when it was merged with the communes of Arsdorf, Bigonville, and Folschette to form the new commune of Rambrouch. The law creating Rambrouch was passed on 27 July 1978.
