= Administrative divisions of Luxembourg =

The Grand Duchy of Luxembourg is divided into cantons, which group the communes (= municipalities). A dozen of the communes have official city status, and one, Luxembourg City, is unofficially further divided into quarters.

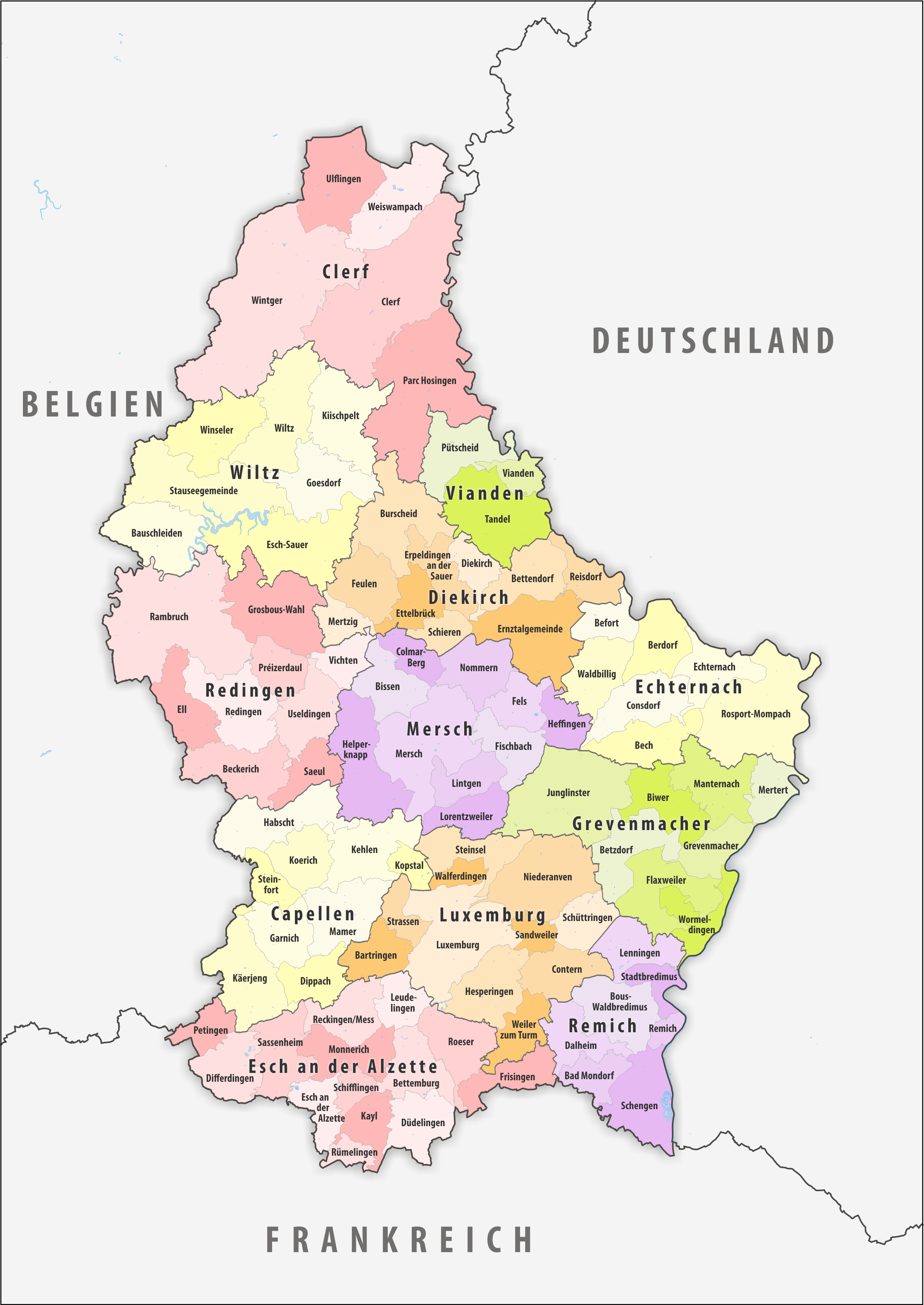
The administrative divisions, coloured and coded according to canton and commune.

== Districts ==
Luxembourg was divided into three districts until their abolition in October 2015:

- Diekirch
- Grevenmacher
- Luxembourg

== Cantons ==
There are a total of 12 cantons, which were previously a subdivision of the districts but are now the first-level subdivision of Luxembourg:

- Capellen
- Clervaux
- Diekirch
- Echternach
- Esch-sur-Alzette
- Grevenmacher
- Luxembourg
- Mersch
- Redange
- Remich
- Vianden
- Wiltz

== Communes ==
The communes (municipalities) are the lowest administrative division in Luxembourg. They were first created during the French Revolution. As of 2020, there were 102 communes.

=== Cities ===
12 communes have legal city status. Luxembourg City, the nation's capital, is the largest city in the country.

== Quarters of Luxembourg City ==
Below the official administrative level of the commune, Luxembourg City has further unofficial administrative subdivisions, known as quarters. The twenty-four quarters of Luxembourg City are a de facto subdivision without legal basis used to simplify public administration.

== Constituencies ==
There are four electoral constituencies of Luxembourg: Centre, East, North, and South.
