= Wolwelange =

Town in western Luxembourg

Coordinates: 49°50′N 5°46′E

Wolwelange Wolwen (Luxembourgish), Wolwelingen (German)
- Town
- Interactive map of Wolwelange
- Country: Luxembourg
- Commune: Rambrouch

Population (2024)
  - Total: 521

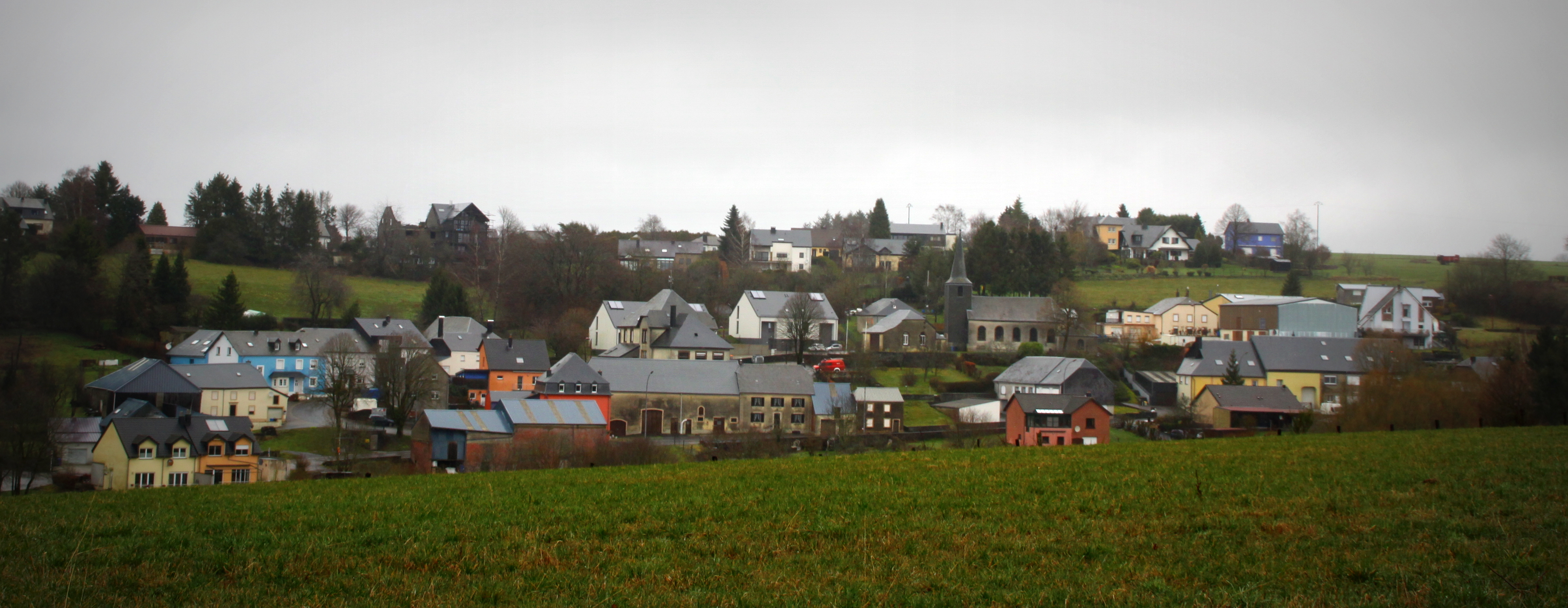
View of Wolwelange from the shed

Wolwelange (Luxembourgish: Wolwen, German: Wolwelingen) is a small town in the commune of Rambrouch, in western Luxembourg. As of September 2026, the town has a population of 541.
