= Nico Klein =

Luxembourgish sports shooter (born 1930)

Personal information
- Born: 4 January 1930 Bilsdorf, Luxembourg

Sport
- Sport: Sports shooting

Nico Klein (born 4 January 1930) is a Luxembourgish former sports shooter. He competed in the 50 metre pistol event at the 1968 Summer Olympics.
