= Folschette =

Coordinates: 49°49′N 5°52′E

Folschette Foulscht
- Former commune of Luxembourg
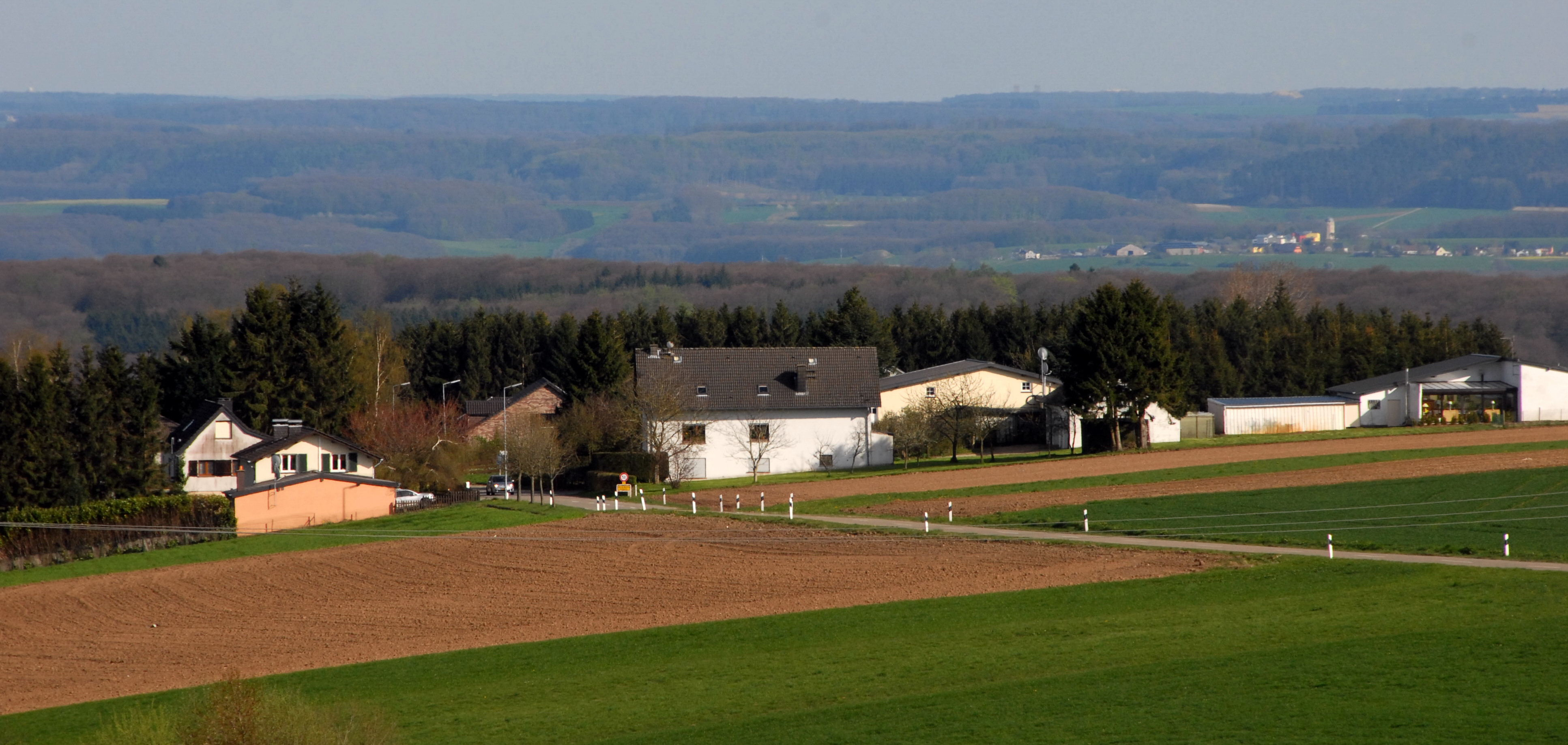
- View of Foulscht from Rammerech in 2008.
- Interactive map of Folschette
- Country: Luxembourg
- District: Diekirch
- Canton: Redange
- Created: Original commune
- Abolished: 1 January 1979
- Currently: Part of Rambrouch

Folschette (French pronunciation: [fɔlʃɛt]; Luxembourgish: Foulscht [fəʊ̯lʃt]; German: Folscheid [ˈfɔlʃaɪt]) is a small town in the commune of Rambrouch, in western Luxembourg. As of September 2026, the town has a population of 536.

Folschette was a commune in the canton of Redange until 1 January 1979, when it was merged with the communes of Arsdorf, Bigonville, and Perlé to form the new commune of Rambrouch. The law creating Rambrouch was passed on 27 July 1978.
