= CR118 road (Luxembourg) =

Road in Luxembourg

CR118
- Chemin repris 118

Major junctions
- West end: N 7 at Berschbach near Mersch
- N 14 at Larochette
- East end: E29 at Lauterborn

Location
- Country: Luxembourg

Highway system
- Motorways in Luxembourg

CR118, also known in some portions of the road as Route d'Echternach or Rue Scheerbach, is a road in central Luxembourg.

== History ==
On April 1, 2012, a driver veered off the side of the road near Angelsberg, hitting a tree. On May 6, 2016, an accident happened in a similar manner on the same road, prompting the Ministry of Infrastructure to announce new security measures for the road, including new guardrails and more visible warning signs. François Bausch, the Minister of Infrastructure stated that "these measures will be completed as soon as possible".
