= Rambrouch =

Rambrouch Rammerech, Rammerich
- Commune
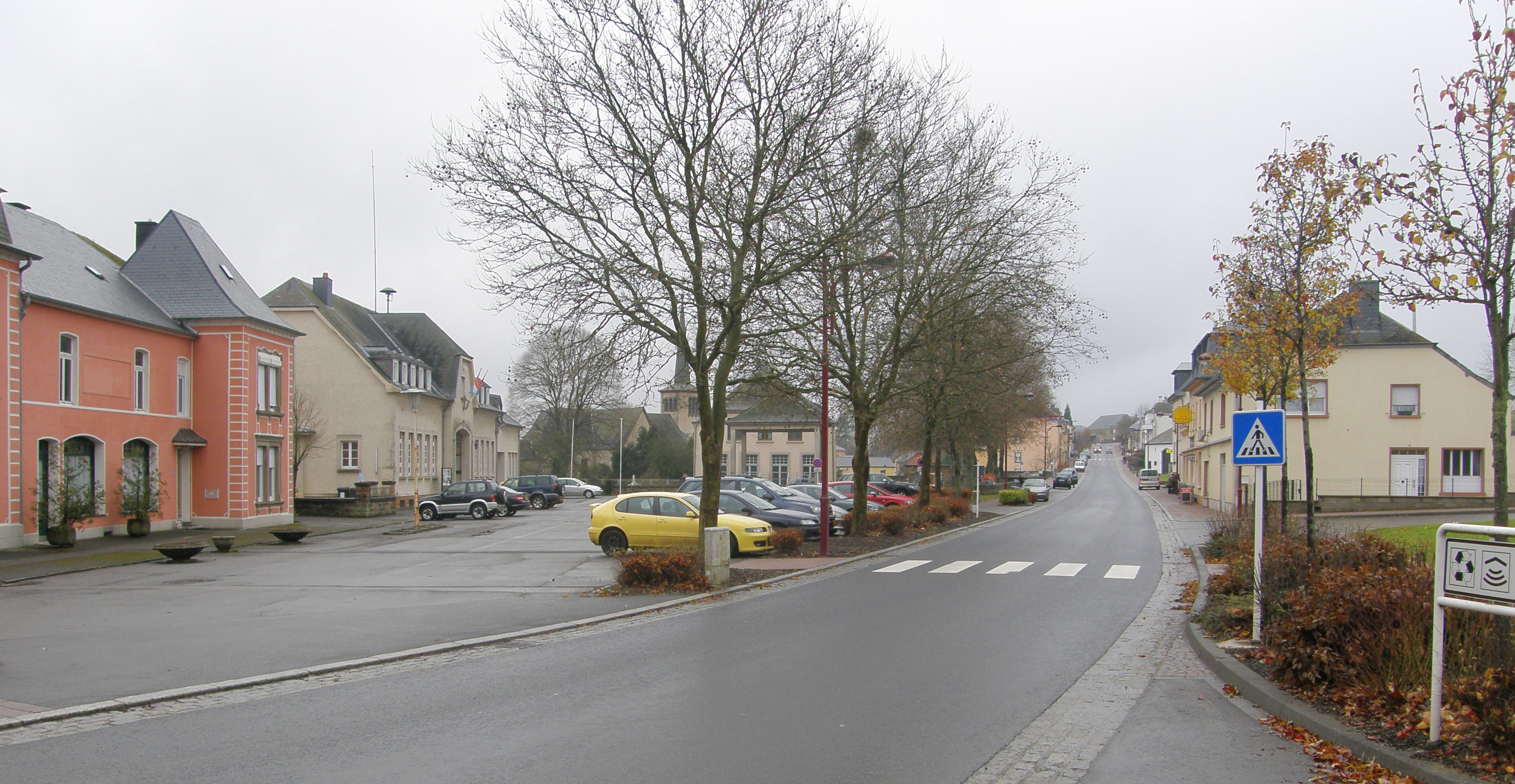

- Coat of arms

- Map of Luxembourg with Rambrouch highlighted in orange, and the canton in dark red
- Coordinates: 49.829875°N 5.849781°E
- Country: Luxembourg
- Canton: Redange

Government
  - Mayor: Myriam Binck

Area
  - Total: 79.09 km^{2} (30.54 sq mi)
  - Rank: 3rd of 100
- Highest elevation: 554 m (1,818 ft)
  - Rank: 2nd of 100
- Lowest elevation: 311 m (1,020 ft)
  - Rank: 97th of 100

Population (2026)
  - Total: 5,128
  - Rank: 37th of 100
  - Density: 64.84/km^{2} (167.9/sq mi)
  - Rank: 88th of 100
- Time zone: UTC+1 (CET)
  - Summer (DST): UTC+2 (CEST)
- LAU 2: LU0000704
- Website: rambrouch.lu

Rambrouch (Luxembourgish: Rammerech or (locally) Rammerich; German: Rambruch [ˈʁambʁʊx]) is a commune and small town in western Luxembourg, in the canton of Redange. It lies close to the border with Belgium.

Rambrouch was formed on 1 January 1979 from the former communes of Arsdorf, Bigonville, Folschette, and Perlé, all in Redange canton. The law creating Rambrouch was passed on 27 July 1978.

As of September 2026, the town of Rambrouch, which lies in the centre of the commune, has a population of 597.

== Populated places ==
The commune consists of the following villages:

Arsdorf Section:

- Arsdorf
- Bilsdorf

Bigonville Section:

- Bigonville
- Flatzbour
- Bungeref-Poteau
- Martelinville (lieu-dit)

Folschette Section:

- Eschette
- Folschette
- Hostert
- Rambrouch
- Koetschette
- Schwiedelbrouch
- Napoléonsgaard (lieu-dit)

Perlé Section:

- Holtz
- Perlé
- Rombach-Martelange
- Haut-Martelange
- Wolwelange

== Population ==
Historical population

Year	Pop.	±%
1821	2,724	—
1851	4,498	+65.1%
1900	4,150	−7.7%
1910	4,175	+0.6%
1922	3,642	−12.8%
1935	3,362	−7.7%

Year	Pop.	±%
1947	3,203	−4.7%
1960	2,705	−15.5%
1970	2,612	−3.4%
1981	2,540	−2.8%
1990	2,737	+7.8%
2000	3,190	+16.6%

Year	Pop.	±%
2005	3,579	+12.2%
2010	3,854	+7.7%
2015	4,169	+8.2%
2020	4,480	+7.5%
2021	4,589	+2.4%

Source data

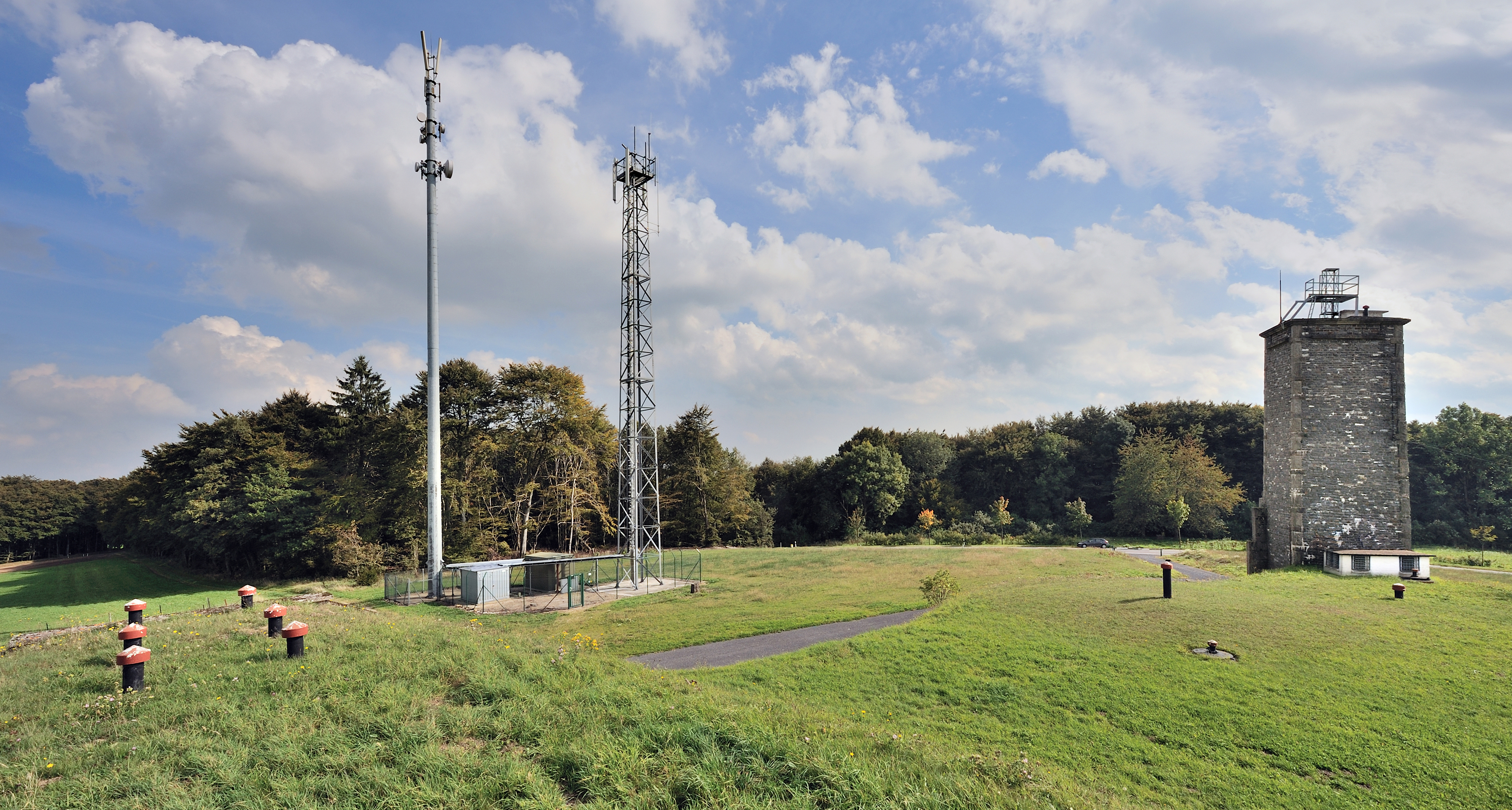
Napoleon's Garden

== See also ==
- Napoléonsgaard Hill
