= Hostert, Rambrouch =

Town in the commune of Rambrouch in Luxembourg

Coordinates: 49.80874°N 5.86591°E

Hostert (Luxembourgish: Hueschtert) is a small town in the commune of Rambrouch, in western Luxembourg. As of September 2026, the town has a population of 452.
