= Fischbach, Mersch =

Fischbach Fëschbech
- Commune
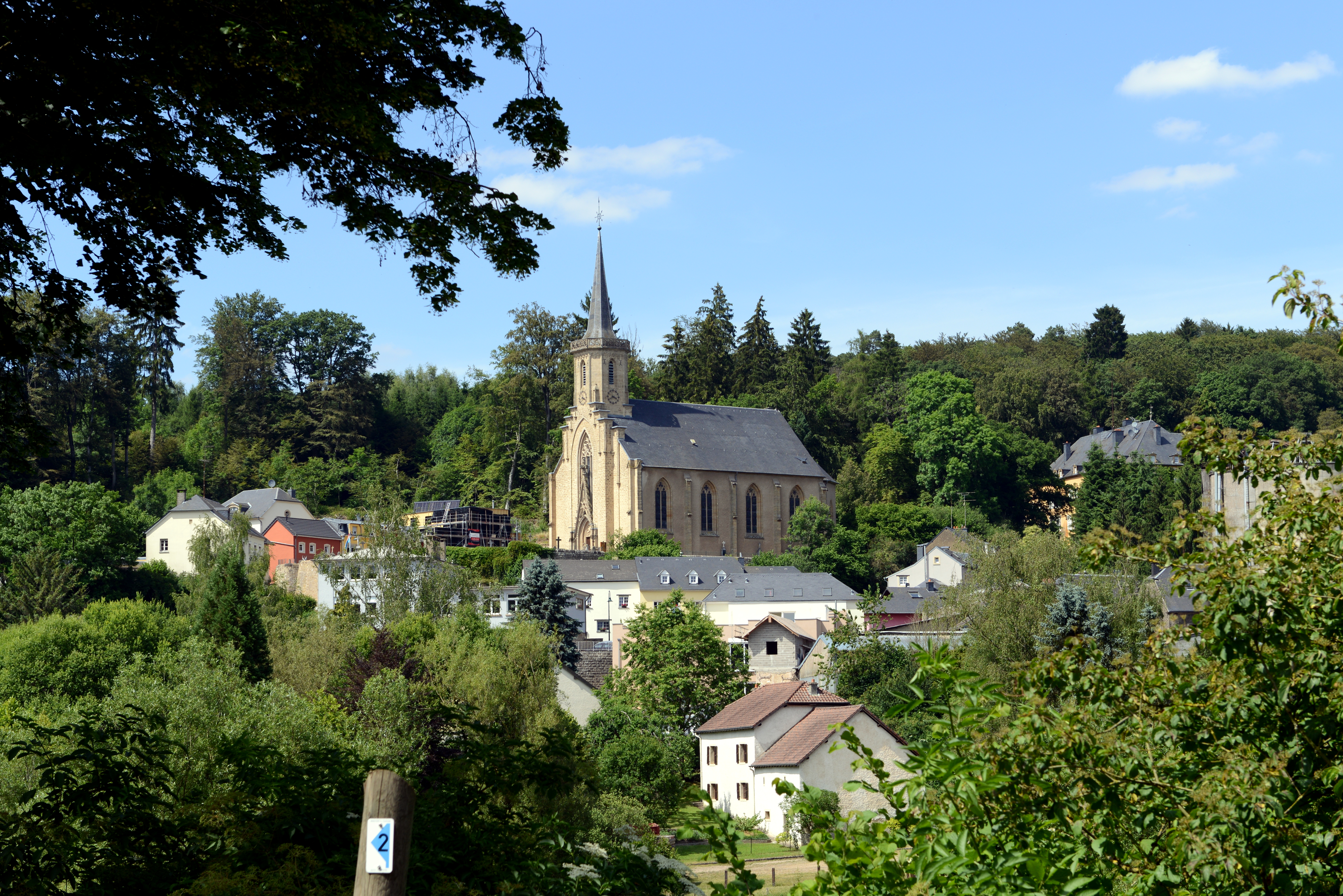

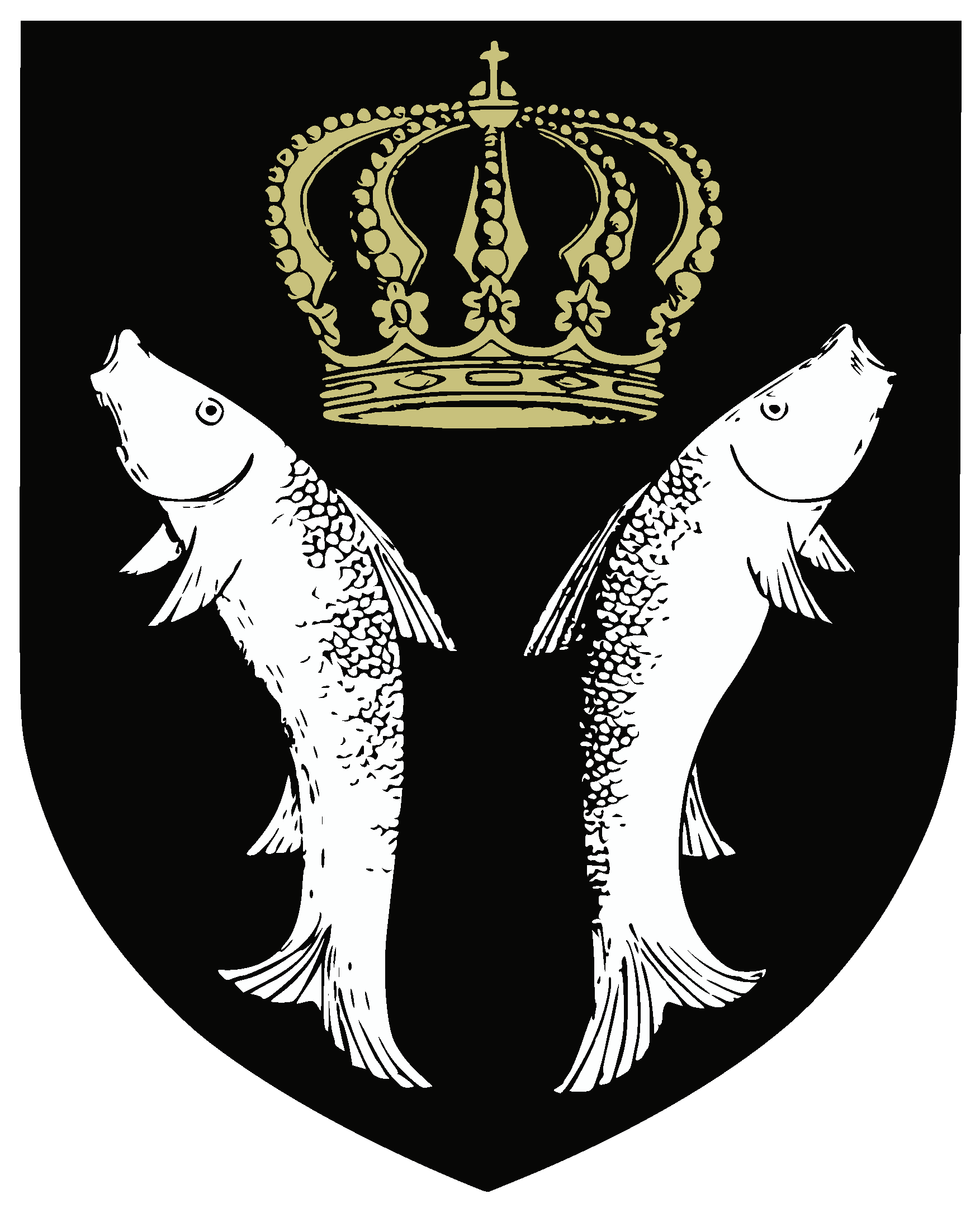
- Coat of arms

- Map of Luxembourg with Fischbach highlighted in orange, and the canton in dark red
- Coordinates: 49.7333°N 6.1833°E
- Country: Luxembourg
- Canton: Mersch

Government
  - Mayor: Lucien Brosius

Area
  - Total: 19.61 km^{2} (7.57 sq mi)
  - Rank: 60th of 100
- Highest elevation: 427 m (1,401 ft)
  - Rank: 30th of 100
- Lowest elevation: 288 m (945 ft)
  - Rank: 89th of 100

Population (2026)
  - Total: 1,358
  - Rank: 97th of 100
  - Density: 69.25/km^{2} (179.4/sq mi)
  - Rank: 84th of 100
- Time zone: UTC+1 (CET)
  - Summer (DST): UTC+2 (CEST)
- LAU 2: LU0000404
- Website: acfischbach.lu

Fischbach (German pronunciation: [ˈfɪʃˌbax]; Luxembourgish: Fëschbech [ˈfəʃbəɕ]) is a commune and village in central Luxembourg. It is part of the canton of Mersch, which is part of the district of Luxembourg.

As of September 2026, the town of Fischbach, which lies in the centre of the commune, had a population of 443. Other towns within the commune include Angelsberg and Schoos. Fischbach is the site of Fischbach Castle, one of the private residences of the Grand Ducal family.

A proposal to merge the commune with Nommern and Larochette into a new commune named Meesebuerg was put to a referendum in November 2014. Although 66.5% of voters in Larochette were in favour of the merger, 76% and 70% of those in Fischbach and Nommern respectively were against, leading to the abandonment of the project.

== Population ==
Historical population

Year	Pop.	±%
1821	708	—
1851	1,096	+54.8%
1900	621	−43.3%
1910	592	−4.7%
1922	545	−7.9%
1935	518	−5.0%

Year	Pop.	±%
1947	467	−9.8%
1960	388	−16.9%
1970	426	+9.8%
1981	465	+9.2%
1990	488	+4.9%
2000	609	+24.8%

Year	Pop.	±%
2005	678	+11.3%
2010	820	+20.9%
2015	1,139	+38.9%
2020	1,215	+6.7%
2021	1,238	+1.9%

Source data

== See also ==
- List of villages in Luxembourg
