= Holtz, Luxembourg =

Town in the commune of Rambrouch in Luxembourg

Coordinates: 49°48′N 5°47′E

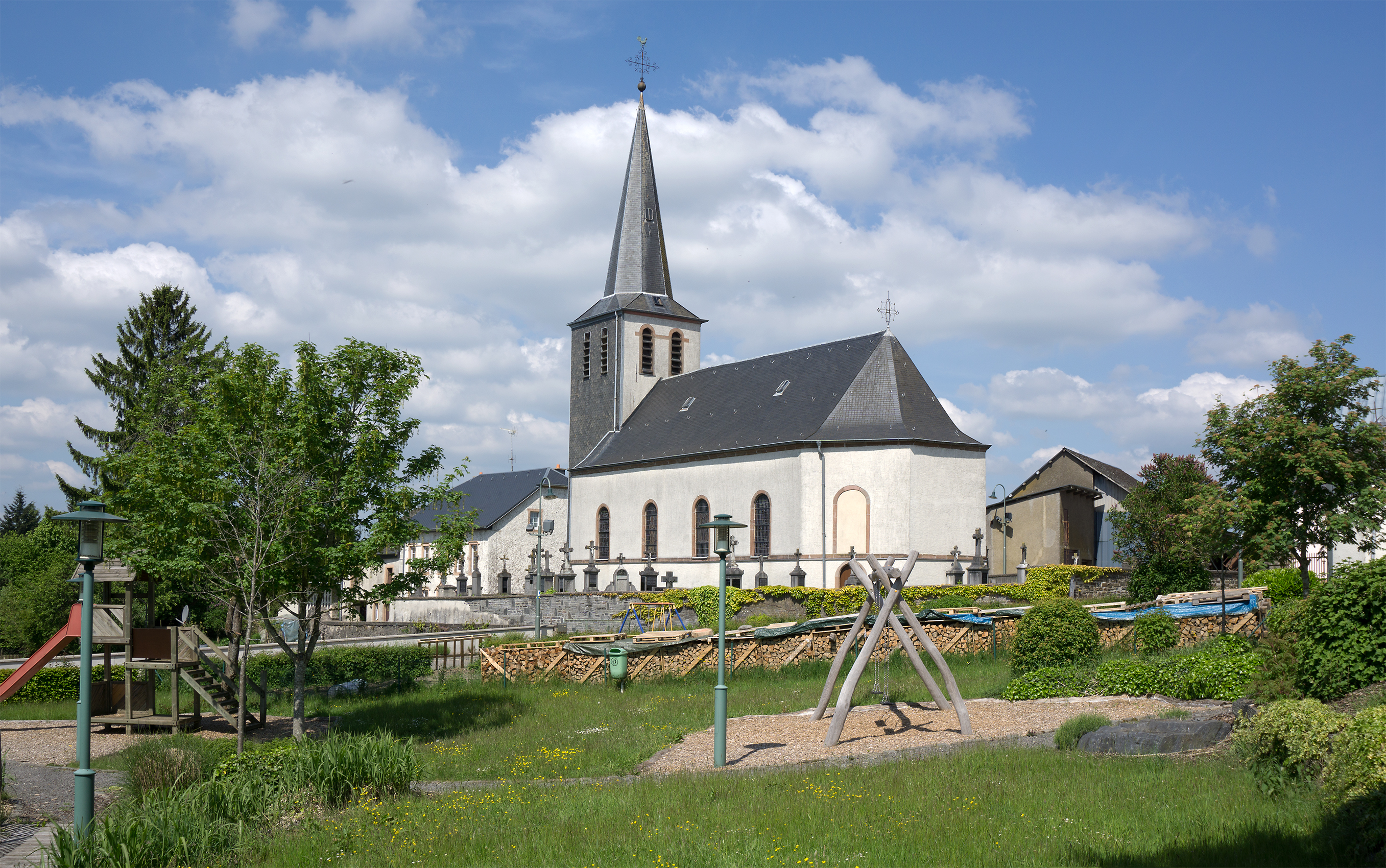
Church of Holtz, Luxembourg

Holtz (German pronunciation: [hɔlts]; Luxembourgish: Holz) is a small town in the commune of Rambrouch, in western Luxembourg. As of September 2026, the town had a population of 309.
