= Levelange =

Village in Luxembourg

Coordinates: 49°44′21″N 5°51′20″E

Levelange Liewel / Leewel
- Hamlet
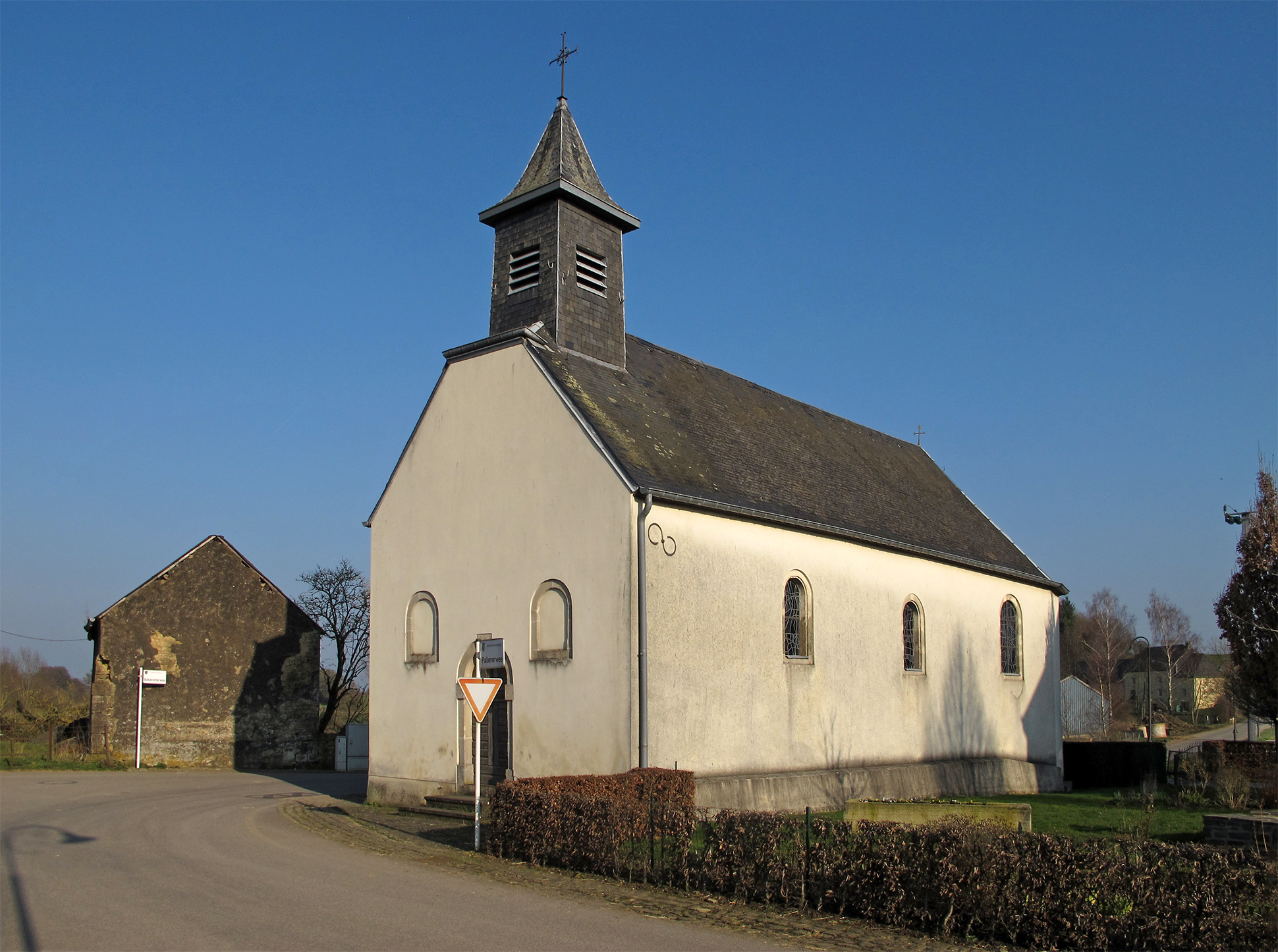
- Chapel in Levelange
- Interactive map of Levelange
- Country: Luxembourg
- Canton: Redange
- Commune: Beckerich

Population
  - Total: 108
- Time zone: UTC+1 (CET)
  - Summer (DST): UTC+2 (CEST)

Levelange (Luxembourgish: Liewel or Leewel) is a hamlet in northwestern Luxembourg.

It is situated in the commune of Beckerich, and as of 2026, has a population of 112.
