= Sprinkange =

Town in Luxembourg

Coordinates: 49.5796°N 5.9656°E

Sprinkange (Luxembourgish: Sprénkeng, German: Sprinkingen) is a small town in the commune of Dippach, in south-western Luxembourg. As of September 2026, the town has a population of 597.
