= Bilsdorf =

Village in Luxembourg

Coordinates: 49°51′N 5°49′E

Bilsdorf (German pronunciation: [ˈbɪlsˌdɔʁf]; Luxembourgish: Bilschdref) is a village in the commune of Rambrouch, in western Luxembourg. As of September 2026, the village had a population of 180. Olympian Nico Klein was born here.
