= Hovelange =

Town in Beckerich, Luxembourg

Coordinates: 49°43′N 5°54′E

Hovelange (French pronunciation: [ɔvlɑ̃ʒ]; Luxembourgish: Huewel, German: Hovelingen) is a small town in the commune of Beckerich, in western Luxembourg. As of September 2026, the town has a population of 425.
