= Johann Peter Kirsch =

Luxembourgish Catholic priest, archaeologist and anthropologist

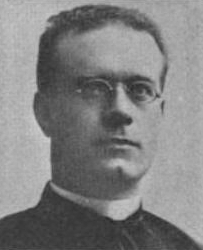
- Born: 3 November 1861; Dippach, Luxembourg
- Died: 4 February 1941 (aged 79); Rome, Italy
- Occupations: Ecclesiastical historian and biblical archaeologist

Johann Peter Kirsch (3 November 1861 – 4 February 1941) was a Luxembourgish ecclesiastical historian and biblical archaeologist.

== Life ==
Johann Peter Kirsch was born in Dippach, Luxembourg, the son of Andreas and Katherine Didier Kirsch. At the age of ten, he went to live with his maternal uncle, Johann Jakob Didier, a priest at Fels. He began his high school education at the Atheneum, and then went to the seminary. He was ordained a priest on 23 August 1884. That autumn he was sent to Rome to attend the Collegio Teutonico. From 1884 to 1890, he studied archeology, paleography and diplomacy at the Collegio Apollinare and at other papal universities in Rome. Kirsch was a student of renowned archaeologist Giovanni Battista de Rossi. In 1887, he was a co-founder of the "Roman Quarterly".

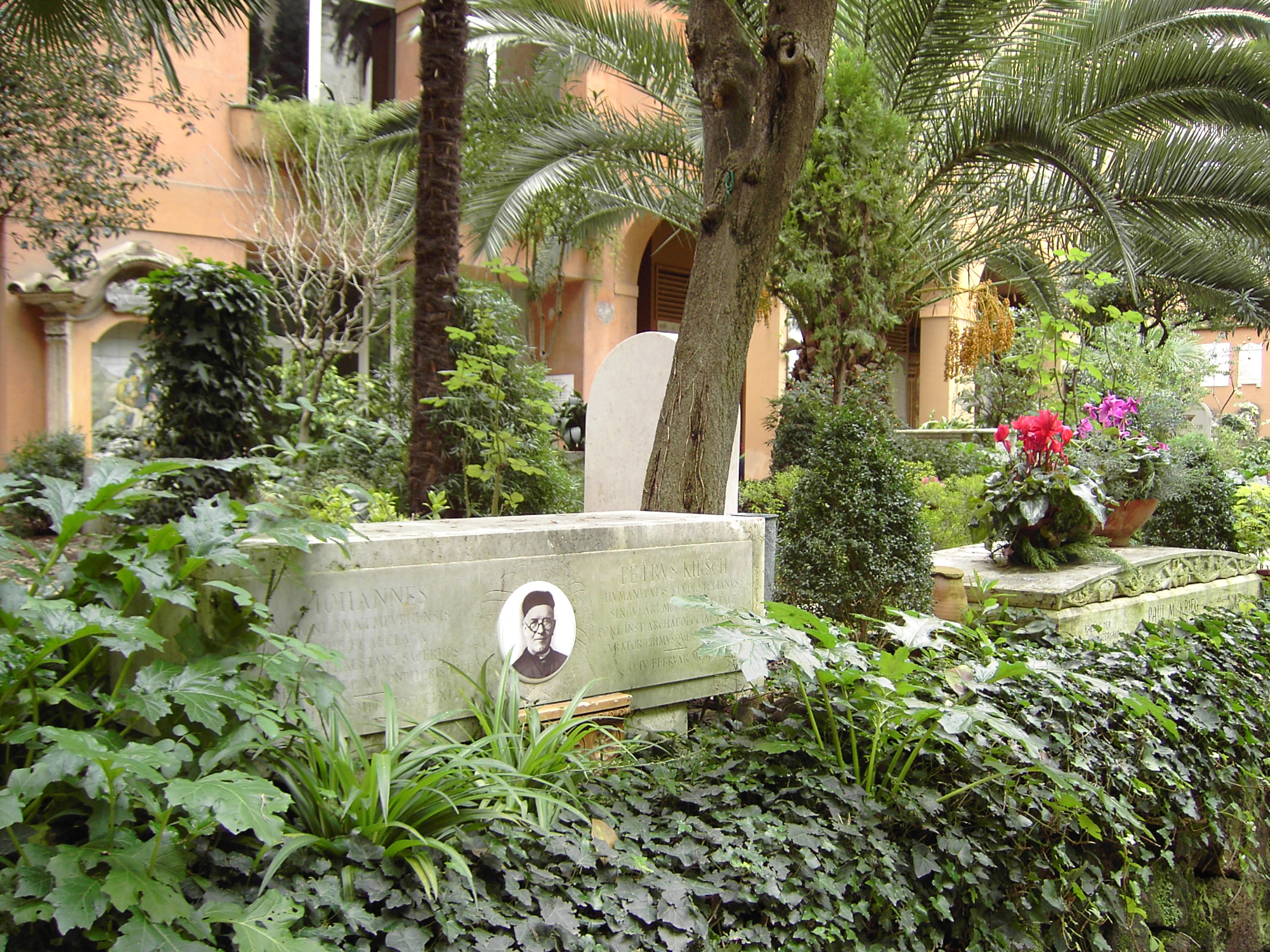
Tomb of Johann Peter Kirsch, Campo Santo Teutonico, Rome

In the spring of 1888, he and Francesco Saverio Cavallari studied inscriptions and catacombs in Syracuse; in Naples he examined lead bulls. That December, Kirsch became the first Director of the Historical Institute of the Görres Society in Rome.

From 1889 to 1932, he was professor of patristics and biblical archaeology at the University of Fribourg, where Clemens August Graf von Galen was one of his students. Kirsch held archaeological lectures and seminars in German and French. In 1907, he founded the "Swiss Journal of Church History". Kirsch spent several weeks in Rome every year and did extensive studies on the early churches of Rome. He also carried out fundamental research on curial financial management in the 13th and 14th centuries. In 1925, Pope Pius XI asked Kirsch to direct the Pontificio Istituto di Archeologia Cristiana in Rome. In 1932, Kirsch was made a prothonotary apostolic.

Monsignor Kirsch contributed many articles to the Catholic Encyclopedia. He died in Rome on 4 February 1941, and is buried at the Campo Santo Teutonico.

== Works ==
- Die christlichen Cultusgebäude im Alterthum (Christian Religious Buildings in Antiquity), Verlag und Druck, 1893.
- "Financial management of the College of Cardinals in the 13th and 14th centuries", In Church Historical Studies, vol. 2, No. 4. Münster: Schöningh, 1895.
- Die Acclamationen und Gebete der altchristlichen Grabschriften (The Acclamations and Prayers of the Early Christian Epitaphs), J.P. Bachem, 1897.
- Die Rücker der Päpste Urban V. Und Gregor XI (The Return of Popes Urban V and Gregory XI), F. Schöningh, 1898.
- Forschungen zur christlichen Literaturund Dogmengeschichte, (Research on the History of Christian Literature and Dogma), F. Schöningh,1900.
- The doctrine of the communion of Saints in the ancient Church : a study in the history of dogma, 1910
- Die Romischen Titelkirchen im Altertum (The Roman Titular Churches in Antiquity), Druck und Verlag, 1918.
- "The city of Roman in the ancient Christian feast calendar. Critical textual studies on the Roman Depositiones and the Martyrologium Hieronymianum". In Historical liturgy sources. Münster: Aschendorff, 1924.
- Handbuch der Allgemeinen Kirchengenschichte (Handbook of General Church History), Herder & Co., 1925.
- Die Stationskirchen des Missale Romanum (The Station Churches of the Roman Missal), Herder & Co., 1926.
- The Roman Catacombs, 1933
