= Beckerich =

Beckerich Biekerech
- Commune
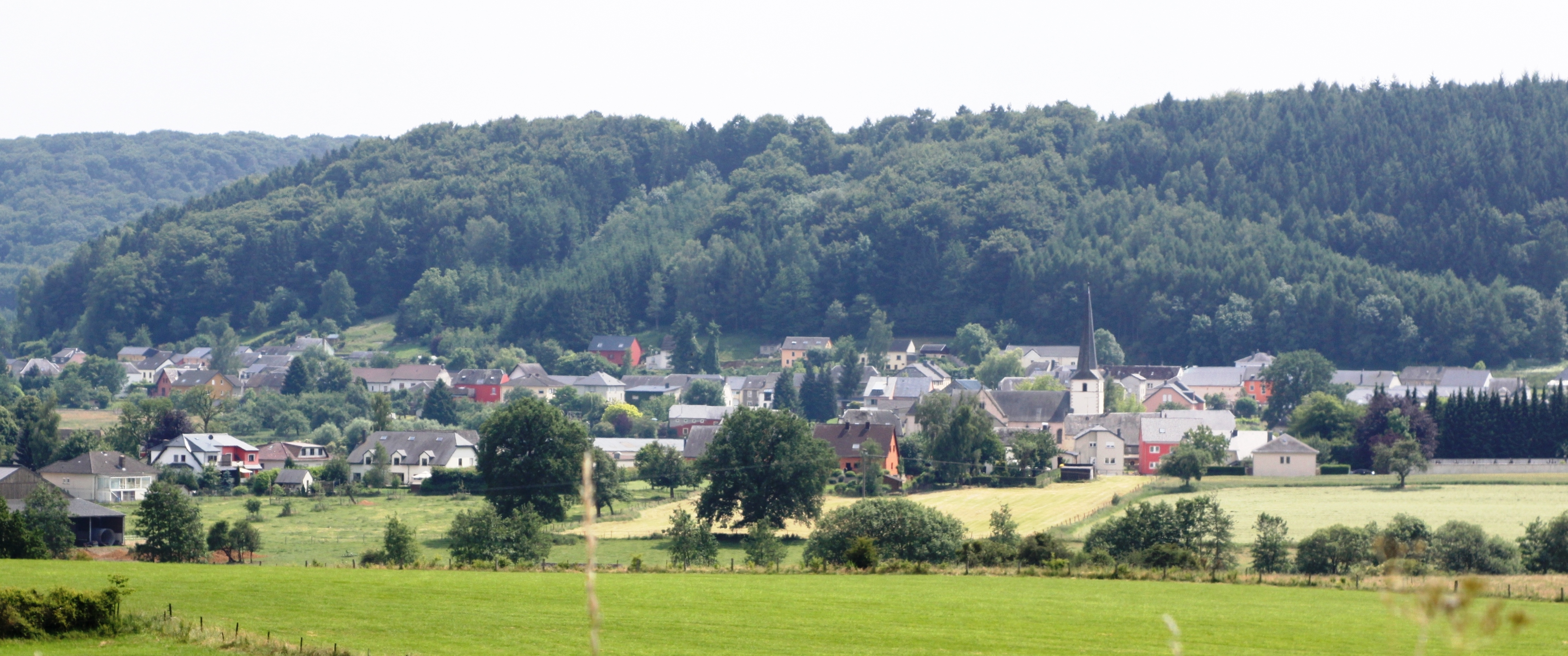

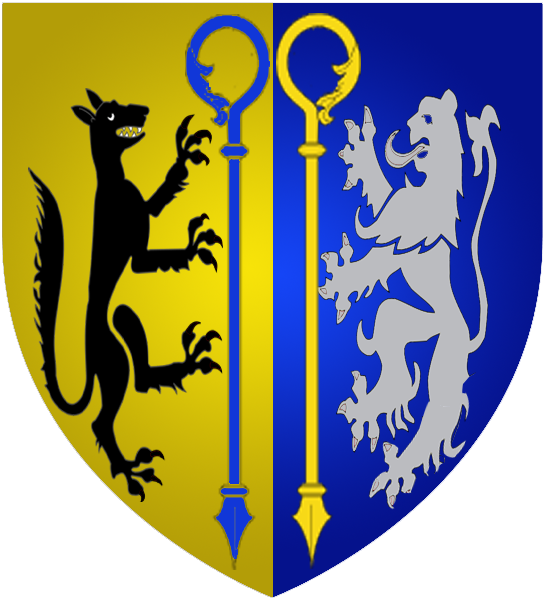
- Coat of arms

- Map of Luxembourg with Beckerich highlighted in orange, and the canton in dark red
- Coordinates: 49.7306°N 5.8833°E
- Country: Luxembourg
- Canton: Redange

Government
  - Mayor: Thierry Lagoda (Independent)

Area
  - Total: 28.41 km^{2} (10.97 sq mi)
  - Rank: 28th of 100
- Highest elevation: 400 m (1,300 ft)
  - Rank: 50th of 100
- Lowest elevation: 265 m (869 ft)
  - Rank: 68th of 100

Population (2025)
  - Total: 2,879
  - Rank: 58th of 100
  - Density: 101.3/km^{2} (262.5/sq mi)
  - Rank: 69th of 100
- Time zone: UTC+1 (CET)
  - Summer (DST): UTC+2 (CEST)
- LAU 2: LU0000701
- Website: beckerich.lu

Beckerich (German pronunciation: [ˈbɛkəʁɪç]; Luxembourgish: Biekerech) is a commune and small town in western Luxembourg, in the canton of Redange. It lies close to the border with Belgium.

As of September 2026, the town of Beckerich, which lies in the centre of the commune, has a population of 895.

Beckerich has a drinking water production plant, which supplies Lidl Stores with water internationally. It supplies about 85% of its energy needs, exclusive of transportation, from alternative energy sources, primarily manure.

== Populated places ==
The commune consists of the following villages:

Beckerich Section:

- Beckerich
- Elvange
- Hovelange
- Huttange
- Noerdange
- Schweich
- Hovelangerhof (lieu-dit)
- Liederreng (lieu-dit)
- Liederrengerhof (lieu-dit)

Oberpallen Section:

- Dideling
- Levelange
- Oberpallen

== Population ==
Historical population

Year	Pop.	±%
1821	1,532	—
1851	1,996	+30.3%
1900	2,039	+2.2%
1910	1,908	−6.4%
1922	1,856	−2.7%
1935	1,815	−2.2%

Year	Pop.	±%
1947	1,729	−4.7%
1960	1,638	−5.3%
1970	1,570	−4.2%
1981	1,492	−5.0%
1990	1,618	+8.4%
2000	2,001	+23.7%

Year	Pop.	±%
2005	2,140	+6.9%
2010	2,284	+6.7%
2015	2,408	+5.4%
2020	2,708	+12.5%
2021	2,784	+2.8%

Source data
