= Schweich, Luxembourg =

Coordinates: 49°43′N 5°56′E

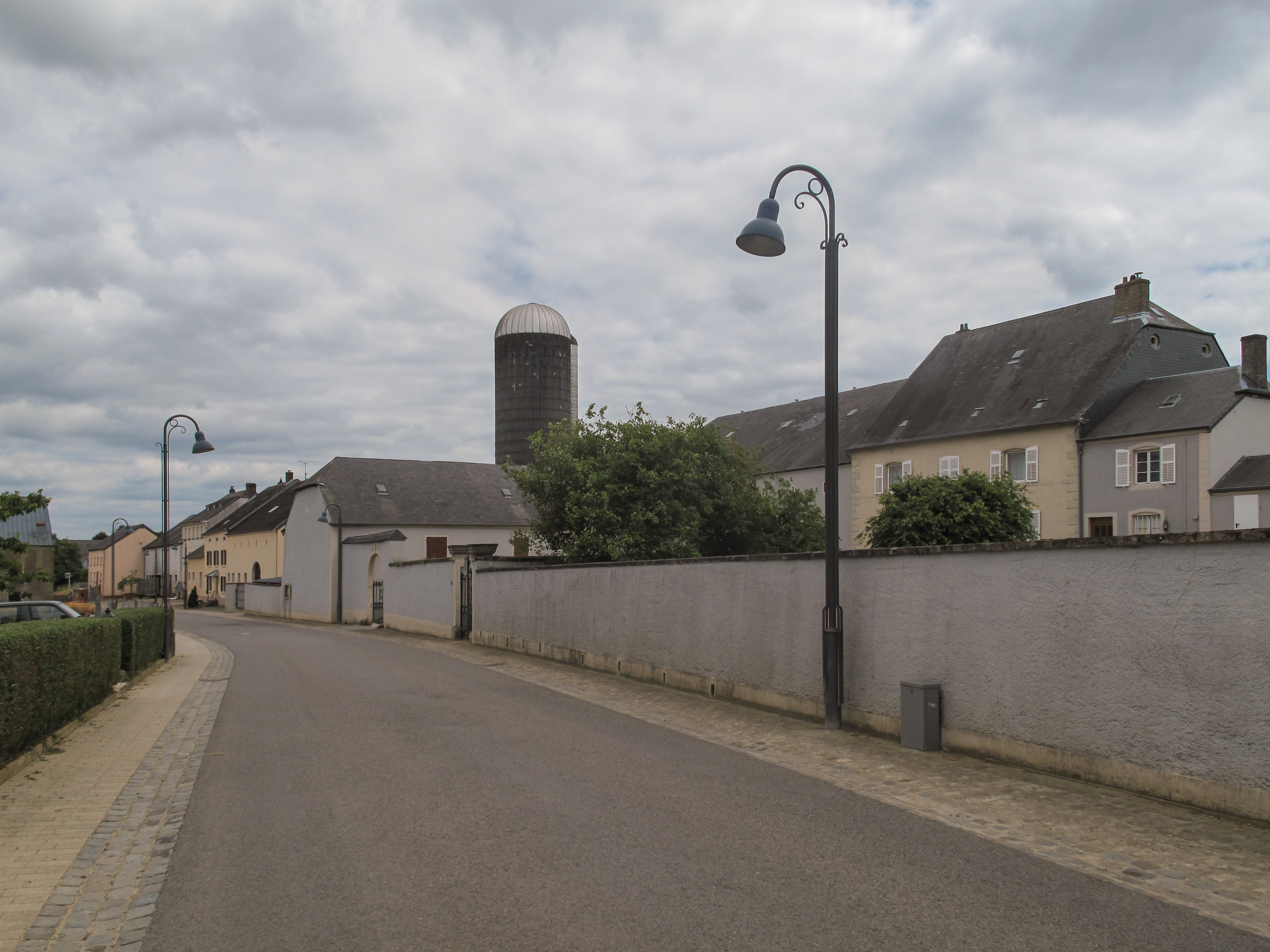
View to a street with watertower

Schweich (German pronunciation: [ʃvaɪç]; Luxembourgish: Schweech) is a village in the commune of Beckerich, in western Luxembourg. As of September 2026, the village has a population of 293.
