= Schoos =

Village in Luxembourg

Coordinates: 49°45′N 6°10′E

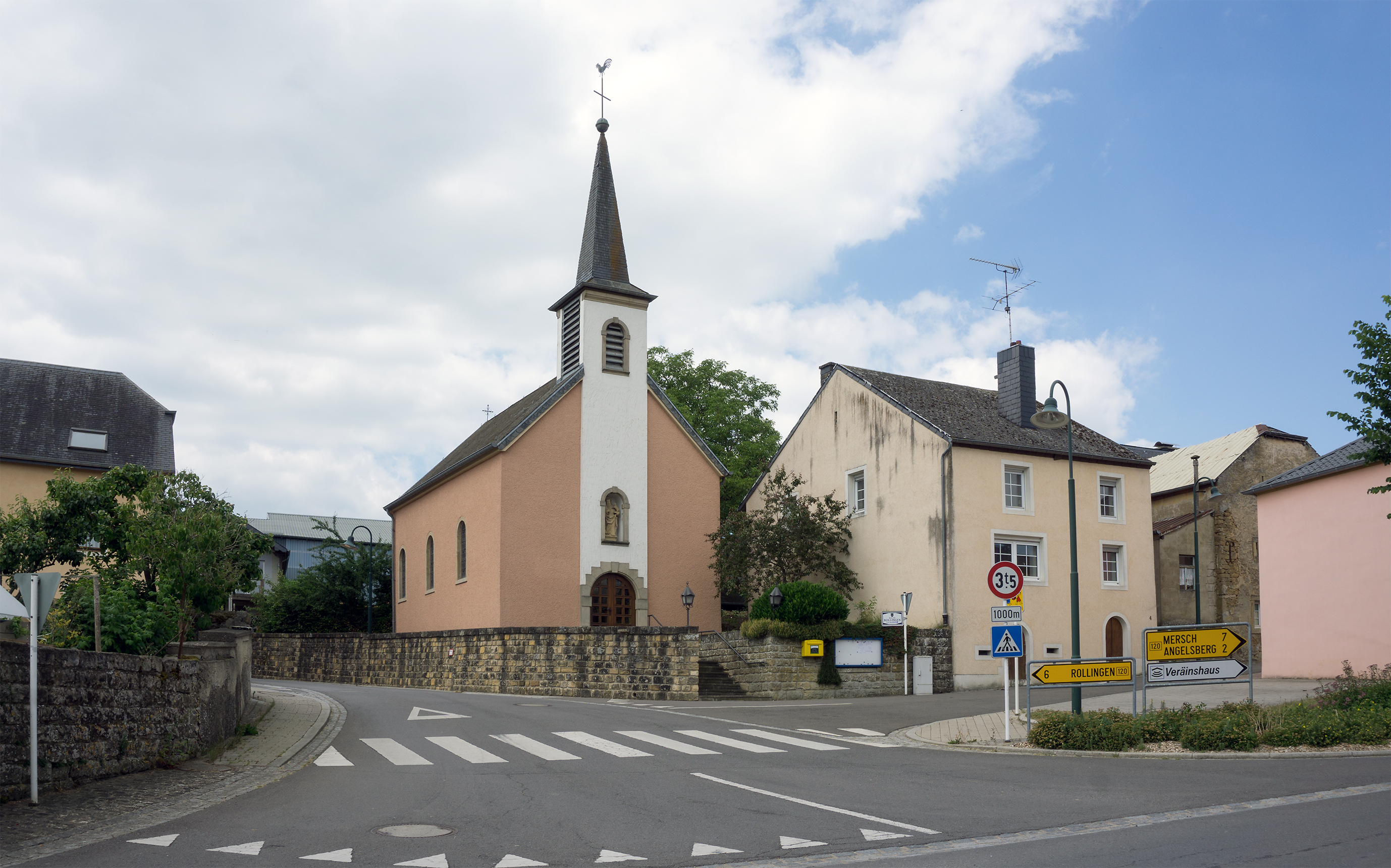
Church of Schoos

Schoos (German pronunciation: [ˈʃoːs]; Luxembourgish: Schous) is a village in the commune of Fischbach, in central Luxembourg. As of September 2026, the village has a population of 359.
