= Luxembourg District =

Coordinates: 49°35′N 6°10′E

The District of Luxembourg Luxembourgish: Distrikt Lëtzebuerg was one of three districts of Luxembourg. It contained four cantons divided into 44 communes. The district was the second largest and most populous in Luxembourg.

== Cantons and their communes ==
Map of Luxembourg district with its cantons in red

Canton	Commune
Capellen,	Dippach
Capellen,	Garnich
Capellen,	Habscht
Capellen,	Käerjeng
Capellen,	Kehlen
Capellen,	Koerich
Capellen,	Kopstal
Capellen,	Mamer
Capellen,	Steinfort
Esch-sur-Alzette	Bettembourg
Esch-sur-Alzette	Differdange
Esch-sur-Alzette	Dudelange
Esch-sur-Alzette	Esch-sur-Alzette
Esch-sur-Alzette	Frisange
Esch-sur-Alzette	Kayl
Esch-sur-Alzette	Leudelange
Esch-sur-Alzette	Mondercange
Esch-sur-Alzette	Pétange
Esch-sur-Alzette	Reckange-sur-Mess
Esch-sur-Alzette	Roeser
Esch-sur-Alzette	Rumelange
Esch-sur-Alzette	Sanem
Esch-sur-Alzette	Schifflange
Luxembourg	Bertrange
Luxembourg	Contern
Luxembourg	Hesperange
Luxembourg	Luxembourg
Luxembourg	Niederanven
Luxembourg	Sandweiler
Luxembourg	Schuttrange
Luxembourg	Steinsel
Luxembourg	Strassen
Luxembourg	Walferdange
Luxembourg	Weiler-la-Tour
Mersch	Bissen
Mersch	Colmar-Berg
Mersch	Fischbach
Mersch	Heffingen
Mersch	Helperknapp
Mersch	Larochette
Mersch	Lintgen
Mersch	Lorentzweiler
Mersch	Mersch
Mersch	Nommern

== Geography ==
It bordered the district of Grevenmacher to the east, the district of Diekirch to the north, the Belgian province of Luxembourg (Wallonia) to the west and the French Département of Moselle (Grand Est) to the south.

== History ==
When the districts were created on 24 February 1843, Luxembourg was one of the three of the country.

On 30 May 1857, the Mersch canton was taken from the Luxembourg district to made part of the new district of Mersch. on 4 May 1867, the new district was abolished and the Mersch canton was made again a part of the Luxembourg district.

After the reorganization of Luxembourg's administrative divisions in 2015, all three districts were abolished per 3 October 2015.
