= Districts of Luxembourg =

Former subdivisions of Luxembourg

Districts of Luxembourg

The three districts of Luxembourg (Note: French: district [distʁikt]; German: Distrikt [dɪsˈtʁɪkt]; Luxembourgish: Distrikt (Note: Plural: French: districts [distʁikt]; German: Distrikte [dɪsˈtʁɪktə]; Luxembourgish: Distrikter.)) were the top-level administrative divisions of the Grand Duchy of Luxembourg. The districts were further subdivided into cantons, which still exist.

Each district corresponded to a district commissionership (French: commissariat de district), headed by a district commissioner, which functionned as an intermediary between the state and communes, under the direct tutelage of the Ministry for Internal Affairs.

The districts were created by a law of 24 February 1843. In 1857, Mersch District was created from the cantons of Mersch and Redange; however, this fourth district was abolished in 1867, when the re-arrangements of 1857 were undone.

After a unanimous vote in the Chamber of Deputies, districts and their commissionerships were abolished on 3 October 2015, with commissionership staff reallocated to the Ministry for Internal Affairs. This left the communes, of which there are 100 as of 2025, as the sole local authorities of Luxembourg, as the 12 cantons are not administrative structures but rather territorial divisions used largely for statistical purposes.

District	Cantons	Area (km^{2})	Population (2015)
Diekirch	Clervaux, Diekirch, Redange, Vianden, Wiltz	1157.2	85,439
Grevenmacher	Echternach, Grevenmacher, Remich	664.4	66,207
Luxembourg	Capellen, Esch-sur-Alzette, Luxembourg, Mersch	904.3	411,312

== See also ==
- ISO 3166-2:LU
