= Diekirch District =

Coordinates: 49°55′N 6°00′E

Map of Diekirch district with its cantons in red

The District of Diekirch (Luxembourgish: Distrikt Dikrech) was one of three districts of Luxembourg. Immediately prior to its abolition on 3 October 2015, it contained five cantons divided into 42 communes:

Canton	Commune
Clervaux	Clervaux
Clervaux	Consthum
Clervaux	Heinerscheid
Clervaux	Hosingen
Clervaux	Munshausen
Clervaux	Troisvierges
Clervaux	Weiswampach
Clervaux	Wincrange
Diekirch	Bettendorf
Diekirch	Bourscheid
Diekirch	Diekirch
Diekirch	Ermsdorf
Diekirch	Erpeldange
Diekirch	Ettelbruck
Diekirch	Feulen
Diekirch	Hoscheid
Diekirch	Medernach
Diekirch	Mertzig
Diekirch	Reisdorf
Diekirch	Schieren
Redange	Beckerich
Redange	Ell
Redange	Grosbous
Redange	Préizerdaul
Redange	Rambrouch
Redange	Redange
Redange	Saeul
Redange	Useldange
Redange	Vichten
Redange	Wahl
Vianden	Putscheid
Vianden	Tandel
Vianden	Vianden
Wiltz	Boulaide
Wiltz	Esch-sur-Sûre
Wiltz	Goesdorf
Wiltz	Kiischpelt
Wiltz	Lac de la Haute-Sûre
Wiltz	Wiltz
Wiltz	Winseler

== Geography ==
To its west, the district of Diekirch bordered the Belgian province of Luxembourg in the region of Wallonia, whilst to its north was the Belgian providence of Liège. To its south were located the districts of Luxembourg and of Grevenmacher. The German state of Rhineland-Palatinate bordered Diekirch to its east.

== History ==
When the districts were created on 24 February 1843, Diekirch was one of the three of the country.

After the reorganization of Luxembourg's administrative divisions in 2015, all three districts were abolished per 3 October 2015.
