= Cantons of Luxembourg =

Administrative division of Luxembourg

The 12 cantons (French: canton [kɑ̃tɔ̃]; German: Kanton [kanˈtoːn]; Luxembourgish: Kanton [ˈkɑnton]) (Note: Plural: French: cantons [kɑ̃tɔ̃]; German: Kantone [kanˈtoːnə]; Luxembourgish: Kantonen [ˈkɑntonən] or Kantoner [ˈkɑntonɐ].) of the Grand Duchy of Luxembourg are subdivisions at the first level of local administrative unit (LAU-1) in the European Union's Nomenclature of Territorial Units for Statistics for Eurostat purposes. They were subdivisions of the three districts of Luxembourg until 2015, when the district level of government was abolished. The cantons are in turn subdivided into 100 communes (i.e. municipalities).

== Function ==
Unlike in Switzerland and similarly to France, Luxembourgish cantons have no administrative structure of their own—rather, they are used to delimit electoral constituencies and judicial districts. Until 2015, they also served to delimit Luxembourg's three districts.

== History ==
The origins of the cantons of Luxembourg lie in the decree of 31 August 1795 by the Committee of Public Safety during the French Revolutionary period. This established 37 cantons in the Département des Forêts, grouped into 4 arrondissements (districts): Bitbourg, Diekirch, Luxembourg, and Neufchâteau. The old feudal territorial divisions were replaced with a system of uniform administrative division into cantons of approximately equal size and population.

The decree of 6 March 1802 reduced the number of cantons in the department to 28.

This situation lasted until 1815, when the Congress of Vienna re-organised Europe's borders. The Duchy of Luxembourg lost its territories east of the Our, the Sauer and the Moselle rivers to Prussia. The subsequent administrative reorganisation divided Luxembourg into 32 cantons, grouped into five arrondissements: Marche, Saint-Hubert, Neufchâteau, Diekirch, and Luxembourg.

By royal decree of 2 January 1832, arrondissements were reduced in size, but their number increased from 5 to 8. They were now named quarters, and later, districts.

== List ==

The following list gives the names of the cantons in French and Luxembourgish (in that order) which are both official languages of the Grand Duchy of Luxembourg:

Name Luxembourgish name	Namesake commune	Chamber of Deputies constituency	Coat of arms	Area (km²)(2018)	Population (As of 2025)	Population Density Inhabitants/km^{2} (As of 2025)	Highest point	Lowest point
Clervaux Klierf	Clervaux	North	Armoiries Clervaux 2	342.17	21,873	63.9	560	230
Wiltz Wolz	Wiltz	North	Armoiries de Wiltz 1	264.55	19,944	75.4	537	233
Vianden Veianen	Vianden	North	Armoiries de Nassau 2	78.52	5,744	73.2	542	190
Redange Réiden	Redange	North	Coat of arms redange sur attert luxbrg	267.49	21,442	80.2	554	232
Diekirch Dikrech	Diekirch	North	Coat of arms diekirch luxbrg	204.51	36,240	177.2	525	175
Mersch Mersch	Mersch	Centre	Armoiries de Mersch 1	223.90	36,736	164.1	436	201
Echternach Iechternach	Echternach	East	Coat of arms echternach luxbrg	185.54	20,509	110.5	414	141
Capellen Capellen	Mamer	South	Armoiries de Septfontaines 1	199.21	55,513	278.7	398	242
Luxembourg Lëtzebuerg	Luxembourg City	Centre	Coat of arms Luxembourg City	238.46	210,561	883	429	228
Grevenmacher Gréiwemaacher	Grevenmacher	East	Coat of arms grevenmacher luxbrg	211.37	33,712	159.5	411	132
Esch-sur-Alzette Esch-Uelzecht	Esch-sur-Alzette	South	Coat of arms esch alzette luxbrg	242.77	195,091	803.6	435	224
Remich Réimech	Remich	East	Remich (canton) coat of arms	127.87	24,608	192.4	368	140

== Maps ==
Cantons of Luxembourg

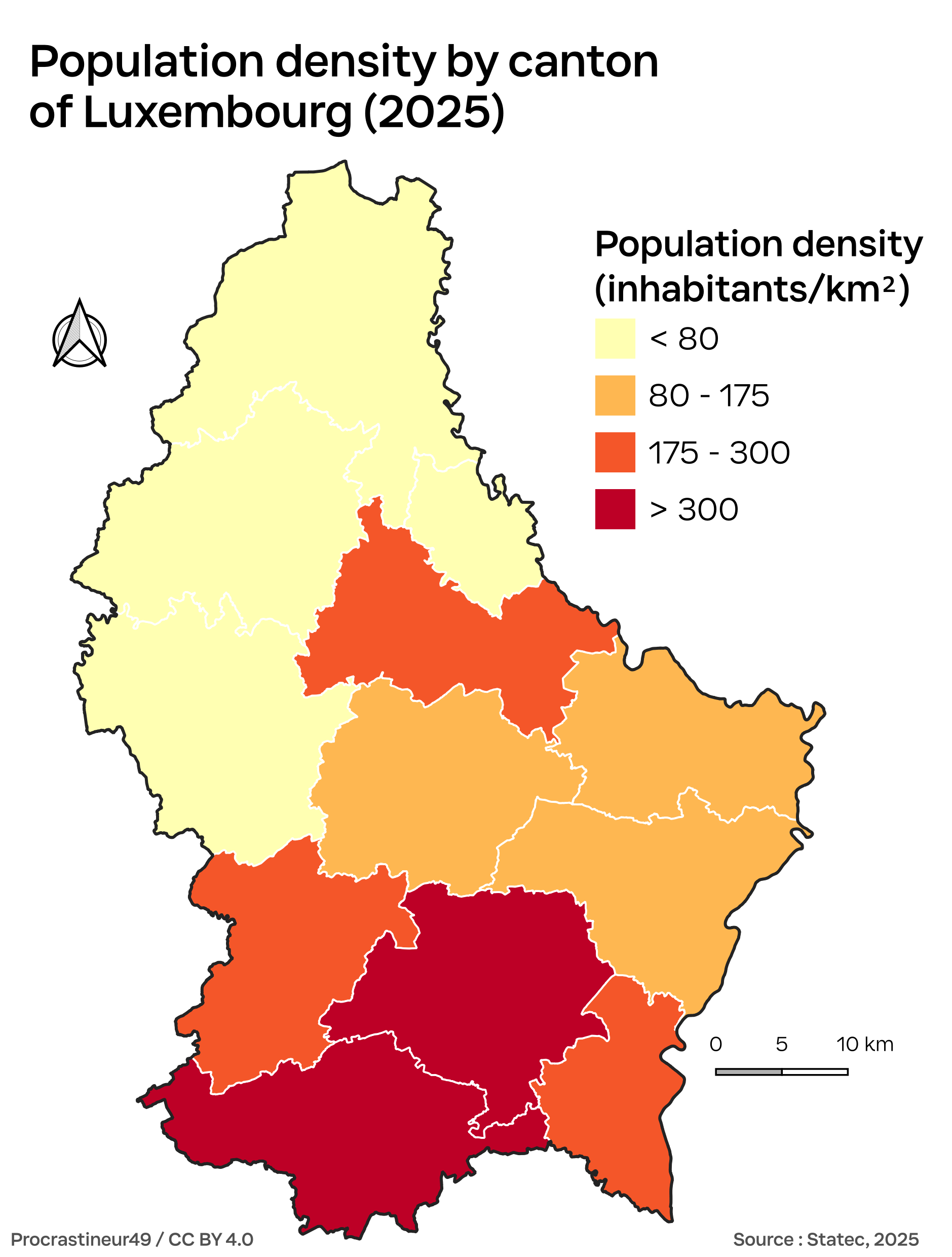
Cantons shaded by population density.

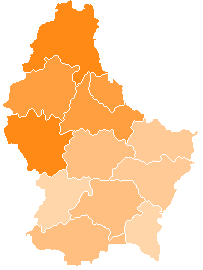
Cantons shaded by the highest point. Higher altitude is reflected by darker shades of orange.

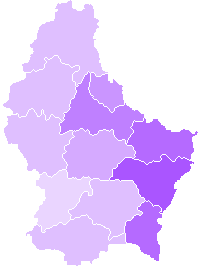
Cantons shaded by the lowest point. Lower altitude is reflected by darker shades of purple.

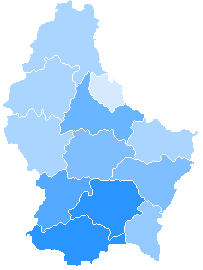
Cantons shaded by population. Larger population is reflected by darker shades of blue.

== See also ==
- Category:Cantons of Luxembourg
- ISO 3166-2:LU
