= List of populated places in Luxembourg =

This is a list of populated places in the Grand-Duchy of Luxembourg. It is based on the official database of the National Administration of Topography (Administration du cadastre et de la topographie - ACT).

Furthermore it provides the Communes and Cantons every settlement is located in.

The Luxembourgish names are based on the names recommended by the National Council for the Luxembourgish Language (Conseil permanent pour la langue luxembourgeoise - CPLL).

== Settlement types ==
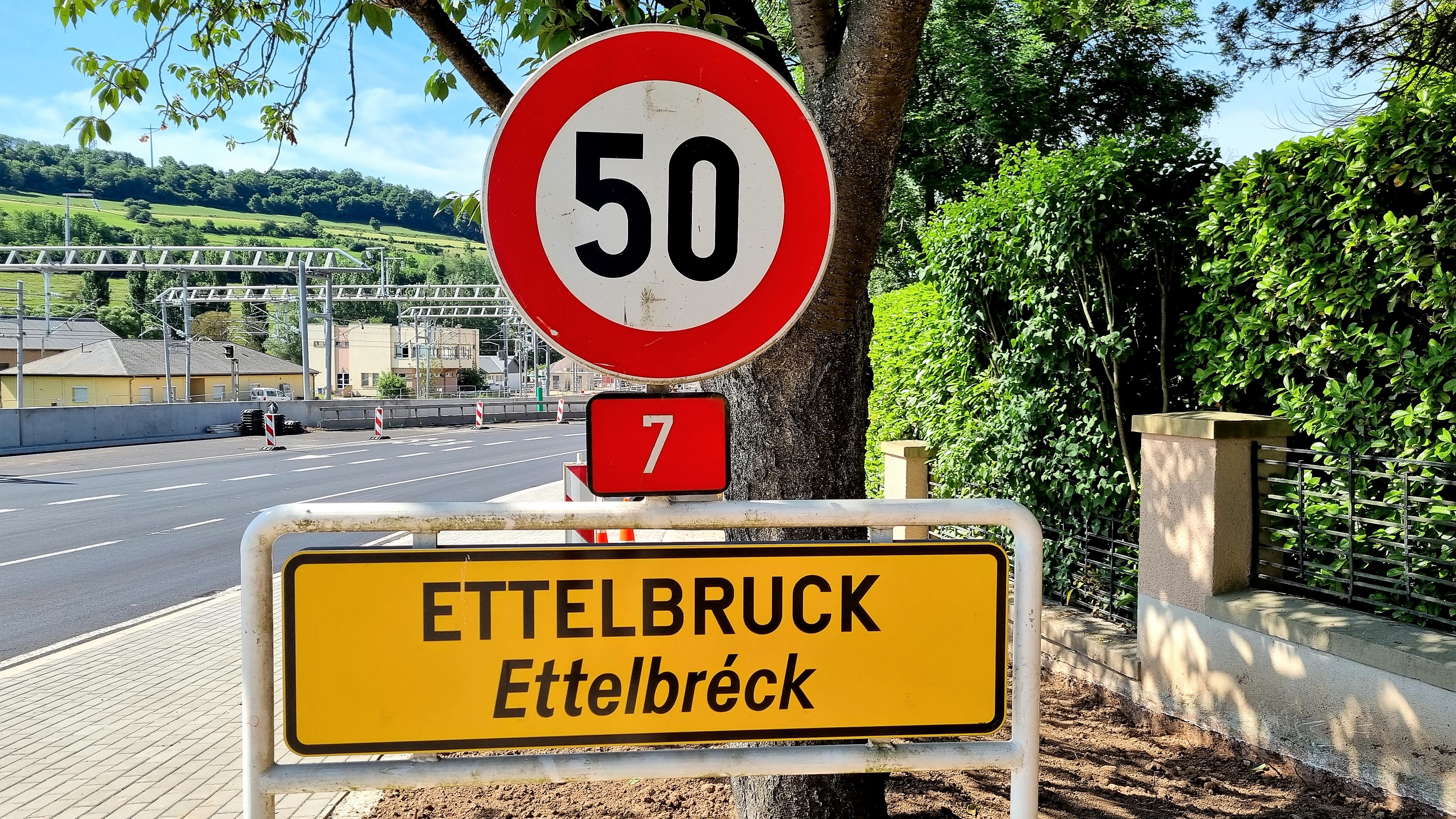
Yellow streetsign of the town of Ettelbruck

The settlement type describes the entity as which a settlement is administered.

The twelve towns of Luxembourg have special legal status and are appointed by law. In general, these are larger settlements of a few thousand people and of regional importance.

Villages are medium-sized settlements of usually a few hundred people. Every settlement classified as "official locality" (localité officielle) in the National Postal Register but not being appointed as town by law is classified as village in this list.

In Luxembourg, villages and towns are signposted by bilingual yellow streetsigns showing the official name (often in French) and the luxembourgish name of the locality.

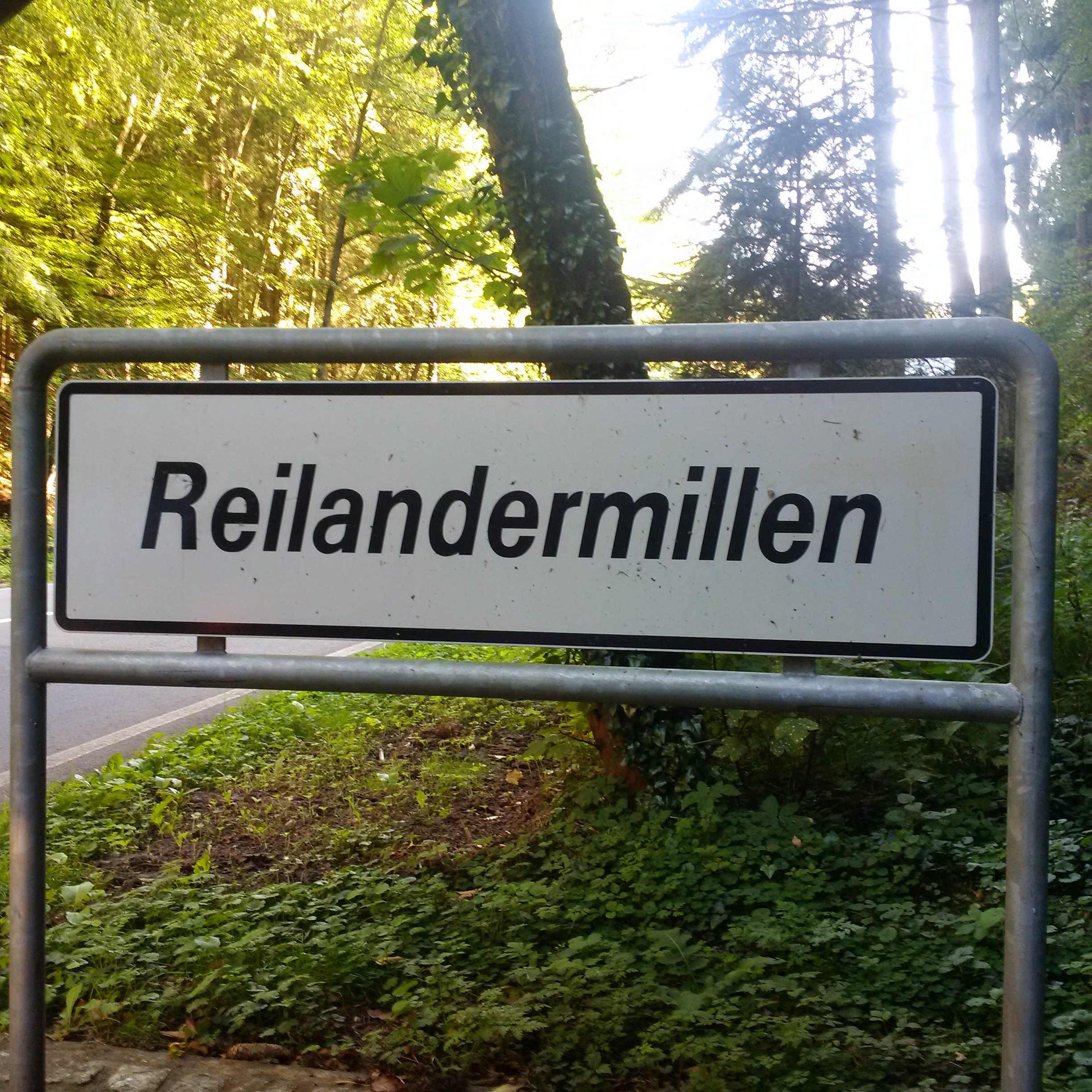
White streetsign of the lieu-dit Reuland-Moulin. Note that only the luxembourgish name is signposted.

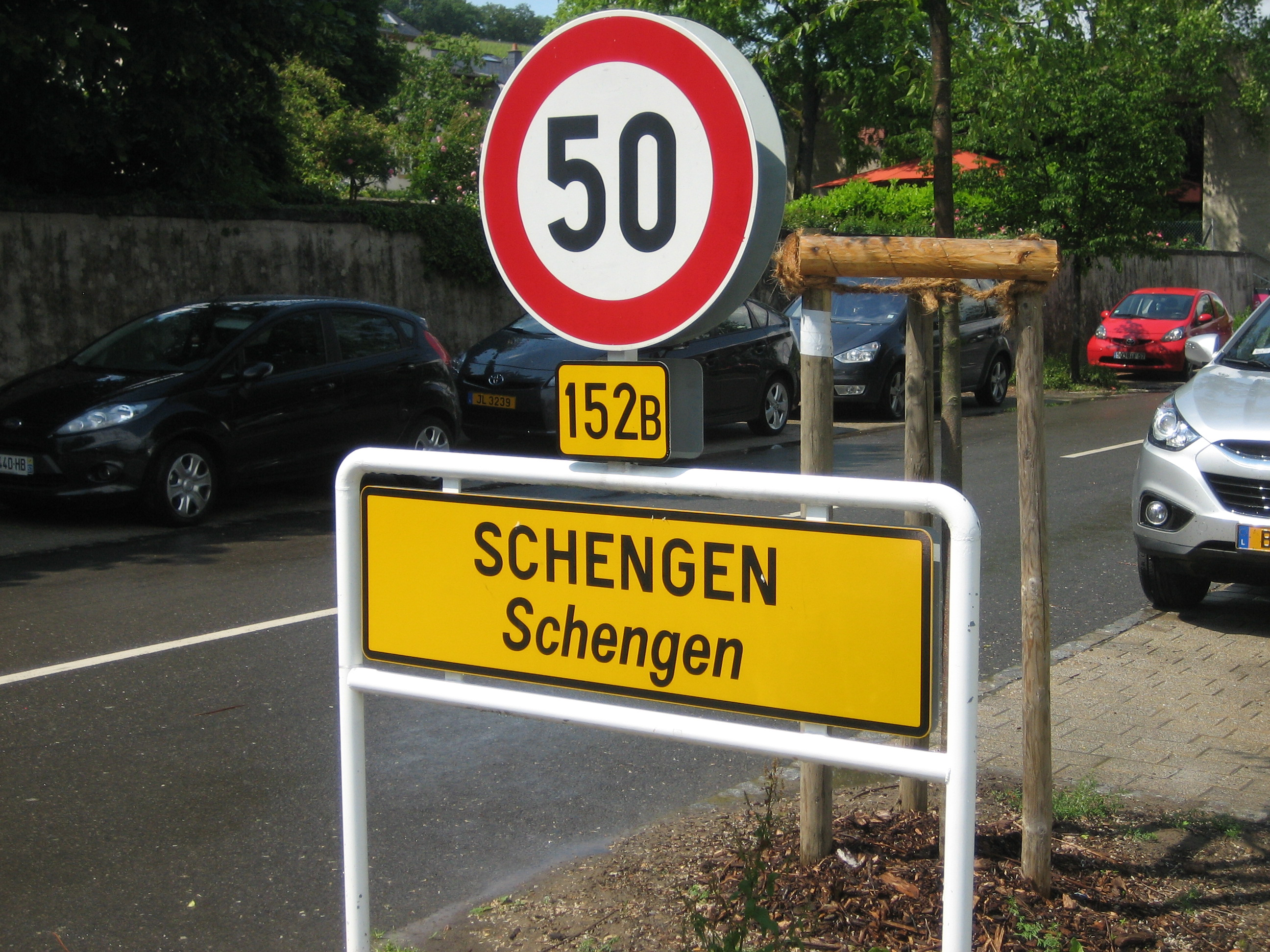
Yellow sign of the village of Schengen

Lieux-dits are named inhabited places that are smaller than villages and often only have few inhabitants. They might be isolated hamlets or farms that are located outside of villages, but are often administered as part of the nearest locality. In this list, settlements fitting none of the criteria of towns or villages are classified as "lieu-dit".

In Luxembourg, Lieux-dits are signposted by monolingual white streetsigns, showing only the luxembourgish name of the locality.

== Populated places in Luxembourg ==
Official name	Luxembourgish name	Canton	Municipality	Settlement type
Abweiler	Obeler	Esch/Alzette	Bettembourg	village
Aessen	Aessen	Esch/Alzette	Sanem	lieu-dit
Ahn	Ohn	Grevenmacher	Wormeldange	village
Akescht	Akescht	Clervaux	Parc Hosingen	lieu-dit
Alf	Aleft	Echternach	Echternach	lieu-dit
Allerborn	Allerbuer	Clervaux	Wincrange	village
Almillen	Almillen	Clervaux	Wincrange	lieu-dit
Alrodeschhaff	Alrodeschhaff	Echternach	Consdorf	lieu-dit
Alscheid	Alschent	Wiltz	Kiischpelt	village
Altlinster	Allënster	Grevenmacher	Junglinster	village
Altrier	Schanz	Echternach	Bech	village
Altwies	Altwis	Remich	Mondorf-les-Bains	village
Alzingen	Alzeng	Luxembourg	Hesperange	village
Angelsberg	Angelsbierg	Mersch	Fischbach	village
Ansembourg	Aansebuerg	Mersch	Helperknapp	village
Antoniushaff	Antoniushaff	Clervaux	Wincrange	lieu-dit
Arsdorf	Ueschdref	Redange	Rambrouch	village
Arsdorferhaff	Uerschterhaff	Esch/Alzette	Sanem	lieu-dit
Arsdorf-Moulin	Ueschdrëffer Millen	Redange	Rambrouch	lieu-dit
Aspelt	Uespelt	Esch/Alzette	Frisange	village
Assel	Aassel	Remich	Bous	village
Asselborn	Aasselbuer	Clervaux	Wincrange	village
Asselborn-Moulin	Aasselbuerer Millen	Clervaux	Wincrange	lieu-dit
Asselbur	Uesper	Diekirch	Bourscheid	lieu-dit
Asselscheuer	Aasselscheier	Mersch	Lorentzweiler	village
Bache-Jang	Baache Jang	Esch/Alzette	Differdange	lieu-dit
Bakesmillen	Bakesmillen	Diekirch	Vallée de l'Ernz	lieu-dit
Bamertal	Bamerdall	Diekirch	Diekirch	lieu-dit
Bamhaff	Bamhaff	Diekirch	Bourscheid	lieu-dit
Banzelt	Banzelt	Grevenmacher	Betzdorf	lieu-dit
Basbellain	Kierchen	Clervaux	Troisvierges	village
Bascharage	Nidderkäerjeng	Capellen	Käerjeng	village
Baschleiden	Baschelt	Wiltz	Boulaide	village
Bastendorf	Baastenduerf	Vianden	Tandel	village
Bavigne	Béiwen	Wiltz	Lac de la Haute-Sûre	village
Beaufort	Beefort	Echternach	Beaufort	village
Beaufort - Château	Beeforter Schlass	Echternach	Beaufort	lieu-dit
Beaufort (Ferme de-)(Bertrange)	Bouferterhaff	Luxembourg	Bertrange	lieu-dit
Bech	Bech	Echternach	Bech	village
Bech-Kleinmacher	Bech-Maacher	Remich	Schengen	village
Bech-Moulin	Becher Millen	Echternach	Bech	lieu-dit
Beckerich	Biekerech	Redange	Beckerich	village
Beeforterheed	Beeforter Heed	Echternach	Beaufort	lieu-dit
Beggen (Luxembourg)	Beggen	Luxembourg	Luxembourg	lieu-dit
Beidweiler	Beidler	Grevenmacher	Junglinster	village
Beiler	Beeler	Clervaux	Weiswampach	village
Belair (Luxembourg)	Belair	Luxembourg	Luxembourg	lieu-dit
Belenhaff	Beelenhaff	Grevenmacher	Junglinster	lieu-dit
Belvaux	Bieles	Esch/Alzette	Sanem	village
Berbourg	Berbuerg	Grevenmacher	Manternach	village
Berbourg (Ferme de)	Berbuerger Haff	Grevenmacher	Manternach	lieu-dit
Berchem	Bierchem	Esch/Alzette	Roeser	village
Berdorf	Bäerdref	Echternach	Berdorf	village
Bereldange	Bäreldeng	Luxembourg	Walferdange	village
Berenthal	Birendall	Capellen	Mamer	lieu-dit
Berg	Bierg	Grevenmacher	Betzdorf	village
Bergem	Biergem	Esch/Alzette	Mondercange	village
Berghaff	Bierghaff	Grevenmacher	Flaxweiler	lieu-dit
Beringen	Biereng	Mersch	Mersch	village
Beringerberg	Bierengerbierg	Mersch	Mersch	lieu-dit
Berlé	Bärel	Wiltz	Winseler	village
Berschbach	Bierschbech	Mersch	Mersch	lieu-dit
Bertrange	Bartreng	Luxembourg	Bertrange	village
Bettange-sur-Mess	Betteng op der Mess	Capellen	Dippach	village
Bettborn	Biebereg	Redange	Préizerdaul	village
Bettel	Bëttel	Vianden	Tandel	village
Bettembourg	Beetebuerg	Esch/Alzette	Bettembourg	village
Bettendorf	Bettenduerf	Diekirch	Bettendorf	village
Betzdorf	Betzder	Grevenmacher	Betzdorf	village
Betzemillen	Betzemillen	Mersch	Helperknapp	lieu-dit
Beyren	Beyren	Grevenmacher	Flaxweiler	village
Biergerkräiz	Biergerkräiz	Capellen	Kopstal	lieu-dit
Bigelbach	Bigelbaach	Diekirch	Reisdorf	village
Bigonville	Bungeref	Redange	Rambrouch	village
Bigonville-Moulin	Bungerëffer Millen	Redange	Rambrouch	lieu-dit
Bigonville-Poteau	Kimm	Redange	Rambrouch	village
Bildgeshaff	Bildgeshaff	Diekirch	Bettendorf	lieu-dit
Bill	Bill	Mersch	Helperknapp	village
Bilsdorf	Bilschdref	Redange	Rambrouch	village
Binsfeld	Bënzelt	Clervaux	Weiswampach	village
Binzrath	Bënzert	Mersch	Mersch	lieu-dit
Birelerhaff	Bireler Haff	Luxembourg	Sandweiler	lieu-dit
Birkelt	Bierkelt	Echternach	Berdorf	lieu-dit
Birkenhaff	Bierkenhaff	Diekirch	Schieren	lieu-dit
Birtrange	Biertreng	Diekirch	Schieren	village
Bissen	Biissen	Mersch	Bissen	village
Bissen-Moulin	Biisser Millen	Mersch	Bissen	lieu-dit
Bivange	Béiweng	Esch/Alzette	Roeser	village
Bivels	Biwels	Vianden	Putscheid	village
Biwer	Biwer	Grevenmacher	Biwer	village
Biwerbach	Biwerbaach	Grevenmacher	Biwer	village
Biwisch	Biwesch	Clervaux	Troisvierges	village
Blaschette	Blaaschent	Mersch	Lorentzweiler	village
Bleesbrück	Bleesbréck	Diekirch	Bettendorf	lieu-dit
Bleesmillen	Bleesmillen	Vianden	Tandel	lieu-dit
Bloëbierg	Bloebierg	Luxembourg	Niederanven	lieu-dit
Blumenthal	Blummendall	Grevenmacher	Junglinster	village
Blumenthal	Blummendall	Echternach	Bech	village
Bockholtz	Boukels	Clervaux	Parc Hosingen	village
Bockholtz (Goesdorf)	Boukels	Wiltz	Goesdorf	village
Bockholtz-Moulin	Boukelsser Millen	Wiltz	Goesdorf	lieu-dit
Bockmillen	Bockmillen	Clervaux	Wincrange	lieu-dit
Boevange	Béigen	Clervaux	Wincrange	village
Boevange-sur-Attert	Béiwen-Atert	Mersch	Helperknapp	village
Bofferdange	Boufer	Mersch	Lorentzweiler	village
Bollendorf-Pont	Bollenduerfer Bréck	Echternach	Berdorf	village
Bomicht	Bomecht	Capellen	Käerjeng	lieu-dit
Bomillen	Bomillen	Luxembourg	Schuttrange	lieu-dit
Bommelscheuer	Bommelscheier	Capellen	Käerjeng	lieu-dit
Bonnal	Bommel	Wiltz	Esch-sur-Sûre	village
Bonnevoie (Luxembourg)	Bouneweg	Luxembourg	Luxembourg	lieu-dit
Born	Bur	Echternach	Rosport-Mompach	village
Born-Moulin	Buerer Millen	Echternach	Rosport-Mompach	lieu-dit
Boudler	Buddeler	Grevenmacher	Biwer	village
Boudlerbach	Bouddelerbaach	Grevenmacher	Biwer	village
Boulaide	Bauschelt	Wiltz	Boulaide	village
Boulaide-Moulin	Bauschelter Millen	Wiltz	Boulaide	lieu-dit
Bour	Buer	Mersch	Helperknapp	village
Bourglinster	Buerglënster	Grevenmacher	Junglinster	village
Bourglinster - Château	Buerg	Grevenmacher	Junglinster	lieu-dit
Bourscheid	Buerschent	Diekirch	Bourscheid	village
Bourscheid - Château	Buerschter Schlass	Diekirch	Bourscheid	lieu-dit
Bourscheid-Moulin	Buerschter Millen	Diekirch	Bourscheid	village
Bourscheid-Plage	Buerschter Plage	Diekirch	Bourscheid	village
Boursdorf	Buerschdref	Echternach	Rosport-Mompach	village
BOUS	Bous	Remich	Bous	village
Boxhorn	Boxer	Clervaux	Wincrange	village
Brachtenbach	Bruechtebaach	Clervaux	Wincrange	village
Brahmillen	Bramillen	Diekirch	Bourscheid	lieu-dit
Brameschhaff	Brameschhaff	Capellen	Kehlen	lieu-dit
Brandenbourg	Branebuerg	Vianden	Tandel	village
Brattert	Brattert	Redange	Wahl	village
Brehm	Bréim	Remich	Mondorf-les-Bains	lieu-dit
Breidfeld	Breedelt	Clervaux	Weiswampach	village
Breidweiler	Präiteler	Echternach	Consdorf	village
Breinert	Breinert	Grevenmacher	Biwer	village
Bricherhaff (Neudorf)	Bricherhaff	Luxembourg	Luxembourg	lieu-dit
Bridel	Briddel	Capellen	Kopstal	village
Broderbour	Brouderbuer	Diekirch	Bettendorf	lieu-dit
Brongeshaff	Brongeschhaff	Mersch	Colmar-Berg	lieu-dit
Brosiushaff	Brosiushaff	Mersch	Colmar-Berg	lieu-dit
Brouch	Bruch	Mersch	Helperknapp	village
Brouch	Bruch	Grevenmacher	Biwer	village
Brouch-Moulin	Bricher Millen	Mersch	Helperknapp	lieu-dit
Brücherheck	Brücherheck	Diekirch	Vallée de l'Ernz	lieu-dit
Brücherhof (Folkendange)	Brücherhaff	Diekirch	Vallée de l'Ernz	lieu-dit
Brücherhof (Moutfort)	Bricherhaff	Luxembourg	Contern	lieu-dit
Brüchermühle (Moutfort)	Brichermillen	Luxembourg	Contern	lieu-dit
Bücherhof	Bicherhaff	Remich	Stadtbredimus	lieu-dit
Buchholz (Flaxweiler)	Buchholz	Grevenmacher	Flaxweiler	lieu-dit
Buchholzerhaff (Dalheim)	Buchholzer Haff	Remich	Dalheim	lieu-dit
Budersberg (Dudelange)	Butschebuerg	Esch/Alzette	Dudelange	lieu-dit
Buederscheid	Bidscht	Wiltz	Goesdorf	village
Buerghaff	Buerghaff	Mersch	Nommern	lieu-dit
Burange (Dudelange)	Biereng	Esch/Alzette	Dudelange	lieu-dit
Burden	Bierden	Diekirch	Erpeldange-sur-Sûre	village
Burfelt	Buerfelt	Wiltz	Esch-sur-Sûre	lieu-dit
Burmerange	Biermereng	Remich	Schengen	village
Buschdorf	Bëschdref	Mersch	Helperknapp	village
Buschrodt	Bëschrued	Redange	Wahl	village
Calmus	Kaalmes	Redange	Saeul	village
Calmus-Moulin	Kaalmesser Millen	Redange	Saeul	lieu-dit
Canach	Kanech	Remich	Lenningen	village
Cap	Cap	Capellen	Mamer	lieu-dit
Capellen	Capellen	Capellen	Mamer	village
Carelshaff	Karelshaff	Mersch	Colmar-Berg	lieu-dit
Cents (Luxembourg)	Zens	Luxembourg	Luxembourg	lieu-dit
Cessange (Luxembourg)	Zéisseng	Luxembourg	Luxembourg	lieu-dit
Christnach	Chrëschtnech	Echternach	Waldbillig	village
Cinqfontaines	Pafemillen	Clervaux	Wincrange	village
Clausen (Luxembourg)	Clausen	Luxembourg	Luxembourg	lieu-dit
Claushof	Klaushaff	Mersch	Helperknapp	village
Clemency	Kënzeg	Capellen	Käerjeng	village
Clemenshaff	Clemenshaff	Diekirch	Bettendorf	lieu-dit
Clervaux	Clierf	Clervaux	Clervaux	village
Clervaux- Château	Clierfer Schlass	Clervaux	Clervaux	lieu-dit
Cloche d'Or (Luxembourg)	Cloche d'Or	Luxembourg	Luxembourg	lieu-dit
Closbierg	Closbierg	Echternach	Beaufort	lieu-dit
Closdelt	Closdellt	Diekirch	Bourscheid	village
Colbette	Kolwent	Echternach	Consdorf	village
Colmar	Colmer	Mersch	Colmar-Berg	lieu-dit
Colmar-Berg	Colmer-Bierg	Mersch	Colmar-Berg	village
Colmar-Berg-Halte	Colmer Halt	Diekirch	Schieren	lieu-dit
Colmar-Pont	Colmer Bréck	Diekirch	Schieren	village
Colpach-Bas	Nidderkolpech	Redange	Ell	village
Colpach-Haut	Uewerkolpech	Redange	Ell	village
Consdorf	Konsdref	Echternach	Consdorf	village
Consdorf-Moulin	Konsdrëffer Millen	Echternach	Consdorf	lieu-dit
Consthum	Konstem	Clervaux	Parc Hosingen	village
Contern	Conter	Luxembourg	Contern	village
Cornelysmillen	Cornelysmillen	Clervaux	Troisvierges	lieu-dit
Crauthem	Krautem	Esch/Alzette	Roeser	village
Crendal	Kréindel	Clervaux	Wincrange	village
Cruchten	Kruuchten	Mersch	Nommern	village
Dahl	Dol	Wiltz	Goesdorf	village
Dahlem	Duelem	Capellen	Garnich	village
Dalheim	Duelem	Remich	Dalheim	village
Dasbourg-Pont	Doosber Bréck	Clervaux	Parc Hosingen	lieu-dit
Deiffelt	Deewelt	Clervaux	Wincrange	village
Dellen	Dellen	Redange	Grosbous	village
Derenbach	Déierbech	Clervaux	Wincrange	village
Deysermühle	Deisermillen	Grevenmacher	Grevenmacher	lieu-dit
Dickeschbur	Dickeschbur	Wiltz	Esch-sur-Sûre	lieu-dit
Dickweiler	Dickweiler	Echternach	Rosport-Mompach	village
Diekirch	Dikrech	Diekirch	Diekirch	town
Differdange	Déifferdeng	Esch/Alzette	Differdange	town
Dillingen	Déiljen	Echternach	Beaufort	village
Dippach	Dippech	Capellen	Dippach	village
Dippach-Gare	Dippecher Gare	Capellen	Dippach	lieu-dit
Dippach-Haard		Capellen	Dippach	lieu-dit
Dirbach	Dierbech	Diekirch	Bourscheid	village
Dirbach	Dierbech	Wiltz	Esch-sur-Sûre	village
Dirbach (Goesdorf)	Dierbech	Wiltz	Goesdorf	village
Doennange	Diänjen	Clervaux	Wincrange	village
Domaine d'Olm		Capellen	Kehlen	lieu-dit
Dommeldange (Luxembourg)	Dummeldeng	Luxembourg	Luxembourg	lieu-dit
Doncols	Donkels	Wiltz	Winseler	village
Dondelange	Dondel	Capellen	Kehlen	village
Dorscheid	Duerscht	Clervaux	Parc Hosingen	village
Dorscheiderhaischen	Duerschter Haischen	Clervaux	Parc Hosingen	lieu-dit
Dosterthaff / Dousterterhaff	Dousterterhaff	Echternach	Berdorf	lieu-dit
Drauffelt	Draufelt	Clervaux	Clervaux	village
Dreiborn	Dräibuer	Grevenmacher	Wormeldange	village
Drinklange	Drénkelt	Clervaux	Troisvierges	village
Dudderhaff	Dudderhaff	Luxembourg	Luxembourg	lieu-dit
Dudelange	Diddeleng	Esch/Alzette	Dudelange	town
Dumontshaff / Dumongshaff	Dumongshaff	Esch/Alzette	Schifflange	lieu-dit
Durenthal	Direndall	Capellen	Kehlen	lieu-dit
Echternach	Iechternach	Echternach	Echternach	town
Ehlange	Éileng	Esch/Alzette	Reckange-sur-Mess	village
Ehlerange	Éilereng	Esch/Alzette	Sanem	village
Ehnen	Éinen	Grevenmacher	Wormeldange	village
Ehner	Iener	Redange	Saeul	village
Eich (Luxembourg)	Eech	Luxembourg	Luxembourg	lieu-dit
Eichelbour	Eechelbuer	Mersch	Nommern	lieu-dit
Eischen	Äischen	Capellen	Habscht	village
Eisenbach	Eesbech	Clervaux	Parc Hosingen	village
Eisenborn	Eesebuer	Grevenmacher	Junglinster	village
Ell	Ell	Redange	Ell	village
Ellange	Elleng	Remich	Mondorf-les-Bains	village
Ellange-Gare	Ellenger Gare	Remich	Mondorf-les-Bains	lieu-dit
Eltz	Elz	Redange	Redange/Attert	village
Elvange	Ielwen	Redange	Beckerich	village
Elvange	Elweng	Remich	Schengen	village
Emerange	Éimereng	Remich	Schengen	village
Emeringerhaff / Éimeréngerhaff	Emeringerhaff	Remich	Bous	lieu-dit
Emeschbach Asselborn	Éimeschbaach	Clervaux	Wincrange	lieu-dit
Engelshaff	Engelshaff	Luxembourg	Niederanven	lieu-dit
Enscherange	Äischer	Wiltz	Kiischpelt	village
Enteschbach	Enteschbaach	Diekirch	Bourscheid	village
Eppeldorf	Eppelduerf	Diekirch	Vallée de l'Ernz	village
Ermsdorf	Iermsdref	Diekirch	Vallée de l'Ernz	village
Ernster	Iernster	Luxembourg	Niederanven	village
Ernzen	Iernzen	Mersch	Larochette	village
Erpeldange	Ierpeldeng	Wiltz	Wiltz	village
Erpeldange	Ierpeldeng	Remich	Bous	village
Erpeldange-sur-Sûre	Ierpeldeng-Sauer	Diekirch	Erpeldange-sur-Sûre	village
Ersange	Ierseng	Remich	Waldbredimus	village
Esch-Belval	Belval	Esch/Alzette	Esch-sur-Alzette	lieu-dit
Eschdorf	Eschduerf	Wiltz	Esch-sur-Sûre	village
Eschette	Éischt	Redange	Rambrouch	village
Esch-sur-Alzette	Esch-Uelzecht	Esch/Alzette	Esch-sur-Alzette	town
Esch-sur-Sûre	Esch-Sauer	Wiltz	Esch-sur-Sûre	village
Eschweiler	Eschweiler	Wiltz	Wiltz	village
Eschweiler	Eescheler	Grevenmacher	Junglinster	village
Eschweiler-Halte	Café Halt	Wiltz	Wiltz	lieu-dit
Eselborn	Eeselbuer	Clervaux	Clervaux	village
Essingen	Essen	Mersch	Mersch	village
Ettelbruck	Ettelbréck	Diekirch	Ettelbruck	towns
Everlange	Iewerleng	Redange	Useldange	village
Everlange-Moulin	Iewerlenger Millen	Redange	Useldange	lieu-dit
Fausermillen	Fausermillen	Grevenmacher	Mertert	lieu-dit
Féischterbierg	Féischterbierg	Diekirch	Bourscheid	lieu-dit
Féischterhaff	Féischterhaff	Diekirch	Bourscheid	lieu-dit
Féitsch	Féitsch	Clervaux	Wincrange	lieu-dit
Felleschmillen	Felleschmillen	Capellen	Habscht	lieu-dit
Fennange	Fenneng	Esch/Alzette	Bettembourg	village
Fënsterhaff	Fënsterhaff	Redange	Redange/Attert	lieu-dit
Fentange	Fenteng	Luxembourg	Hesperange	village
Fënz	Fënz	Clervaux	Wincrange	lieu-dit
Ferme rouge (Rodange)	Roudenhaff	Esch/Alzette	Pétange	lieu-dit
Fetschenhof (Luxembourg)	Fetschenhaff	Luxembourg	Luxembourg	lieu-dit
FEULEN	Feelen	Diekirch	Feulen	lieu-dit
Fielsmillen (Echternach)	Fielsmillen	Echternach	Echternach	lieu-dit
Fielsmillen (Mertert)	Fielsmillen	Grevenmacher	Mertert	lieu-dit
Filsdorf	Fëlschdref	Remich	Dalheim	village
Findel	Findel	Luxembourg	Sandweiler	village
Findels (Ferme de)	Findelshaff	Luxembourg	Bertrange	lieu-dit
Fingig	Féngeg	Capellen	Käerjeng	village
Finsterthal	Fënsterdall	Mersch	Helperknapp	village
Firtgeshaff	Fiertgeshaff	Diekirch	Vallée de l'Ernz	lieu-dit
Fischbach	Fëschbech	Mersch	Fischbach	village
Fischbach	Fëschbech	Clervaux	Clervaux	village
Fischbacherhaff	Fëschbecher Haff	Vianden	Tandel	lieu-dit
Flatzbour	Flatzbuer	Redange	Rambrouch	village
Flaxweiler	Fluessweiler	Grevenmacher	Flaxweiler	village
Flebour	Fléiber	Diekirch	Bourscheid	village
Flebour (Baschleiden)	Fléiber	Wiltz	Boulaide	lieu-dit
Flickenhaff / Fleckenhaff	Fléckenhaff	Echternach	Waldbillig	lieu-dit
Fockemillen	Fockemillen	Capellen	Koerich	lieu-dit
Foetz	Féiz	Esch/Alzette	Mondercange	village
Folkendange	Folkendeng	Diekirch	Vallée de l'Ernz	village
Follmillen	Follmillen	Diekirch	Vallée de l'Ernz	lieu-dit
Folschette	Folscht	Redange	Rambrouch	village
Fond de Gras	Fond de Gras	Esch/Alzette	Differdange	lieu-dit
Fossenhof	Fossenhaff	Clervaux	Clervaux	village
Fouhren	Furen	Vianden	Tandel	village
Fousbann (Differdange)	Fuussbann	Esch/Alzette	Differdange	lieu-dit
Freckeisen	Freckeisen	Echternach	Waldbillig	village
Fréngerhaff	Fréngerhaff	Vianden	Tandel	lieu-dit
Freresmühle	Fréiresmillen	Wiltz	Kiischpelt	lieu-dit
Fridhaff	Fridhaff	Diekirch	Diekirch	lieu-dit
Friedbusch	Friddbësch	Diekirch	Bourscheid	village
Frisange	Fréiseng	Esch/Alzette	Frisange	village
Frombuerg / Fromburgerhaff	Frombuerger Haff	Echternach	Rosport-Mompach	lieu-dit
Froumillen	Froumillen	Remich	Schengen	lieu-dit
Furels	Furels	Mersch	Heffingen	lieu-dit
Fuussekaul	Fuussekaul	Wiltz	Esch-sur-Sûre	lieu-dit
Fuusswiss	Fuusswiss	Diekirch	Feulen	lieu-dit
Gaaschtmillen	Gaaschtmillen	Capellen	Mamer	lieu-dit
Gaichel	Gäichel	Capellen	Habscht	lieu-dit
Gantebeensmillen	Gantebeensmillen	Luxembourg	Hesperange	lieu-dit
Garnich	Garnech	Capellen	Garnich	village
Gasperich (Luxembourg)	Gaasperech	Luxembourg	Luxembourg	lieu-dit
Geierhaff (Holzthum)	Geierhaff	Clervaux	Parc Hosingen	lieu-dit
Geyershof	Geieschhaff	Echternach	Bech	village
Gillenshaff	Gillenshaff	Diekirch	Vallée de l'Ernz	lieu-dit
Gilsdorf	Gilsdref	Diekirch	Bettendorf	village
Girst	Giischt	Echternach	Rosport-Mompach	village
Girsterklaus	Giischterklaus	Echternach	Rosport-Mompach	village
Givenich	Giwenech	Echternach	Rosport-Mompach	village
Goberhaff	Goeberhaff	Diekirch	Reisdorf	lieu-dit
Godbrange	Guedber	Grevenmacher	Junglinster	village
Goebelsmuehle	Giewelsmillen	Diekirch	Bourscheid	village
Goebelsmühle	Giewelsmillen	Diekirch	Bourscheid	village
Goeblange	Giewel	Capellen	Koerich	village
Goedange	Géidgen	Clervaux	Troisvierges	village
Goedange-Moulin	Géidger Millen	Clervaux	Troisvierges	lieu-dit
Goelt	Gëlt	Redange	Rambrouch	lieu-dit
Goesdorf	Géisdref	Wiltz	Goesdorf	village
Goetzingen	Gëtzen	Capellen	Koerich	village
Gondelange	Gondel	Remich	Waldbredimus	lieu-dit
Gonderange	Gonnereng	Grevenmacher	Junglinster	village
Gosseldange	Gousseldeng	Mersch	Lintgen	village
Gostingen	Gouschteng	Grevenmacher	Flaxweiler	village
Goudelt	Guddelt	Mersch	Larochette	lieu-dit
Gralingen	Grooljen	Vianden	Putscheid	village
Grand-Bevange (Hivange)	Groussbéiwen	Capellen	Garnich	lieu-dit
Grass	Grass	Capellen	Steinfort	village
Grassbusch (Leudelange)	Grasbësch	Esch/Alzette	Leudelange	lieu-dit
Grauenstein	Groesteen	Vianden	Putscheid	lieu-dit
Graulinster	Grolënster	Grevenmacher	Junglinster	village
Graulinster	Grolënster	Echternach	Bech	village
Greisch	Gräisch	Capellen	Habscht	village
Greiveldange	Greiweldeng	Remich	Stadtbredimus	village
Grentzingen	Grenzen	Diekirch	Ettelbruck	village
Grevels	Gréiwels	Redange	Wahl	village
Grevels (Ferme de) (Bertrange)	Gréiwelsser Haff	Luxembourg	Bertrange	lieu-dit
Grevelsbarrière (Bertrange)	Gréiwelsser Barrière	Luxembourg	Bertrange	lieu-dit
Grevenhaff	Grewenhaff	Diekirch	Vallée de l'Ernz	lieu-dit
Grevenknapp	Gréiweknapp	Mersch	Helperknapp	village
Grevenmacher	Gréiwemaacher	Grevenmacher	Grevenmacher	town
Grindhausen	Grandsen	Clervaux	Clervaux	village
Grosbous	Groussbus	Redange	Grosbous	village
Gruemelscheid	Grëmmelescht	Wiltz	Winseler	village
Grund (Luxembourg)	Gronn	Luxembourg	Luxembourg	lieu-dit
Grundhof	Grondhaff	Echternach	Beaufort	village
Grundhof	Grondhaff	Echternach	Waldbillig	village
Grundhof - Château	Grondhaff-Schlass	Echternach	Waldbillig	lieu-dit
Grundhof (Berdorf)	Grondhaff	Echternach	Berdorf	village
Haanenhaff	Hanenhaff	Clervaux	Wincrange	lieu-dit
Haarderbaach	Haarderbaach	Wiltz	Goesdorf	lieu-dit
Hachiville	Helzen	Clervaux	Wincrange	village
Hagelsdorf	Haastert	Grevenmacher	Biwer	village
Hagen	Hoen	Capellen	Steinfort	village
Hakenhaff	Hakenhaff	Remich	Lenningen	lieu-dit
Haller	Haler	Echternach	Waldbillig	village
Halsbaach	Haalsbaach	Echternach	Berdorf	lieu-dit
Hamiville	Heesdref	Clervaux	Wincrange	village
Hamm (Luxembourg)	Hamm	Luxembourg	Luxembourg	lieu-dit
Hammhaff	Hammhaff	Echternach	Berdorf	lieu-dit
Hardhaff	Haarthaff	Echternach	Waldbillig	lieu-dit
Harlange	Harel	Wiltz	Lac de la Haute-Sûre	village
Harlange-Poteau	Hareler Poteau	Wiltz	Boulaide	lieu-dit
Hassel	Haassel	Luxembourg	Weiler-la-Tour	village
Hautbellain	Beesslek	Clervaux	Troisvierges	village
Hautcharage	Uewerkäerjeng	Capellen	Käerjeng	village
Haut-Martelange	Uewermaartel	Redange	Rambrouch	village
Heckenhaff	Heckenhaff	Esch/Alzette	Bettembourg	lieu-dit
Heffingen	Hiefenech	Mersch	Heffingen	village
Heiderscheid	Heischent	Wiltz	Esch-sur-Sûre	village
Heiderscheidergrund	Heischtergronn	Wiltz	Esch-sur-Sûre	village
Heiderscheidergrund (Goesdorf)	Heischtergronn	Wiltz	Esch-sur-Sûre	village
Heidscheuer	Heedscheier	Remich	Dalheim	lieu-dit
Heinenhaff	Heinenhaff	Diekirch	Ettelbruck	lieu-dit
Heinerscheid	Hengescht	Clervaux	Clervaux	village
Heisbich	Heeschbech	Echternach	Berdorf	lieu-dit
Heisburgerhaff / Heesberhaff	Heesberhaff	Remich	Bous	lieu-dit
Heisdorf	Heeschdref	Luxembourg	Steinsel	village
Heispelt	Heeschpelt	Redange	Wahl	village
Helfent (Bertrange)	Helfenter Bréck	Luxembourg	Bertrange	lieu-dit
Hellange	Helleng	Esch/Alzette	Frisange	village
Hellgewiss	Hellgewiss	Remich	Lenningen	lieu-dit
Helmdange	Hielem	Mersch	Lorentzweiler	village
Helmsange	Helsem	Luxembourg	Walferdange	village
Hemstal	Hemstel	Echternach	Bech	village
Herborn	Hierber	Echternach	Rosport-Mompach	village
Herborn-Moulin	Hierber Millen	Echternach	Rosport-Mompach	lieu-dit
Herdermillen	Herdermillen	Remich	Bous	lieu-dit
Hermeswiss	Hermeswiss	Diekirch	Reisdorf	lieu-dit
Herrenberg	Härebierg	Diekirch	Diekirch	lieu-dit
Hersberg	Heeschbreg	Echternach	Bech	village
Hesperange	Hesper	Luxembourg	Hesperange	village
Hessemillen	Hessemillen	Diekirch	Vallée de l'Ernz	lieu-dit
Hierheck	Hierheck	Wiltz	Esch-sur-Sûre	village
Hiestgriechterhof	Hiestgriechter Haff	Vianden	Tandel	lieu-dit
Hingerhaff	Hingerhaff	Mersch	Mersch	lieu-dit
Hinkel	Hénkel	Echternach	Rosport-Mompach	village
Hinterhassel	Hannerhasselt	Clervaux	Wincrange	village
Hirtzhaff (Feulen)	Hirtzhaff	Diekirch	Feulen	lieu-dit
Hirzenhaff (Bettendorf)	Hierzenhaff	Diekirch	Bettendorf	lieu-dit
Hivange	Héiweng	Capellen	Garnich	village
Hobscheid	Habscht	Capellen	Habscht	village
Hoesdorf	Héischdref	Diekirch	Reisdorf	village
Hof Ahl	Haff Ahl	Clervaux	Parc Hosingen	lieu-dit
Hoffelt	Houfelt	Clervaux	Wincrange	village
Hollenfels	Huelmes	Mersch	Helperknapp	village
Holler	Holler	Clervaux	Weiswampach	village
Hollerich (Luxembourg)	Hollerech	Luxembourg	Luxembourg	lieu-dit
Hollermühle	Hollermillen	Clervaux	Weiswampach	village
Holtz	Holz	Redange	Rambrouch	village
Holzem	Holzem	Capellen	Mamer	village
Holzthum	Holztem	Clervaux	Parc Hosingen	village
Hongeschhaff	Hongeschhaff	Echternach	Berdorf	lieu-dit
Honicht	Honicht	Clervaux	Parc Hosingen	lieu-dit
Horas (Préizerdaul)	Horas	Redange	Préizerdaul	lieu-dit
Horgershaff	Horgershaff	Wiltz	Goesdorf	lieu-dit
Hosbich	Hosbich	Mersch	Mersch	lieu-dit
Hoscheid	Houschent	Clervaux	Parc Hosingen	village
Hoscheid-Dickt	Houschter Déckt	Clervaux	Parc Hosingen	village
Hoscheidterhof	Houschter Haff	Vianden	Putscheid	village
Hosingen	Housen	Clervaux	Parc Hosingen	village
Hosingen-Barrière	Housener Barrière	Clervaux	Parc Hosingen	lieu-dit
Hossenberg	Hossebierg	Diekirch	Vallée de l'Ernz	lieu-dit
Hostert	Hueschtert	Redange	Rambrouch	village
Hostert	Hueschtert	Luxembourg	Niederanven	village
Hovelange	Huewel	Redange	Beckerich	village
Howald	Houwald	Luxembourg	Hesperange	village
Hubertushof	Haupeschhaff	Diekirch	Feulen	lieu-dit
Huettermuehle	Hëttermillen	Remich	Stadtbredimus	village
Huldange	Huldang	Clervaux	Troisvierges	village
Huldange-Forge	Schmëdd	Clervaux	Troisvierges	lieu-dit
Huldange-Moulin	Huldanger Millen	Clervaux	Troisvierges	lieu-dit
Huncherange	Hunchereng	Esch/Alzette	Bettembourg	village
Hunnebur	Hunnebuer	Mersch	Mersch	lieu-dit
Hunsdorf	Hënsdref	Mersch	Lorentzweiler	village
Hupperdange	Hëpperdang	Clervaux	Clervaux	village
Huttange	Hitten	Redange	Beckerich	village
Imbringen	Amber	Grevenmacher	Junglinster	village
Ingeldorf	Angelduerf	Diekirch	Erpeldange-sur-Sûre	village
Insenborn	Ënsber	Wiltz	Esch-sur-Sûre	village
Itzig	Izeg	Luxembourg	Hesperange	village
Itzigerste	Izeger Stee	Luxembourg	Hesperange	lieu-dit
Jaanshaff	Jaanshaff	Luxembourg	Walferdange	lieu-dit
Jäger (Maison-)	Jäger	Echternach	Bech	lieu-dit
Jakobsbierg	Jokesbierg	Echternach	Bech	lieu-dit
Jean-Haris	Jangharishaff	Grevenmacher	Junglinster	lieu-dit
Jemenerhaff	Gemener Haff	Echternach	Consdorf	lieu-dit
Jénkenhaff	Jénkenhaff	Redange	Ell	lieu-dit
Juckefeld	Juckefeld	Echternach	Consdorf	lieu-dit
Juegdschlass (Baambësch)	Juegdschlass	Luxembourg	Luxembourg	lieu-dit
Juegdschlass (Koerich)	Juegdschlass	Capellen	Koerich	lieu-dit
Junglinster	Jonglënster	Grevenmacher	Junglinster	village
Kaaspelterhof	Kaaspelt	Clervaux	Clervaux	village
Kackerterhaff	Kackerterhaff	Luxembourg	Contern	lieu-dit
Kaesfurt	Kéisfuert	Clervaux	Clervaux	village
Kaesfurt	Kéisfuert	Clervaux	Weiswampach	village
Kaffishaff	Kaffishaff	Remich	Lenningen	lieu-dit
Kahler	Koler	Capellen	Garnich	village
Kalborn	Kaalber	Clervaux	Clervaux	village
Kalborn-Moulin	Kaalber Millen	Clervaux	Clervaux	village
Kalchesbréck	Kalchesbréck	Luxembourg	Luxembourg	lieu-dit
Kalkesbach (Berdorf)	Kalkesbaach (Berdorf)	Echternach	Berdorf	village
Kalkesbach (Consdorf)	Kalkesbaach	Echternach	Berdorf	village
Kalscheier	Kalscheier	Capellen	Kopstal	lieu-dit
Kapenacker	Kapenaker	Grevenmacher	Wormeldange	village
Kapweiler	Kapweiler	Redange	Saeul	village
Käsfurt	Kéisfuert	Clervaux	Clervaux	lieu-dit
Käsfurt	Beler Käsfurt	Clervaux	Weiswampach	lieu-dit
Kaundorf	Kauneref	Wiltz	Lac de la Haute-Sûre	village
Kautenbach	Kautebaach	Wiltz	Kiischpelt	village
Kayl	Keel	Esch/Alzette	Kayl	village
Kehlen	Kielen	Capellen	Kehlen	village
Kehmen	Kiemen	Diekirch	Bourscheid	village
Kéiermillen	Kéiermillen	Clervaux	Parc Hosingen	lieu-dit
Keispelt	Keespelt	Capellen	Kehlen	village
Keiwelbach	Keiwelbaach	Diekirch	Vallée de l'Ernz	village
Kelleschhaff	Kelleschhaff	Echternach	Waldbillig	lieu-dit
Kemicht	Kéimicht	Clervaux	Wincrange	lieu-dit
Kempchen	Kempchen	Diekirch	Bettendorf	lieu-dit
Kempemillen	Kempemillen	Capellen	Habscht	lieu-dit
Kengert	Kéngert	Diekirch	Vallée de l'Ernz	lieu-dit
Kenseckehaff	Kënsecker Haff	Echternach	Bech	lieu-dit
Kiemerchen	Kiemerchen	Redange	Saeul	lieu-dit
Kiirchermillen	Kierchermillen	Clervaux	Troisvierges	lieu-dit
Kimm	Kimm	Redange	Rambrouch	lieu-dit
Kinnekshaff	Kinnikshaff	Redange	Wahl	lieu-dit
Kirchberg (Luxembourg)	Kierchbierg	Luxembourg	Luxembourg	lieu-dit
Kirchberg-Centre Européen	Kierchbierg	Luxembourg	Luxembourg	lieu-dit
Kirelshof	Kirelshaff	Clervaux	Clervaux	village
Kitzebur	Kitzebuer	Diekirch	Vallée de l'Ernz	lieu-dit
Klaus (Wolwelange)	Wolwener Klaus	Redange	Rambrouch	lieu-dit
Klaushaff (Septfontaines)	Klaushaff	Capellen	Habscht	lieu-dit
Kléck	Kléck	Diekirch	Diekirch	lieu-dit
Kleemühle	Kléimillen	Clervaux	Weiswampach	village
Kleinbettingen	Klengbetten	Capellen	Steinfort	village
Kleinhoscheid	Klenghouschent	Wiltz	Wiltz	lieu-dit
Klenge Buerghaff / Klengbuerghaff	Klenge Buerghaff	Mersch	Nommern	lieu-dit
Kléngelbur	Kléngelbuer	Capellen	Kopstal	lieu-dit
Klingelscheuer	Kléngelscheier	Mersch	Lorentzweiler	village
Klosmillen	Klosmillen	Grevenmacher	Biwer	lieu-dit
Knaphoscheid	Knapphouschent	Wiltz	Wiltz	village
Kobenbour	Kuebebuer	Echternach	Bech	village
Kockelscheuer	Kockelscheier	Luxembourg	Luxembourg	village
Koedange	Kéideng	Mersch	Fischbach	village
Koerich	Käerch	Capellen	Koerich	village
Koetschette	Kietscht	Redange	Rambrouch	village
Kohn	Kohn	Diekirch	Vallée de l'Ernz	lieu-dit
Konerhaff (Alscheid)	Konerhaff	Wiltz	Kiischpelt	lieu-dit
Këppenhaff	Këppenhaff	Vianden	Tandel	lieu-dit
Kopstal	Koplescht	Capellen	Kopstal	village
Kounenhaff (Obereisenbach)	Kounenhaff	Clervaux	Parc Hosingen	lieu-dit
Kraïzenheicht	Kräizenhéicht	Echternach	Bech	lieu-dit
Kräizhaff	Kräizhaff	Esch/Alzette	Roeser	lieu-dit
Krakelshaff (Bettembourg)	Krakelshaff	Esch/Alzette	Bettembourg	lieu-dit
Kranzenhaff	Kranzenhaff	Diekirch	Reisdorf	lieu-dit
Kreuzerbuch	Kräizerbuch	Capellen	Habscht	lieu-dit
Kroentgeshof	Kréintgeshaff	Luxembourg	Contern	lieu-dit
Krokelshaff (Aspelt)	Krokelshaff	Esch/Alzette	Frisange	lieu-dit
Kuborn	Kéiber	Redange	Wahl	village
Kuelbecherhaff	Kuelbecher Haff	Mersch	Helperknapp	village
Kultgeshaff	Kultgeshaff	Wiltz	Esch-sur-Sûre	lieu-dit
Lafewier	Lafewier	Echternach	Berdorf	lieu-dit
Lallange (Esch-sur-Alzette)	Lalleng	Esch/Alzette	Esch-sur-Alzette	lieu-dit
Lamadelaine	Rolleng	Esch/Alzette	Pétange	village
Lameschermillen (Bergem)	Lameschmillen	Esch/Alzette	Mondercange	lieu-dit
Lameschmillen (Wiltz)	Lameschmillen	Wiltz	Wiltz	lieu-dit
Landscheid	Laaschent	Vianden	Tandel	village
Lannen	Lannen	Redange	Redange/Attert	village
Lannenerbierg	Lannener Bierg	Redange	Redange/Attert	lieu-dit
Larochette	Fiels	Mersch	Larochette	village
Larochette - Château	Fielsser Schlass	Mersch	Larochette	lieu-dit
Lasauvage	Zowaasch	Esch/Alzette	Differdange	village
Lausdorn	Lausduer	Clervaux	Clervaux	village
Lausdorn	Lausduer	Clervaux	Clervaux	village
Lauterborn	Lauterbuer	Echternach	Echternach	lieu-dit
Leesbach	Léisbech	Capellen	Habscht	village
Legay	Legay	Clervaux	Wincrange	lieu-dit
Lehmkaul	Leemkaul	Clervaux	Parc Hosingen	lieu-dit
Lehrhof	Léierhaff	Redange	Grosbous	village
Leidenbach	Leedebach	Mersch	Larochette	lieu-dit
Leithum	Leetem	Clervaux	Weiswampach	village
Leitrange	Läitrenger Haff	Redange	Beckerich	lieu-dit
Lellig	Lelleg	Grevenmacher	Manternach	village
Lellingen	Lellgen	Wiltz	Kiischpelt	village
Lellingerhof	Lellerhaff	Mersch	Colmar-Berg	lieu-dit
Lenglerlach	Lenglerlach	Clervaux	Troisvierges	lieu-dit
Lenningen	Lenneng	Remich	Lenningen	village
Lentzweiler	Lenzweiler	Clervaux	Wincrange	village
Lëpschterhaff	Lëpschterhaff	Wiltz	Esch-sur-Sûre	lieu-dit
Léresmillen	Leeresmillen	Clervaux	Wincrange	lieu-dit
Les Rochers	Les Rochers	Grevenmacher	Manternach	lieu-dit
Leudelange	Leideleng	Esch/Alzette	Leudelange	village
Leudelange-Gare	Leidelenger Gare	Esch/Alzette	Leudelange	lieu-dit
Levelange	Liewel	Redange	Beckerich	village
Leymühle	Leemillen	Remich	Dalheim	lieu-dit
Liefrange	Léifreg	Wiltz	Lac de la Haute-Sûre	village
Lieler	Léiler	Clervaux	Clervaux	village
Lilien	Liljen	Echternach	Rosport-Mompach	village
Limpach	Lampech	Esch/Alzette	Reckange-sur-Mess	village
Limpertsberg (Luxembourg)	Lampertsbierg	Luxembourg	Luxembourg	lieu-dit
Linger	Lénger	Capellen	Käerjeng	village
Lintgen	Lëntgen	Mersch	Lintgen	village
Lipperscheid	Lëpschent	Diekirch	Bourscheid	village
Lipperscheid-Dellt	Lëpschter Dällt	Diekirch	Bourscheid	lieu-dit
Livange	Léiweng	Esch/Alzette	Roeser	village
Löftgermillen	Lëftgermillen	Capellen	Dippach	lieu-dit
Longsdorf	Longsdref	Vianden	Tandel	village
Lorentzscheuer (Ferme de)	Luerenzscheierhaff	Luxembourg	Bertrange	lieu-dit
Lorentzweiler	Luerenzweiler	Mersch	Lorentzweiler	village
Lullange	Lëllgen	Clervaux	Wincrange	village
Lultzhausen	Lëlz	Wiltz	Esch-sur-Sûre	village
Luxembourg	Lëtzebuerg	Luxembourg	Luxembourg	town (capital city)
Luxembourg-Gare	Gare	Luxembourg	Luxembourg	lieu-dit
Maarkebaach	Maarkebaach	Clervaux	Parc Hosingen	lieu-dit
Machtum	Meechtem	Grevenmacher	Wormeldange	village
Mamer	Mamer	Capellen	Mamer	village
Manertchen	Manertchen	Echternach	Echternach	lieu-dit
Manternach	Manternach	Grevenmacher	Manternach	village
Mariendallerhaff/Märjendallerhaff	Märjendaller Haff	Mersch	Helperknapp	lieu-dit
Marienthal	Mariendall	Mersch	Helperknapp	village
Marnach	Maarnech	Clervaux	Clervaux	village
Marscherwald	Marscherwald	Echternach	Consdorf	village
Martelinville	Rommeler Haff	Redange	Rambrouch	lieu-dit
Marxberg	Maarksbierg	Vianden	Tandel	lieu-dit
Marxeknupp	Marxeknupp	Luxembourg	Contern	lieu-dit
Marxmillen	Marxmillen	Grevenmacher	Biwer	lieu-dit
Masseler	Masseler	Wiltz	Goesdorf	village
Matgeshaff	Matgeshaff	Diekirch	Schieren	lieu-dit
Maulusmuehle	Maulesmillen	Clervaux	Wincrange	village
Maulusmühle	Maulesmillen	Clervaux	Weiswampach	village
Mecher	Mecher	Clervaux	Clervaux	village
Mecher	Meecher	Wiltz	Lac de la Haute-Sûre	village
Mecher (Kaundorf)	Meecher	Wiltz	Lac de la Haute-Sûre	lieu-dit
Medernach	Miedernach	Diekirch	Vallée de l'Ernz	village
Medingen	Méideng	Luxembourg	Contern	village
Meispelt	Meespelt	Capellen	Kehlen	village
Mélickshaff	Melickshaff	Echternach	Echternach	lieu-dit
Mensdorf	Mensder	Grevenmacher	Betzdorf	village
Merkholtz	Mäerkels	Wiltz	Kiischpelt	village
Merl (Luxembourg)	Märel	Luxembourg	Luxembourg	lieu-dit
Mersch	Miersch	Mersch	Mersch	village
Merscheid	Mëtscheed	Wiltz	Esch-sur-Sûre	village
Merscheid	Mierschent	Vianden	Putscheid	village
Mertert	Mäertert	Grevenmacher	Mertert	village
Mertzig	Mäerzeg	Diekirch	Mertzig	village
Mëtschenhaff	Mëtschenhaff	Diekirch	Bettendorf	lieu-dit
Meysembourg	Meesebuerg	Mersch	Larochette	village
Michelau	Méchela	Diekirch	Bourscheid	village
Michelbouch	Méchelbuch	Redange	Vichten	village
Michelsbierg	Méchelsbierg	Echternach	Rosport-Mompach	lieu-dit
Michelshof	Méchelshaff	Echternach	Consdorf	village
Ferme Misère	Misärshaff	Redange	Rambrouch	lieu-dit
Moersdorf	Méischdref	Echternach	Rosport-Mompach	village
Moesdorf	Miesdref	Mersch	Mersch	village
Moestroff	Méischtref	Diekirch	Bettendorf	village
Mompach	Mompech	Echternach	Rosport-Mompach	village
Mondercange	Monnerech	Esch/Alzette	Mondercange	village
Mondorf-les-Bains	Munneref	Remich	Mondorf-les-Bains	village
Mondorf-Route	Munnerëffer Strooss	Esch/Alzette	Roeser	lieu-dit
Mont Staint-Nicolas	Niklosbierg	Vianden	Vianden	lieu-dit
Moserhaff	Moserhaff	Diekirch	Vallée de l'Ernz	lieu-dit
Mouschbierg	Mouschbierg	Diekirch	Bettendorf	lieu-dit
Moutfort	Mutfert	Luxembourg	Contern	village
Mühlbach	Millbech	Luxembourg	Contern	lieu-dit
Mühlenbach (Luxembourg)	Millebaach	Luxembourg	Luxembourg	lieu-dit
Mullendorf	Mëlleref	Luxembourg	Steinsel	village
Mullerthal	Mëllerdall	Echternach	Waldbillig	village
Munsbach	Mënsbech	Luxembourg	Schuttrange	village
Munsbach - Château	Mënsbecher Schlass	Luxembourg	Schuttrange	lieu-dit
Münschecker	Mënjecker	Grevenmacher	Manternach	village
Munshausen	Munzen	Clervaux	Clervaux	village
Nachtmanderscheid	Nuechtmanescht	Vianden	Putscheid	village
Nagem	Nojem	Redange	Redange/Attert	village
Ferme de Nagem	Nojemer Haff	Redange	Redange/Attert	lieu-dit
Nagemerberg	Nojemer Bierg	Redange	Redange/Attert	lieu-dit
Neidhausen	Näidsen	Clervaux	Parc Hosingen	village
Neienshaff	Neienshaff	Diekirch	Vallée de l'Ernz	lieu-dit
Neihaff (Insenborn)	Neihaff	Wiltz	Esch-sur-Sûre	lieu-dit
Neihaff (Ingeldorf)	Neihaff	Diekirch	Erpeldange-sur-Sûre	lieu-dit
Neiluerenzscheierhaff	Neiluerenzscheierhaff	Luxembourg	Bertrange	lieu-dit
Neimillen (Echternach)	Neimillen	Echternach	Echternach	lieu-dit
Neimillen (Ermsdorf)	Neimillen	Diekirch	Vallée de l'Ernz	lieu-dit
Neimillen (Grosbous)	Neimillen	Redange	Grosbous	lieu-dit
Neimillen (Hoffelt)	Neimillen	Clervaux	Wincrange	lieu-dit
Neimillen (Koerich)	Neimillen	Capellen	Koerich	lieu-dit
Neimillen (Mamer)	Neimillen	Capellen	Mamer	lieu-dit
Neimillen (Schifflange)	Neimillen	Esch/Alzette	Schifflange	lieu-dit
Neirodeschhaff	Neirodeschhaff	Echternach	Consdorf	lieu-dit
Neudorf	Neiduerf	Luxembourg	Luxembourg	lieu-dit
Neuhaeusgen	Neihaischen	Luxembourg	Schuttrange	village
Neunhausen	Néngsen	Wiltz	Esch-sur-Sûre	village
Niederanven	Nidderaanwen	Luxembourg	Niederanven	village
Niederdonven	Nidderdonwen	Grevenmacher	Flaxweiler	village
Niederfeulen	Nidderfeelen	Diekirch	Feulen	village
Niederglabach	Nidderglabech	Mersch	Nommern	village
Niederkorn	Nidderkuer	Esch/Alzette	Differdange	village
Niederpallen	Nidderpallen	Redange	Redange/Attert	village
Niederpallen-Moulin	Nidderpallener Millen	Redange	Redange/Attert	lieu-dit
Niedert (Ferme de)	Nidderter Haff	Luxembourg	Bertrange	lieu-dit
Niederwampach	Nidderwampech	Clervaux	Wincrange	village
Niederwampach-Halte	Nidderwämper Halt	Clervaux	Wincrange	lieu-dit
Niederwiltz	Nidderwolz	Wiltz	Wiltz	lieu-dit
Niesenthal	Nisendaller Haff	Echternach	Waldbillig	village
Nocher	Nacher	Wiltz	Goesdorf	village
Nocher-Route	Nacher Strooss	Wiltz	Goesdorf	village
Noerdange	Näerden	Redange	Beckerich	village
Noertrange	Näertrech	Wiltz	Winseler	village
Noertzange	Näerzeng	Esch/Alzette	Bettembourg	village
Nommern	Noumer	Mersch	Nommern	village
Nospelt	Nouspelt	Capellen	Kehlen	village
Nothum	Noutem	Wiltz	Lac de la Haute-Sûre	village
Oberanven	Ueweraanwen	Luxembourg	Niederanven	village
Oberdonven	Uewerdonwen	Grevenmacher	Flaxweiler	village
Obereisenbach	Uewereesbech	Clervaux	Parc Hosingen	lieu-dit
Oberfeulen	Uewerfeelen	Diekirch	Feulen	village
Oberglabach	Uewerglabech	Mersch	Nommern	village
Oberkorn	Uewerkuer	Esch/Alzette	Differdange	village
Oberpallen	Uewerpallen	Redange	Beckerich	village
Oberschlinder	Iewescht Schlënner	Clervaux	Parc Hosingen	village
Oberwampach	Uewerwampech	Clervaux	Wincrange	village
Oenneschtmillen	Ënnescht Millen	Redange	Wahl	lieu-dit
Oetrange	Éiter	Luxembourg	Contern	village
Oetrange-Moulin	Éitermillen	Luxembourg	Contern	lieu-dit
Oligsmühle (Christnach)	Uelegsmillen	Echternach	Waldbillig	lieu-dit
Oligsmühle (Medernach)	Uelegsmillen	Diekirch	Vallée de l'Ernz	lieu-dit
Olingen	Ouljen	Grevenmacher	Betzdorf	village
Olm	Ollem	Capellen	Kehlen	village
Openthalt	Openthalt	Mersch	Helperknapp	village
Ospern	Osper	Redange	Redange/Attert	village
Osterbour (Larochette)	Ousterbuer	Diekirch	Vallée de l'Ernz	lieu-dit
Osterbour (Nagem)	Ousterbuer	Redange	Redange/Attert	lieu-dit
Osterholz	Ousterholz	Echternach	Consdorf	lieu-dit
Osweiler	Uesweller	Echternach	Rosport-Mompach	village
Pafebruch	Pafebruch	Capellen	Mamer	lieu-dit
Peckelshaff	Peckelshaff	Redange	Vichten	lieu-dit
Peppange	Peppeng	Esch/Alzette	Roeser	village
Perlé	Pärel	Redange	Rambrouch	village
Pétange	Péiteng	Esch/Alzette	Pétange	village
Petit-Nobressart	Kleng Elchert	Redange	Ell	village
Pettingen	Pëtten	Mersch	Mersch	village
Pfaffenberg	Pafebierg	Echternach	Rosport-Mompach	lieu-dit
Pfaffenthal (Luxembourg)	Pafendall	Luxembourg	Luxembourg	lieu-dit
Pintsch	Pënsch	Wiltz	Kiischpelt	village
Pissange	Piisseng	Esch/Alzette	Reckange-sur-Mess	village
Plankenhaff	Plankenhaff	Mersch	Lintgen	lieu-dit
Platen	Platen	Redange	Préizerdaul	village
Pleitrange	Pläitreng	Luxembourg	Contern	lieu-dit
Pletschette	Pletschette	Diekirch	Vallée de l'Ernz	lieu-dit
Pommerloch	Pommerlach	Wiltz	Winseler	village
Pontpierre	Steebrécken	Esch/Alzette	Mondercange	village
Poschend	Poschend	Clervaux	Parc Hosingen	lieu-dit
Posselt	Posselt	Echternach	Berdorf	lieu-dit
Potaschberg	Potaschbierg	Grevenmacher	Grevenmacher	lieu-dit
Pratz	Proz	Redange	Préizerdaul	village
PREIZERDAUL (Commune de)		Redange/Attert	Préizerdaul	lieu-dit
Prétemerhaff	Pretemer Haff	Esch/Alzette	Reckange-sur-Mess	lieu-dit
Prettingen	Pretten	Mersch	Lintgen	village
Pull	Poul	Vianden	Putscheid	lieu-dit
Pulvermühl (Luxembourg)	Polvermillen	Luxembourg	Luxembourg	lieu-dit
Putscheid	Pëtschent	Vianden	Putscheid	village
Quatre-Vents (Eschdorf)	Katrewang	Wiltz	Esch-sur-Sûre	lieu-dit
Quatre-Vents (Kehlen)	Katrewang	Capellen	Kehlen	lieu-dit
Rambrouch	Rammerech	Redange	Rambrouch	village
Rameldange	Rammeldang	Luxembourg	Niederanven	village
Rashaff		Mersch	Lorentzweiler	lieu-dit
Reckange	Recken	Mersch	Mersch	village
Reckange-Barrière	Reckener Barrière	Mersch	Mersch	lieu-dit
Reckange-sur-Mess	Reckeng op der Mess	Esch/Alzette	Reckange-sur-Mess	village
Reckenthal	Reckendall	Luxembourg	Strassen	lieu-dit
Reckingerhof	Reckingerhaff	Remich	Dalheim	village
Redange/Attert	Réiden op der Atert	Redange	Redange/Attert	village
Redingshaff	Réidingshaff	Redange/Attert	Wahl	lieu-dit
Reichlange	Räichel	Redange/Attert	Redange/Attert	village
Reifeschbierg	Reifeschbierg	Mersch	Mersch	lieu-dit
Reimberg	Rëmerech	Redange/Attert	Préizerdaul	village
Reineschhaff	Reineschhaff	Diekirch	Vallée de l'Ernz	lieu-dit
Reisdorf	Reisduerf	Diekirch	Reisdorf	village
Reisermillen	Reisermillen	Diekirch	Vallée de l'Ernz	lieu-dit
Remerschen	Rëmerschen	Remich	Schengen	village
Remich	Réimech	Remich	Remich	town
Reuland	Reiland	Mersch	Heffingen	village
Reuland-Moulin	Reilander Millen	Mersch	Heffingen	lieu-dit
Reuler	Reiler	Clervaux	Clervaux	village
Riesenhof	Riesenhaff	Redange	Rambrouch	village
Rindschleiden	Randschelt	Redange	Wahl	village
Ringbaach	Ringbaach	Redange	Wahl	lieu-dit
Ringel	Réngel	Wiltz	Esch-sur-Sûre	village
Ringel (Ferme de)	Réngeler Haff	Wiltz	Esch-sur-Sûre	lieu-dit
Rippig	Rippeg	Echternach	Bech	village
Rippweiler	Rippweiler	Redange	Useldange	village
Rodange	Rodange	Esch/Alzette	Pétange	village
Rodenbourg	Roudemer	Grevenmacher	Junglinster	village
Roder	Rueder	Clervaux	Clervaux	village
Rodershausen	Rouderssen	Clervaux	Parc Hosingen	village
Roedgen	Riedgen	Esch/Alzette	Reckange-sur-Mess	village
Roedt	Réid	Remich	Waldbredimus	village
Roeser	Réiser	Esch/Alzette	Roeser	village
Rolling	Rolleng	Remich	Bous	village
Rollingen	Rolleng	Mersch	Mersch	village
Rollingergrund (Luxembourg)	Rollengergronn	Luxembourg	Luxembourg	lieu-dit
Rombach-Martelange	Roumecht	Redange	Rambrouch	village
Ronnebësch	Ronnebësch	Vianden	Tandel	lieu-dit
Roodt (Ell)	Rued	Redange	Ell	village
Roodt/Eisch	Rued	Capellen	Habscht	village
Roodt-sur-Syre	Rued-Sir	Grevenmacher	Betzdorf	village
Roost (Bissen)	Rouscht	Mersch	Bissen	village
Rosport	Rouspert	Echternach	Rosport-Mompach	village
Rossmühle	Rossmillen	Clervaux	Weiswampach	village
Rosswinkelerhaff	Rosswénkeler Haff	Echternach	Consdorf	lieu-dit
Roudbaach	Routbaach	Redange	Préizerdaul	lieu-dit
Roudenhaff (Bridel)	Roudenhaff	Capellen	Kopstal	lieu-dit
Roudenhaff (Echternach)	Roudenhaff	Echternach	Echternach	lieu-dit
Roullingen	Rulljen	Wiltz	Wiltz	village
Rouschthaff	Rouschthaff	Mersch	Mersch	lieu-dit
Rumelange	Rëmeleng	Esch/Alzette	Rumelange	town
Rumlange	Rëmeljen	Clervaux	Wincrange	village
Saeul	Sëll	Redange	Saeul	village
Sandweiler	Sandweiler	Luxembourg	Sandweiler	village
Sandweiler-Contern Gare	Sandweiler Gare	Luxembourg	Hesperange	lieu-dit
Sanem	Suessem	Esch/Alzette	Sanem	village
Sassel	Saassel	Clervaux	Wincrange	village
Savelborn	Suewelbuer	Diekirch	Vallée de l'Ernz	village
Savelborn (Waldbillig)	Suewelbuer	Echternach	Waldbillig	village
Schack	Schack	Capellen	Käerjeng	lieu-dit
Schäferrieder	Schäferrieder	Grevenmacher	Mertert	lieu-dit
Schandel	Schandel	Redange	Useldange	village
Scheedbierg	Scheedbierg	Grevenmacher	Mertert	lieu-dit
Scheedhaff	Scheedhaff	Luxembourg	Luxembourg	lieu-dit
Scheedheck	Scheedheck	Diekirch	Reisdorf	lieu-dit
Scheidel	Scheedel	Diekirch	Bourscheid	village
Scheidgen	Scheedgen	Echternach	Consdorf	village
Scheierhaff (Belvaux)	Scheierhaff	Esch/Alzette	Sanem	lieu-dit
Scheierhaff (Canach)	Scheierhaff	Remich	Lenningen	lieu-dit
Scheierhaff (Moesdorf)	Scheierhaff	Mersch	Mersch	lieu-dit
Scheierhaff (Vianden)	Scheierhaff	Vianden	Vianden	lieu-dit
Schéiferei	Schéiferei	Mersch	Mersch	lieu-dit
Schengen	Schengen	Remich	Schengen	village
Scherbach	Schierbaach	Mersch	Heffingen	village
Scherfenhaff	Schierfenhaff	Mersch	Heffingen	lieu-dit
Scheuerberg	Scheierbierg	Remich	Bous	lieu-dit
Schieren	Schieren	Diekirch	Schieren	village
Schieren (Ferme de)	Schierener Haff	Diekirch	Schieren	lieu-dit
Schieren-Moulin	Schierener Millen	Diekirch	Schieren	lieu-dit
Schifflange	Schëffleng	Esch/Alzette	Schifflange	village
Schiltzberg	Schiltzbierg	Mersch	Fischbach	village
Schimpach	Schëmpech	Clervaux	Wincrange	village
Schlammesté / Schlammestee	Schlammestee	Luxembourg	Weiler-la-Tour	lieu-dit
Schleederhaff	Schleederhaff	Mersch	Nommern	lieu-dit
Schleif	Schleef	Wiltz	Winseler	village
Schleifmillen (Altlinster)	Schläifmillen	Grevenmacher	Junglinster	lieu-dit
Schleifmühle (Luxembourg)	Schläifmillen	Luxembourg	Luxembourg	lieu-dit
Schleiterhaff	Schläiterhaff	Echternach	Berdorf	lieu-dit
Schléiwenhaff	Schléiwenhaff	Esch/Alzette	Leudelange	lieu-dit
Schlindermanderscheid	Schlënnermanescht	Diekirch	Bourscheid	village
Schmëttewier	Schmëttewier	Echternach	Beaufort	lieu-dit
Schmuelen	Schmuelen	Vianden	Putscheid	lieu-dit
Schockmillen	Schockmillen	Capellen	Käerjeng	lieu-dit
Schoenfels	Schëndels	Mersch	Mersch	village
Schoenfels-Moulin	Schëndelsser Millen	Mersch	Mersch	lieu-dit
Schoos	Schous	Mersch	Fischbach	village
Schorenshaff	Schorenshaff	Grevenmacher	Manternach	lieu-dit
Schouweiler	Schuller	Capellen	Dippach	village
Schrassig	Schraasseg	Luxembourg	Schuttrange	village
Schrassig-Kuelebierg	Schraasseger Kuelebierg	Luxembourg	Schuttrange	lieu-dit
Schroedeschhaff	Schréideschhaff	Diekirch	Bettendorf	lieu-dit
Schrondweiler	Schrondweiler	Mersch	Nommern	village
Schumannseck	Schumannseck	Wiltz	Lac de la Haute-Sûre	lieu-dit
Schummeschmillen	Schummeschmillen	Redange	Redange/Attert	lieu-dit
Schüttburg-Château	Schibbreger Schlass	Wiltz	Kiischpelt	lieu-dit
Schüttburg-Moulin	Schibbreger Millen	Wiltz	Kiischpelt	lieu-dit
Schuttrange	Schëtter	Luxembourg	Schuttrange	village
Schwaarzenhaff	Schwaarzenhaff	Capellen	Steinfort	lieu-dit
Schwanenthal	Schwunnendall	Mersch	Lintgen	lieu-dit
Schwanterhaff	Schwanterhaff	Diekirch	Vallée de l'Ernz	lieu-dit
Schwebach	Schweebech	Redange	Saeul	village
Schwebach Pont	Schweebecher Bréck	Redange	Saeul	lieu-dit
Schwebsingen	Schwéidsbeng	Remich	Schengen	village
Schweich	Schweech	Redange	Beckerich	village
Schwiedelbrouch	Schwiddelbruch	Redange	Rambrouch	village
Seitert	Saitert	Echternach	Berdorf	lieu-dit
Selscheid	Selschent	Wiltz	Wiltz	village
Seltz	Selz	Vianden	Tandel	village
Senningen	Senneng	Luxembourg	Niederanven	village
Senningerberg	Sennengerbierg	Luxembourg	Niederanven	village
Septfontaines	Simmer	Capellen	Habscht	village
Septfontaines (Luxembourg)	Siwebueren	Luxembourg	Luxembourg	lieu-dit
Seylerhaff	Seelerhaff	Mersch	Nommern	lieu-dit
Siebenaler	Siwwenaler	Clervaux	Clervaux	village
Simmerfarm	Simmerfarm	Capellen	Habscht	village
Simmerschmelz	Simmerschmelz	Capellen	Habscht	village
Siwemuergen	Siwemuergen	Luxembourg	Luxembourg	lieu-dit
Sliepenhaff	Sliepenhaff	Wiltz	Wiltz	lieu-dit
Soleuvre	Zolwer	Esch/Alzette	Sanem	village
Sonlez	Soller	Wiltz	Winseler	village
Soup (Heffingen)	Supp	Mersch	Heffingen	lieu-dit
Soup (Reisdorf)	Supp	Diekirch	Reisdorf	lieu-dit
Specksmillen	Specksmillen	Echternach	Echternach	lieu-dit
Sprinkange	Sprénkeng	Capellen	Dippach	village
Stadtbredimus	Stadbriedemes	Remich	Stadtbredimus	village
Staffelstein	Stafelter	Luxembourg	Niederanven	village
Stegen	Steeën	Diekirch	Vallée de l'Ernz	village
Steinfort	Stengefort	Capellen	Steinfort	village
Steinheim	Steenem	Echternach	Rosport-Mompach	village
Steinsel	Steesel	Luxembourg	Steinsel	village
Stockem	Stackem	Clervaux	Wincrange	village
Stolzembourg	Stolzebuerg	Vianden	Putscheid	village
Stoppelhaff	Stoppelhaff	Echternach	Consdorf	lieu-dit
Strassen	Stroossen	Luxembourg	Strassen	village
Stuppicht	Stuppecht	Mersch	Fischbach	village
Surré	Sir	Wiltz	Boulaide	village
Syrdall	Sirdall	Grevenmacher	Biwer	lieu-dit
Syrdallschlass	Sirdallschlass	Grevenmacher	Manternach	lieu-dit
Syren	Siren	Luxembourg	Weiler-la-Tour	village
Tadler	Toodler	Wiltz	Esch-sur-Sûre	village
Tadler-Moulin	Toodlermillen	Wiltz	Esch-sur-Sûre	lieu-dit
Tandel	Tandel	Vianden	Tandel	village
Tarchamps	Eeschpelt	Wiltz	Lac de la Haute-Sûre	village
Tétange	Téiteng	Esch/Alzette	Kayl	village
Theinshaff	Theinshaff	Echternach	Consdorf	lieu-dit
Thillsmillen	Thillsmillen	Capellen	Mamer	lieu-dit
Tintesmühle	Tëntesmillen	Clervaux	Clervaux	village
Tomm (Bastendorf)	Tomm	Vianden	Tandel	lieu-dit
Tomm (Fouhren)	Tomm	Vianden	Tandel	lieu-dit
Tossebierg	Tossebierg	Luxembourg	Bertrange	lieu-dit
Toussaintsmillen	Toussaintsmillen	Esch/Alzette	Kayl	lieu-dit
Trintange	Trënteng	Remich	Waldbredimus	village
Troine	Tratten	Clervaux	Wincrange	village
Troine-Route	Trätter Strooss	Clervaux	Wincrange	village
Troisvierges	Ëlwen	Clervaux	Troisvierges	village
Trudlermillen	Trudlermillen	Luxembourg	Weiler-la-Tour	lieu-dit
Tschiddeschmillen	Tschiddeschmillen	Diekirch	Bettendorf	lieu-dit
Tuntange	Tënten	Mersch	Helperknapp	village
Turelbaach	Turelbaach	Redange	Grosbous	lieu-dit
Tutschemillen	Tutschemillen	Wiltz	Wiltz	lieu-dit
Uebersyren	Iwwersiren	Luxembourg	Schuttrange	village
Untereisenbach	Eesbech	Clervaux	Parc Hosingen	lieu-dit
Unterschlinder	Ënnerschlënner	Clervaux	Parc Hosingen	village
Urspelt	Ischpelt	Clervaux	Clervaux	village
Useldange	Useldeng	Redange	Useldange	village
Verlorenkost (Luxembourg)	Verluerekascht	Luxembourg	Luxembourg	lieu-dit
Vesquenhaff	Vesquenhaff	Esch/Alzette	Differdange	lieu-dit
Vianden	Veianen	Vianden	Vianden	town
Vichten	Viichten	Redange	Vichten	village
Wahl	Wal	Redange	Wahl	village
Wahlhausen	Wuelessen	Clervaux	Parc Hosingen	village
Wahlhausen Dickt	Wuelesser Déckt	Clervaux	Parc Hosingen	lieu-dit
Waldbierg	Waldberg	Clervaux	Parc Hosingen	lieu-dit
Waldbillig	Waldbëlleg	Echternach	Waldbillig	village
Waldbredimus	Waldbriedemes	Remich	Waldbredimus	village
Waldhof	Waldhaff	Luxembourg	Niederanven	village
Walferdange	Walfer	Luxembourg	Walferdange	village
Wallendorf-Pont	Wallenduerfer Bréck	Diekirch	Reisdorf	village
Walsdorf	Waalsdref	Vianden	Tandel	village
Warken	Waarken	Diekirch	Ettelbruck	village
Wasserbillig	Waasserbëlleg	Grevenmacher	Mertert	village
Watrange	Walter	Wiltz	Lac de la Haute-Sûre	village
Watschenterhaff	Watschenterhaff	Diekirch	Vallée de l'Ernz	lieu-dit
Wealerhaff	Wealerhaff	Wiltz	Esch-sur-Sûre	lieu-dit
Webeschhaff	Webeschhaff	Diekirch	Bettendorf	lieu-dit
Wecker	Wecker	Grevenmacher	Biwer	village
Wecker-Gare	Wecker Gare	Grevenmacher	Biwer	village
Weicherdange	Wäicherdang	Clervaux	Clervaux	village
Weidemillen	Weidemillen	Remich	Schengen	lieu-dit
Weidendall / Val des Oseraies	Weidendall	Capellen	Kehlen	lieu-dit
Weidingen	Wegdichen	Wiltz	Wiltz	village
Weiler	Weiler	Clervaux	Wincrange	village
Weiler	Weller	Vianden	Putscheid	village
Weilerbach	Weilerbaach	Echternach	Berdorf	village
Weiler-la-Tour	Weiler zum Tuer	Luxembourg	Weiler-la-Tour	village
Weimershof (Luxembourg)	Weimeschhaff	Luxembourg	Luxembourg	lieu-dit
Weimerskirch (Luxembourg)	Weimeschkierch	Luxembourg	Luxembourg	lieu-dit
Weissenhaff	Wäissenhaff	Redange	Rambrouch	lieu-dit
Weiswampach	Wäiswampech	Clervaux	Weiswampach	village
Welfrange	Welfreng	Remich	Dalheim	village
Wellenstein	Welleschten	Remich	Schengen	village
Welscheid	Welschent	Diekirch	Bourscheid	village
Welsdorf	Welsdref	Mersch	Colmar-Berg	village
Wemperhardt	Wemperhaart	Clervaux	Weiswampach	village
Weydert (la Ferme)	Weyderter Haff	Mersch	Larochette	lieu-dit
Weydig	Weydeg	Grevenmacher	Biwer	village
Weyer	Weyer	Mersch	Fischbach	village
Wickrange	Wickreng	Esch/Alzette	Reckange-sur-Mess	village
Wilspull	Wilspull	Diekirch	Bourscheid	lieu-dit
Wiltgeshaff	Wiltgeshaff	Redange	Vichten	lieu-dit
Wiltz	Wolz	Wiltz	Wiltz	town
Wilwerdange	Wilwerdang	Clervaux	Troisvierges	village
Wilwerwiltz	Wëlwerwolz	Wiltz	Kiischpelt	village
Wincrange	Wëntger	Clervaux	Wincrange	village
Windhof (Koerich)	Wandhaff	Capellen	Koerich	village
Windhof (Welscheid)	Wandhaff	Diekirch	Bourscheid	lieu-dit
Winseler	Wanseler	Wiltz	Winseler	village
Wintrange	Wëntreng	Remich	Schengen	village
Wirtgensmühle	Wirtgensmillen	Clervaux	Clervaux	village
Wollefsmillen	Wollefsmillen	Grevenmacher	Mertert	lieu-dit
Wolper	Wuelper	Echternach	Consdorf	village
Wolwelange	Wolwen	Redange	Rambrouch	village
Wormeldange	Wuermer	Grevenmacher	Wormeldange	village
Wormeldange-Haut	Wuermer Bierg	Grevenmacher	Wormeldange	village
Zittig	Zëtteg	Echternach	Bech	village

== See also ==
- List of cities in Luxembourg
- Outline of Luxembourg
