= Calmus =

Calmus or CALMUS may refer to:

- Calmus, Saeul, Luxembourg
- Călmuș River, tributary of the river Tazlăul Sărat in Romania
- Dick Calmus (born 1944), American baseball player
- Rocky Calmus (born 1979), American footballer
- CALMUS, composing software created by Icelandic composer Kjartan Ólafsson
- Calmus, Leipzig vocal quintet founded by Martin Lattke 1999

== See also ==
- Calamus (disambiguation)
