= Weiler =

Weiler (German for a hamlet or a tiny village) may refer to:

== Places ==
- Weiler, Austria, a town in Vorarlberg in Austria
- Villerupt, France (in German and Luxembourgish: Weiler), a town in France
- in Germany
  - Weiler, Cochem-Zell, in the district Cochem-Zell, Rhineland-Palatinate
  - Weiler, Mayen-Koblenz, in the district Mayen-Koblenz, Rhineland-Palatinate
  - Weiler bei Bingen, in the district Mainz-Bingen, Rhineland-Palatinate
  - Weiler bei Monzingen, in the district of Bad Kreuznach, Rhineland-Palatinate
  - Weiler (Rottenburg), a suburb of Rottenburg am Neckar in the district of Tübingen, Baden-Württemberg
  - Weiler-Simmerberg, a town in Lindau district, Bavaria; incorporates the former town Weiler im Allgäu
  - Dudweiler, part of Saarbrücken
- in Luxembourg
  - Weiler, Putscheid, a village in the commune of Putscheid
  - Weiler, Wincrange, a village in the commune of Wincrange
  - Weiler-la-Tour, a town and commune in the canton of Luxembourg

== People ==
- Albert Weiler (born 1965), German politician
- Barbara Weiler (born 1946), German politician
- Dirk Weiler, German musical theatre actor living in the United States
- Jack D. Weiler (1904–1995), American real estate developer and philanthropist
- Joseph H. H. Weiler (born 1951), professor at New York University Law School
- Lance Weiler, American film-maker and writer
- Lucien Weiler (1951–2026), Luxembourgian politician and jurist
- Max Weiler (1900–1969), Swiss footballer
- Moses Cyrus Weiler (1907–2000), Latvian-born South African rabbi
- Paul C. Weiler (1939–2021), Harvard law professor and supporter of non obstante clause in Canada's constitution
- Raoul Weiler (1938–2019), President of the EU-Chapter of The Club of Rome
- René Weiler (born 1973), Swiss footballer
- Sepp Weiler (1921–1997), German ski jumper
- Sophie von Weiler (born 1958), Dutch field hockey forward in the olympics
- Wayne Weiler (1934–2005), American racecar driver

== See also ==
- Wyler (disambiguation)
- Wheeler (disambiguation)
