= Wyler =

Wyler may refer to:

== People ==
- Allen Wyler, neurosurgeon and author
- Bea Wyler (born 1951), second female rabbi in Germany
- Greg Wyler (born 1969), American tech entrepreneur, engineer, and inventor
- Gretchen Wyler (1932–2007), American actress
- Lia Wyler (1934–2018), Brazilian translator
- Maud Wyler (born 1982), French actress
- Rich Wyler, stage name of Richard Stapley
- Robert Wyler (1900–1971), American film producer
- William Wyler (1902–1981), film director

== Places ==
- Wyler, North Rhine-Westphalia, a village along the Dutch/German border

== Other ==
- Wyler's, a brand name for soups and bouillon
- Wyler, a character in the Art of Fighting series
- Wyler Racing, a NASCAR Craftsman Truck Series team
- Wyler (company), a Swiss watch manufacturer
- Wyler Aerial Tramway, an aerial tramway in El Paso, Texas, United States

== See also ==
- Weiler (disambiguation)
