= Seltz (Tandel) =

Village in Luxembourg

Coordinates: 49°52′48″N 6°11′21″E

Seltz Selz/Sëlz
- Village
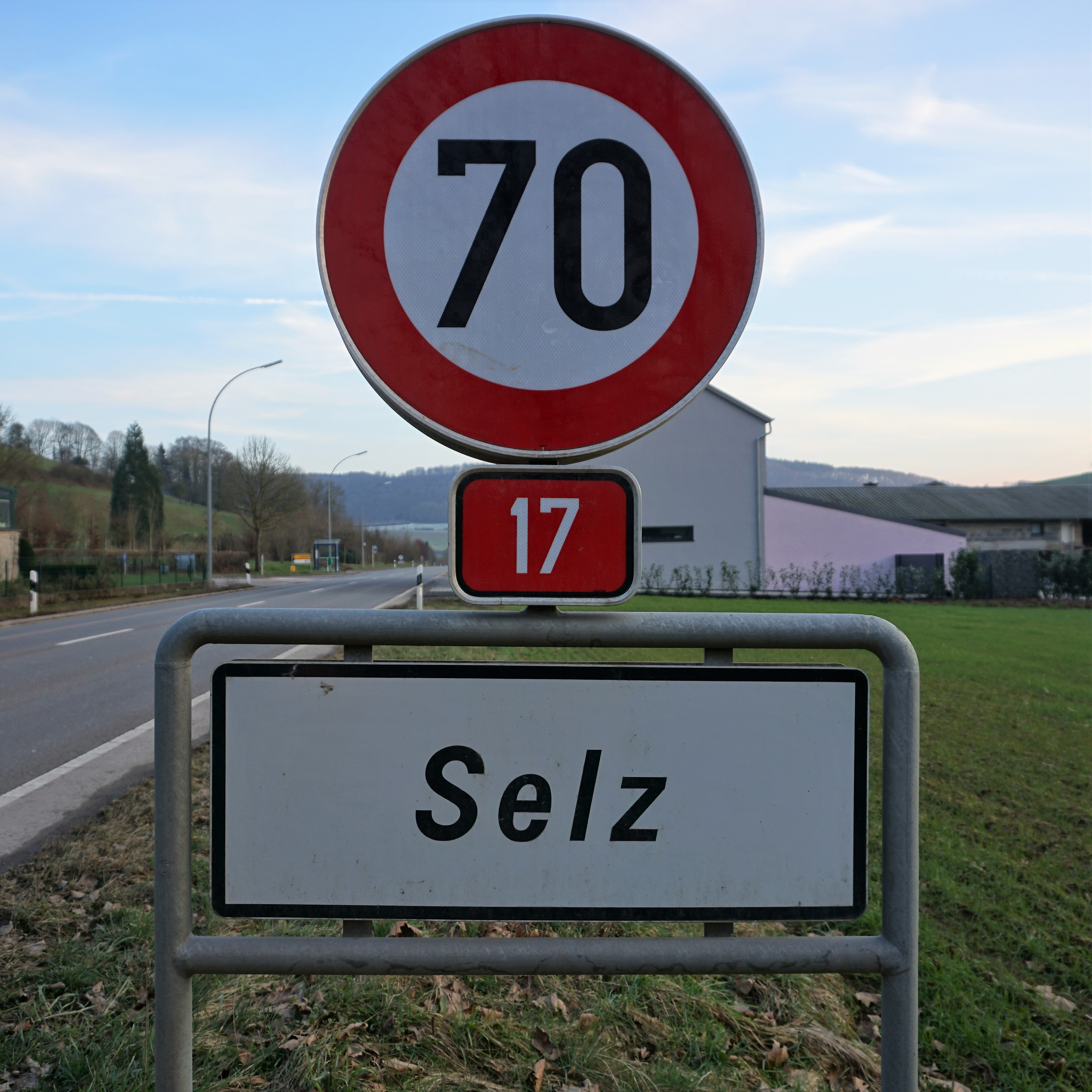
- Interactive map of Seltz
- Country: Luxembourg
- Canton: Vianden
- Commune: Tandel

Population
  - Total: 108
- Time zone: UTC+1 (CET)
  - Summer (DST): UTC+2 (CEST)

Seltz (German pronunciation: [ˈzɛlts]; Luxembourgish: Selz or Sëlz) is a village in northeastern Luxembourg.

It is situated in the commune of Tandel and has a population of 110 as of September 2026.
