= Eltz (Redange) =

Village in Luxembourg

Coordinates: 49°46′41″N 5°53′38″E

Eltz Elz
- Village
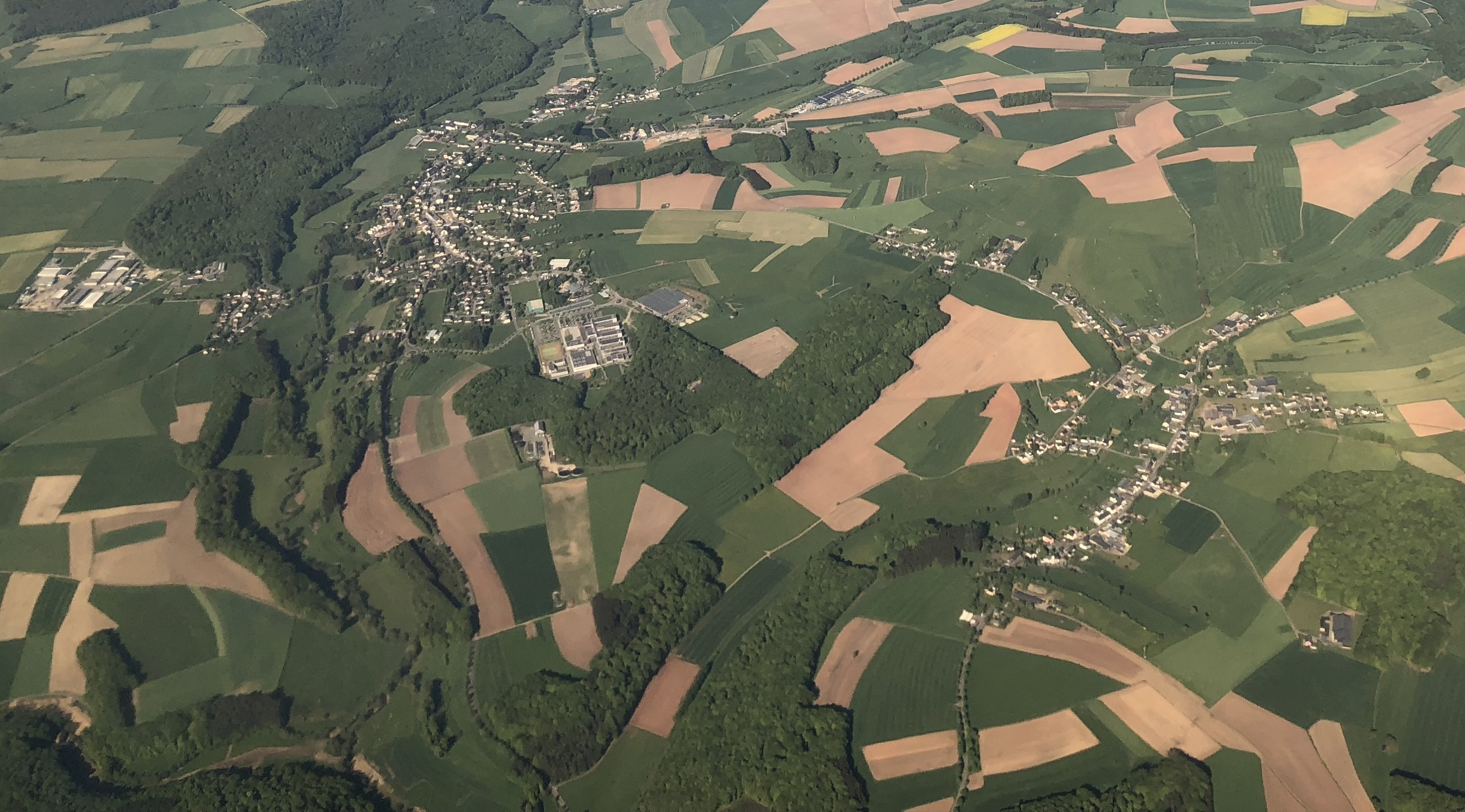
- Aerial view of Redange, Eltz and Ospern
- Interactive map of Eltz
- Country: Luxembourg
- Canton: Redange
- Commune: Redange-sur-Attert

Population
  - Total: 55
- Time zone: UTC+1 (CET)
  - Summer (DST): UTC+2 (CEST)

Eltz (Luxembourgish: Elz) is a village in northwestern Luxembourg.

It is situated in the commune of Redange-sur-Attert and has a population of 52 as of 2026.
