= Schwebach =

Village in Luxembourg

Coordinates: 49°44′45″N 5°58′16″E

Schwebach Schweebech
- Village
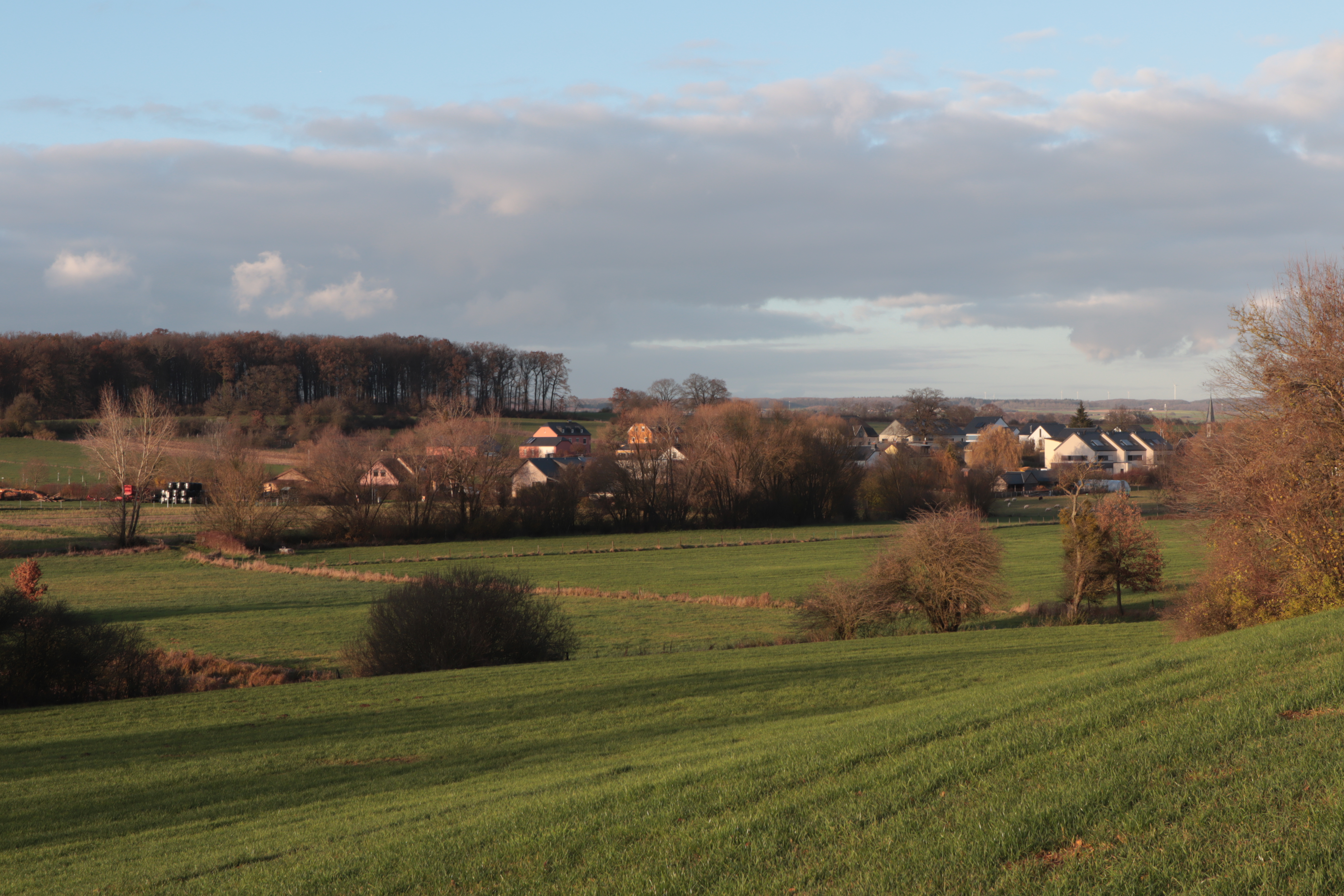
- View over Schwebach
- Interactive map of Schwebach
- Country: Luxembourg
- Canton: Redange
- Commune: Saeul

Population
  - Total: 227
- Time zone: UTC+1 (CET)
  - Summer (DST): UTC+2 (CEST)

Schwebach (German pronunciation: [ˈʃveːbax]; Luxembourgish: Schweebech) is a village in northwestern Luxembourg.

It is situated in the commune of Saeul and has a population of 227 as of September 2026.

== Gallery ==
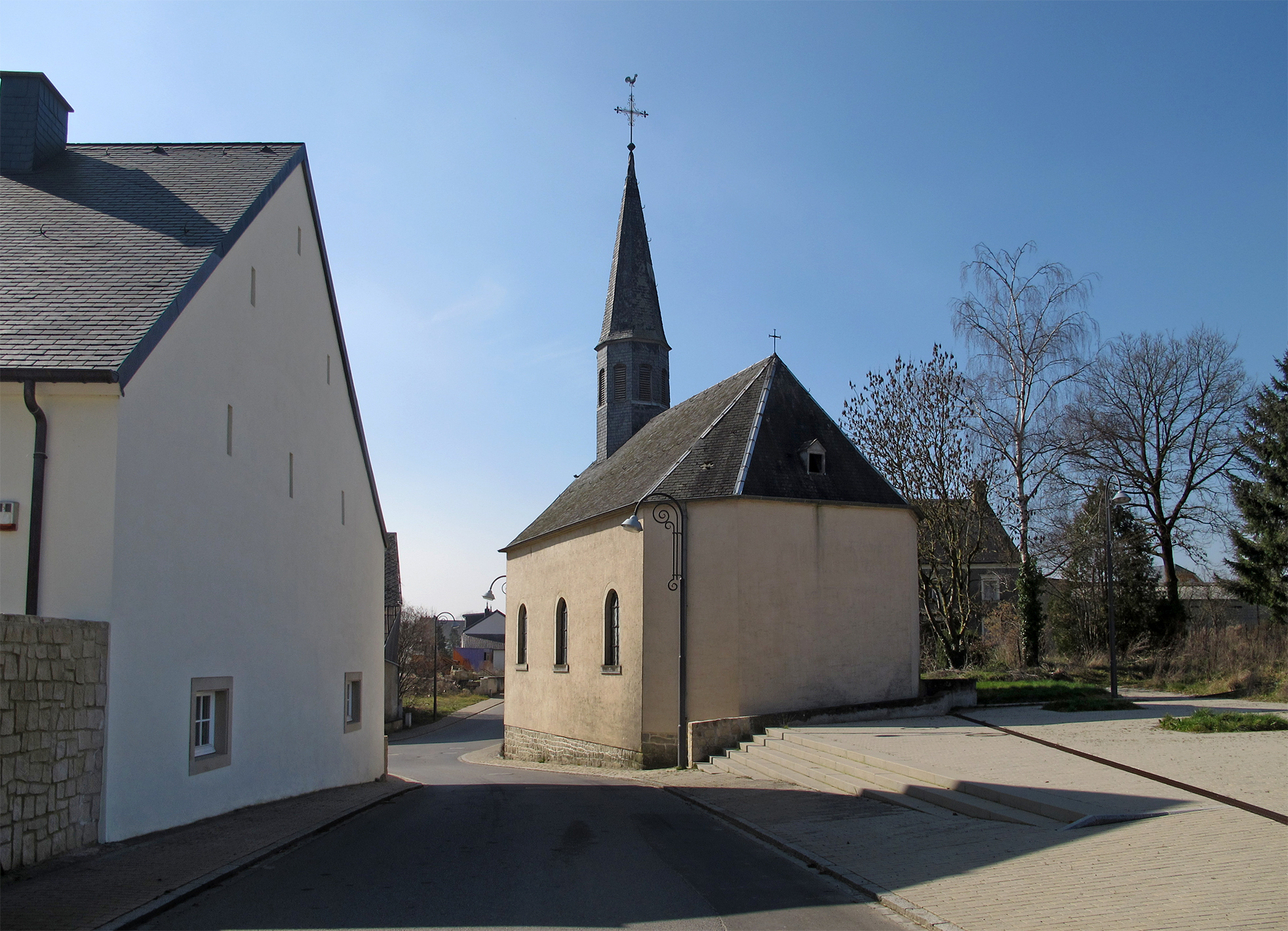
Chapel in Schwebach

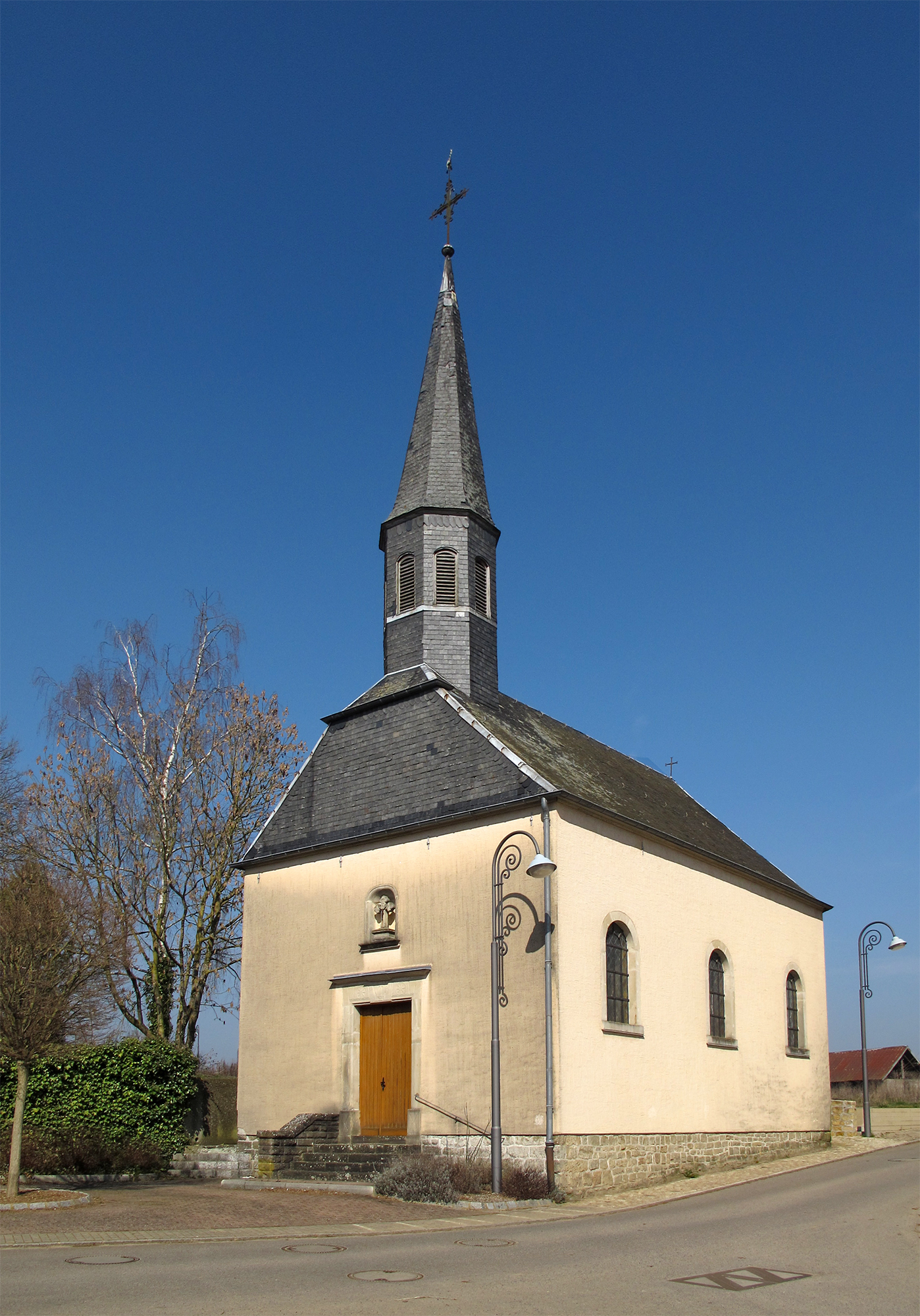
