= Merscheid (Putscheid) =

Village in Luxembourg

Coordinates: 49°57′15″N 6°06′19″E

Merscheid Mierschent
- Village
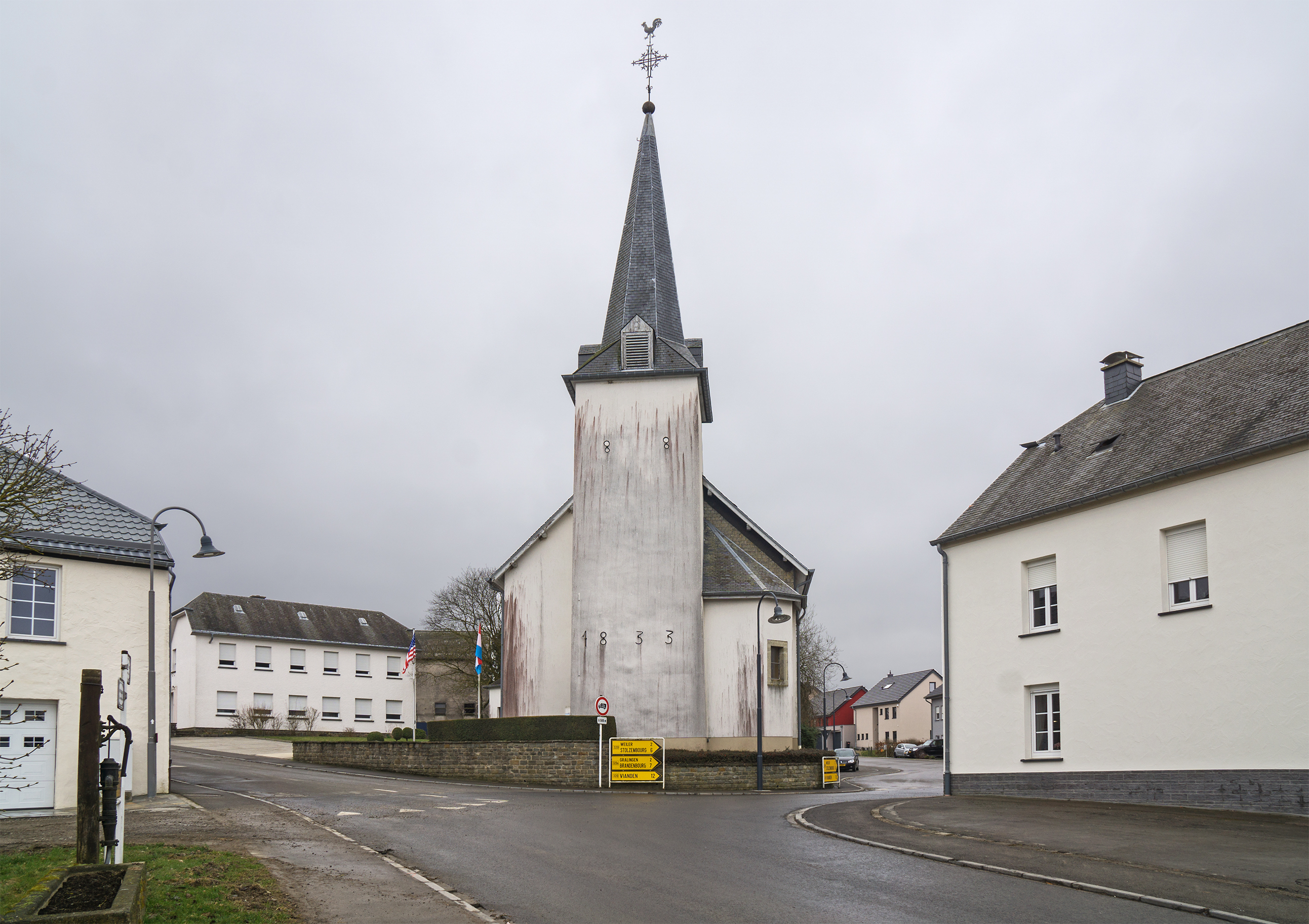
- Church of Merscheid in the centre of the village
- Interactive map of Merscheid
- Country: Luxembourg
- Canton: Vianden
- Commune: Putscheid

Population
  - Total: 224
- Time zone: UTC+1 (CET)
  - Summer (DST): UTC+2 (CEST)

Merscheid (Luxembourgish: Mierschent) is a village in northeastern Luxembourg.

It is situated in the commune of Putscheid and has a population of 237 as of September 2026.
