= Ehner =

Village in Luxembourg

Coordinates: 49°43′03″N 5°57′03″E

Ehner Éiner/Iener
- Village
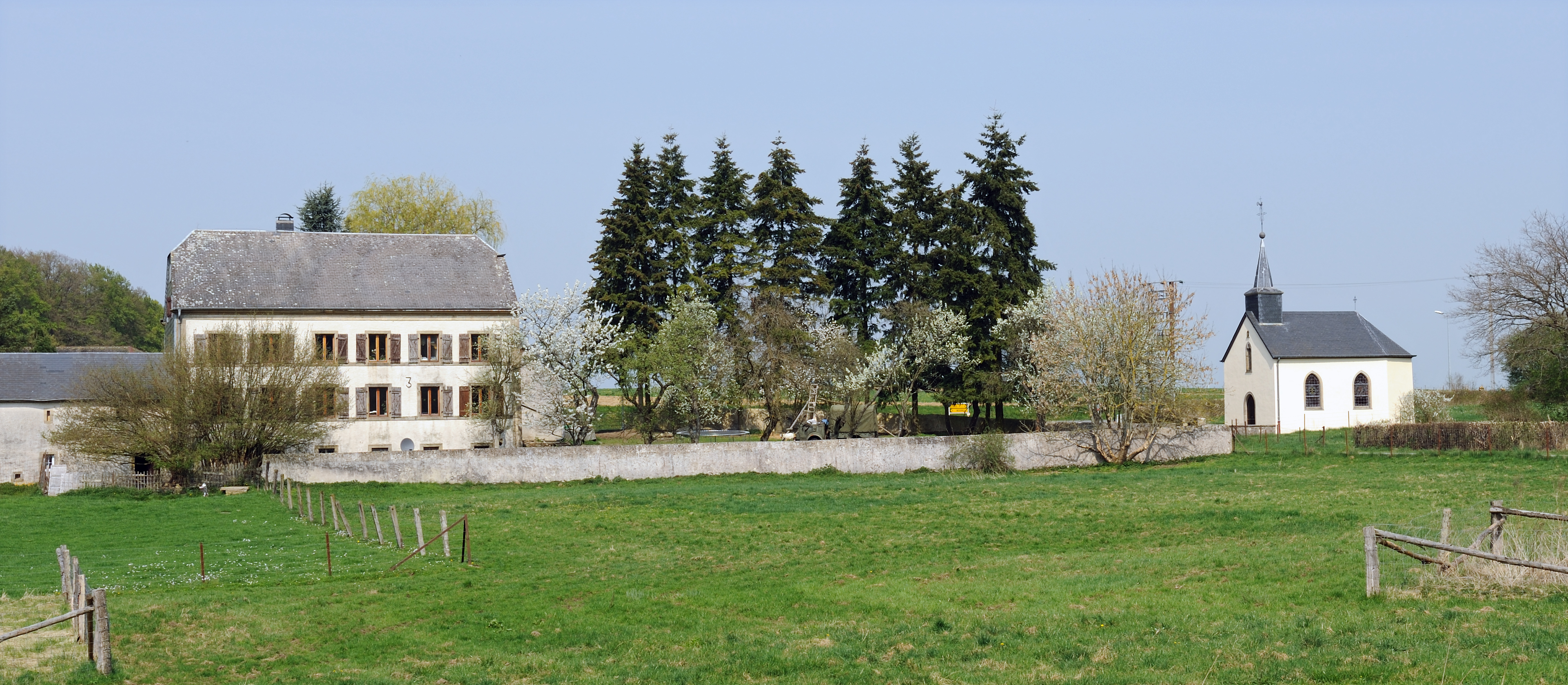
- View on Ehner
- Interactive map of Ehner
- Country: Luxembourg
- Canton: Redange
- Commune: Saeul

Population
  - Total: 51
- Time zone: UTC+1 (CET)
  - Summer (DST): UTC+2 (CEST)

Ehner (German pronunciation: [ˈeːnɐ]; Luxembourgish: Éiner or Iener) is a village in northwestern Luxembourg.

It is situated in the commune of Saeul and has a population of 44 as of 2026.

== Gallery ==
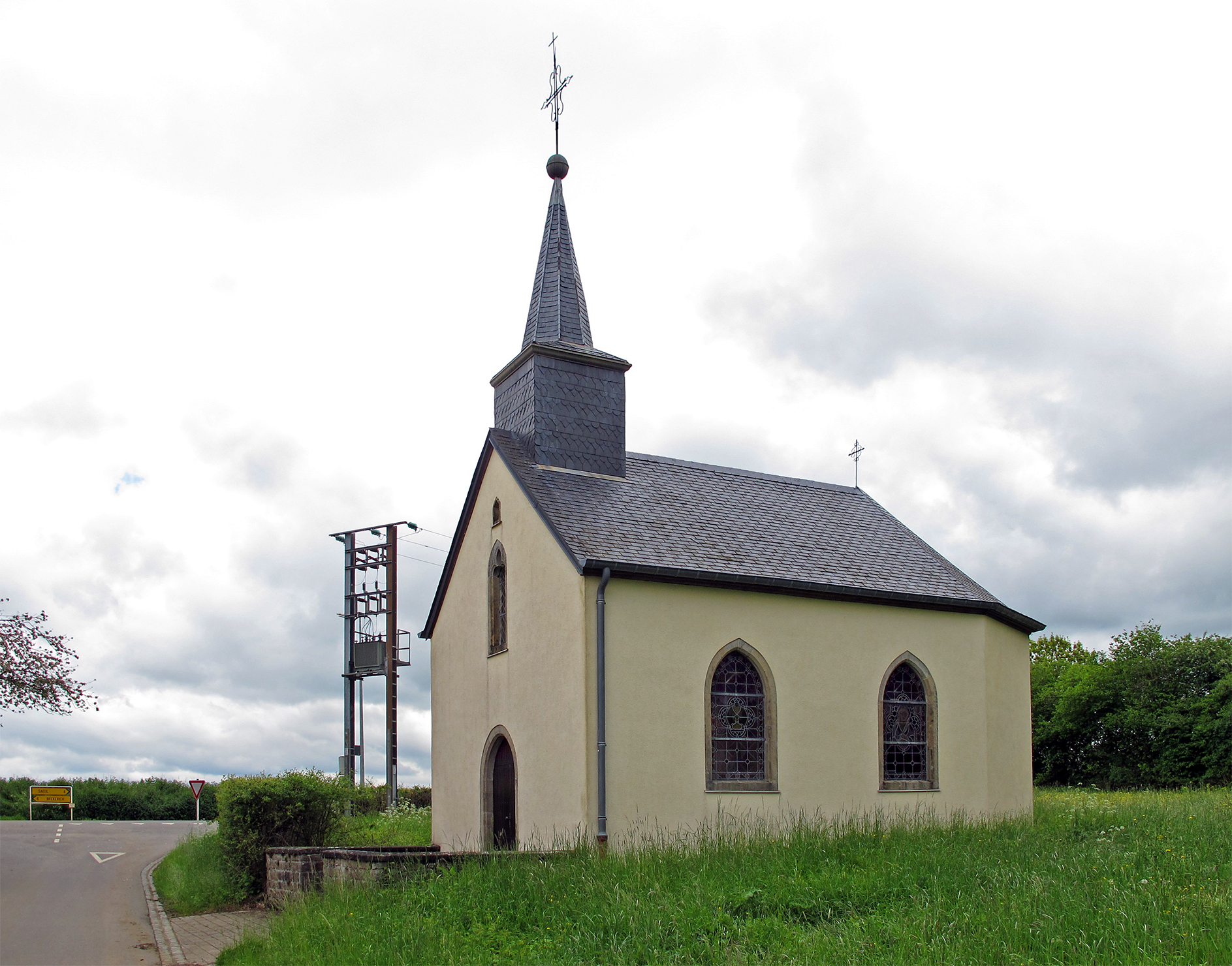
Chapel of Ehner

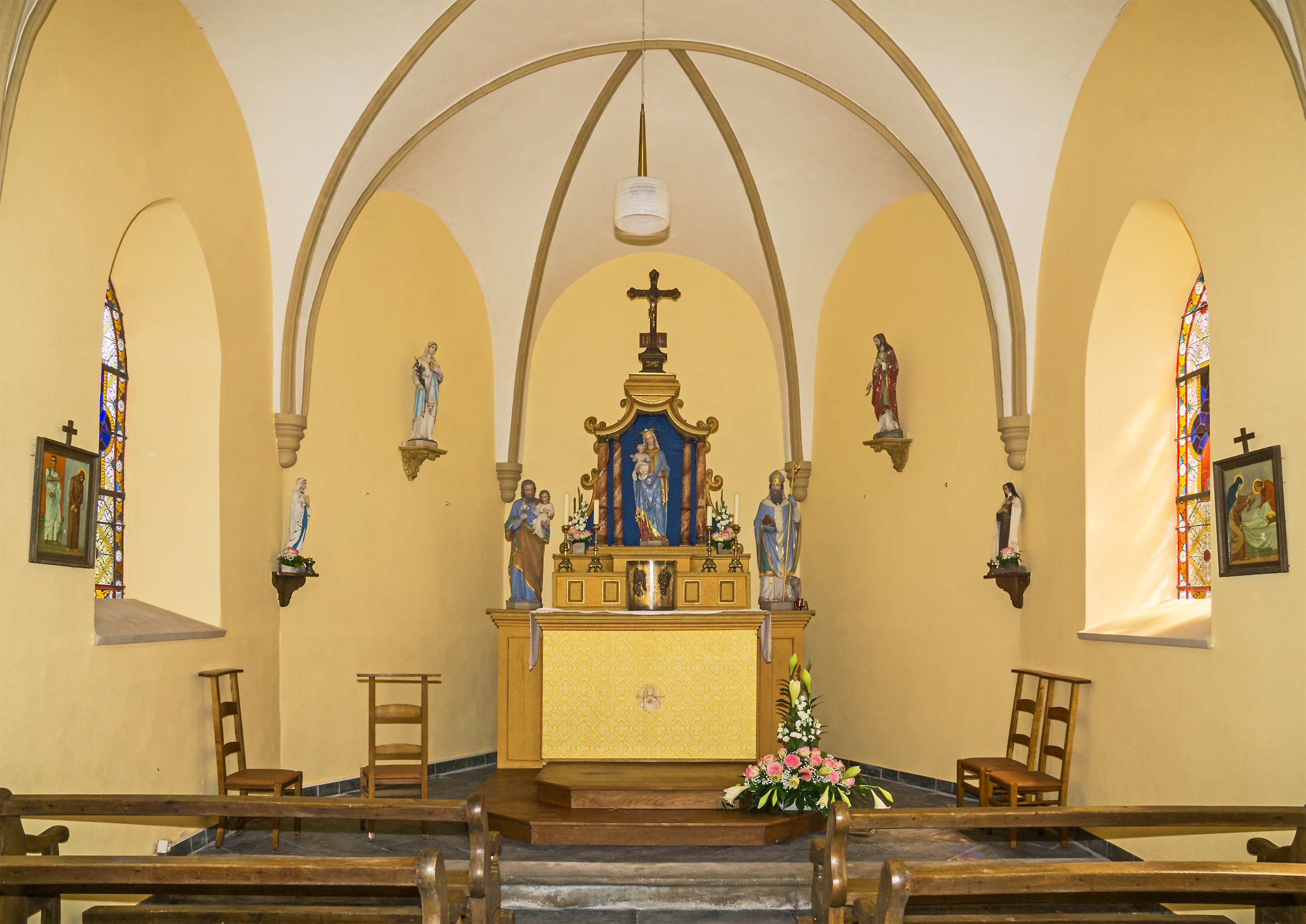
Interior of the chapel
