= Kapweiler =

Coordinates: 49°44′22″N 5°58′7″E

Kapweiler Kapwëller
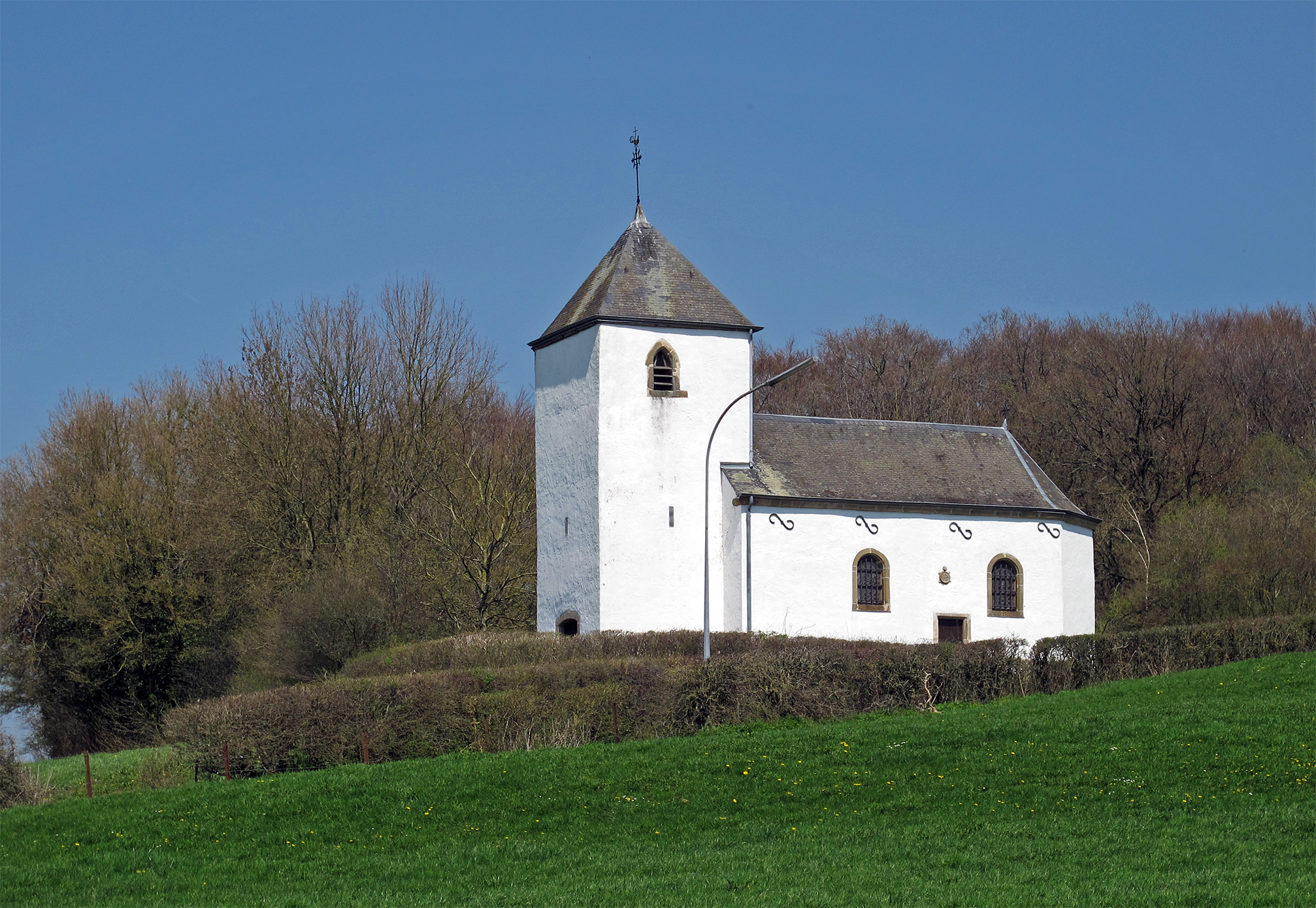
- Country: Luxembourg
- Canton: Redange
- Commune: Saeul

Government
  - Mayor: Raoul Clausse

Population (2026)
  - Total: 47

Kapweiler is a small village in the commune of Saeul, in western Luxembourg. As of September 2026, the town has a population of 47.
