= Allen Wyler =

American neurosurgeon

Allen R. Wyler is a neurosurgeon and author. He practiced neurosurgery at the University of Washington, University of Tennessee, and finally at Swedish Hospital in Seattle before leaving practice to become medical director for Northstar Neuroscience in 2002. He has written several books and articles on the subject of epilepsy as well as published multiple novels. He retired from Northstar in 2008 to spend more time writing fiction.
