= Weiler, Putscheid =

Village in Luxembourg

Coordinates: 49°57′45″N 6°07′22″E

Weiler Weiler/Weller
- Village
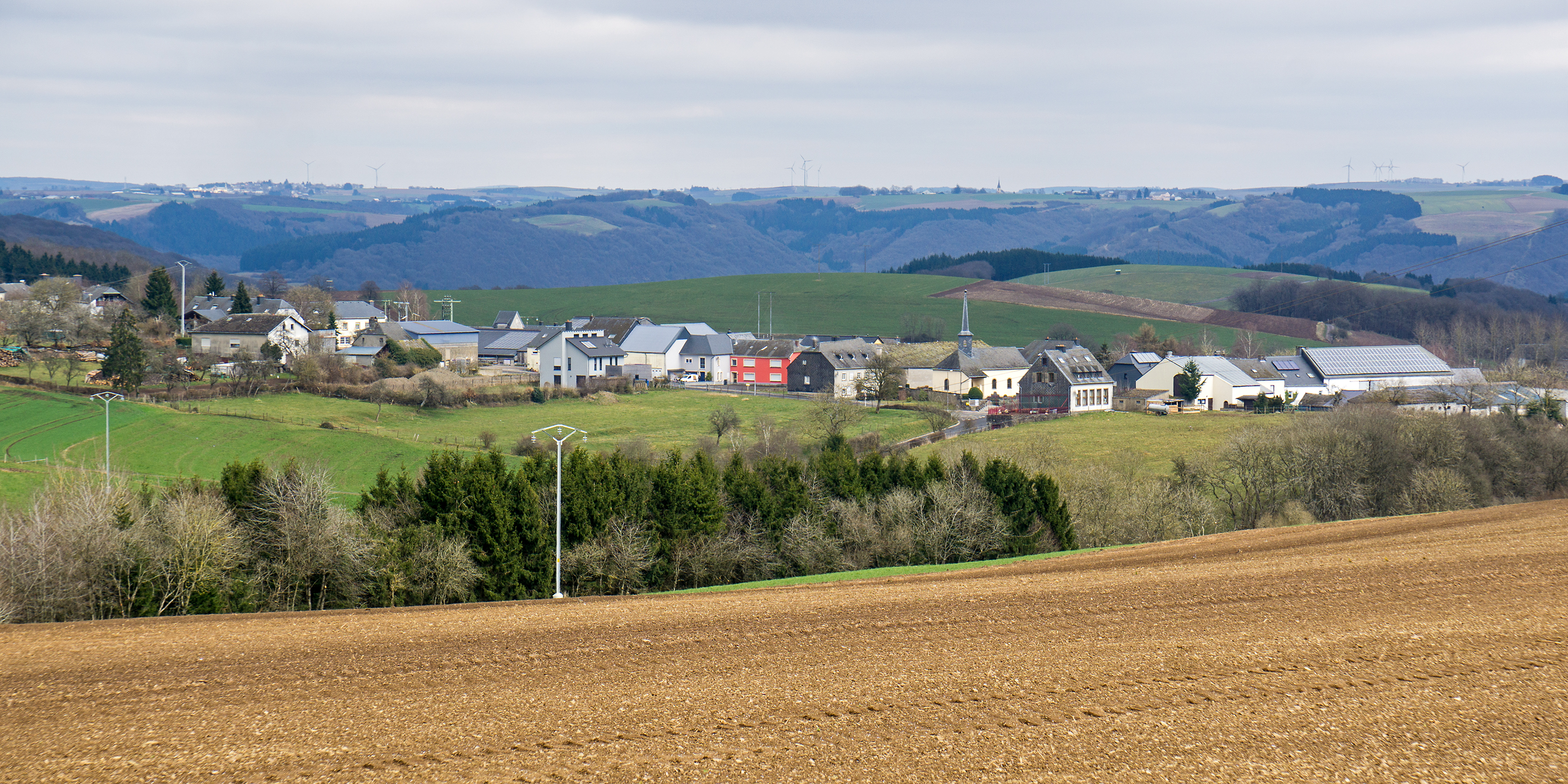
- View on Weiler
- Country: Luxembourg
- Canton: Vianden
- Commune: Putscheid

Population
  - Total: 158
- Time zone: UTC+1 (CET)
  - Summer (DST): UTC+2 (CEST)

Weiler (German pronunciation: [ˈvaɪlɐ]; Luxembourgish: Weiler or Weller) is a village in northeastern Luxembourg.

It is situated in the commune of Putscheid and has a population of 163 as of September 2026.

== Gallery ==
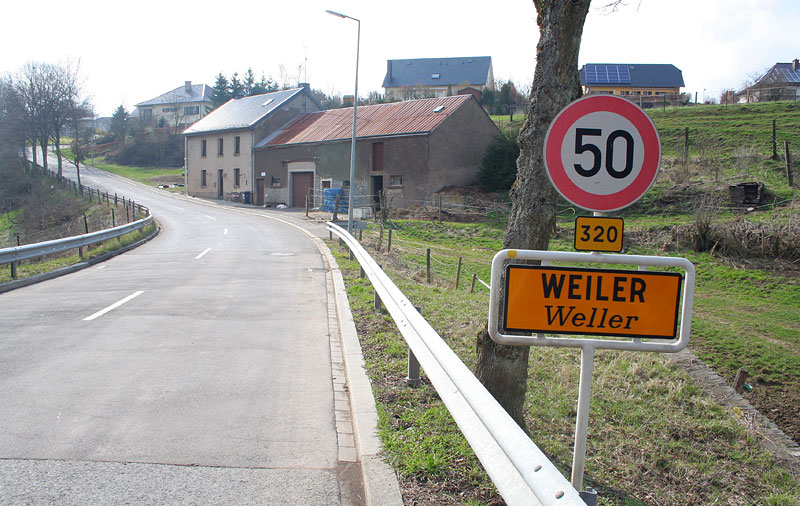

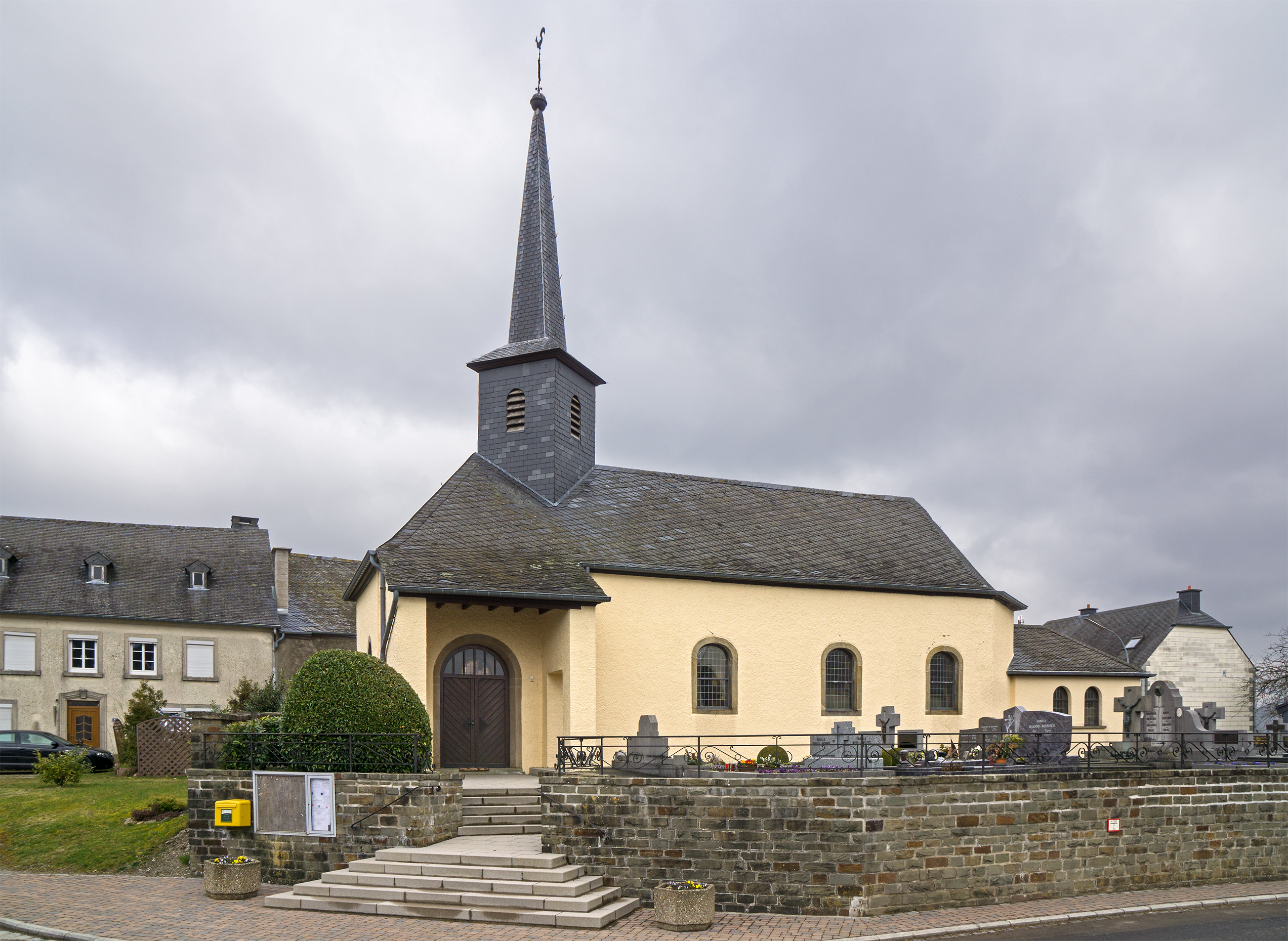
Church in Weiler
