= Koedange =

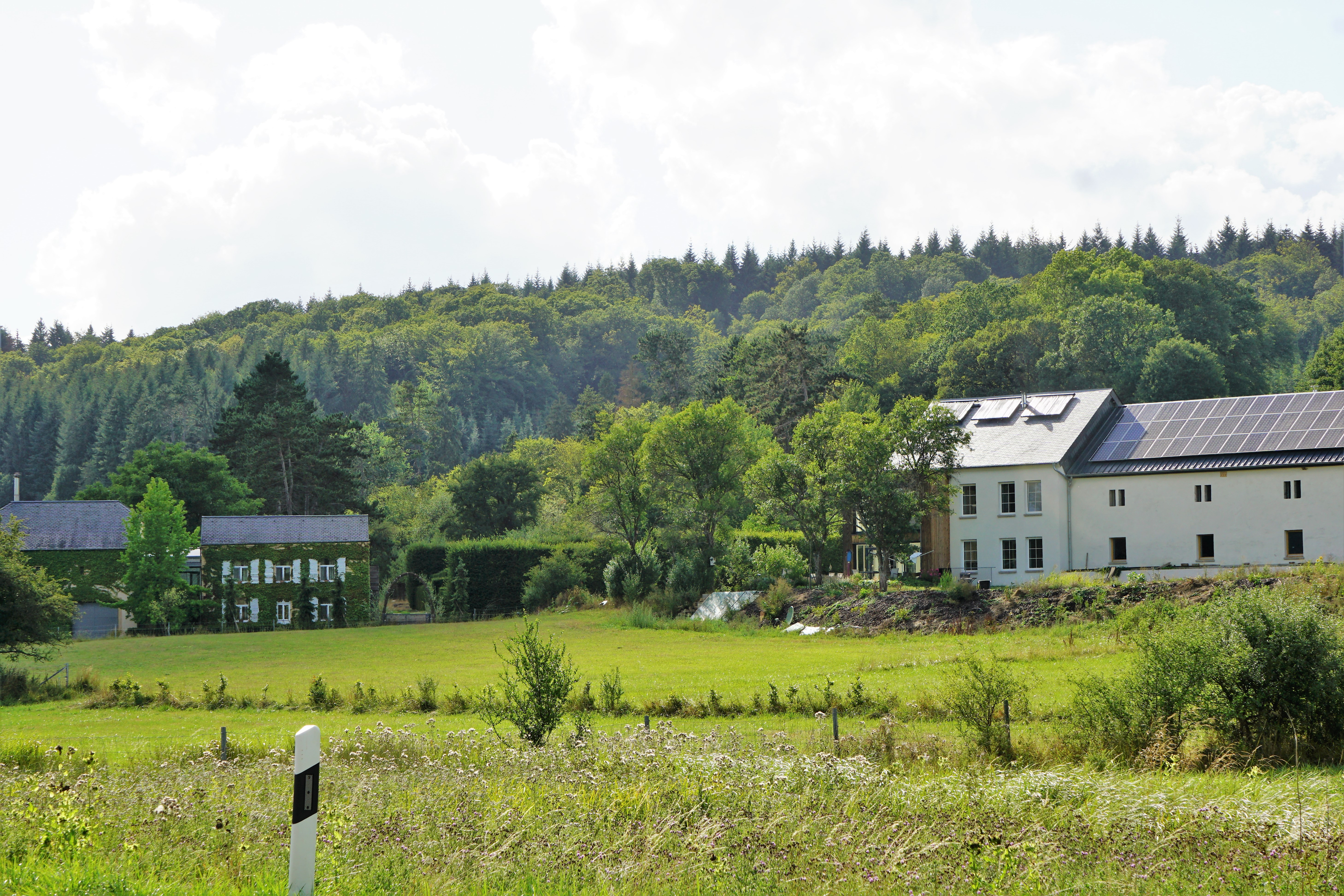
- Interactive map of Koedange
- Coordinates: 49°44′N 06°13′E
- District: Luxembourg
- Canton: Mersch
- Commune: Fischbach

Population
  - Total: 9
- Postal code: L-6155

Koedange (Luxembourgish: Kéideng) is a section of the Luxembourgish commune of Fischbach located in Luxembourg District and Mersch canton.
