= Calmus, Luxembourg =

Coordinates: 49°43′30″N 5°57′47″E

Calmus Kaalmes
- Former commune of Luxembourg
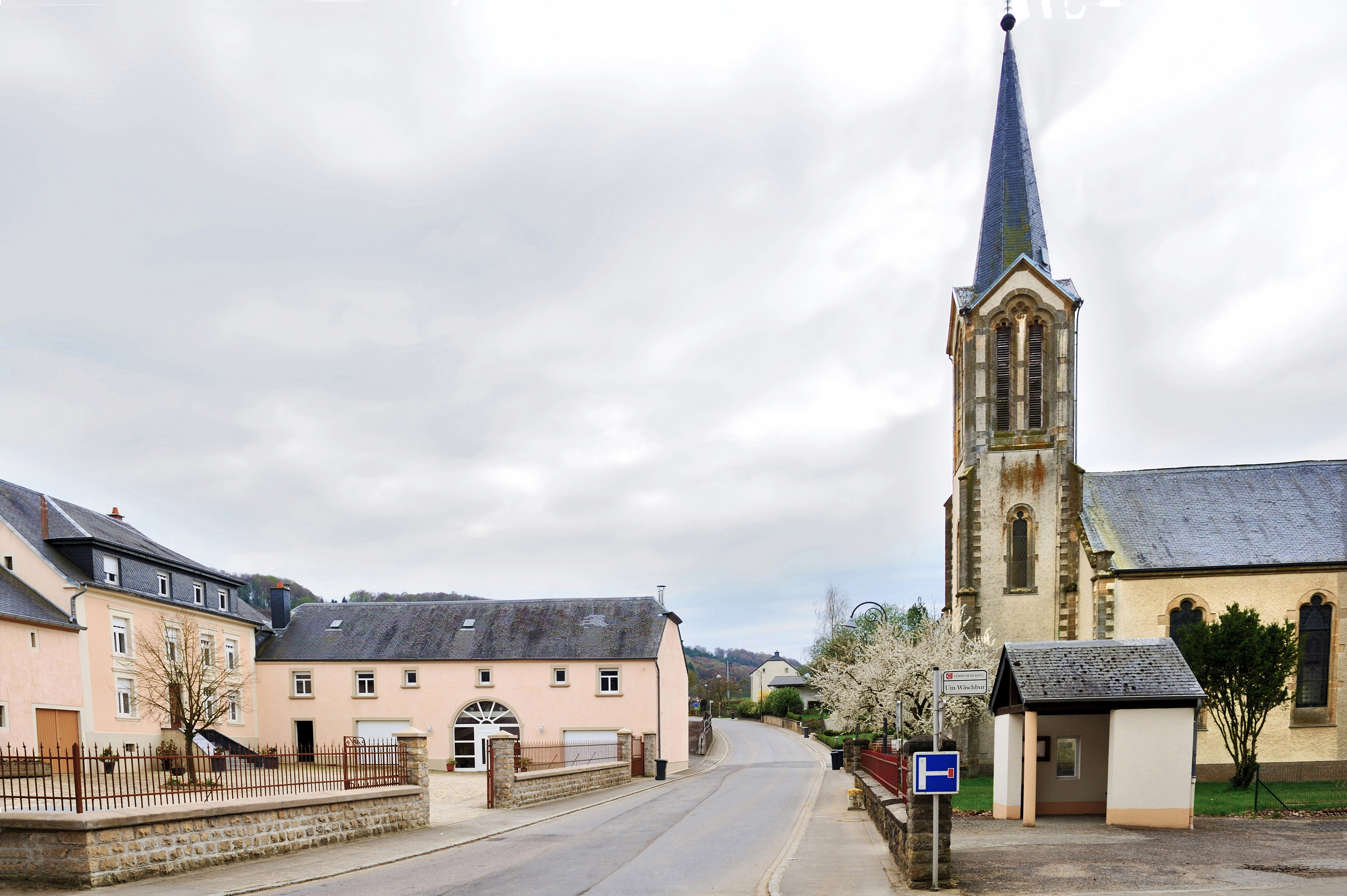
- Main street of the village of Calmus in Luxembourg
- Interactive map of Calmus
- Country: Luxembourg
- District: Diekirch
- Canton: Redange
- Created: Original commune
- Abolished: 8 August 1822
- Currently: Part of Saeul

Calmus (Luxembourgish: Kaalmes) is a village in the commune of Saeul, in Western Luxembourg. Nearby hill Ditzebierg offers a view of the entire Redange Canton. As of September 2026, the village has a population of 223.
