= Boevange =

Village and former commune in Luxembourg

Coordinates: 50°03′N 5°56′E

Boevange Béigen
- Former commune of Luxembourg
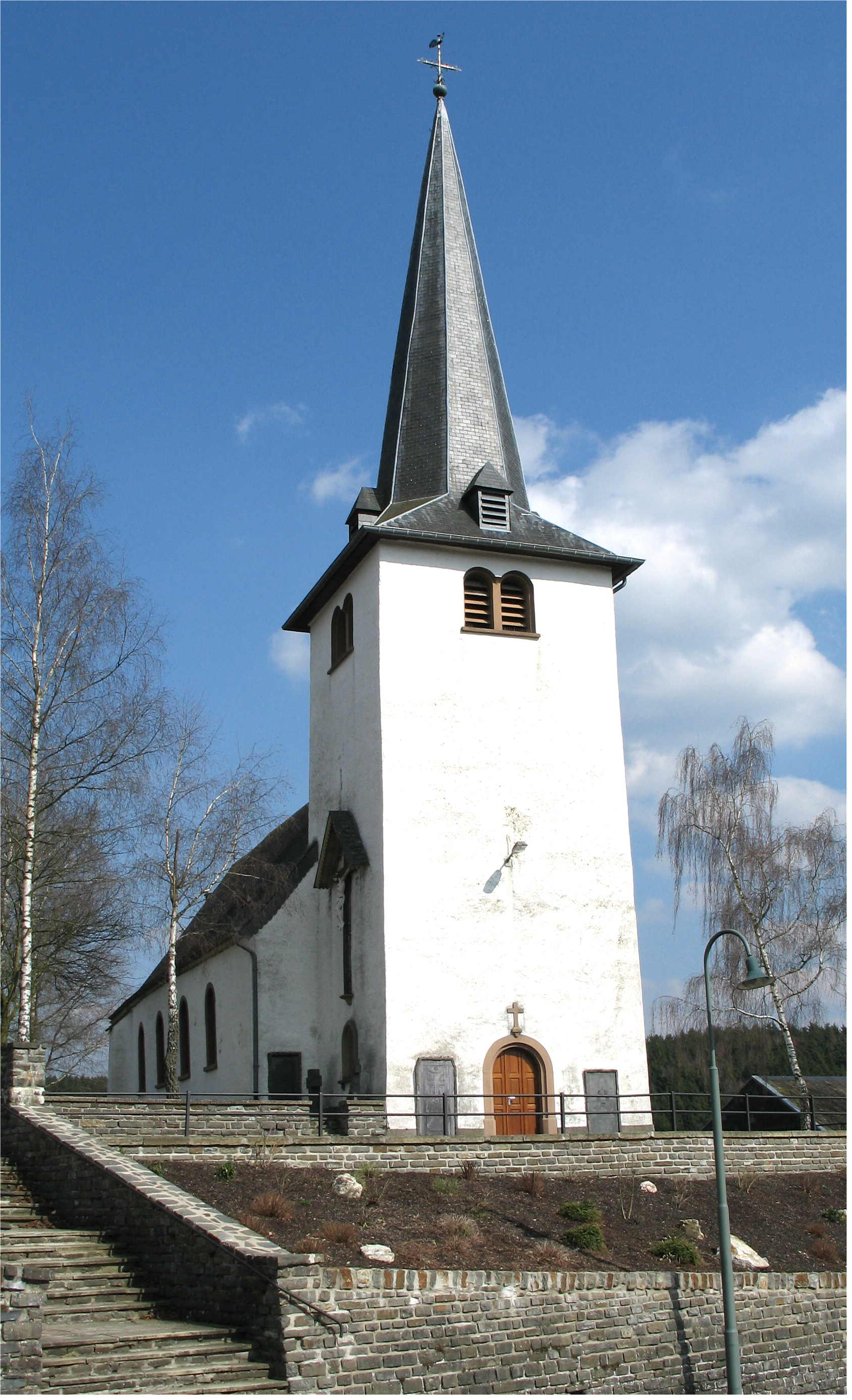

- Map of Luxembourg with the former commune highlighted in orange, and the canton in dark red
- Country: Luxembourg
- District: Diekirch
- Canton: Clervaux
- Created: Original commune
- Abolished: 1 January 1978
- Currently: Part of Wincrange

Boevange (French pronunciation: [bøvɑ̃ʒ]; Luxembourgish: Béigen, German: Böwingen [ˈbøːvɪŋən]) is a village in the commune of Wincrange, in northern Luxembourg. As of September 2026, the village had a population of 320.

Boevange was a commune in the canton of Clervaux until 1 January 1978, when it was merged with the communes of Asselborn, Hachiville, and Oberwampach to form the new commune of Wincrange. The law creating Wincrange was passed on 31 October 1977.

== Former commune ==
The former commune consisted of the villages:

- Boevange
- Deiffelt
- Doennange
- Hamiville
- Crendal
- Lullange
- Troine
- Wincrange
- Lentzweiler - partly shared with the former commune of Asselborn
- Hinterhasselt (lieu-dit)
- Antoniushof (lieu-dit)
- Troine-Route (lieu-dit)
