= Asselborn =

Village and former commune in Luxembourg

Asselborn Aasselbuer
- Village
- Interactive map of Asselborn
- Country: Luxembourg
- District: Diekirch
- Canton: Clervaux
- Created: Original commune
- Abolished: 1 January 1978
- Currently: Part of Wincrange

Asselborn (German pronunciation: [ˈasl̩ˌbɔʁn]; Luxembourgish: Aasselbuer) is a small town in the commune of Wincrange, in northern Luxembourg. As of September 2026, the town has a population of 453.

Asselborn was a commune in the canton of Clervaux until 1 January 1978, when it was merged with the communes of Boevange, Hachiville, and Oberwampach to form the new commune of Wincrange. The law creating Wincrange was passed on 31 October 1977.

== Climate ==
Climate data for Asselborn (1991–2020)
Month	Jan	Feb	Mar	Apr	May	Jun	Jul	Aug	Sep	Oct	Nov	Dec	Year
Record high °C (°F)	12.5 (54.5)	20.3 (68.5)	21.9 (71.4)	23.3 (73.9)	29.6 (85.3)	33.4 (92.1)	37.9 (100.2)	36.5 (97.7)	32.4 (90.3)	26.9 (80.4)	20.4 (68.7)	13.7 (56.7)	37.9 (100.2)
Mean daily maximum °C (°F)	3.2 (37.8)	4.4 (39.9)	8.7 (47.7)	13.2 (55.8)	17.3 (63.1)	20.4 (68.7)	22.5 (72.5)	22.2 (72.0)	18.0 (64.4)	12.8 (55.0)	7.1 (44.8)	3.9 (39.0)	12.8 (55.0)
Daily mean °C (°F)	1.2 (34.2)	1.7 (35.1)	4.7 (40.5)	8.4 (47.1)	12.1 (53.8)	15.2 (59.4)	17.0 (62.6)	16.5 (61.7)	12.8 (55.0)	9.0 (48.2)	4.7 (40.5)	2.0 (35.6)	8.8 (47.8)
Mean daily minimum °C (°F)	−1.5 (29.3)	−1.5 (29.3)	0.7 (33.3)	3.2 (37.8)	7.0 (44.6)	9.9 (49.8)	11.8 (53.2)	11.4 (52.5)	8.4 (47.1)	5.7 (42.3)	2.2 (36.0)	−0.5 (31.1)	4.7 (40.5)
Record low °C (°F)	−19.7 (−3.5)	−18.4 (−1.1)	−17.6 (0.3)	−7.2 (19.0)	−2.7 (27.1)	−2.5 (27.5)	3.2 (37.8)	0.8 (33.4)	−0.4 (31.3)	−7.4 (18.7)	−14.1 (6.6)	−21.7 (−7.1)	−18.4 (−1.1)
Average precipitation mm (inches)	74.9 (2.95)	61.0 (2.40)	59.7 (2.35)	48.3 (1.90)	68.2 (2.69)	70.5 (2.78)	64.9 (2.56)	80.6 (3.17)	63.7 (2.51)	67.5 (2.66)	69.7 (2.74)	90.2 (3.55)	819.2 (32.25)
Average precipitation days (≥ 1.0 mm)	12.8	11.2	11.0	9.1	10.3	10.4	10.2	10.3	9.4	11.5	12.9	13.8	132.7
Source: NOAA

== Former commune ==
The former commune consisted of the villages:

- Asselborn
- Boxhorn
- Maulusmühle
- Rumlange
- Sassel
- Stockem
- Uschler
- Lentzweiler - partly shared with the former commune of Boevange
- Asselborn-Moulin (lieu-dit)
- Emeschbach-Asselborn (lieu-dit)
- Emeschbach-Stockem (lieu-dit)
- Bockmühle (lieu-dit)
- Cinqfontaines (lieu-dit)
- Asselborn-Route (lieu-dit)
- Stockem-Route (lieu-dit)
