= Oberwampach =

Coordinates: 50°01′N 5°52′E

Oberwampach Uewerwampech
- Former commune of Luxembourg
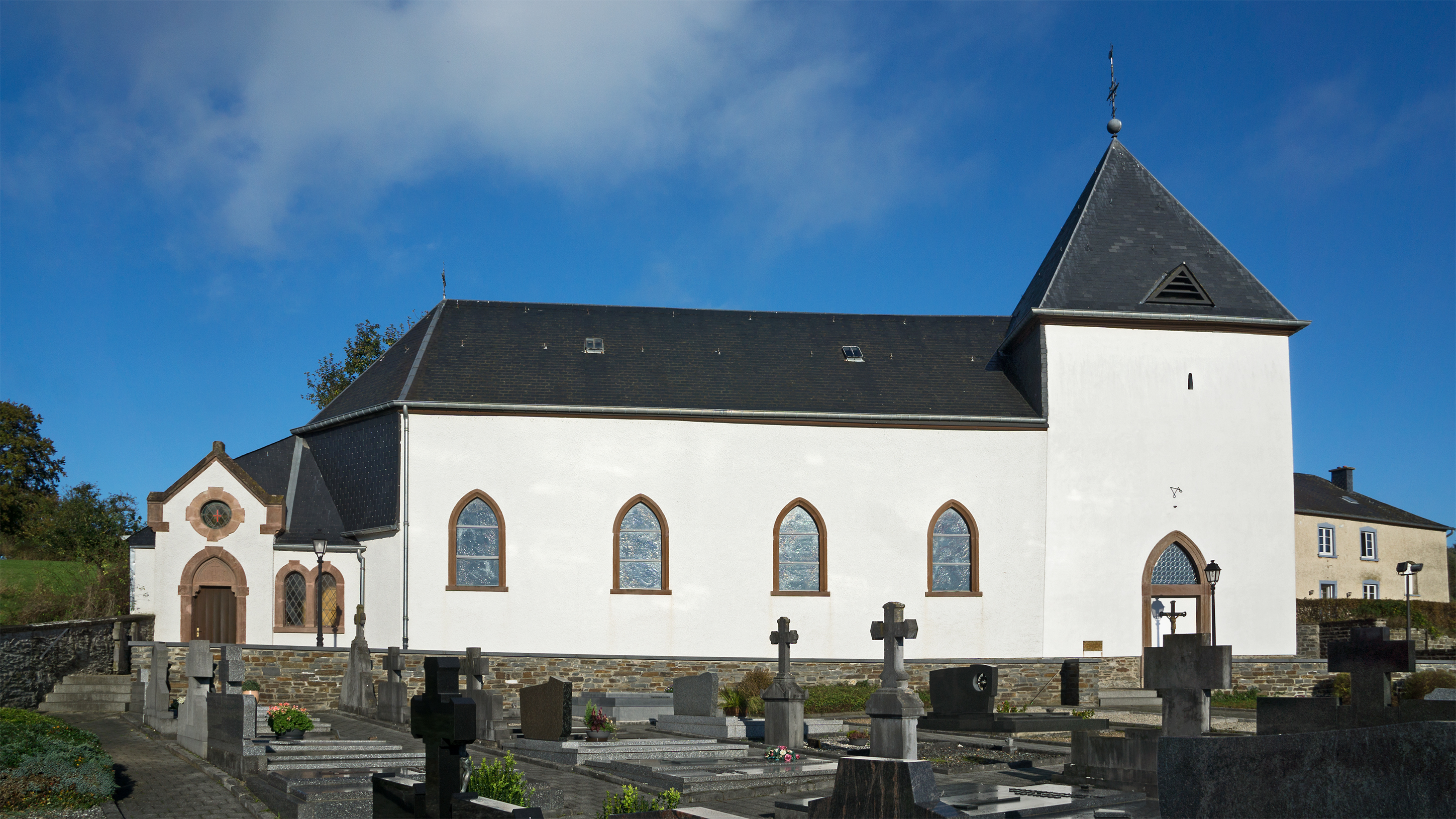
- Oberwampach Church
- Interactive map of Oberwampach
- Country: Luxembourg
- District: Diekirch
- Canton: Clervaux
- Created: Original commune
- Abolished: 1 January 1978
- Currently: Part of Wincrange

Oberwampach (German pronunciation: [ˈoːbɐˌvampax]; Luxembourgish: Uewerwampech; both lit. 'Upper Wampach', in contrast to "Lower Wampach") is a village in the commune of Wincrange, in northern Luxembourg. As of September 2026, the village had a population of 264.

Oberwampach was a commune in the canton of Clervaux until 1 January 1978, when it was merged with the communes of Asselborn, Boevange, and Hachiville to form the new commune of Wincrange. The law creating Wincrange was passed on 31 October 1977.

During the Battle of the Bulge, Oberwampach was the stage of a fierce battle between German and American troops in January 1945.

== Former commune ==
The former commune consisted of the villages:

- Allerborn
- Brachtenbach
- Derenbach
- Niederwampach
- Schimpach
- Oberwampach
- Birkenhof (lieu-dit)
- Buschweg (lieu-dit)
- Schimpach-Station (lieu-dit)

== People ==
Soldier and military engineer Johan Caspar von Cicignon was born in Oberwampach circa 1625.
