= Hachiville =

Village in Wincrange, Luxembourg

Coordinates: 50°06′N 5°55′E

Hachiville Helzen Helzingen (German)
- Former commune of Luxembourg
- Interactive map of Hachiville
- Country: Luxembourg
- District: Diekirch
- Canton: Clervaux
- Created: Original commune
- Abolished: 1 January 1978
- Currently: Part of Wincrange

Hachiville (French pronunciation: [aʃivil]; Luxembourgish: Helzen; German: Helzingen [ˈhɛltsɪŋən]) is a village in the commune of Wincrange, in northern Luxembourg. As of September 2026, the village has a population of 207.

Hachiville was a commune in the canton of Clervaux until 1 January 1978, when it was merged with the communes of Asselborn, Boevange, and Oberwampach to form the new commune of Wincrange. The law creating Wincrange was passed on 31 October 1977.

The name Hachiville appears for the first time in a charter in the year 1130. It is believed, however, that the site has been inhabited since Celtic times and that it was occupied by the Romans. The village's greatest fame lies in its celebrated hermitage, which is probably located on an ancient Celtic place of worship.

== Former commune ==
The former commune consisted of the villages:

- Hachiville
- Hoffelt
- Weiler
- Neumühle
- Lehresmühle
- Moulin-Neuf (lieu-dit)

== Church ==
=== The Altar Screen ===
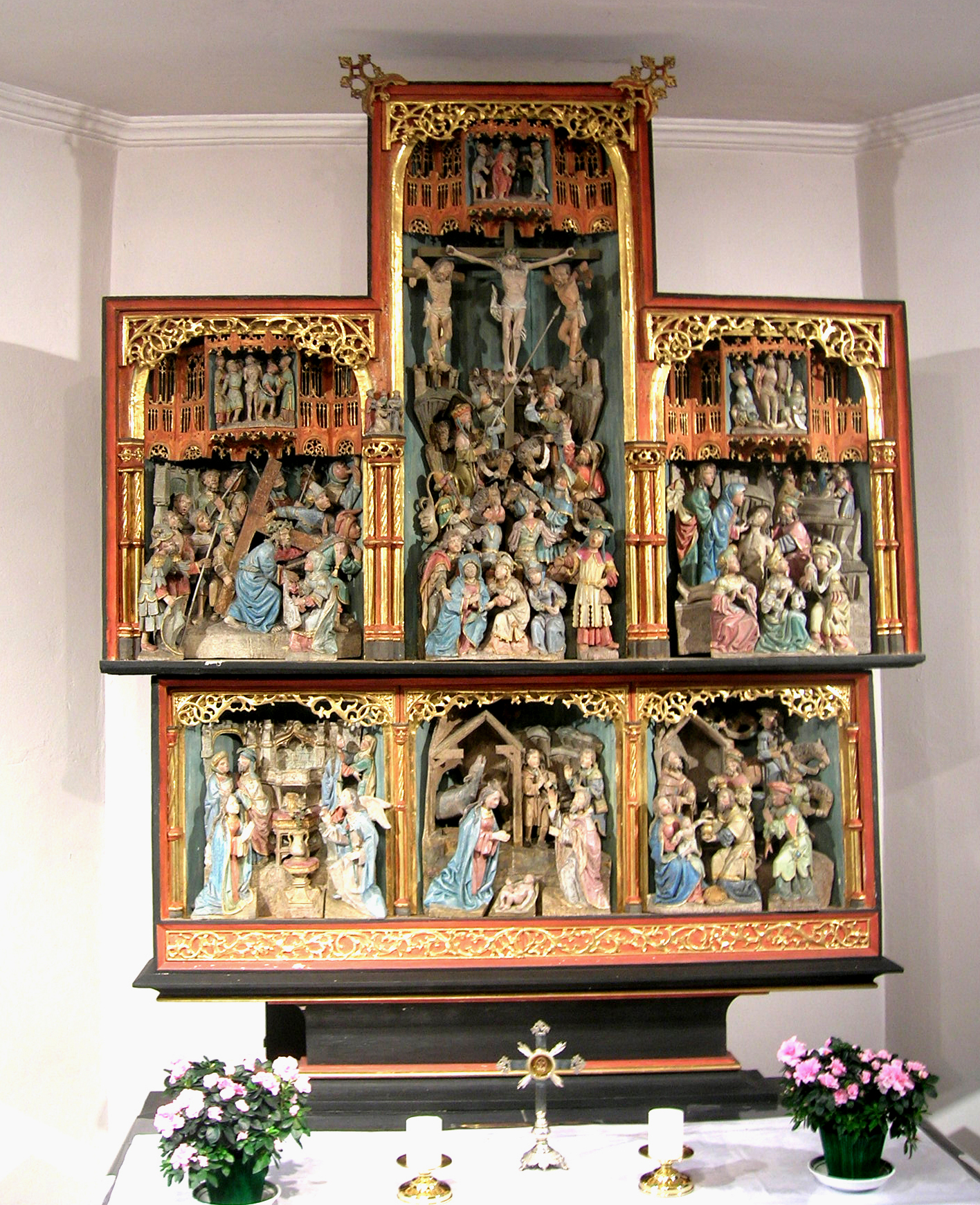
The Helzer Klaus altarpiece

The carved altar screen now displayed in Hachiville's baroque parish church is considered one of Luxembourg's most precious art treasures. Originally housed in the hermitage chapel just outside the village, the piece, which appears to date from the sixteenth century, depicts scenes from the life and the passion of Christ. The hermitage chapel, Helzer Klaus, revered as a pilgrimage site in its own right, now contains a plaster copy of this original altarpiece. In 1973, Luxembourg issued a set of stamps depicting images of religious statues based on this altarpiece. A few years later, in August 1976, the altarpiece was stolen. Fortunately, it was found a little more than a month later, packaged and ready to ship abroad. The mystery of who planned the crime still remains.

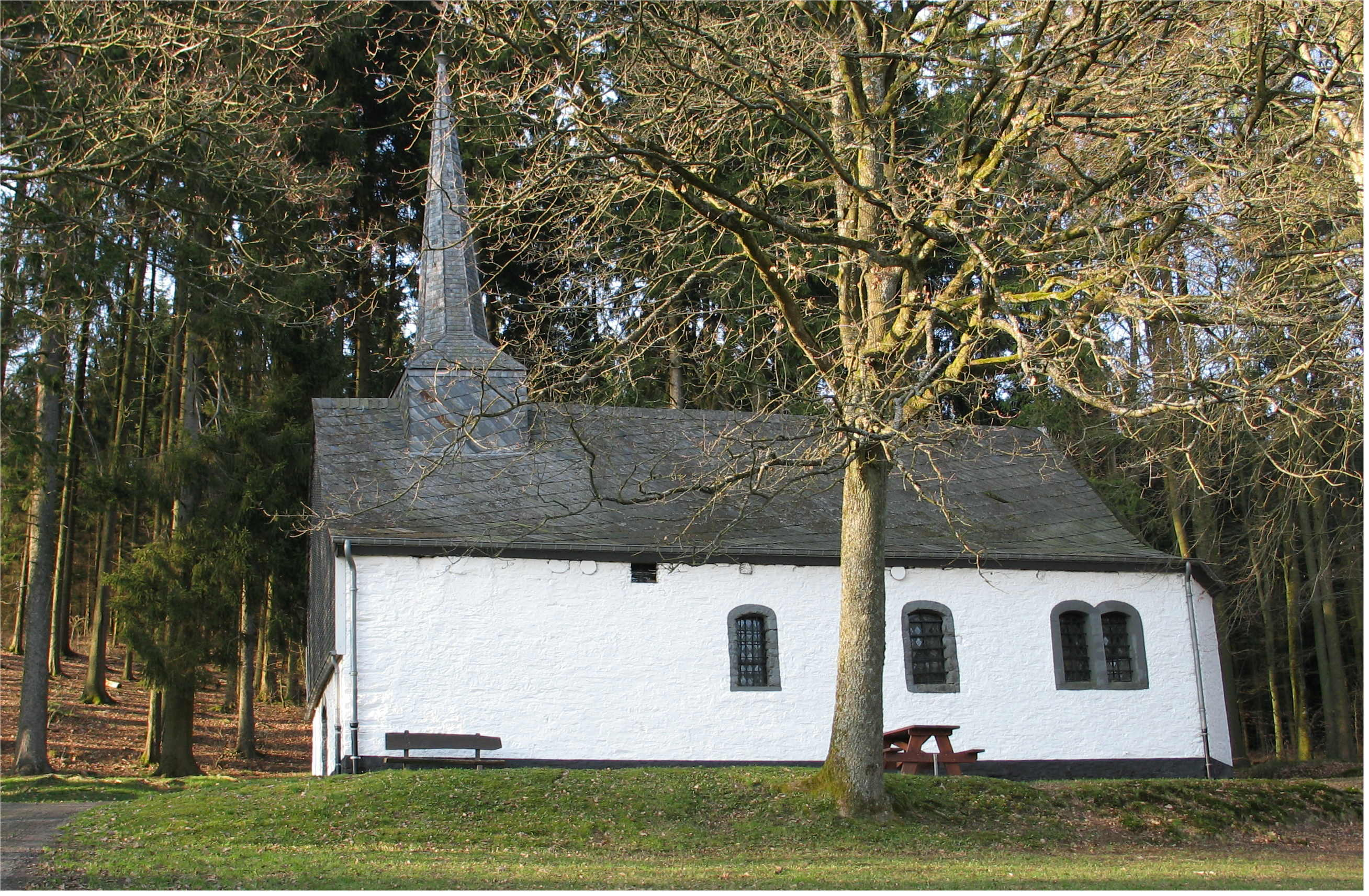
The Helzer Klaus, or the hermitage chapel

Legend shrouds the origin of this altar screen. According to the story, the screen came from Frankish lands and was intended for a church in Belgium. However, as the oxen stopped for a drink at the mineral spring that still flows by the hermitage, they were shackled to the ground by some invisible power. The cart that bore the altarpiece was too heavy to move by any human means, and the art it contained was too costly to take any chances with. This was seen as a miraculous sign from the Queen of Heaven that she desired the altar to be built here, in the old chapel at the edge of a beech grove.

The hermitage itself has also been honored with a stamp. A watercolor depiction of the restored chapel was featured in a stamp set in 1989.

=== Folk Belief ===
A divination ritual is associated with the hermitage and its mineral spring. It has been said that if you are unmarried and in search of a spouse, you must make your way to the chapel and walk three times around it without being observed. Then you should beat your head twice against a thick tree standing there (or is it once against each of two trees?), followed by a jump barefoot into the spring which flows close to the chapel door. If all these rituals have been successful, in the silence you should hear the name of your future husband or wife in the burbling of the water.
