= Binsfeld (disambiguation) =

Binsfeld is a municipality in Rhineland-Palatinate, Germany.

Binsfeld may also refer to:

- Binsfeld, Luxembourg, village in Luxembourg
- Binsfeld (Nörvenich), a district in the municipality of Nörvenich, North Rhine-Westphalia, Germany

== People with the surname ==
- Amy Binsfeld (born 1976), American politician
- Connie Binsfeld (1924–2014), American politician
- Peter Binsfeld (c. 1540 – 1598 or 1603), German Roman Catholic bishop and theologian
