= Doennange =

Coordinates: 50°04′N 5°57′E

Doennange Diänjen Dönningen (German)
- Interactive map of Doennange
- Country: Luxembourg
- District: Diekirch
- Canton: Clervaux

Doennange (French pronunciation: [dœnãʒ]; Luxembourgish: Diänjen; German: Dönningen [ˈdœnɪŋən]) is a village in the commune of Wincrange, in northern Luxembourg. As of September 2026, the village has a population of 174.

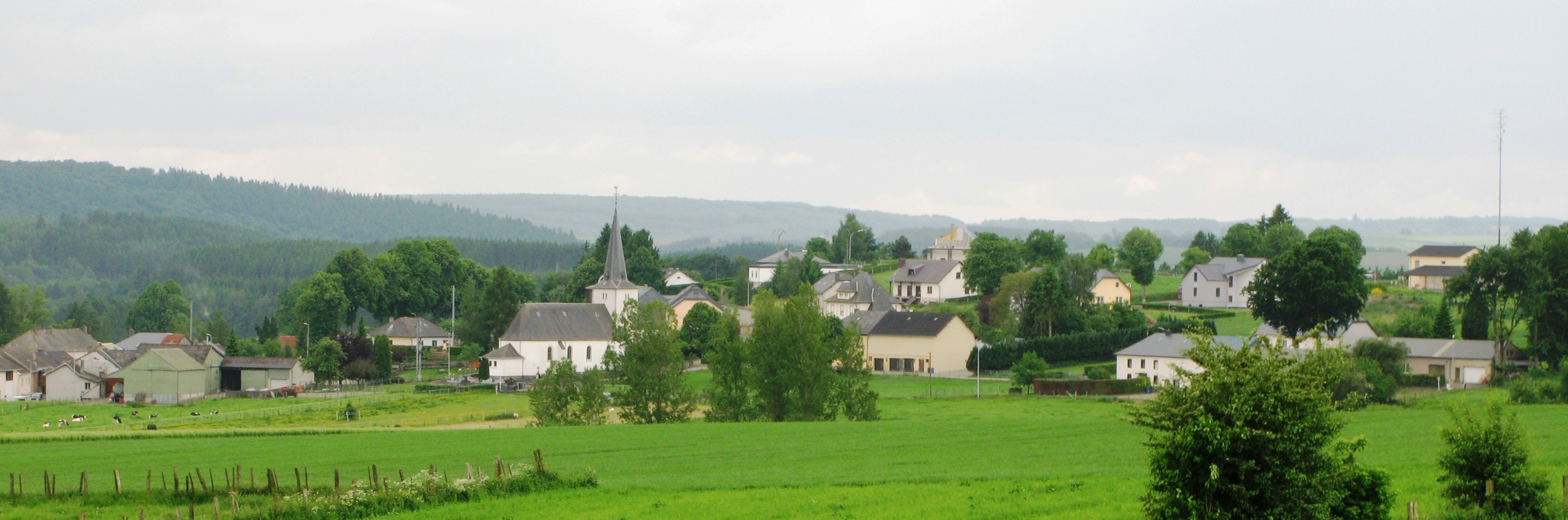

== History ==
Before the formation of the commune of Wincrange on January 1, 1978, Doennange belonged to the former commune of Boevange.
