= Lancaster Memorial =

Lancaster Memorial may refer to:

- Lancaster Memorial (Netherlands)
- Lancaster Memorial (Luxembourg)
