= Leithum, Luxembourg =

Leithum
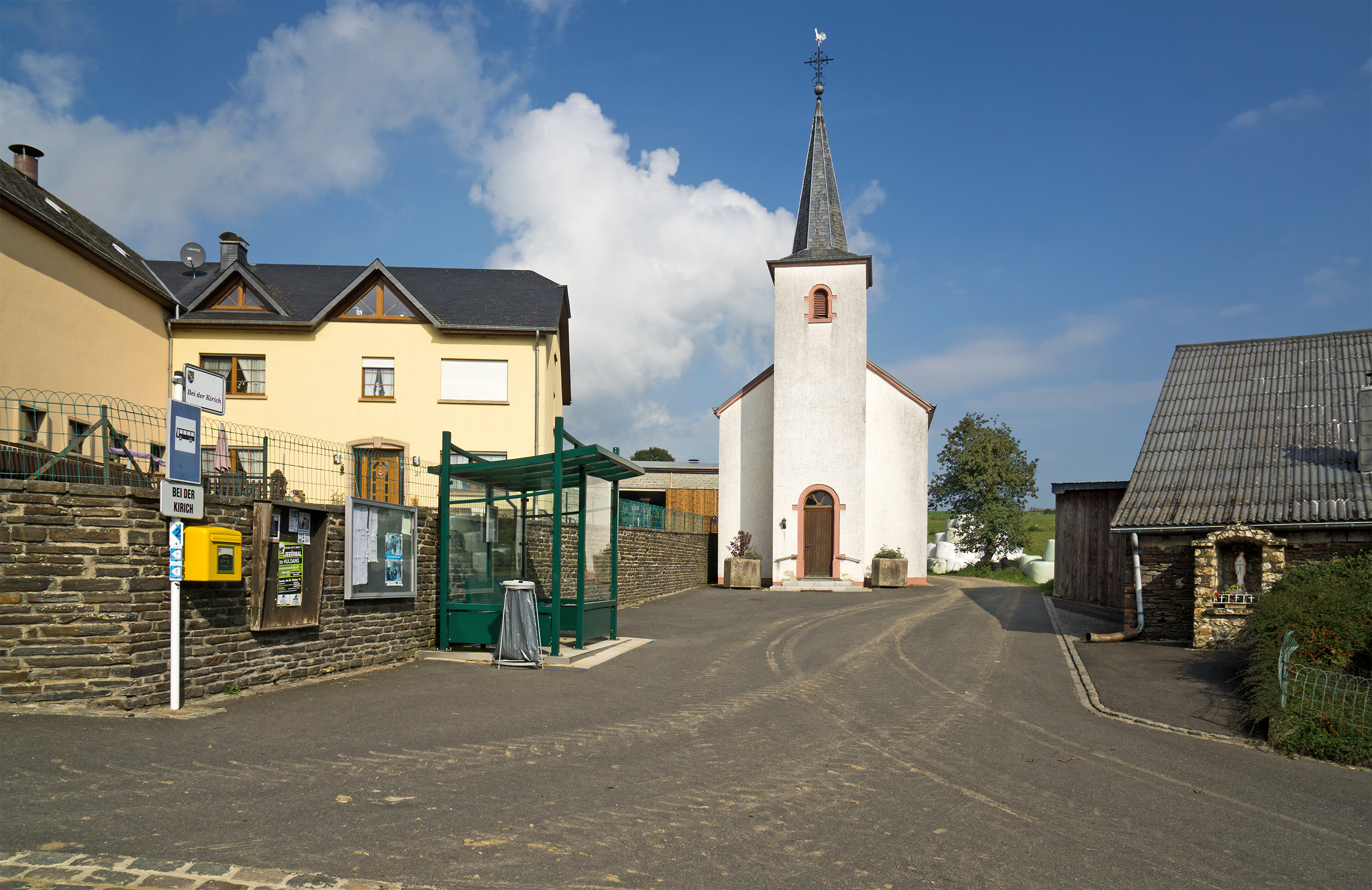
- Leithum church

- Location within Luxembourg
- Coordinates: 50.16083°N 6.108889°E
- Country: Luxembourg
- Canton: Clervaux
- Commune: Weiswampach

Leithum (Luxembourgish: Leetem) is a village in the commune of Weiswampach, in northern Luxembourg, located at the border with Belgium. As of September 2026, it has a population of 163.

Leithum's border crossing connects it by direct roads to both Oberhausen and Stoubach 1 kilometre (0.62 mi) away in Belgium's High Fens – Eifel Nature Park, and there across the German border to Welchenhausen and Stupbach, respectively.

During the Battle of the Bulge in World War II, Leithum was the last village in Luxembourg from which German forces were driven out, on 1 February 1945, three days after nearby Beiler.
