= 1681 Trondhjem fire =

Major fire in Trondhjem, Norway

Coordinates: 63.4302°N 10.3977°E

The 1681 Trondhjem fire started on 18 April 1681, in a building near Nidelva, an area of the city of Trondhjem, Søndre Trondhjems amt, Norway. Large parts of the city centre were destroyed, including the quay houses and Vår Frue Church. Timber merchant Thomas Hammond perished during the fire.

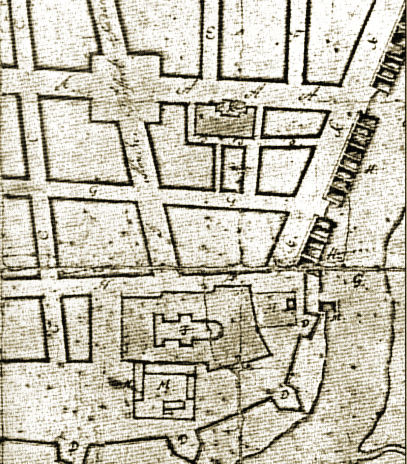
Section of Cicignon's city plan for Trondhjem, after the 1681 fire.

After the fire incident, a new city plan of Trondhjem was developed by Johan Caspar von Cicignon, on the initiative of King Christian V.
