= Niederwampach =

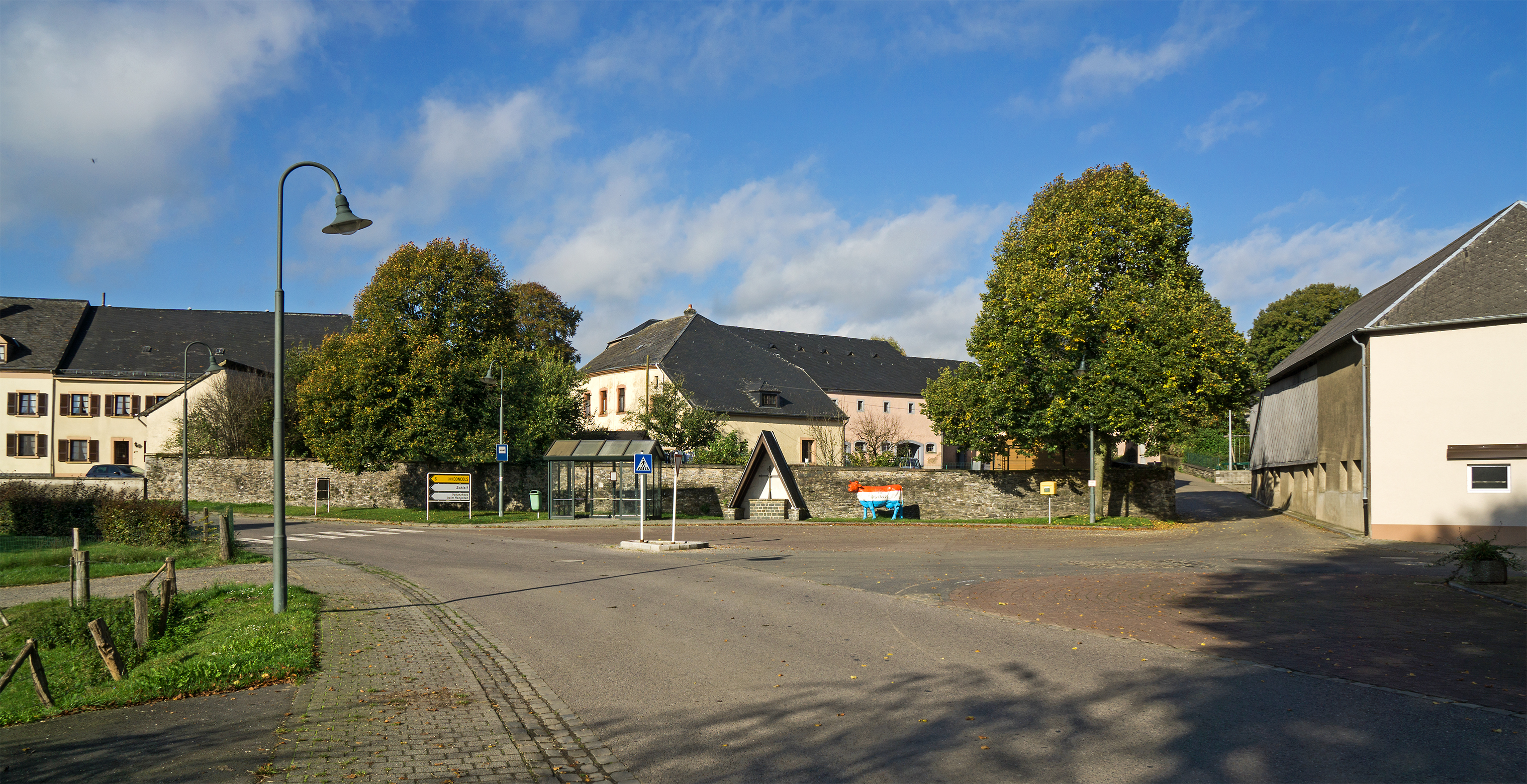
Main crossing in Niederwampach

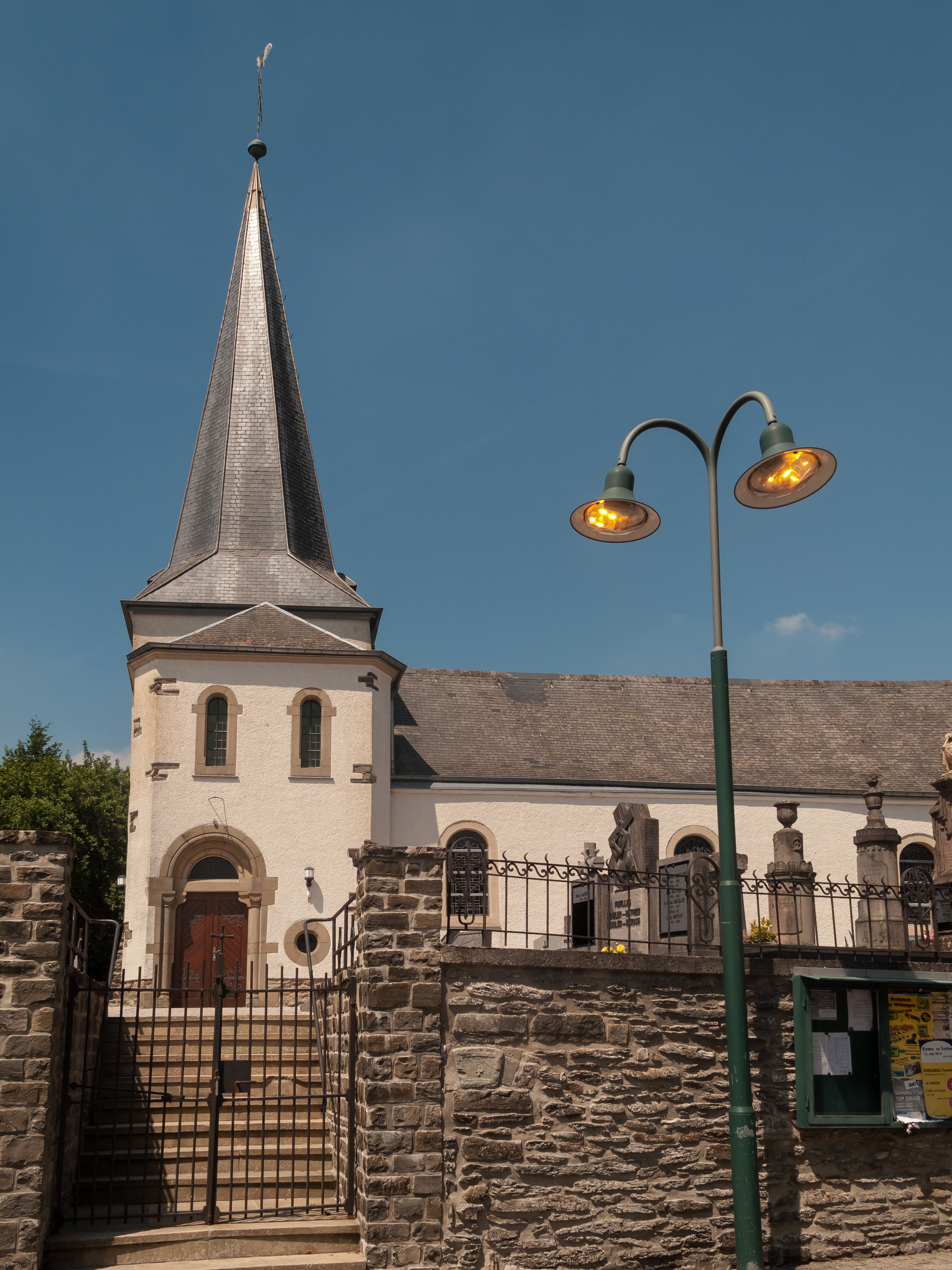
Niederwampach, church

Niederwampach (German pronunciation: [ˈniːdɐˌvampax]; Luxembourgish: Nidderwampech; both lit. 'Lower Wampach', in contrast to "Upper Wampach") is a village in the commune of Wincrange, in northern Luxembourg. As of September 2026, the village had a population of 271.
