= Weiswampach =

Weiswampach Wäiswampech (Luxembourgish)
- Commune
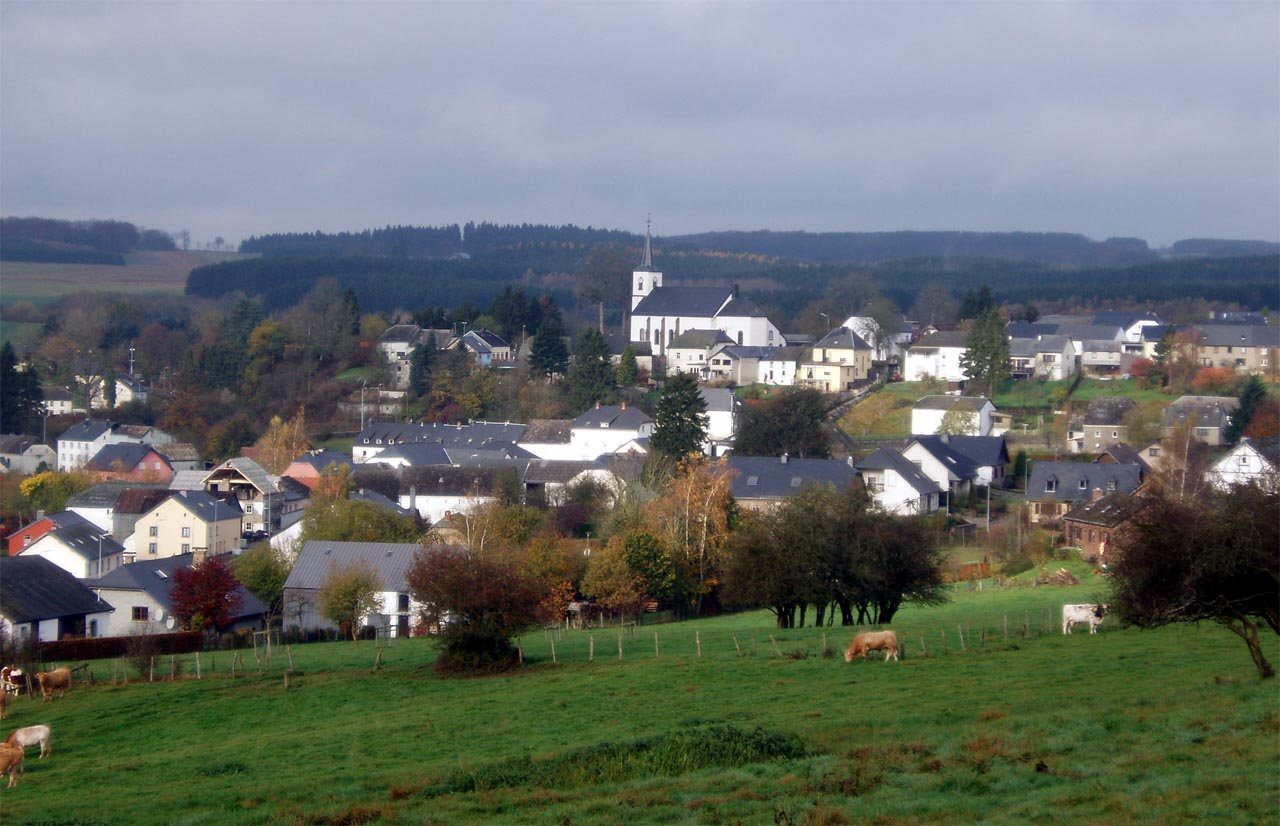

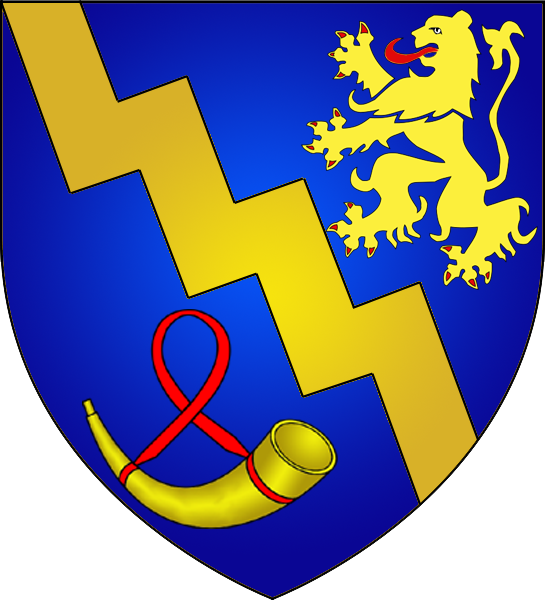
- Coat of arms

- Map of Luxembourg with Weiswampach highlighted in orange, and the canton in dark red
- Coordinates: 50.1333°N 6.0667°E
- Country: Luxembourg
- Canton: Clervaux

Government
  - Mayor: Néckel Polfer (DP)

Area
  - Total: 35.25 km^{2} (13.61 sq mi)
  - Rank: 18th of 100
- Highest elevation: 538 m (1,765 ft)
  - Rank: 6th of 100
- Lowest elevation: 368 m (1,207 ft)
  - Rank: 101st of 100

Population (2026)
  - Total: 2,765
  - Rank: 38th of 100
  - Density: 78.44/km^{2} (203.2/sq mi)
  - Rank: 79th of 100
- Time zone: UTC+1 (CET)
  - Summer (DST): UTC+2 (CEST)
- LAU 2: LU0000505
- Website: weiswampach.lu

Weiswampach, 31/12/2018

Weiswampach (German pronunciation: [ˈvaɪsvampax]; Luxembourgish: Wäiswampech [væːɪ̯sˈvɑmpəɕ] or locally Wäiswampich) is a commune and small town in northern Luxembourg, in the canton of Clervaux.

As of September 2026, the town of Weiswampach, which lies in the north of the commune, has a population of 1,744.

Other towns within the commune include Beiler, Binsfeld, Breidfeld, Holler, and Leithum.

== Geography ==
The commune of Weiswampach is situated in the Ardennes of north Luxembourg. The land is characterized by fields, orchards, and woods. Although it lies partly on a rocky plateau, there is also fertile arable land and pasture.

== History ==
Although many Celtic and Roman remains have been found in the vicinity, it is generally accepted that Weiswampach was formed in the 8th century, because the name, probably derived from the name of the stream through the village, appears for the first time at the time of the Carolingians.

The locality was stained by the killing of Normans in the 8th and 9th centuries, influenced by the increasingly strong Counts of Vianden and related families in the 11th century when it was ravaged by epidemics and wars. The French Revolution marked a turning point for Weiswampach, when it became a municipality governed by a mayor.

It saw its height in 1871, with 1701 inhabitants. Industrialization and agricultural decline, however, were quick to scatter the population. By the 80s, the population had dropped to 850. The improvement of road infrastructure and the creation of subdivisions, among other things, has since caused an increase in population to 1399 people in 2011. With the population increase has come the building of a new school and a new biological treatment plant.

== Demographics ==
Between 2011 and 2021, Weiswampach was the fastest growing commune in Luxembourg.

Historical population

| Year | Pop. | ±% |
|---|---|---|
| 1821 | 1,043 | — |
| 1851 | 1,503 | +44.1% |
| 1871 | 1,701 | +13.2% |
| 1880 | 1,613 | −5.2% |
| 1890 | 1,538 | −4.6% |
| 1900 | 1,534 | −0.3% |
| 1910 | 1,567 | +2.2% |
| 1922 | 1,516 | −3.3% |
| 1930 | 1,404 | −7.4% |

| Year | Pop. | ±% |
|---|---|---|
| 1947 | 1,290 | −8.1% |
| 1960 | 1,093 | −15.3% |
| 1970 | 984 | −10.0% |
| 1981 | 882 | −10.4% |
| 1991 | 976 | +10.7% |
| 2001 | 1,152 | +18.0% |
| 2011 | 1,362 | +18.2% |
| 2021 | 2,225 | +63.4% |

Source: Le Portail des Statistiques du Luxembourg

== Tourism ==
The main road through Weiswampach, with its connections to Belgium, the Netherlands and North-West of Germany, as well as the favorable geographical location, has caused intense transit, which in turn has resulted in the construction of gas stations, hotels and restaurants. There is also a recreation and holiday center containing 65 hectares, with two artificial lakes and 276 campsites in a natural setting, which has greatly contributed to tourism.

== See also ==
- Lancaster Memorial (Luxembourg)
