= Holler, Luxembourg =

Coordinates: 50°07′25″N 6°02′58″E

Holler (German pronunciation: [ˈhɔlɐ]) is a village in the commune of Weiswampach, in northern Luxembourg. As of September 2026, the village had a population of 92.

Many of the houses in the village were built in the 17th and 18th centuries, and have been restored.

== History ==
Holler was first mentioned in a document dating from the year 893.

== Church ==
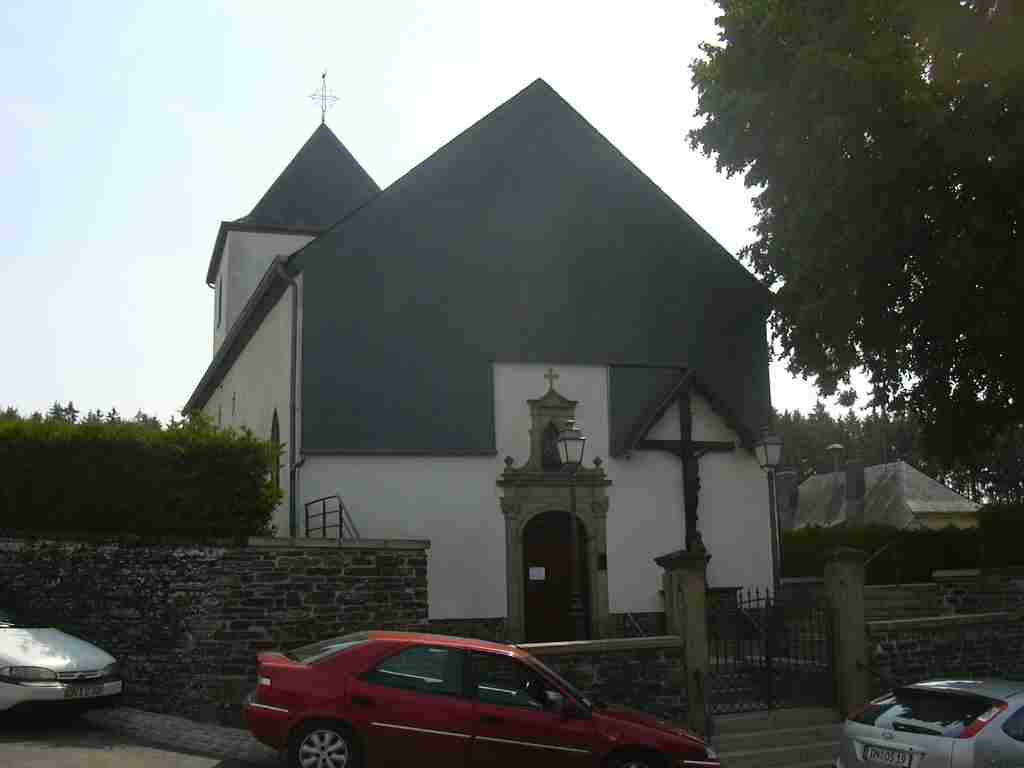
Holler Church

Holler is home to a small 12th century Romanesque-Gothic church. It features high Gothic arches, palm vaulting, and frescoes dating from the 14th century. The church is classified as a historical monument.

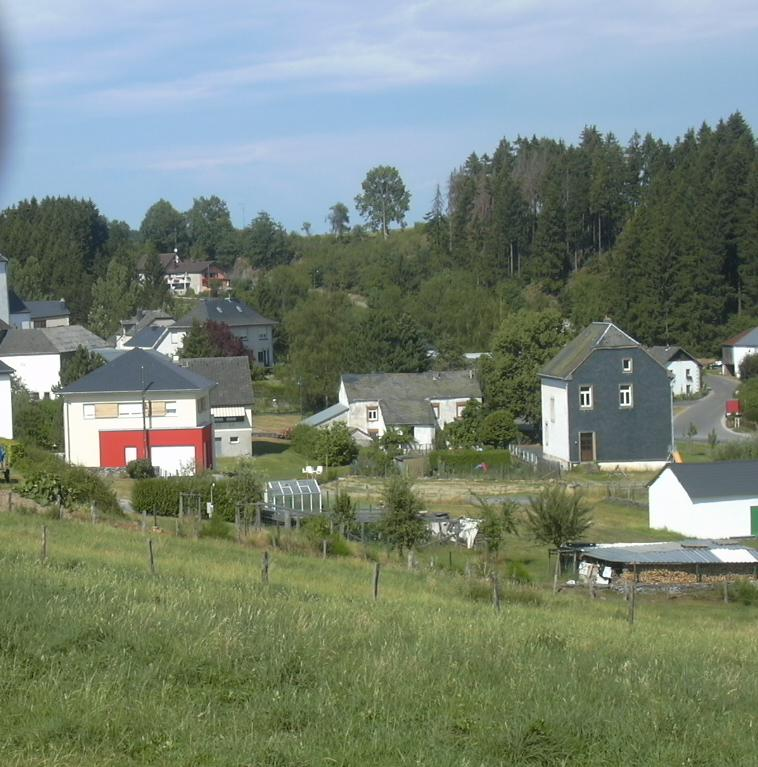

== Economy ==
The economy is dominated by agriculture, mostly potatoes. The seed potatoes are exported as far as Africa.
