= Troine =

Locality in Wincrange, Luxembourg

Troine Tratten (Luxembourgish) Trotten (German)
- Locality
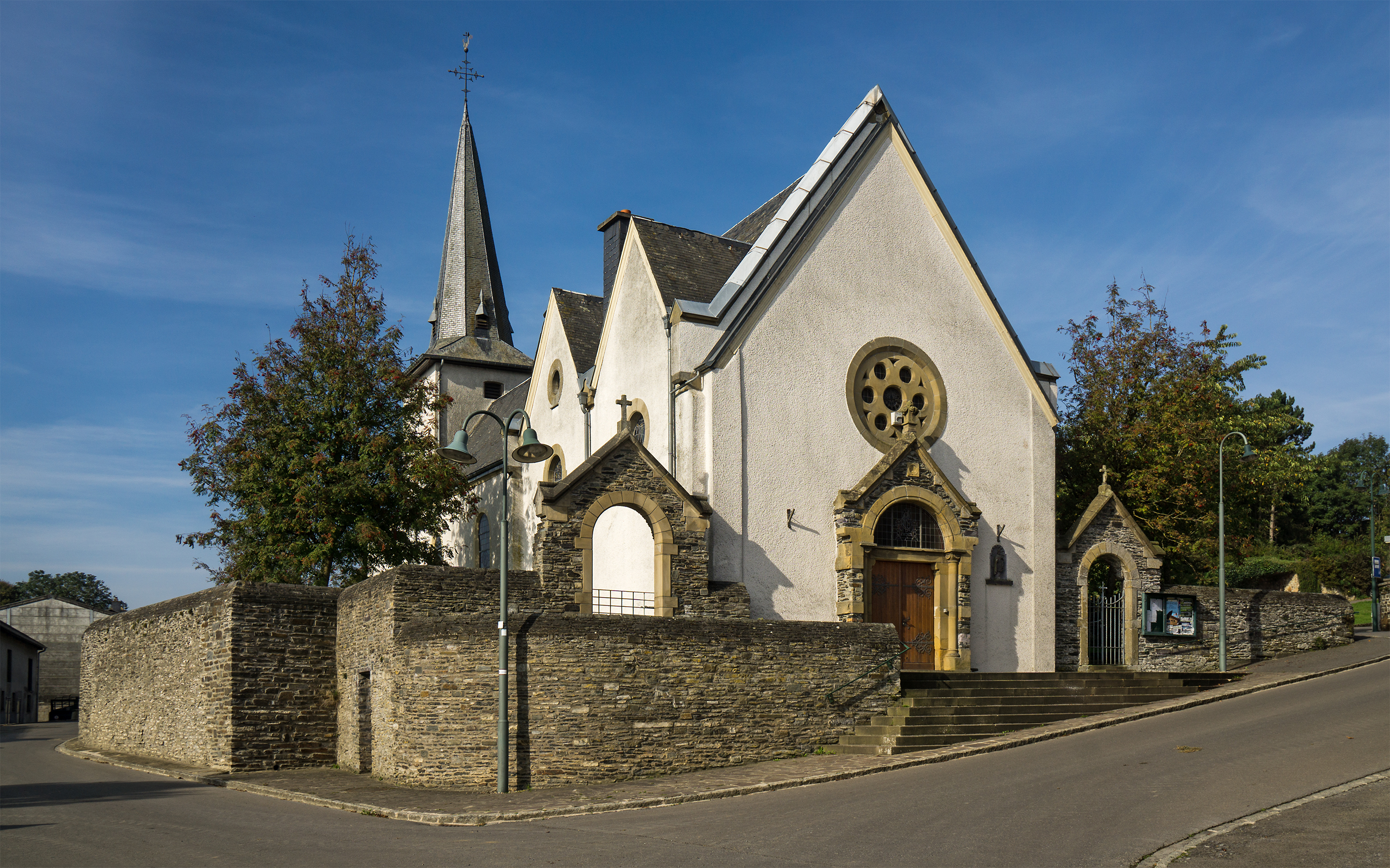
- Church of Saint Sylvester

- Location within Luxembourg
- Coordinates: 50°03′52″N 5°53′08″E
- Country: Luxembourg
- Canton: Clervaux
- Commune: Wincrange

Population
  - Total: 214
- Postal code: L-9982

Troine (French pronunciation: [tʁwan]; Luxembourgish: Tratten; German: Trotten [ˈtʁɔtn̩]) is a village in the commune of Wincrange, in northern Luxembourg. As of September 2026, the village has a population of 245.
