= Wincrange =

Wincrange Wëntger (Luxembourgish) Wintger (German)
- Commune
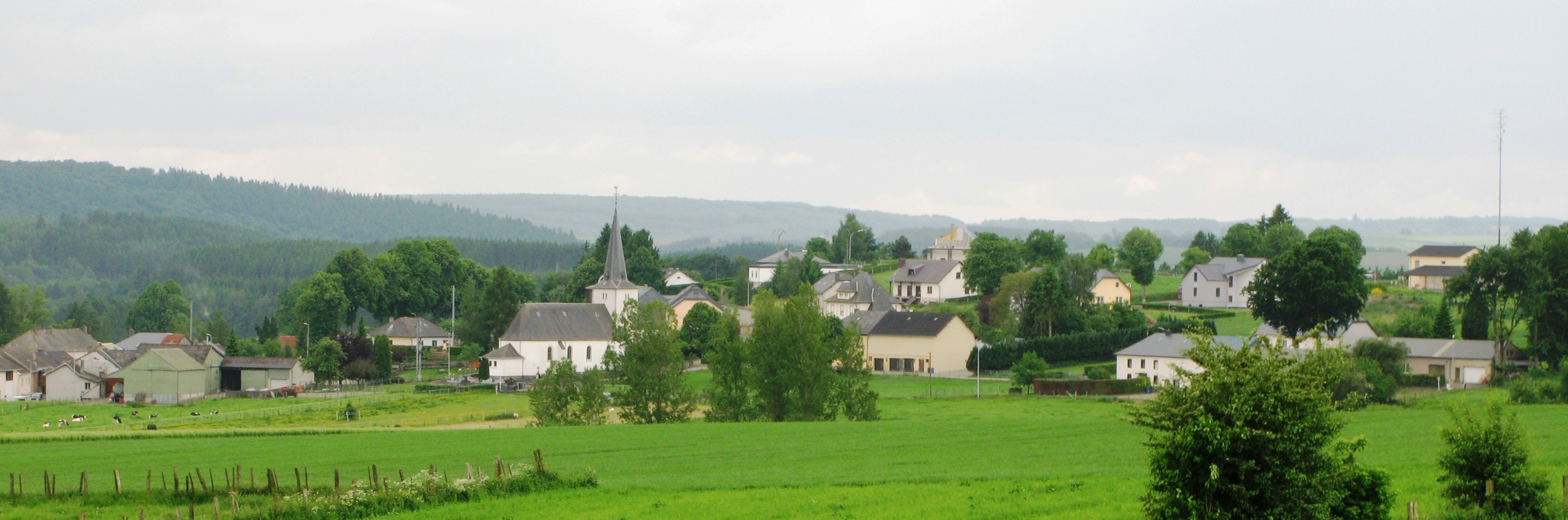

- Coat of arms

- Map of Luxembourg with Wincrange highlighted in orange, and the canton in dark red
- Coordinates: 50.0533°N 5.9144°E
- Country: Luxembourg
- Canton: Clervaux

Government
  - Mayor: Lucien Meyers (CSV)

Area
  - Total: 113.36 km^{2} (43.77 sq mi)
  - Rank: 1st of 100
- Highest elevation: 528 m (1,732 ft)
  - Rank: 11th of 100
- Lowest elevation: 350 m (1,150 ft)
  - Rank: 100th of 100

Population (2026)
  - Total: 5,029
  - Rank: 44th of 100
  - Density: 44.36/km^{2} (114.9/sq mi)
  - Rank: 98th of 100
- Time zone: UTC+1 (CET)
  - Summer (DST): UTC+2 (CEST)
- LAU 2: LU0000502
- Website: wincrange.lu

Wincrange (French pronunciation: [vɛ̃kʁɑ̃ʒ]; Luxembourgish: Wëntger; German: Wintger) is a commune and village in northern Luxembourg, in the canton of Clervaux. The commune is the largest in Luxembourg by geographic area.

Wincrange was formed on 1 January 1978 from the former communes of Asselborn, Boevange, Hachiville, and Oberwampach, all in Clervaux canton. The law creating Wincrange was passed on 31 October 1977.

As of September 2026, the village of Wincrange, which lies in the centre of the commune, has a population of 245.

== Geography ==
=== Climate ===
Wincrange has an oceanic climate (Köppen Cfb). The annual average temperature is 8.8 °C (47.8 °F), the hottest month is July, 17.0 °C (62.6 °F), and the coldest month is January, 1.2 °C (34.2 °F). The annual precipitation is 819.2 millimetres (32.25 in), of which December is the wettest with 90.2 millimetres (3.55 in), while April is the driest with only 48.3 millimetres (1.90 in). The extreme temperature throughout the year ranged from −21.7 °C (−7.1 °F) on December 24, 2001 to 37.9 °C (100.2 °F) on July 25, 2019.

Climate data for Wincrange (Asselborn), 1991-2020 normals
Month	Jan	Feb	Mar	Apr	May	Jun	Jul	Aug	Sep	Oct	Nov	Dec	Year
Record high °C (°F)	12.5 (54.5)	20.3 (68.5)	21.9 (71.4)	23.3 (73.9)	29.6 (85.3)	33.4 (92.1)	37.9 (100.2)	36.5 (97.7)	32.4 (90.3)	26.9 (80.4)	20.4 (68.7)	13.7 (56.7)	37.9 (100.2)
Mean daily maximum °C (°F)	3.2 (37.8)	4.4 (39.9)	8.7 (47.7)	13.2 (55.8)	17.3 (63.1)	20.4 (68.7)	22.5 (72.5)	22.2 (72.0)	18.0 (64.4)	12.8 (55.0)	7.1 (44.8)	3.9 (39.0)	12.8 (55.0)
Daily mean °C (°F)	1.2 (34.2)	1.7 (35.1)	4.7 (40.5)	8.4 (47.1)	12.1 (53.8)	15.2 (59.4)	17.0 (62.6)	16.5 (61.7)	12.8 (55.0)	9.0 (48.2)	4.7 (40.5)	2.0 (35.6)	8.8 (47.8)
Mean daily minimum °C (°F)	−1.5 (29.3)	−1.5 (29.3)	0.7 (33.3)	3.2 (37.8)	7.0 (44.6)	9.9 (49.8)	11.8 (53.2)	11.4 (52.5)	8.4 (47.1)	5.7 (42.3)	2.2 (36.0)	−0.5 (31.1)	4.7 (40.5)
Record low °C (°F)	−19.7 (−3.5)	−18.4 (−1.1)	−17.6 (0.3)	−7.2 (19.0)	−2.7 (27.1)	−2.5 (27.5)	3.2 (37.8)	0.8 (33.4)	−0.4 (31.3)	−7.4 (18.7)	−14.1 (6.6)	−21.7 (−7.1)	−21.7 (−7.1)
Average precipitation mm (inches)	74.9 (2.95)	61.0 (2.40)	59.7 (2.35)	48.3 (1.90)	68.2 (2.69)	70.5 (2.78)	64.9 (2.56)	80.6 (3.17)	63.7 (2.51)	67.5 (2.66)	69.7 (2.74)	90.2 (3.55)	819.2 (32.25)
Average precipitation days (≥ 1.0 mm)	12.8	11.2	11.0	9.1	10.3	10.4	10.2	10.3	9.4	11.5	12.9	13.8	132.7
Source: NOAA

=== Populated places ===
The commune consists of the following villages:

Asselborn Section:

- Asselborn
- Boxhorn
- Maulusmühle
- Rumlange
- Sassel
- Stockem
- Uschler
- Lentzweiler^{a}
- Asselborn-Moulin (lieu-dit)
- Emeschbach-Asselborn (lieu-dit)
- Emeschbach-Stockem (lieu-dit)
- Bockmühle (lieu-dit)
- Cinqfontaines (lieu-dit)
- Asselborn-Route (lieu-dit)
- Stockem-Route (lieu-dit)

Boevange Section:

- Boevange
- Deiffelt
- Doennange
- Hamiville
- Crendal
- Lullange
- Troine
- Wincrange
- Lentzweiler^{b}
- Hinterhasselt (lieu-dit)
- Antoniushof (lieu-dit)
- Troine-Route (lieu-dit)

Hachiville Section:

- Hachiville
- Hoffelt
- Weiler
- Neumühle
- Lehresmühle
- Moulin-Neuf (lieu-dit)

Oberwampach Section:

- Allerborn
- Brachtenbach
- Derenbach
- Niederwampach
- Schimpach
- Oberwampach
- Birkenhof (lieu-dit)
- Buschweg (lieu-dit)
- Schimpach-Station (lieu-dit)

Notes:
^{a} - partly shared with the former commune of Boevange
^{b} - partly shared with the former commune of Asselborn

== Notable people ==
- Johan Caspar von Cicignon (ca 1625 in Oberwampach - 1696), a soldier and military engineer who spent most of his career with Denmark–Norway.

== Population ==
Historical population

Year	Pop.	±%
1821	2,542	—
1851	4,406	+73.3%
1900	4,671	+6.0%
1910	4,868	+4.2%
1922	4,693	−3.6%
1935	4,358	−7.1%

Year	Pop.	±%
1947	3,886	−10.8%
1960	3,299	−15.1%
1970	2,985	−9.5%
1981	2,633	−11.8%
1990	2,725	+3.5%
2000	3,176	+16.6%

Year	Pop.	±%
2005	3,542	+11.5%
2010	3,729	+5.3%
2015	4,099	+9.9%
2020	4,503	+9.9%
2021	4,574	+1.6%

Source data
