= Johan Caspar von Cicignon =

Luxembourg-born soldier and military engineer

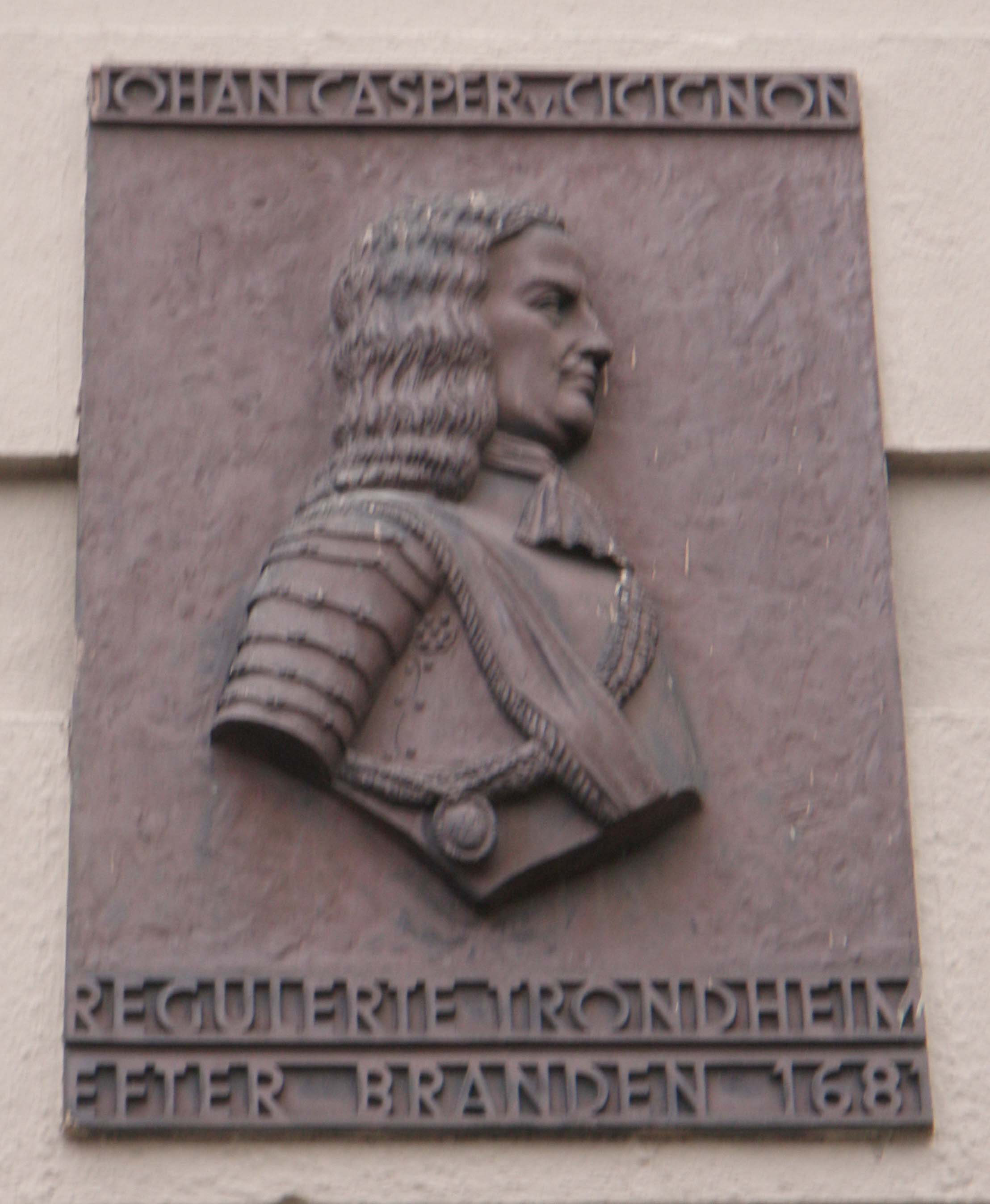
- Commemorative plaque to Cicignon on the wall of Trondheim Town Hall.
- Born: c. 1625; Oberwampach, Luxembourg
- Died: 1696; Fredrikstad, Norway
- Military career
- Allegiance: Denmark–Norway
- Rank: Major General
- Commands: Bergenhus Fortress

Johan Caspar von Cicignon (c. 1625 – 12 December 1696) was a Luxembourg-born soldier and military engineer who spent most of his career in the service of Denmark–Norway. He is most associated with the reconstruction of Trondheim, Norway after the great fire of 1681.

== Biography ==
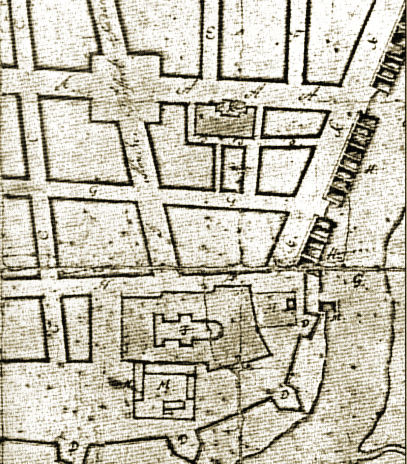
Section of Cicigon's city plan for Trondheim, after the great fire of 1681

Johan Caspar von Cicignon was born in Oberwampach, a village in the commune of Wincrange, in northern Luxembourg. He was the son of Georg Friedrich de Cicignon til Mechern og Oberwampach and Marie de Lachen dite Wampach. Dating from 1657, he was in the Venetian military service. In 1662 he entered the Danish-Norwegian service and rose to the position of Major General. He became commandant at the Bergenhus Fortress in early 1664. As such he was involved in the Battle of Vågen in 1665, when an English flotilla attacked a Dutch treasure fleet sheltering in the bay of Bergen.

During the Scanian War from 1675 to 1679, he served first in Mecklenburg, where he distinguished himself at the siege of Wismar in 1675. Cicignon was commander in Fredrikstad and engaged in the Battle of Rügen in autumn 1677.

A fire in Trondheim on 19 April 1681 (Hornemansbrannen) led to an almost total reconstruction of the city. Johan Caspar von Cicignon laid out plans for the reconstruction of Trondheim and fortifications. Kristiansten Fortress was built after his plans. Cicignon's baroque style is still used as a guideline in much of Trondheim's city centre and in later years there have been quite the debate over whether or not the plan's intentions are being stretched by entrepreneurs trying to profit from infringing the plan's strict building boundaries.

== Honours ==
In 1686 he was appointed Knight of the Order of the Dannebrog. Monuments for Cicignon can be found in both Oberwampach and Trondheim.

== Personal life ==
Cicignon lived his later years on his farm Trosvik in Fredrikstad. He was married to Anne Sophie von Hagedorn (1636–1690) and they had a son Frederik Christoph de Cicignon (1667–1719) who became a major general and was commander of the Fredrikstad Fortress. Johan Caspar von Cicignon was also the grandfather of Ulrik Frederik de Cicignon (1698–1772) who was sheriff in Bergen during the Strilekrigen in 1765.

== Kristiansten Fortress ==
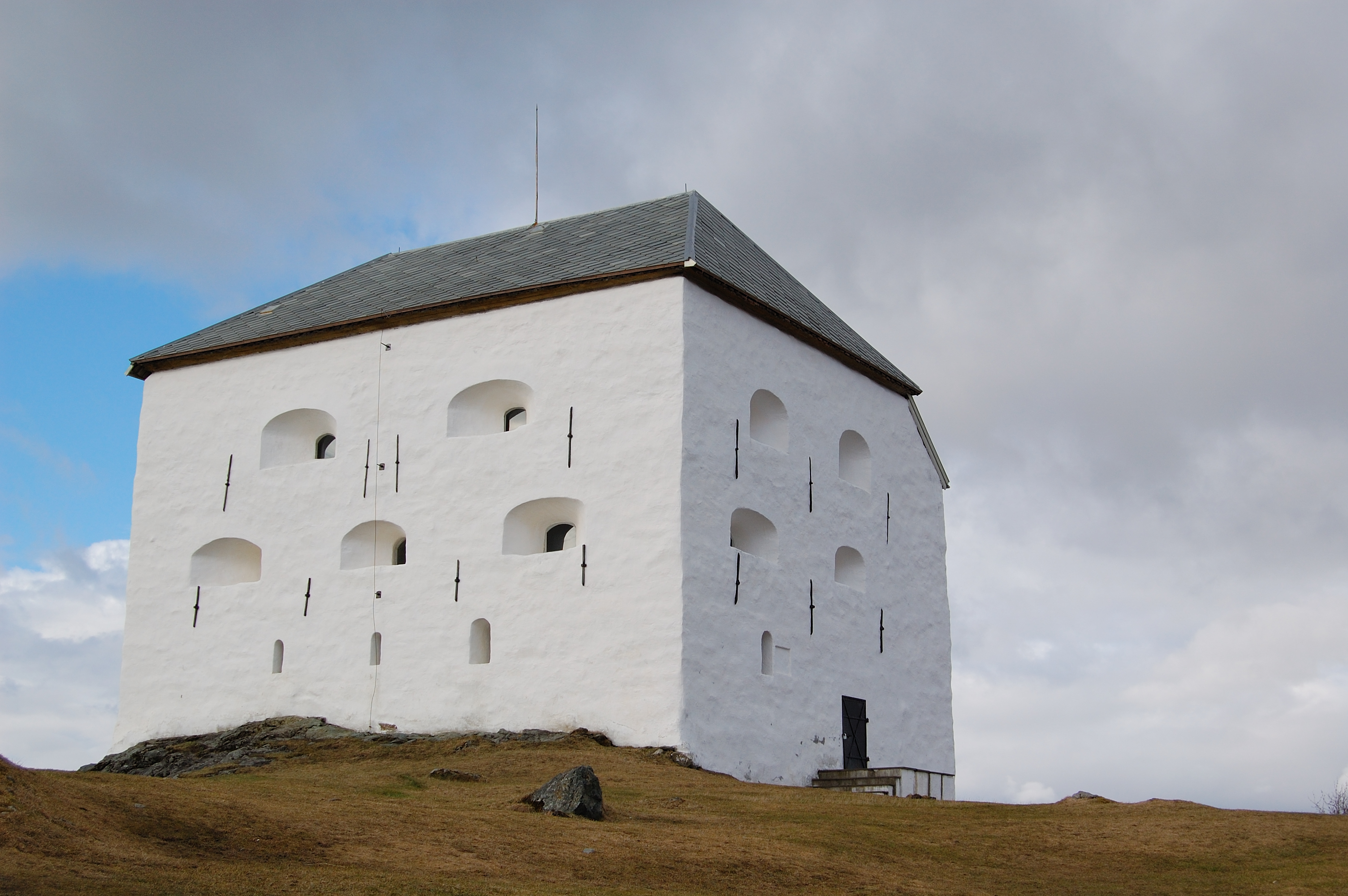
The defensive tower - donjonen.

Cicignon made the plans for the construction of Kristiansten Fortress in Trondheim in 1681–1685. It was built after the city fire of Trondheim in 1681 to protect the city against attack from the east. Construction was finished in 1685. It fulfilled its purpose in 1718 when Swedish forces laid siege against Trondheim. The fortress was decommissioned in 1816 by king Charles XIV John.
