= Brachtenbach =

Coordinates: 50°01′N 5°55′E

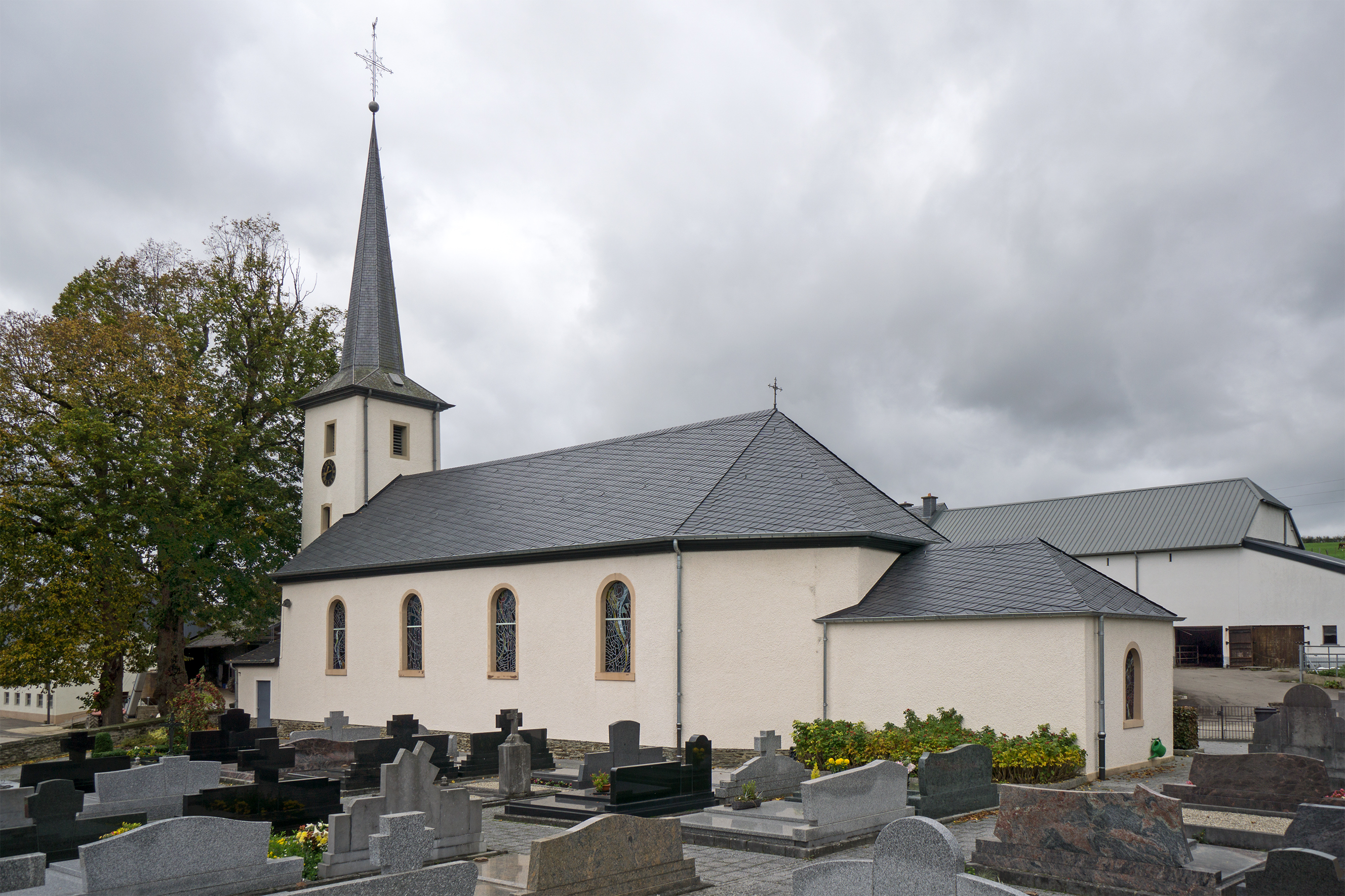
Church of Brachtenbach

Brachtenbach (German pronunciation: [ˈbʁaxtn̩ˌbax]; Luxembourgish: Bruechtebaach) is a village in the commune of Wincrange, in northern Luxembourg. As of September 2026, the village had a population of 278.
