= Hamiville =

Coordinates: 50°03′N 5°54′E

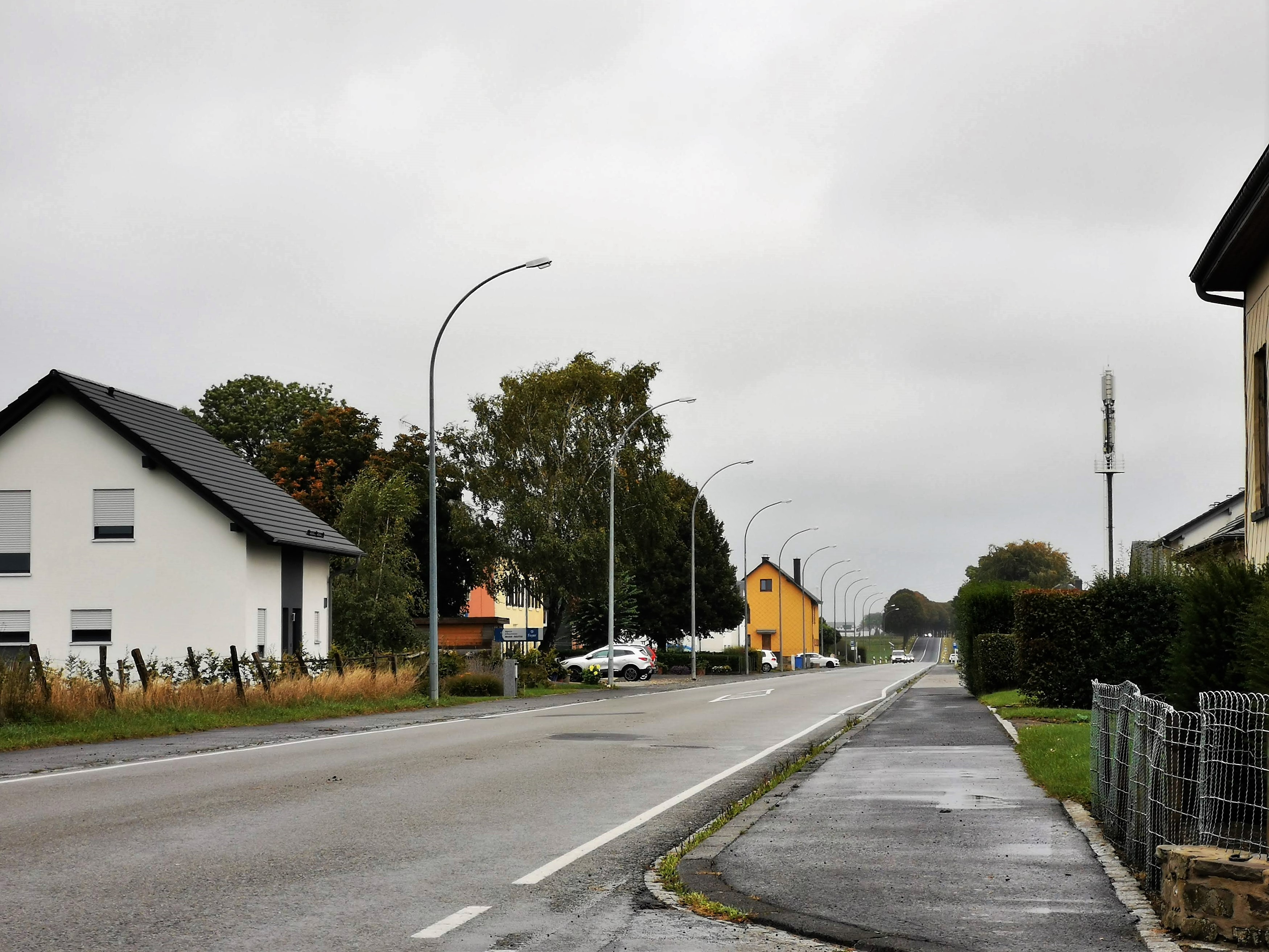
Street of Hamiville

Hamiville (French pronunciation: [amivil]; German: Heisdorf [ˈhaɪsdɔʁf]; Luxembourgish: Heesdref) is a village in the commune of Wincrange, in northern Luxembourg. As of September 2026, the village has a population of 209.
