= Boxhorn =

Coordinates: 50.05°N 5.60°E

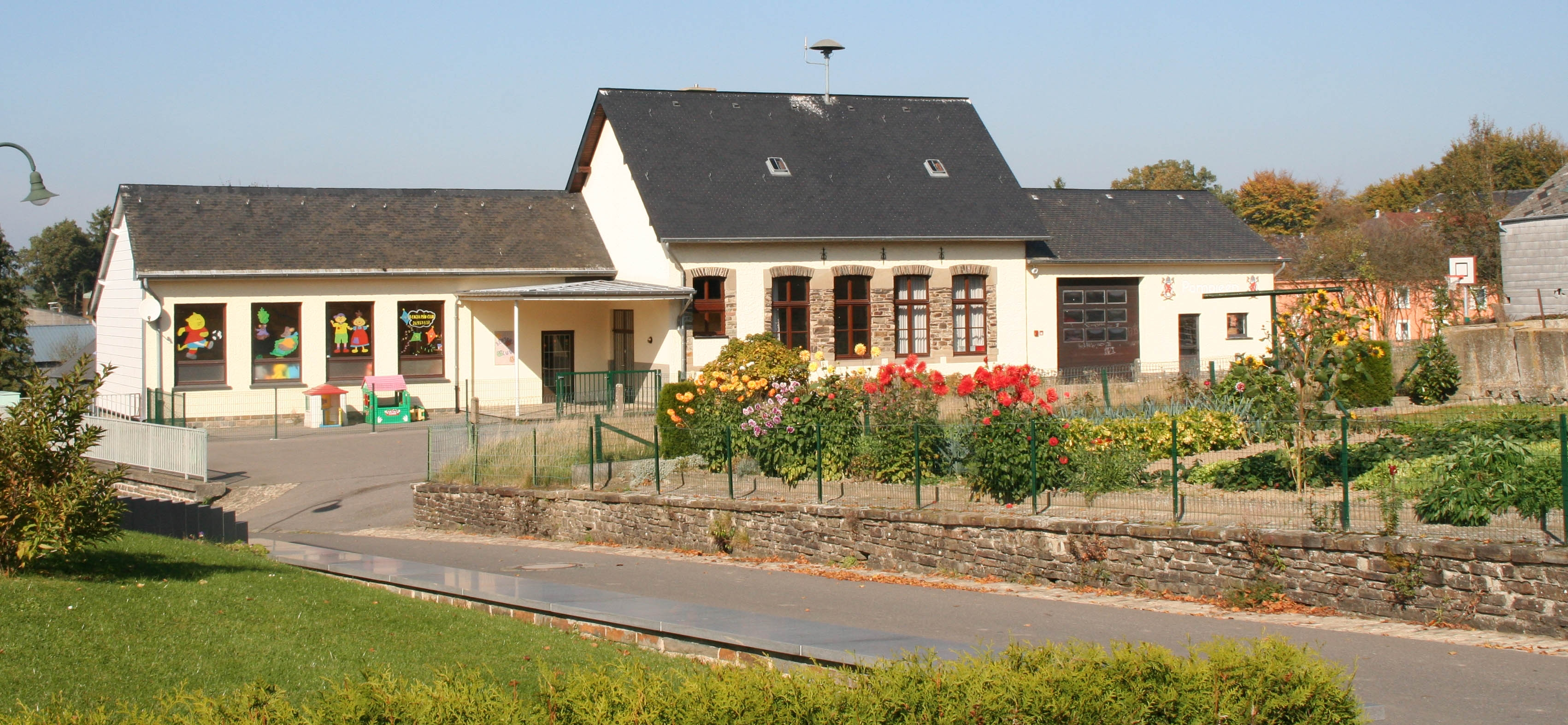

Boxhorn (German pronunciation: [ˈbɔksˌhɔʁn]; Luxembourgish: Boxer) is a village in the commune of Wincrange, canton of Clervaux, district of Diekirch in northern Luxembourg. As of September 2026, the village had a population of 455.
