= Lullange =

Coordinates: 50°04′N 5°57′E

Lullange (French pronunciation: [lylɑ̃ʒ]; Luxembourgish: Lëllgen, German: Lullingen [ˈlʊlɪŋən]) is a village in the commune of Wincrange, in northern Luxembourg. As of September 2026, the village had a population of 140.
