= Derenbach =

Coordinates: 50°01′N 5°53′E

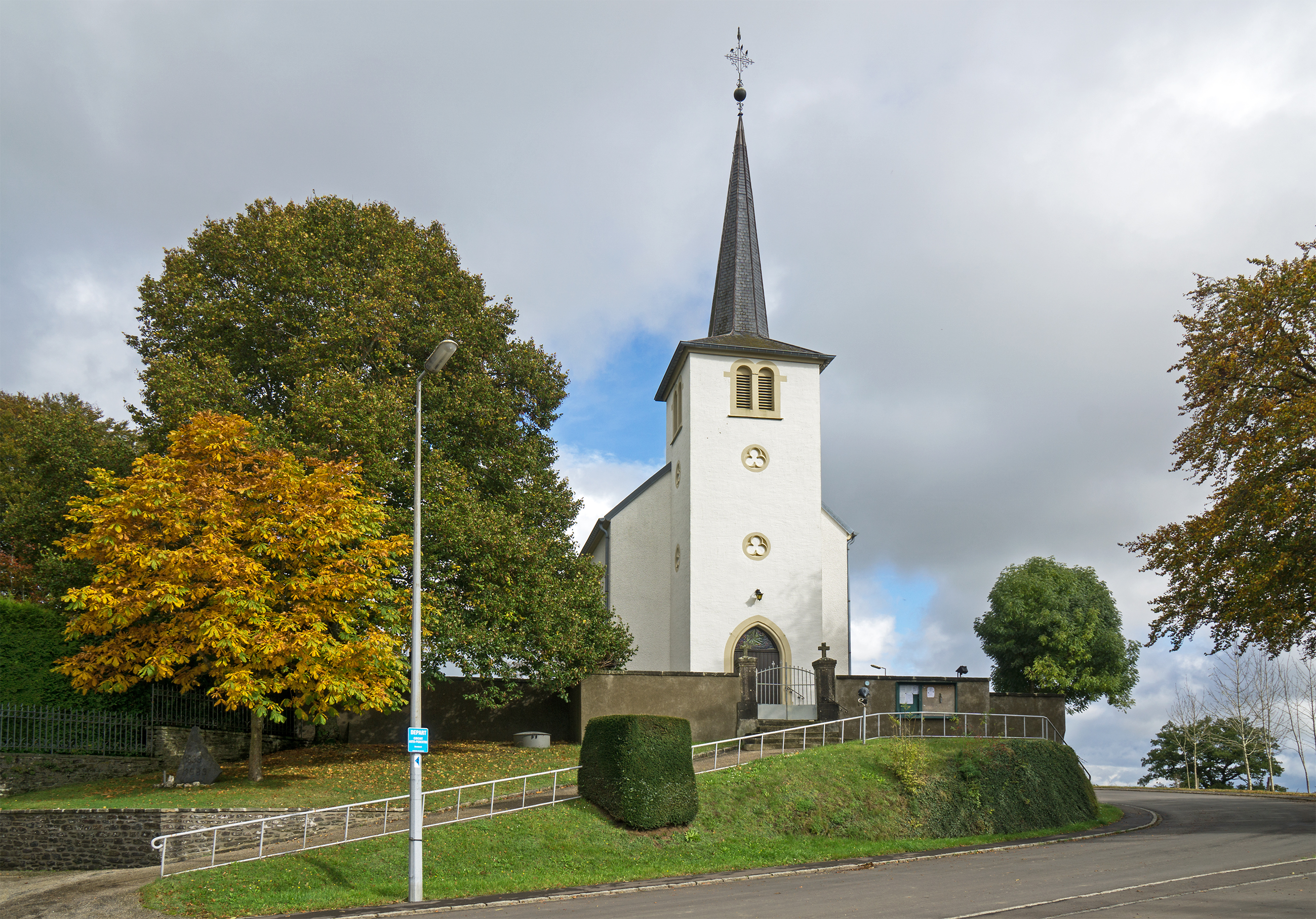

Derenbach (German pronunciation: [ˈdeːʁənbax]; Luxembourgish: Déierbech) is a small town in the commune of Wincrange, in northern Luxembourg. As of September 2026, the town has a population of 351.
