= Stockem =

Coordinates: 50°05′N 5°57′E

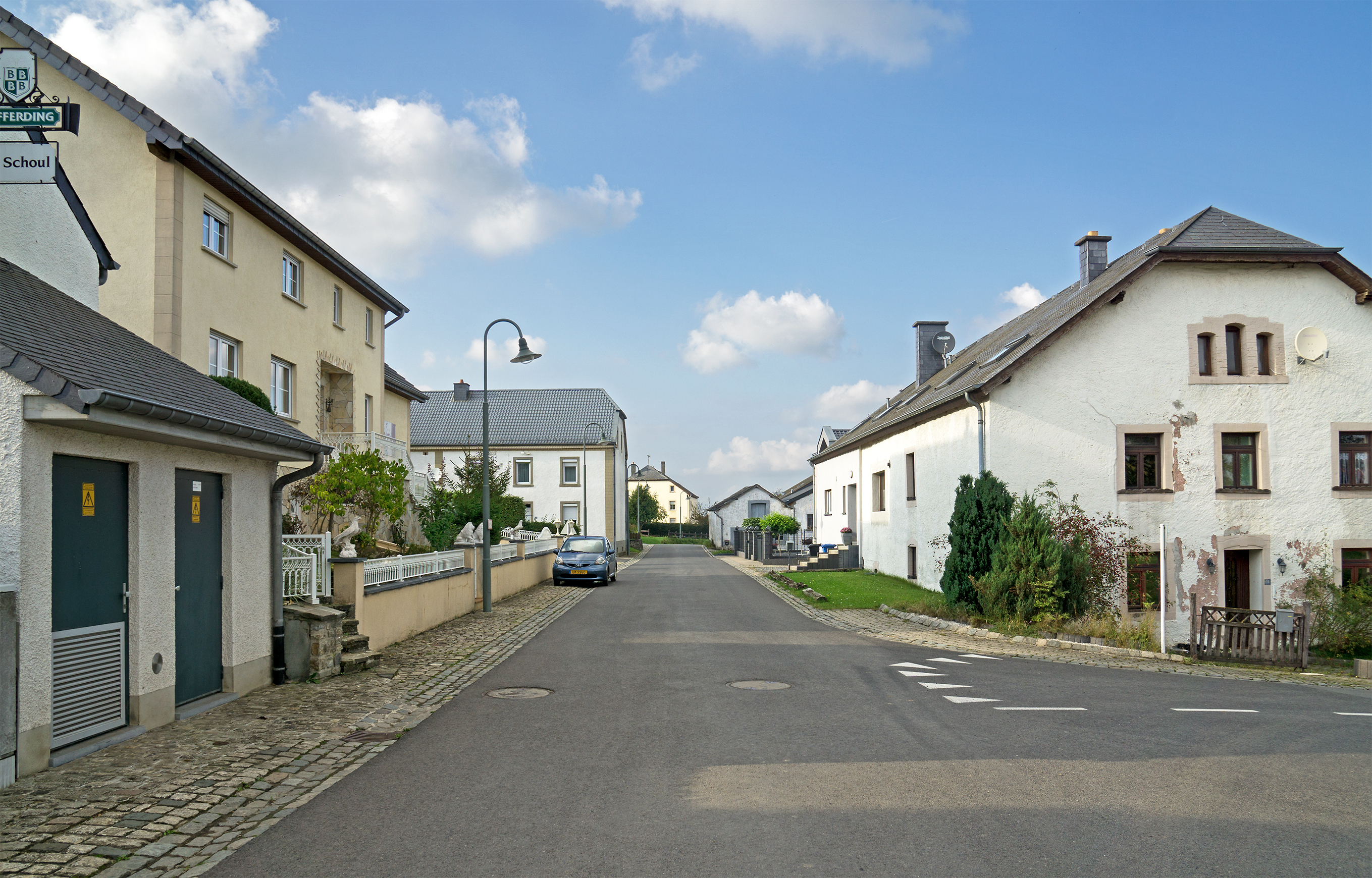

Stockem (Luxembourgish: Stackem [ˈʃtɑkəm]) is a village in the commune of Wincrange, in northern Luxembourg. As of September 2026, the village has a population of 133.

== Church ==
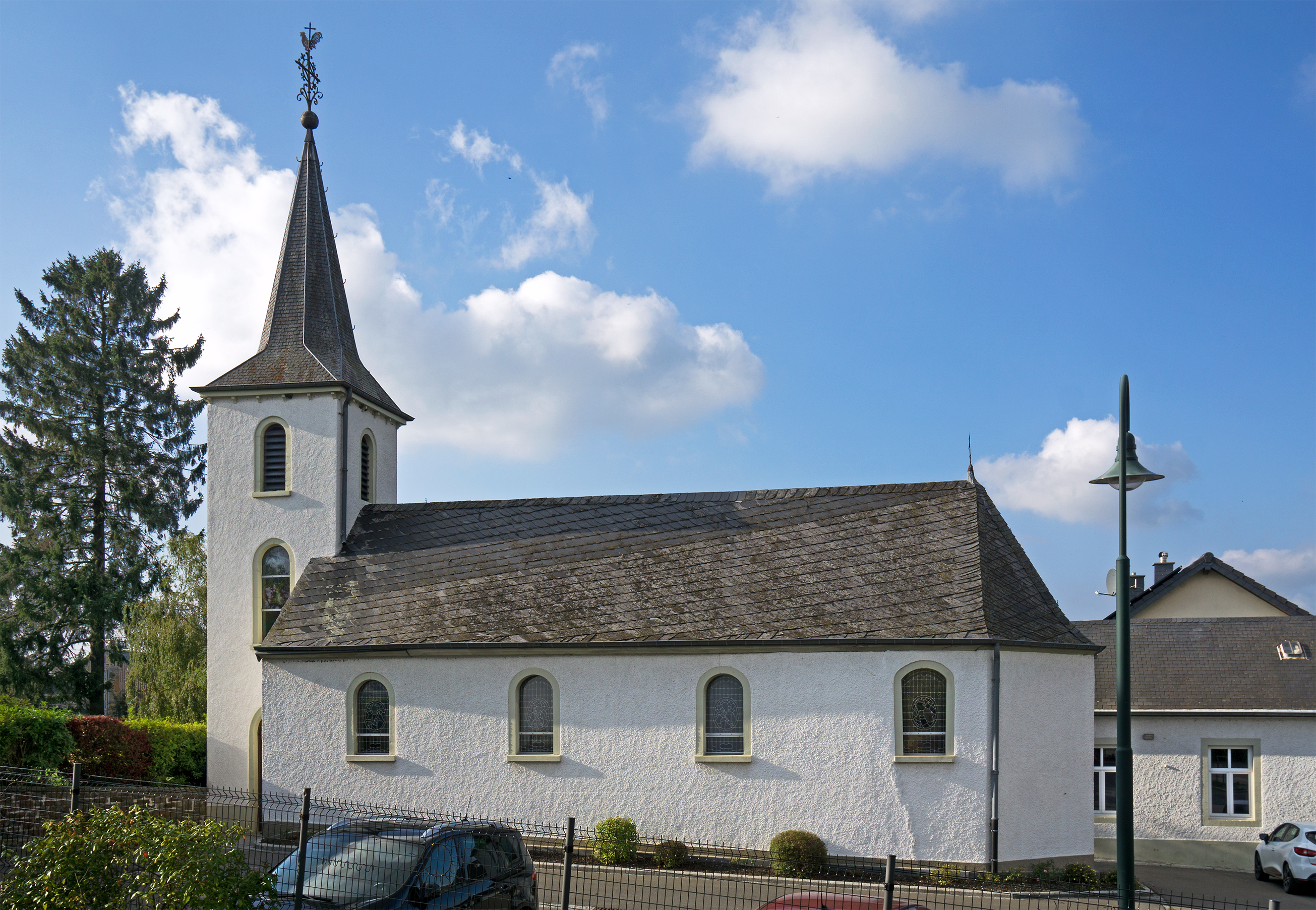
Kapelle Stockem

The Catholic chapel is located on the main street in the center of town. It is dedicated to the Holy Cross, and its feast takes place on September 14.
