= Weiler, Wincrange =

Coordinates: 49.962°N 6.123°E

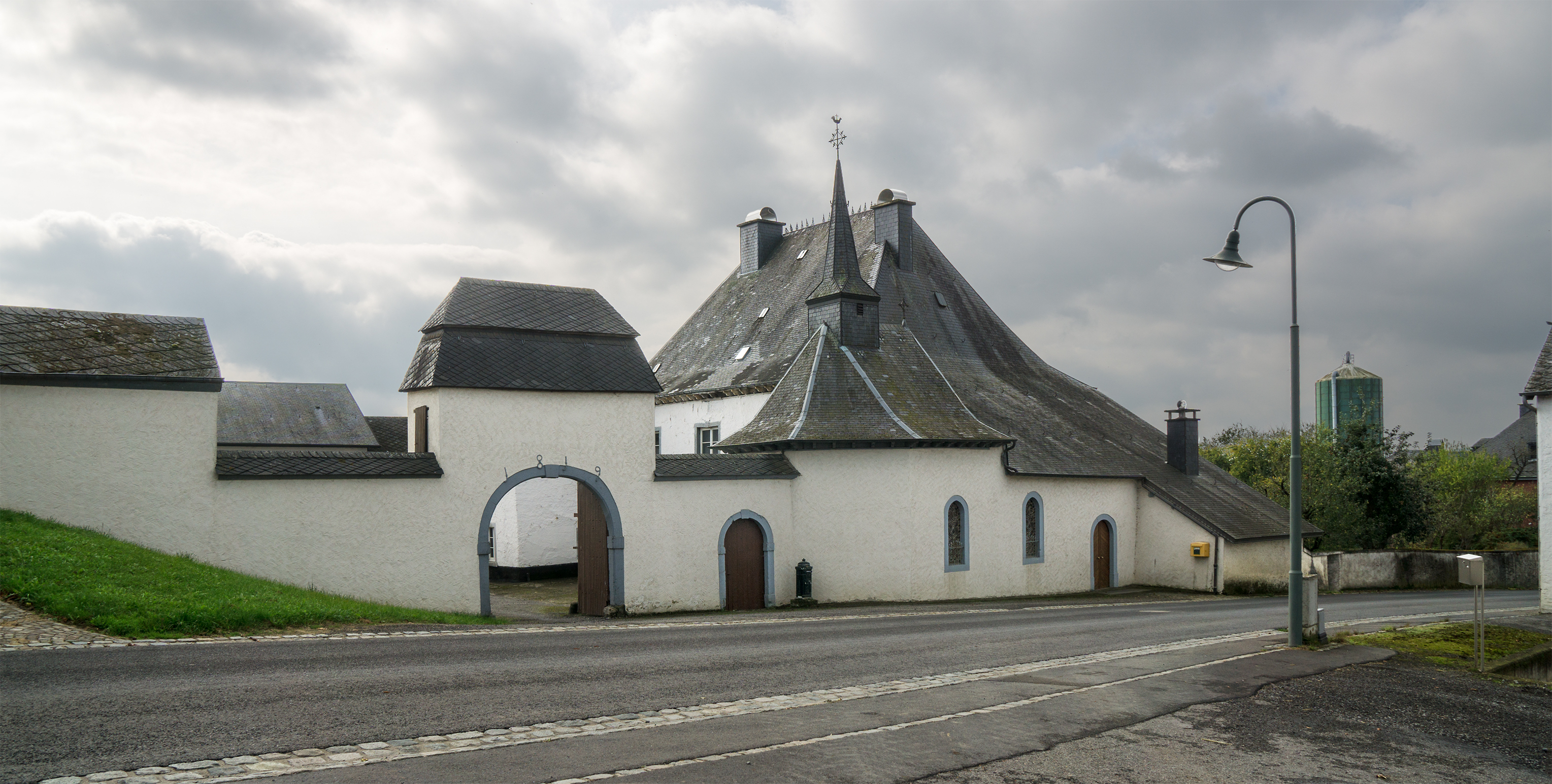
Weiler chapel

Weiler (German pronunciation: [ˈvaɪlɐ]; Luxembourgish: Weiler or Weller [ˈvælɐ]) is a village in the commune of Wincrange, in northern Luxembourg. As of September 2026, the village has a population of 58.
