= Deiffelt =

Village in Luxembourg

Coordinates: 50°04′N 5°58′E

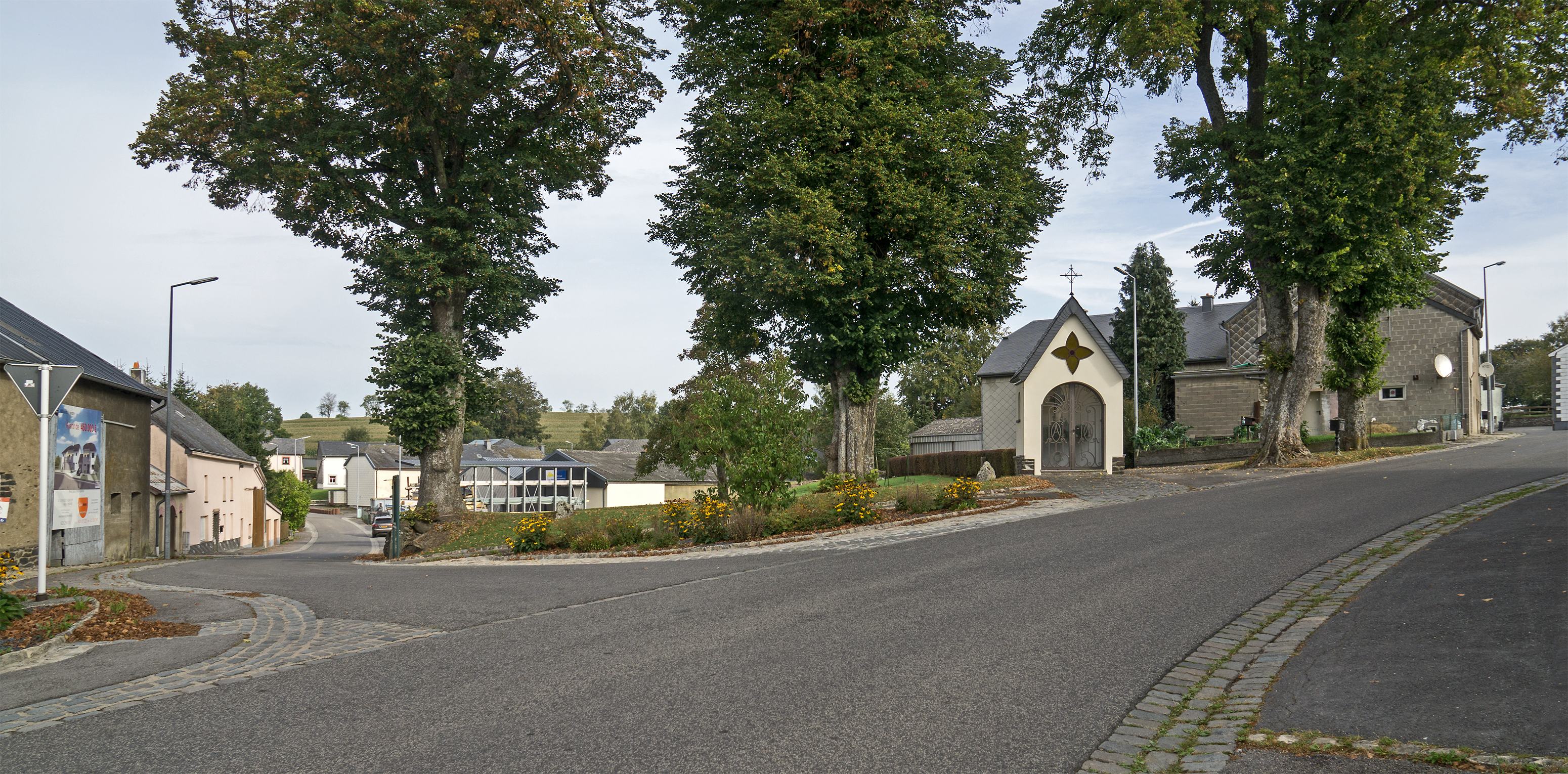
Main road in Deiffelt

Deiffelt (Luxembourgish: Deewelt) is a little village in the commune of Wincrange, in northern Luxembourg. As of September 2026, the village has a population of 140.
