= Hoffelt =

Coordinates: 50°06′N 5°55′E

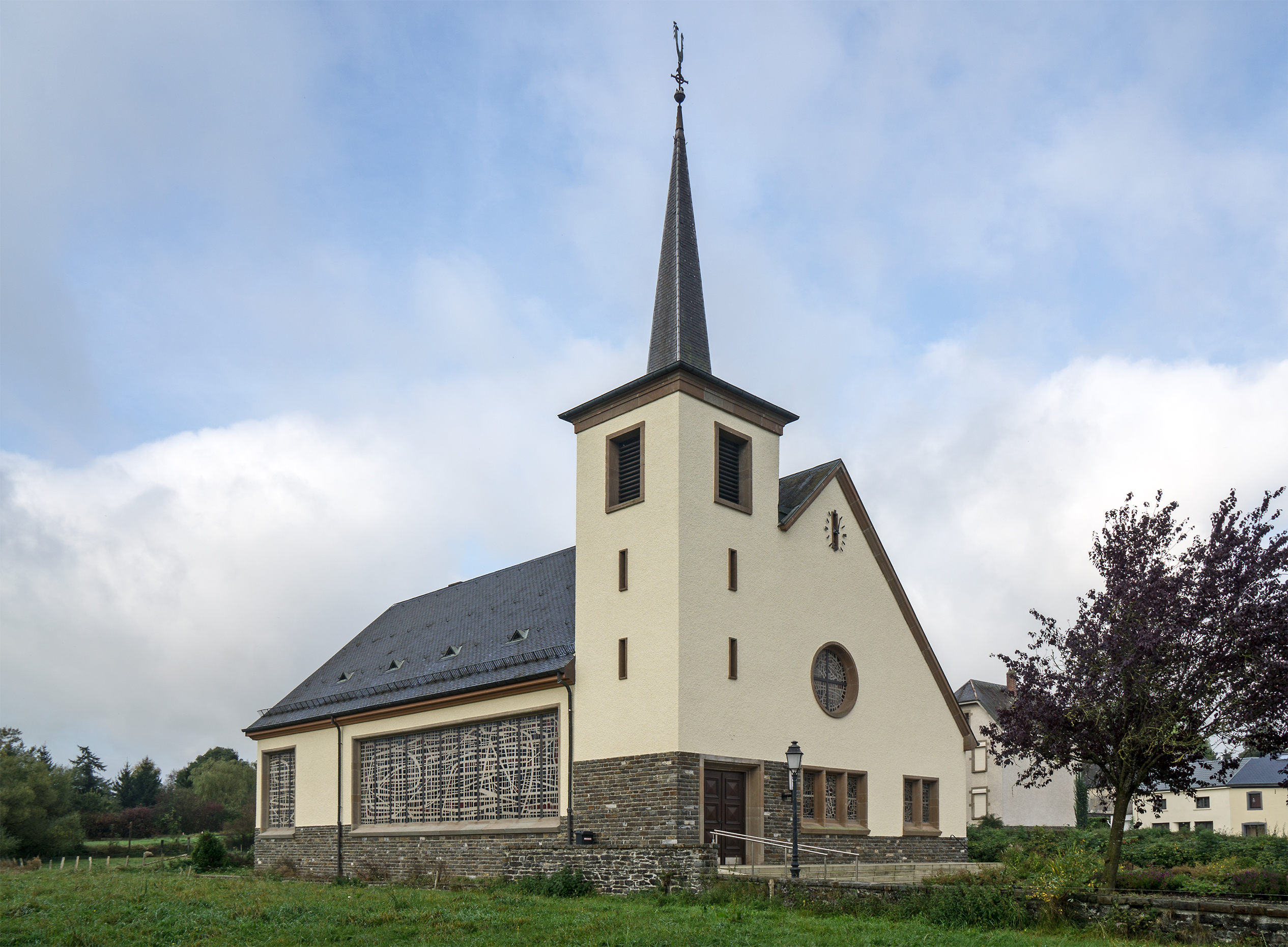
Church of Hoffelt

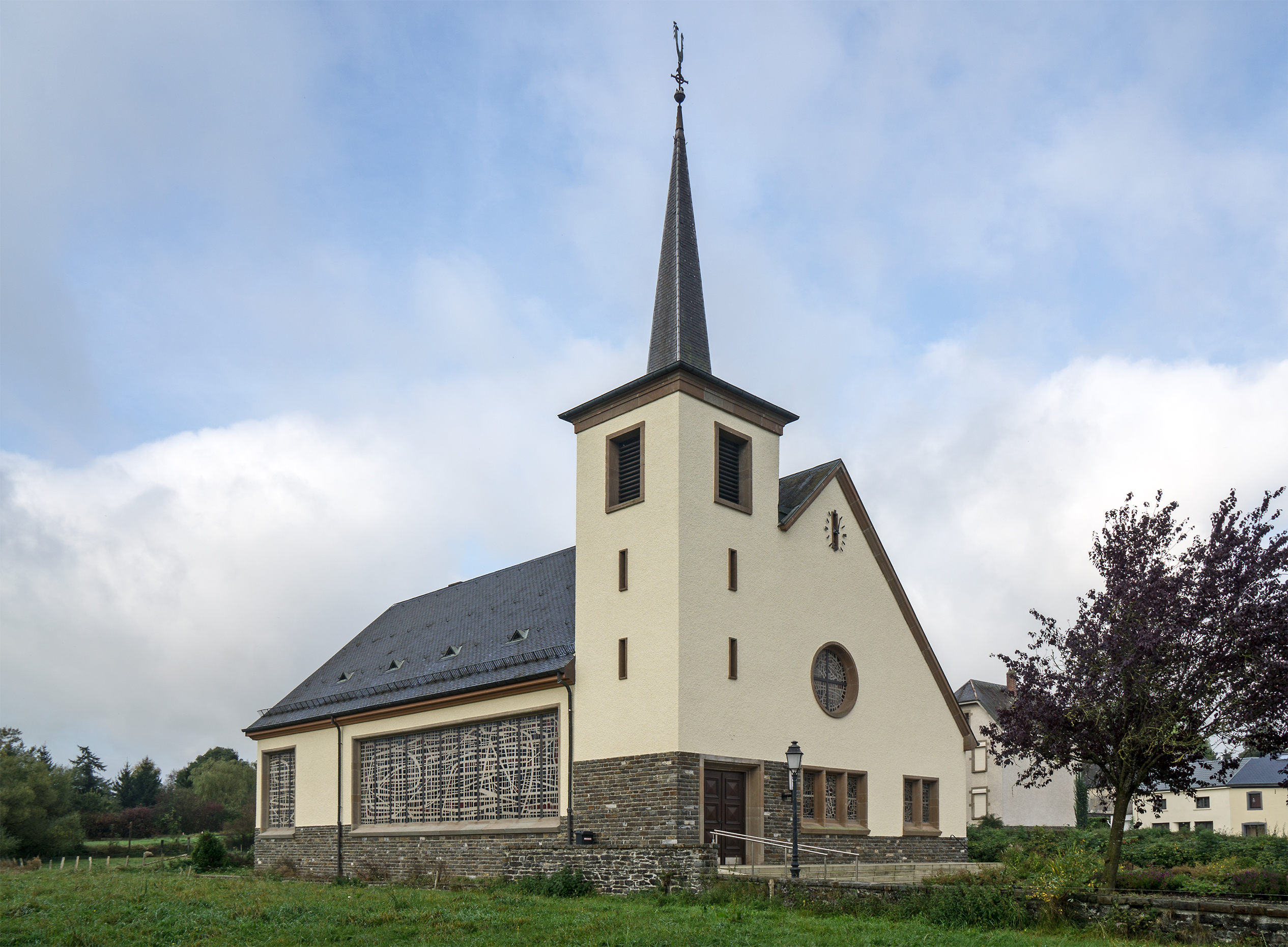
Kirche Hoffelt 01

Hoffelt (Luxembourgish: Houfelt) is a small village in the commune of Wincrange, in northern Luxembourg. As of September 2026, the town had a population of 379.
