= Binsfeld, Luxembourg =

Coordinates: 50°07′N 6°02′E

Binsfeld
- Village
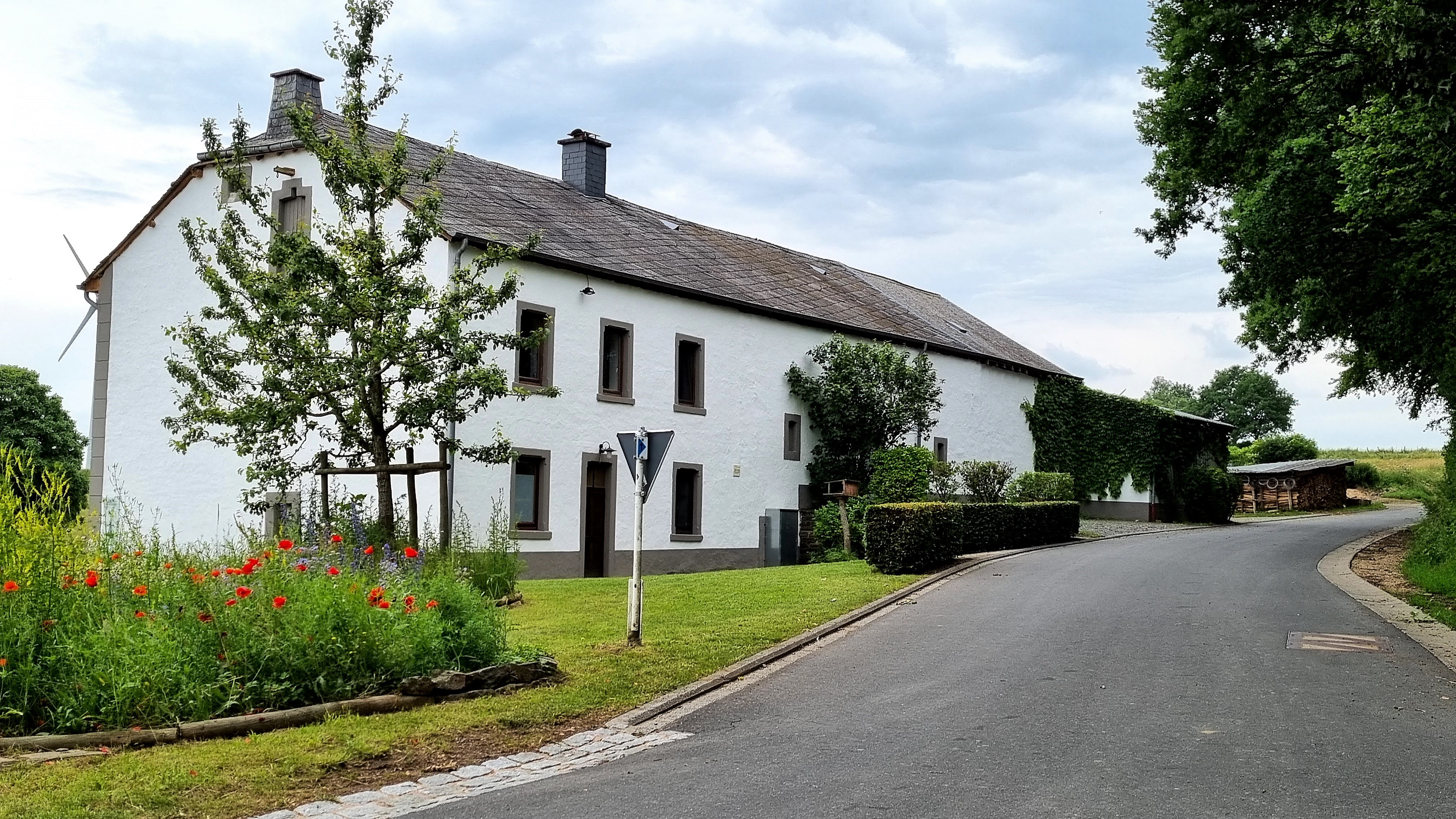
- Country: Luxembourg
- Province: Weiswampach

Population
  - Total: 354

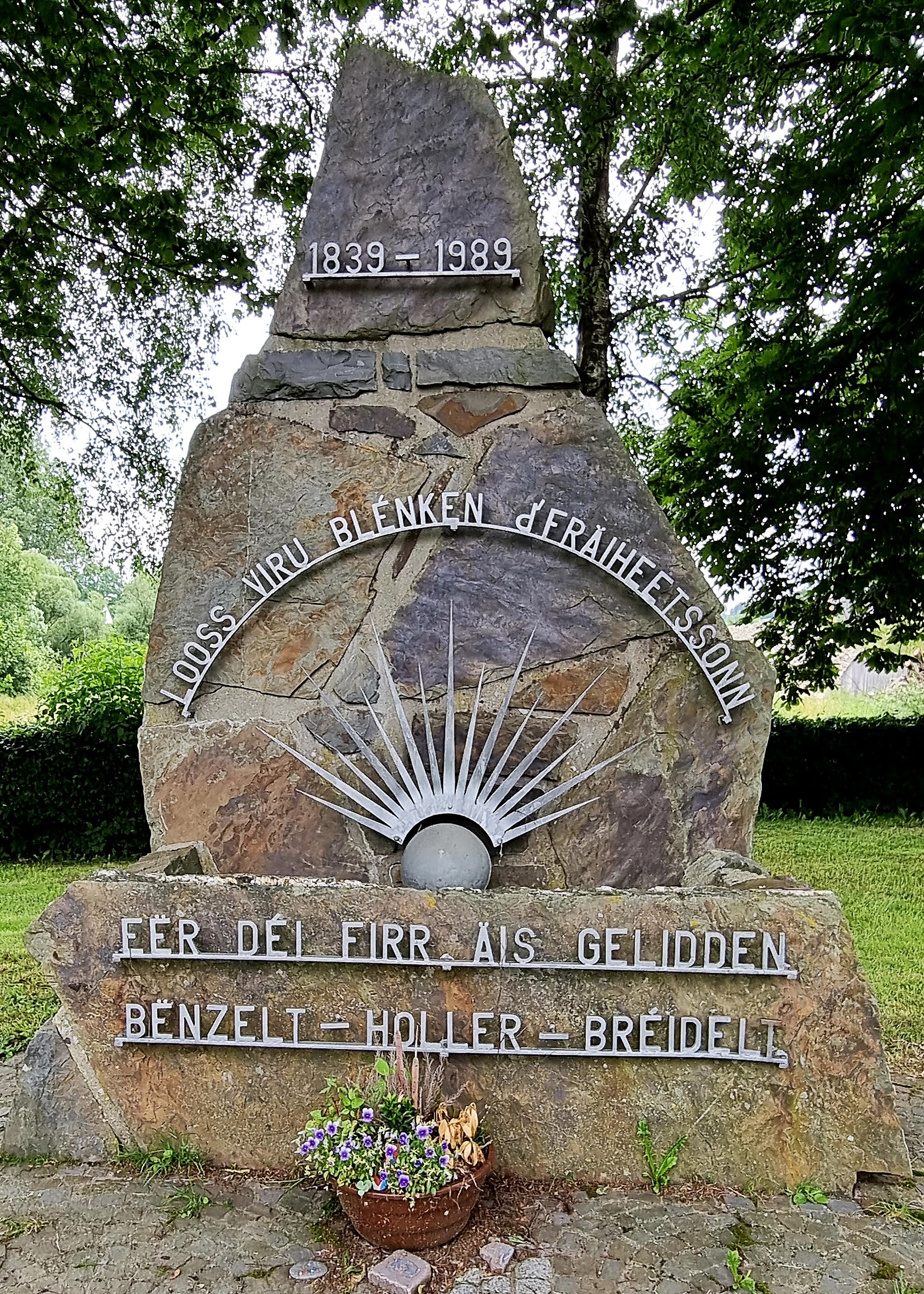
Monument commemorating 150 years of Luxembourg's independence

Binsfeld (German pronunciation: [ˈbɪnsfɛlt]; Luxembourgish: Bënzelt) is a village in the commune of Weiswampach, in northern Luxembourg. As of September 2026, the village had a population of 359.

== History ==
The discovery of an extended field of Roman tombs in the early 1970s has confirmed the existence of Roman colonies in the neighbourhood of Binsfeld. Artifacts from the tombs can be seen at the History Museum in the City of Luxembourg.

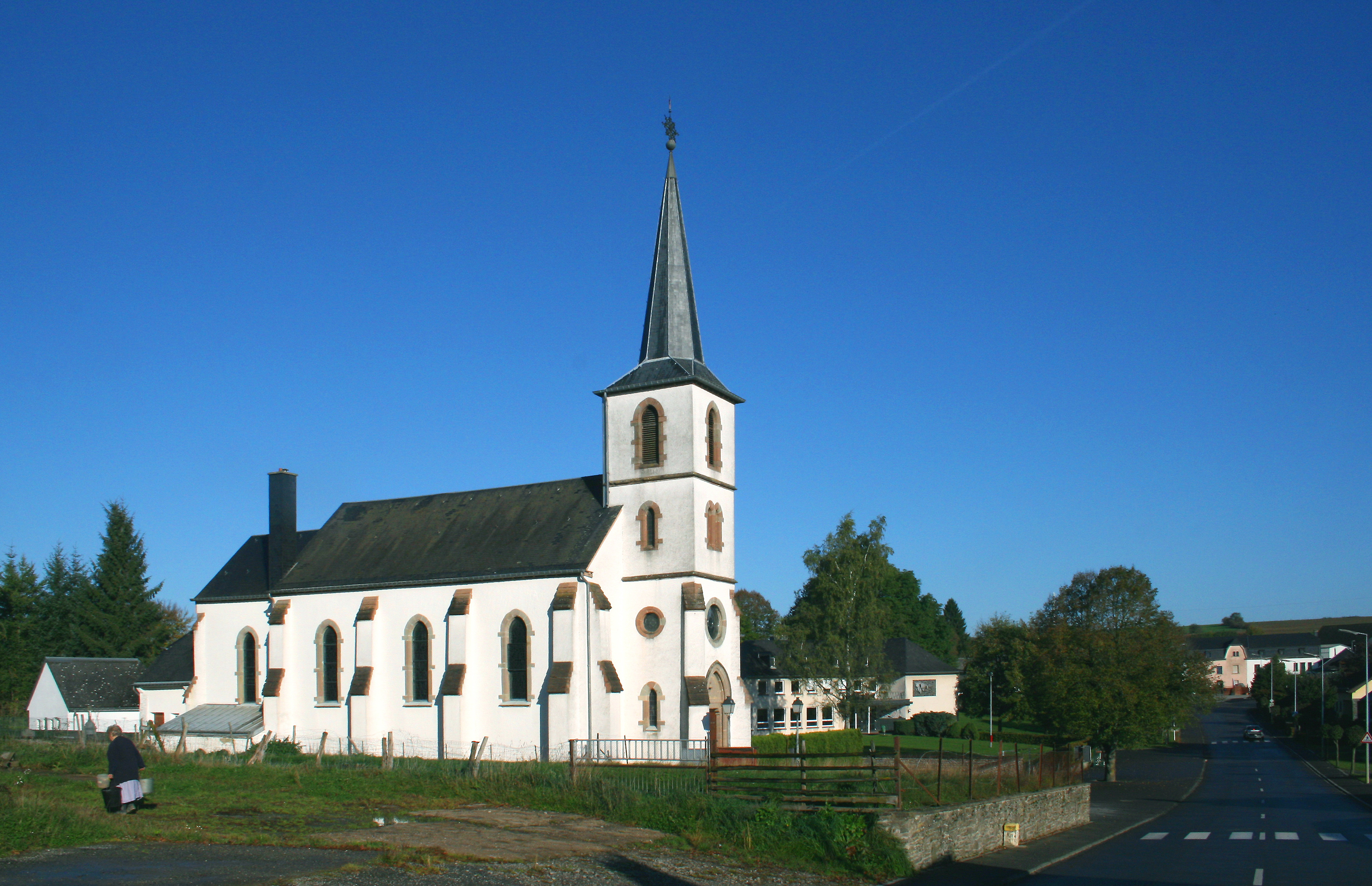
Around the church

== Church ==
By the 15th century, a chapel existed in Binsfeld. However, by the late 19th century, the population was outgrowing the chapel, and in 1892 planning began for a church. The new church was built in the Neo-Gothic style, and consecrated to the Holy Trinity on May 20, 1894. The patron saints are St. Anthony and St. Hubertus. There is a plaque at the church dedicated to young men from the Binsfeld who had been taken hostage during the Battle of the Bulge and later imprisoned in Germany.

== Attractions ==
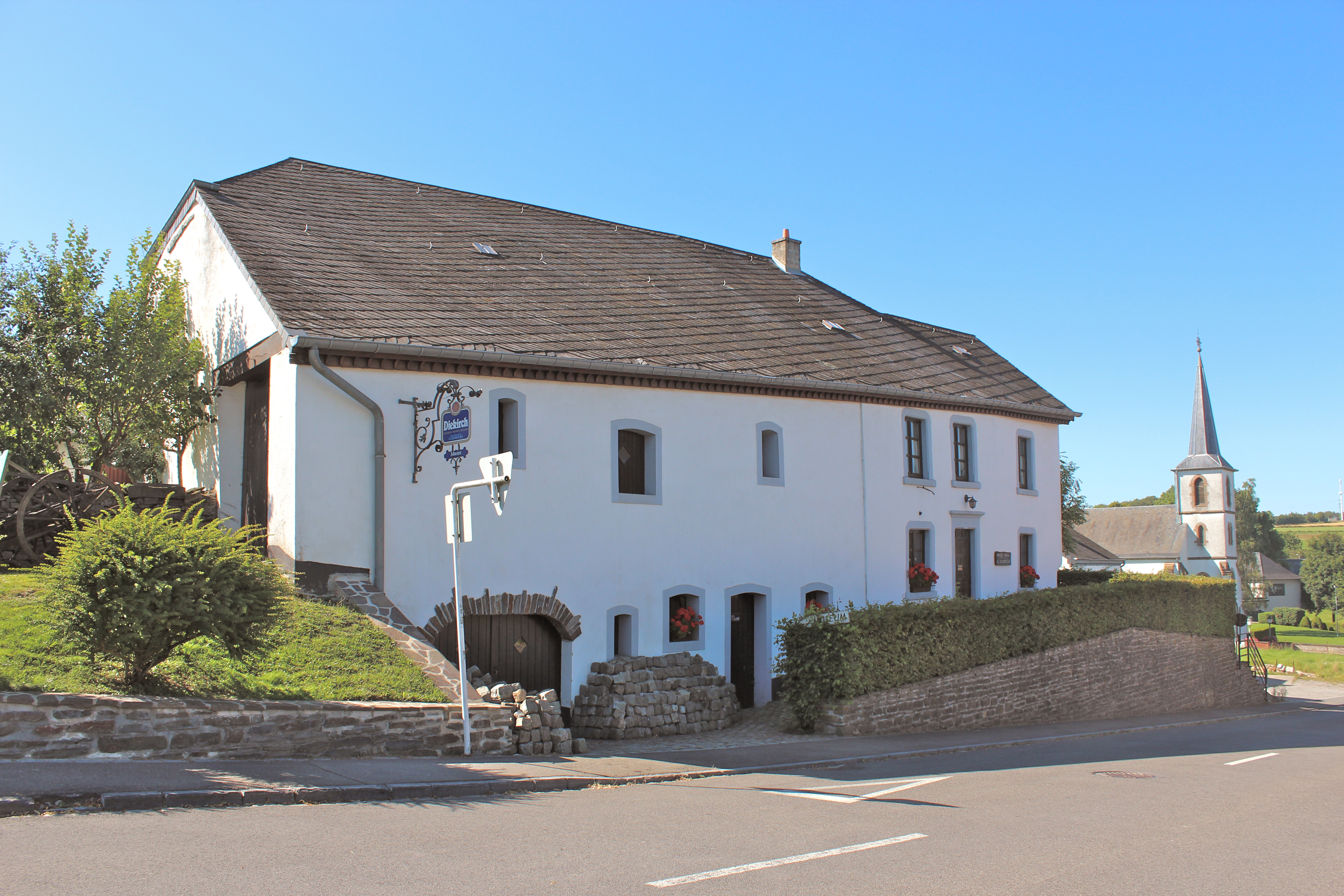
The 300 year old farmhouse “A Schiewesch”

Musée Rural Binsfeld, housed in A Schiewesch, is 300-year-old farmhouse which, along with its neighboring buildings, has been renovated in the traditional rural manner, and now houses more than 1100 exhibits. The museum seeks to reveal the past 300 years of rural living through its displays of household pieces, shoemaker's and weaver's workshops, stables, agricultural equipment, and more.

A Maulusmühle is a monument to aircraft of World War II, near Binsfeld and partially owned by the municipality of Weiswampach. It includes the wreckage of a downed airplane.

== See also ==
- List of villages in Luxembourg
