= Lancaster Memorial (Luxembourg) =

War memorial in Weiswampach, Luxembourg

Coordinates: 50.141455°N 6.113049°E

Aircraft and crew
No. 61 Squadron RAF motto: Per purum tonantes Avro Lancaster I ME596 QR-H			No. 75 Squadron RAF motto: Ake ake kia kaha (Maori); Avro Lancaster I HK564 AA-P
Taylor G.M.	RCAF	†	Mulcahy C.D.	RNZAF	†
Burnside J.K.	RAF	†	Parker R.R.	RAF	†
Nevin A.F.	RCAF	†	Hazard W.F.	RNZAF	†
Meek J.	RCAF	POW	Thomson E.L.	RNZAF	†
Adair S.	RAF	†	Elvin W.	RNZAF	†
Goulding W.	RAF	†	Jonston H.D.	RNZAF	†
Scrimshaw C.C.	RAF	†	Wright J.H.	RNZAF	†

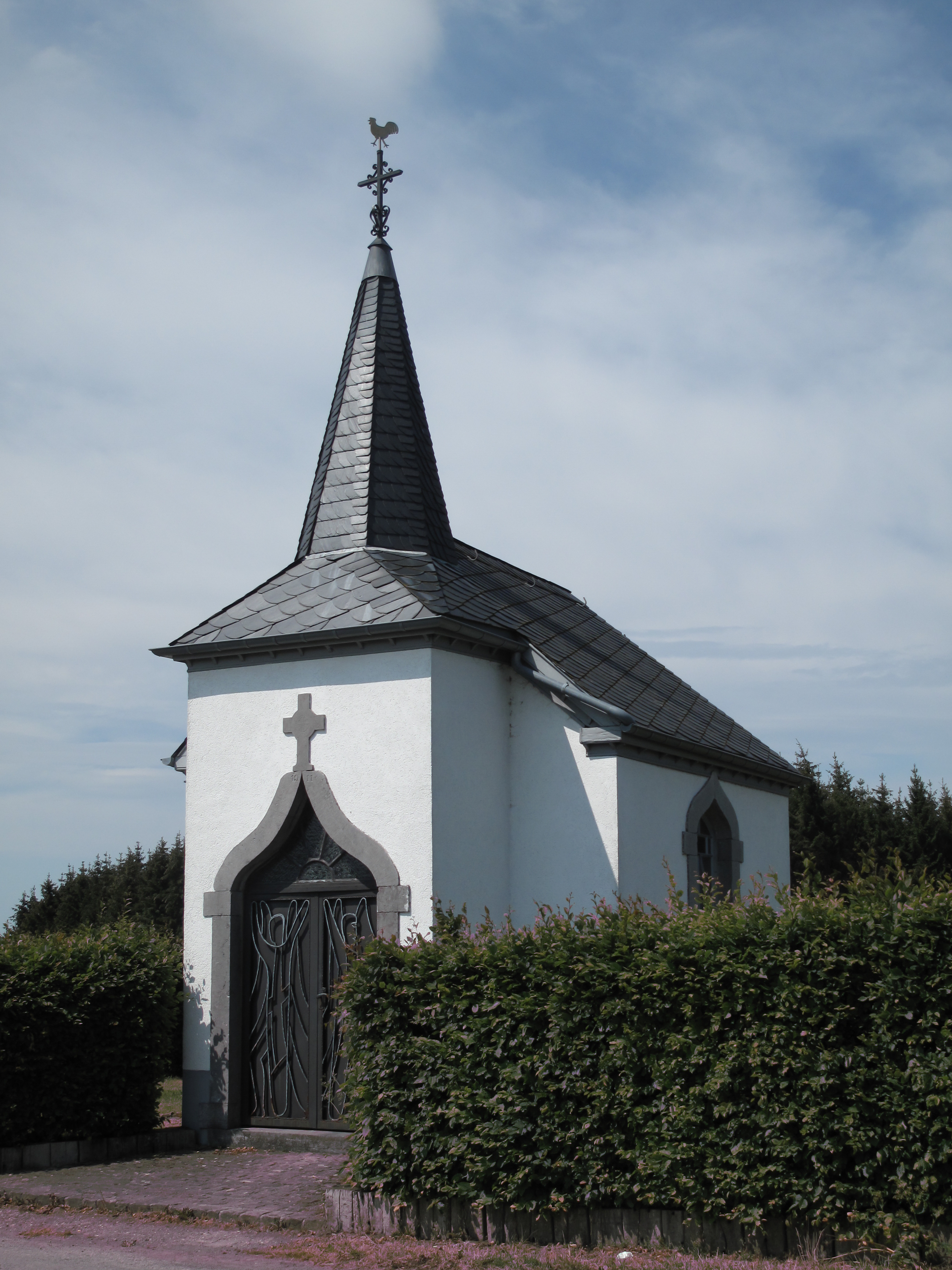
Ouren chapel near Lancaster Memorial

The Lancaster Memorial is a memorial in the northern Luxembourg locality of Weiswampach, which was erected 60 years after World War II in memory of 14 allied airmen, 13 of whom died on the spot and one who was made prisoner by the Germans. During the night from 12 to 13 August 1944 their aircraft, two Avro Lancasters, were shot down.
