= Rumlange =

Village in Luxembourg

Coordinates: 50°05′N 5°59′E

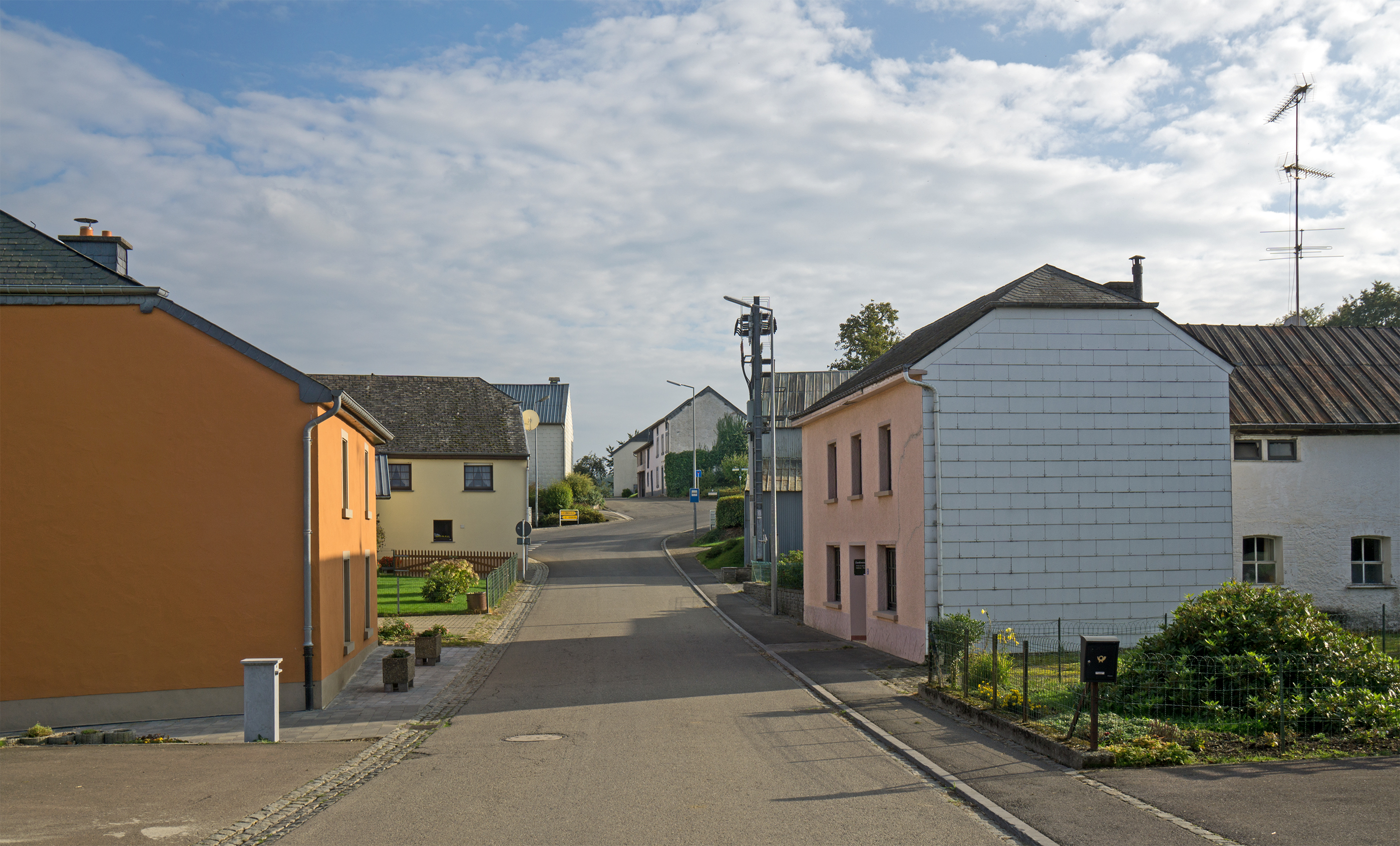
Street of Rumlange

Rumlange (Luxembourgish: Rëmeljen) is a village in the commune of Wincrange, in northern Luxembourg. As of September 2026, the village had a population of &à&.
