= Canton of Clervaux =

Canton of Clervaux Kanton Klierf (Luxembourgish) Kanton Clerf (German) Canton de Clervaux (French)
- Canton
- Coat of arms

- Coordinates: 50°4′N 6°2′E
- Country: Luxembourg
- Legislative constituency: Nord
- LAU 1: LU00005
- Communes (cities in bold): Clervaux; Parc Hosingen; Troisvierges; Weiswampach; Wincrange

Area
  - Total: 342.2 km^{2} (132.1 sq mi)
  - Rank: 1st of 12
- Highest elevation (1st of 12): 559 m (1,834 ft)
- Lowest elevation (9th of 12): 230 m (750 ft)

Population (2026)
  - Total: 22,179
  - Rank: 10th of 12
  - Density: 64.81/km^{2} (167.9/sq mi)
  - Rank: 12th of 12

Clervaux (Luxembourgish: Klierf) is the largest, northernmost, highest and least densely populated canton of Luxembourg. It makes up a large part of the Éislek region. It borders Belgium & Germany.

== Administrative divisions ==
Clerveaux Canton consists of the following five communes:

- Clervaux
- Parc Hosingen
- Troisvierges
- Weiswampach
- Wincrange

== Mergers ==
- On 1 January 1978 the former communes of Asselborn, Boevange, Hachiville, and Oberwampach (all from Clervaux Canton) were merged to create the commune of Wincrange. The law creating Wincrange was passed on 31 October 1977.
- On 29 May 2009 the former communes of Heinerscheid and Munshausen (both from Clervaux Canton) were absorbed into the commune of Clervaux. The law expanding Clervaux was passed on 24 May 2011.
- On 1 January 2012 the former communes of Consthum and Hosingen (both from Clervaux Canton) and Hoscheid (formerly part of Diekirch Canton) were merged to create the commune of Parc Hosingen. The law creating Parc Hosingen was passed on 24 May 2011.

== Population ==
Historical population

Year	Pop.	±%
1821	9,851	—
1851	14,763	+49.9%
1900	15,771	+6.8%
1910	16,435	+4.2%
1922	15,807	−3.8%
1935	15,096	−4.5%

Year	Pop.	±%
1947	13,405	−11.2%
1960	11,458	−14.5%
1970	10,543	−8.0%
1981	9,880	−6.3%
1990	10,547	+6.8%
2000	12,116	+14.9%

Year	Pop.	±%
2005	13,719	+13.2%
2010	15,138	+10.3%
2015	16,822	+11.1%
2020	18,936	+12.6%
2021	19,382	+2.4%

Source data
