= Wahl, Luxembourg =

Wahl Wal
- Commune
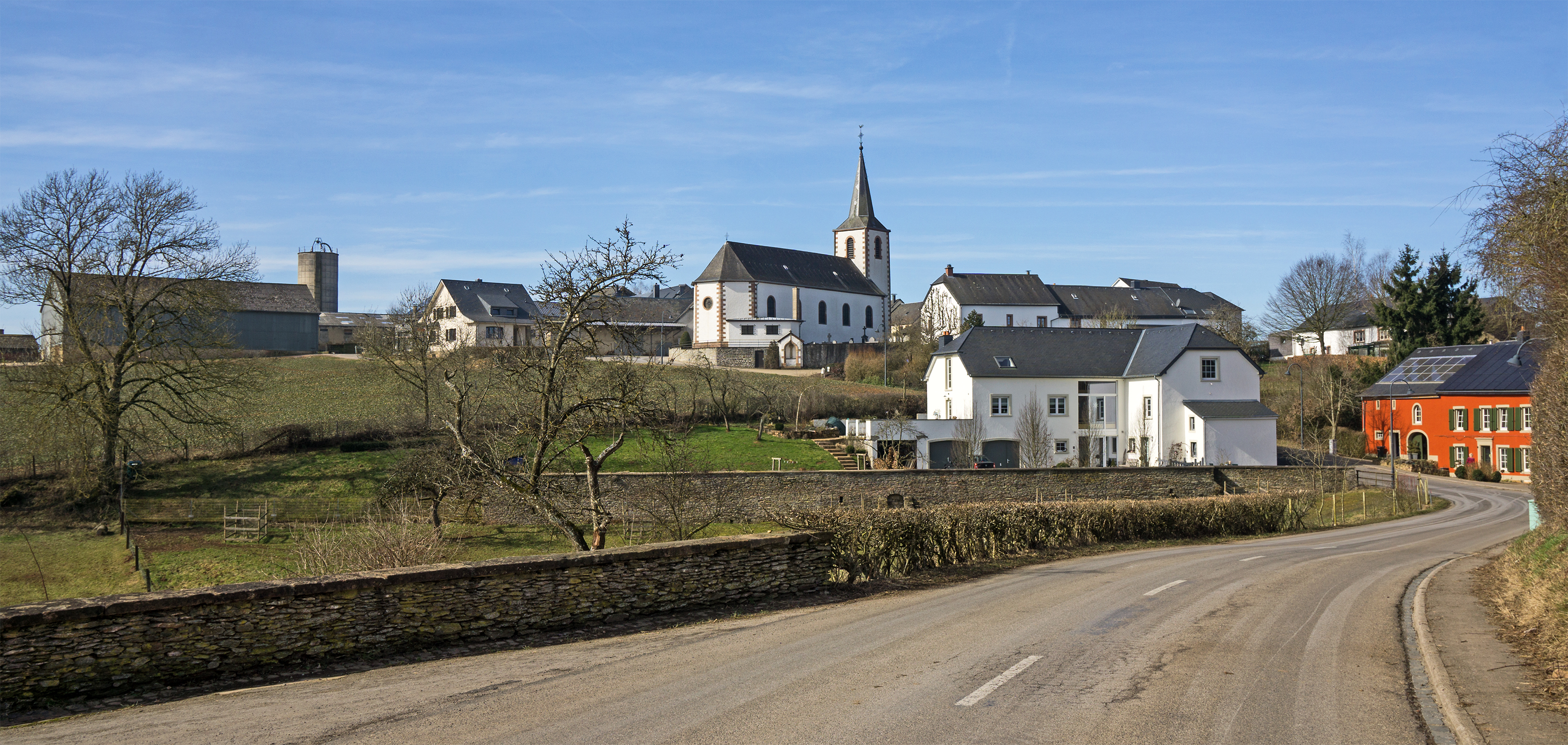

- Coat of arms

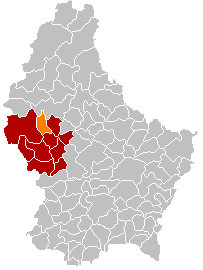
- Map of Luxembourg with Wahl highlighted in orange, and the canton in dark red
- Coordinates: 49.8358°N 5.9056°E
- Country: Luxembourg
- Canton: Redange
  - Rank: 59th of 102
- Lowest elevation: 305 m (1,001 ft)
  - Rank: 95th of 102
  - Rank: ? of 102
  - Rank: ? of 102
- Time zone: UTC+1 (CET)
  - Summer (DST): UTC+2 (CEST)
- LAU 2: LU0000710
- Website: wahl.lu

Wahl (German pronunciation: [vaːl]; Luxembourgish: Wal) is a small town and former commune in western Luxembourg, in the canton of Redange.

As of September 2026, the town of Wahl, which lies in the south of the commune of Groussbus-Wal, has a population of 475.

== Former commune ==
The former commune consisted of the villages:

- Brattert
- Buschrodt (Bëschrued)
- Grevels (Gréiwels)
- Heispelt (Heeschpelt)
- Kuborn (Kéiber)
- Rindschleiden (Randschelt) (Note: Considered as the smallest populated place in the nation of Luxembourg.)
- Wahl (Wal)
- Nei Brasilien (lieu-dit)
- Kinnekshaff (lieu-dit)
- Ënnescht Millen (lieu-dit)
- Réidingshaff (lieu-dit)
- Ringbaach (lieu-dit)

== History ==
Starting in early 2019, Wahl had intense discussions with its neighbour, Grosbous, concerning a fusion of the two communes under the name Groussbus-Wal. An important step in this process was the referendum of June 27, 2021, when the inhabitants of both communes expressed their opinion about the project of merging the two communes. The majority of voters in both communes supported the fusion, which took place in September 2023, after the next municipal elections in June 2023.

== Population ==
Historical population

| Year | Pop. | ±% |
|---|---|---|
| 1821 | 767 | — |
| 1851 | 1,370 | +78.6% |
| 1900 | 1,076 | −21.5% |
| 1910 | 957 | −11.1% |
| 1922 | 886 | −7.4% |
| 1935 | 801 | −9.6% |

| Year | Pop. | ±% |
|---|---|---|
| 1947 | 690 | −13.9% |
| 1960 | 668 | −3.2% |
| 1970 | 549 | −17.8% |
| 1981 | 550 | +0.2% |
| 1990 | 574 | +4.4% |
| 2000 | 644 | +12.2% |

| Year | Pop. | ±% |
|---|---|---|
| 2005 | 746 | +15.8% |
| 2010 | 850 | +13.9% |
| 2015 | 960 | +12.9% |
| 2020 | 1,034 | +7.7% |
| 2021 | 1,036 | +0.2% |

Source data

== Economy ==
In addition to the commune administration, Wahl has a church and cemetery, but no local stores or restaurants. The local industry mainly comprises farming, with a few exceptions, like Topsolar (solar- & other alternative energies), Supernova Cult (fashion) and WebSEO (web design), who are the three main non-agriculture related businesses based in Wahl.

== Notable persons ==
- Foni Tissen (artist)
- Nicolas Grang (explorer)
- Nicolas Kransz (business man)
- Léon Peller (WWII resistance fighter)
- Albert Gricius (priest)

Wahl is also well known for a less "real" person. According to old local myths and legends, the village was also home to the fabled werewolf of Wahl, a man cursed after a dispute with the local minister.
