= Tuntange =

Tuntange Tënten
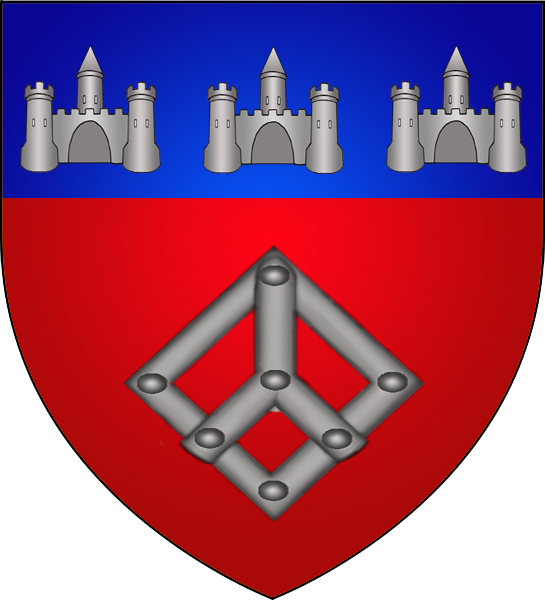
- Coat of arms

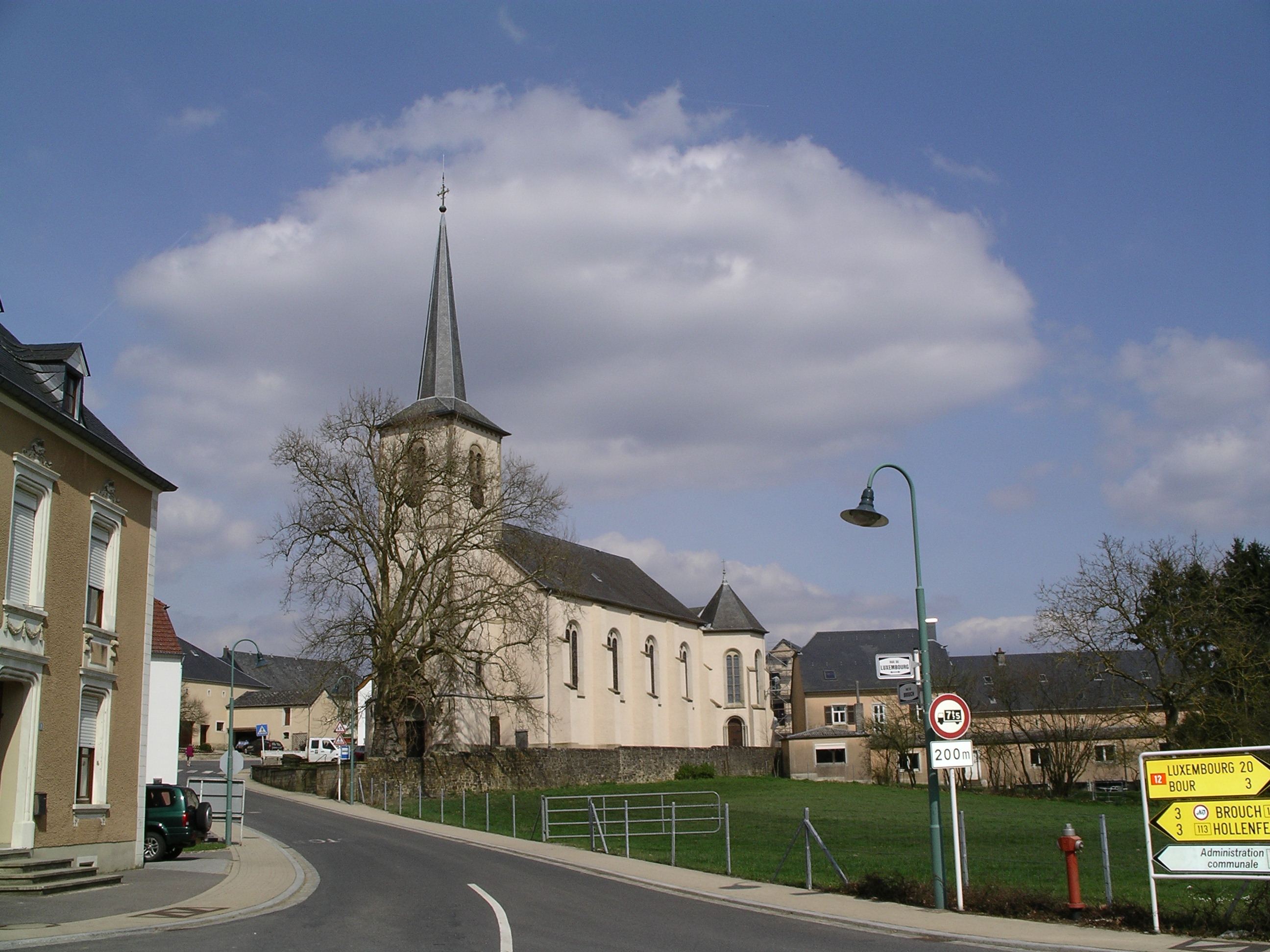
- Tuntange church and its remarkable platanus
- Country: Luxembourg
- Canton: Mersch
- Commune: Helperknapp

Area
  - Total: 187 km^{2} (72 sq mi)

Population (2024)
  - Total: 1,370
- Website: https://www.helperknapp.lu

Tuntange (French pronunciation: [tœ̃tɑ̃ʒ]; Luxembourgish: Tënten; German: Tüntingen) is a small town in western Luxembourg, in the canton of Mersch. As of 2025, it had a population of 1,379.

Until 31 December 2017, Tutange was a separate commune. On 1 January 2018, it merged with Boevange-sur-Attert to form the new commune of Helperknapp.

== Former commune ==
The former commune consisted of the villages:

- Ansembourg
- Bour
- Hollenfels
- Marienthal
- Tuntange (seat)
- Claushof (lieu-dit)
- Kalbacherhof (lieu-dit)
- Marienthalerhof (lieu-dit)

== Coat of arms ==
The arms were granted on January 25, 1983.

The field with its single charge, a buckle, is derived from the arms of the Lords of Hollenfels, as the village was part of the Hollenfels Estate. The chief symbolizes the three castles in the town; the Hollenfels Castle and the Old Castle of Ansembourg and New Castle of Ansembourg.
