= Boevange-sur-Attert =

Town and former commune in Mersch canton, Luxembourg

Boevange-sur-Attert Béiwen-Atert
- Former commune of Luxembourg
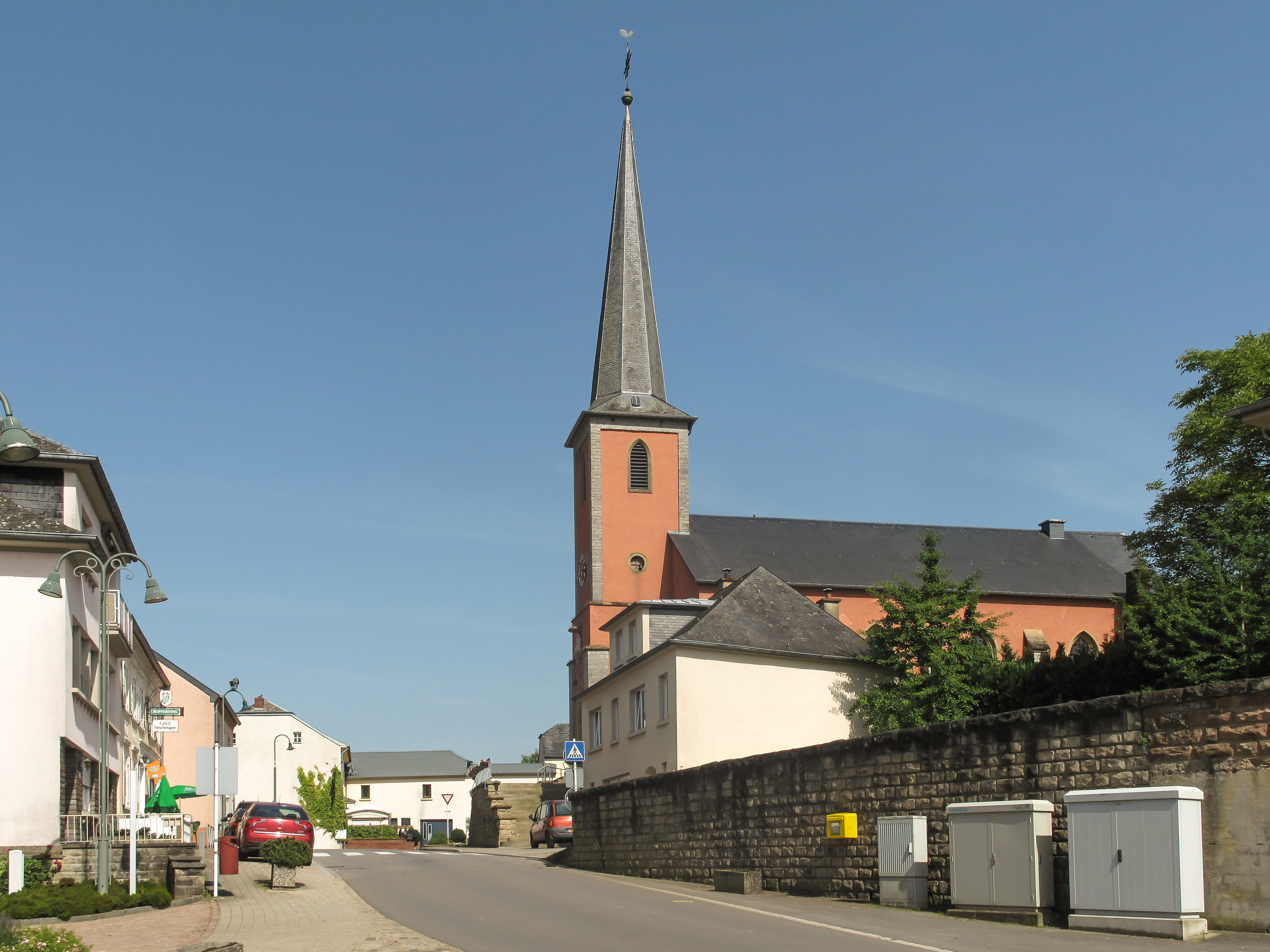

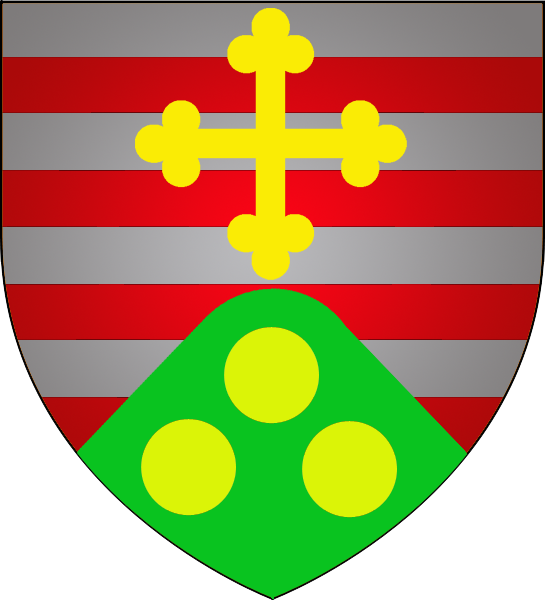
- Coat of arms

- Map of Luxembourg with the former commune highlighted in orange, and the canton in dark red
- Country: Luxembourg
- Canton: Mersch
- Commune: Helperknapp

Population (2024)
  - Total: 989

Boevange-sur-Attert (Note: French pronunciation: [bøvɑ̃ʒ syʁ atɛʁt]; Luxembourgish: Béiwen-Atert; German: Böwingen/Attert) is a small town in central Luxembourg, in the canton of Mersch. It is situated on the river Attert and had a population of 1,161 as of 2026.

Until 31 December 2017, it was a commune. On 1 January 2018, the commune was merged with Tuntange to form the new commune of Helperknapp.

== Former commune ==
The former commune consisted of the villages:

- Bill
- Boevange-sur-Attert
- Brouch
- Buschdorf
- Grevenknapp
- Fënsterdall
- Openthalt
- Brichermillen (lieu-dit)
- Fënsterdallerhéicht (lieu-dit)
- Helperknapp (lieu-dit)
