= Grosbous =

Grosbous Groussbus, Bus
- Commune
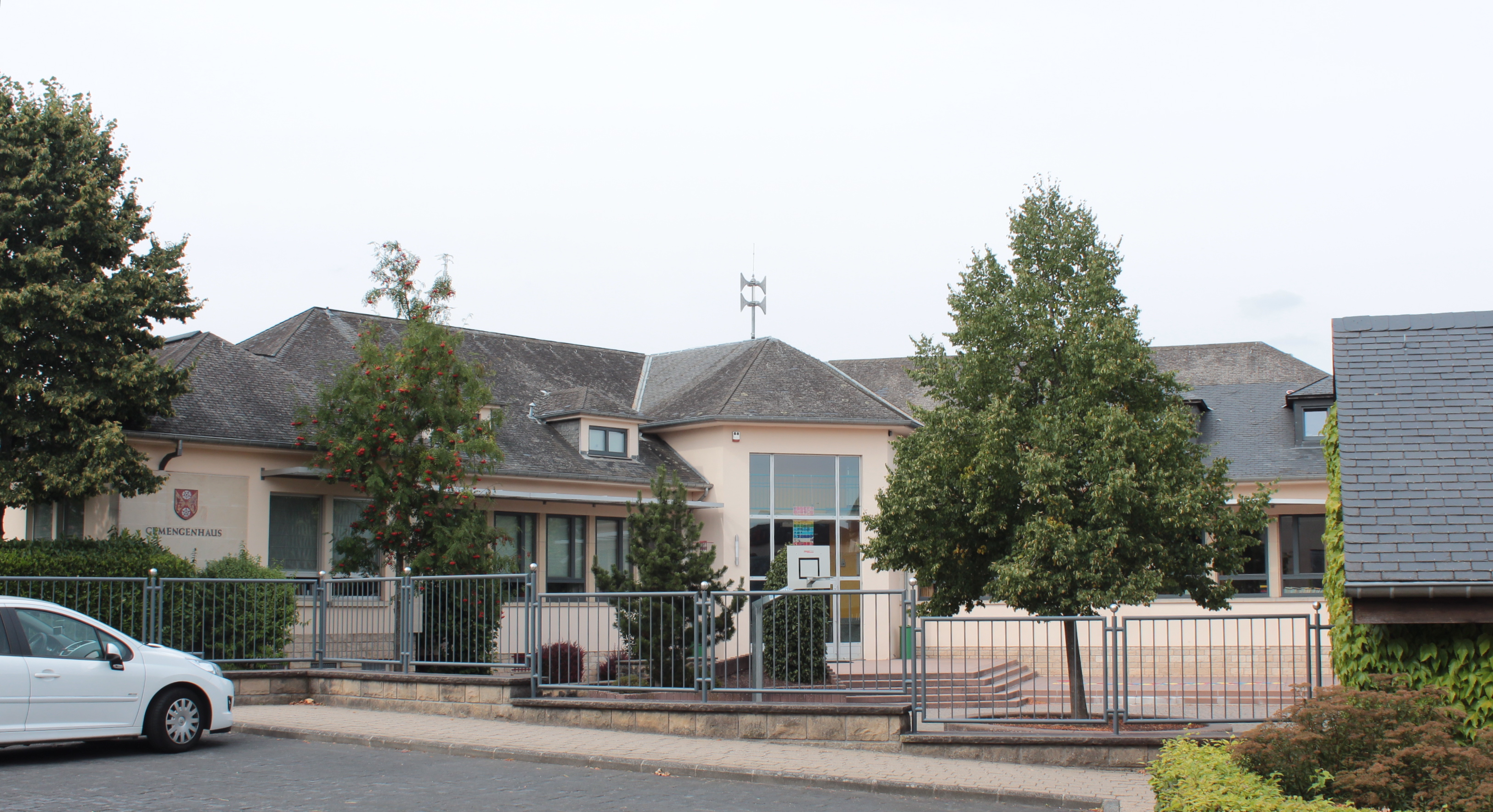
- Town hall

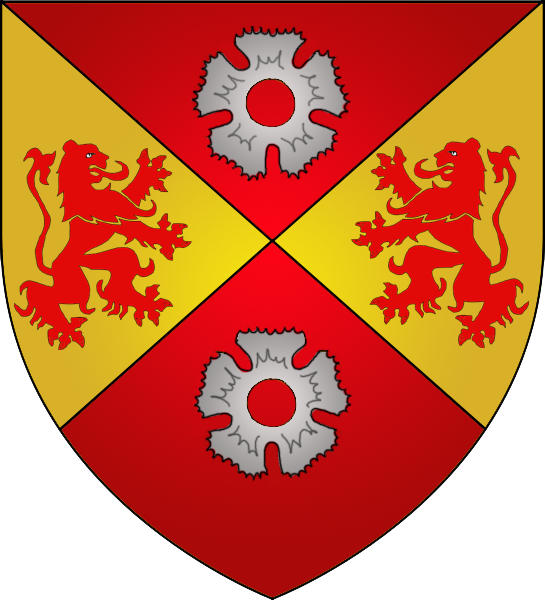
- Coat of arms

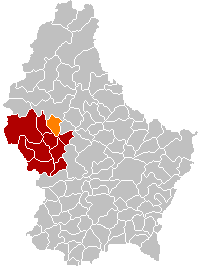
- Map of Luxembourg with Grosbous highlighted in orange, and the canton in dark red
- Coordinates: 49.8333°N 5.9667°E
- Country: Luxembourg
- Canton: Redange
  - Rank: 58th of 102
- Lowest elevation: 301 m (988 ft)
  - Rank: 93rd of 102
  - Rank: ? of 102
  - Rank: ? of 102
- Time zone: UTC+1 (CET)
  - Summer (DST): UTC+2 (CEST)
- LAU 2: LU0000705
- Website: groussbus.lu

Grosbous (Luxembourgish: Groussbus [ɡʀəʊ̯sˈbus] or (locally) Bus [buːs]; German: Grosbous) is a former commune and small town in northwestern Luxembourg, in the canton of Redange.

As of September 2026, the town of Grosbous, which lies in the south of the commune of Groussbus-Wal, had a population of 1,082.

== Former commune ==
The former commune consisted of the villages:

- Dellen
- Grevels (Gréiwels)
- Grosbous (Groussbus)
- Lehrhof (Léierhaff)

== History ==
Starting in early 2019, Grosbous had intense discussions with its neighbour, Wahl, concerning a fusion of the two communes under the name Groussbus-Wal. An important step in this process was the referendum of June 27, 2021, when the inhabitants of both communes expressed their opinion about the project of merging the two communes. The majority of voters in both communes supported the fusion, which took place in September 2023, after the next municipal elections in June 2023.

== Population ==
Historical population

Year	Pop.	±%
1821	595	—
1851	805	+35.3%
1900	672	−16.5%
1910	656	−2.4%
1922	634	−3.4%
1935	522	−17.7%

Year	Pop.	±%
1947	593	+13.6%
1960	497	−16.2%
1970	460	−7.4%
1981	577	+25.4%
1990	616	+6.8%
2000	760	+23.4%

Year	Pop.	±%
2005	780	+2.6%
2010	883	+13.2%
2015	937	+6.1%
2020	1,111	+18.6%
2021	1,112	+0.1%

Source data
