= Bour =

Bour may refer to:

== Places ==
- Bour (commune), Phnum Proek District, Battambang Province, Cambodia
- Bour, Luxembourg, a village in Helperknapp, Luxembourg.
- Bøur, a village in Sørvágs, the Faroe Islands
- M'bour, a town in Senegal

== Other uses ==
- Bour (surname)
- Bour, the Romanian name of the aurochs
- Maad a Sinig, a Serer royal title sometimes called Bour Sine
- Maad Saloum, a Serer royal title sometimes called Bour Saloum
