= Lehrhof =

Village in Luxembourg

Lehrhof Léierhaff
- Village
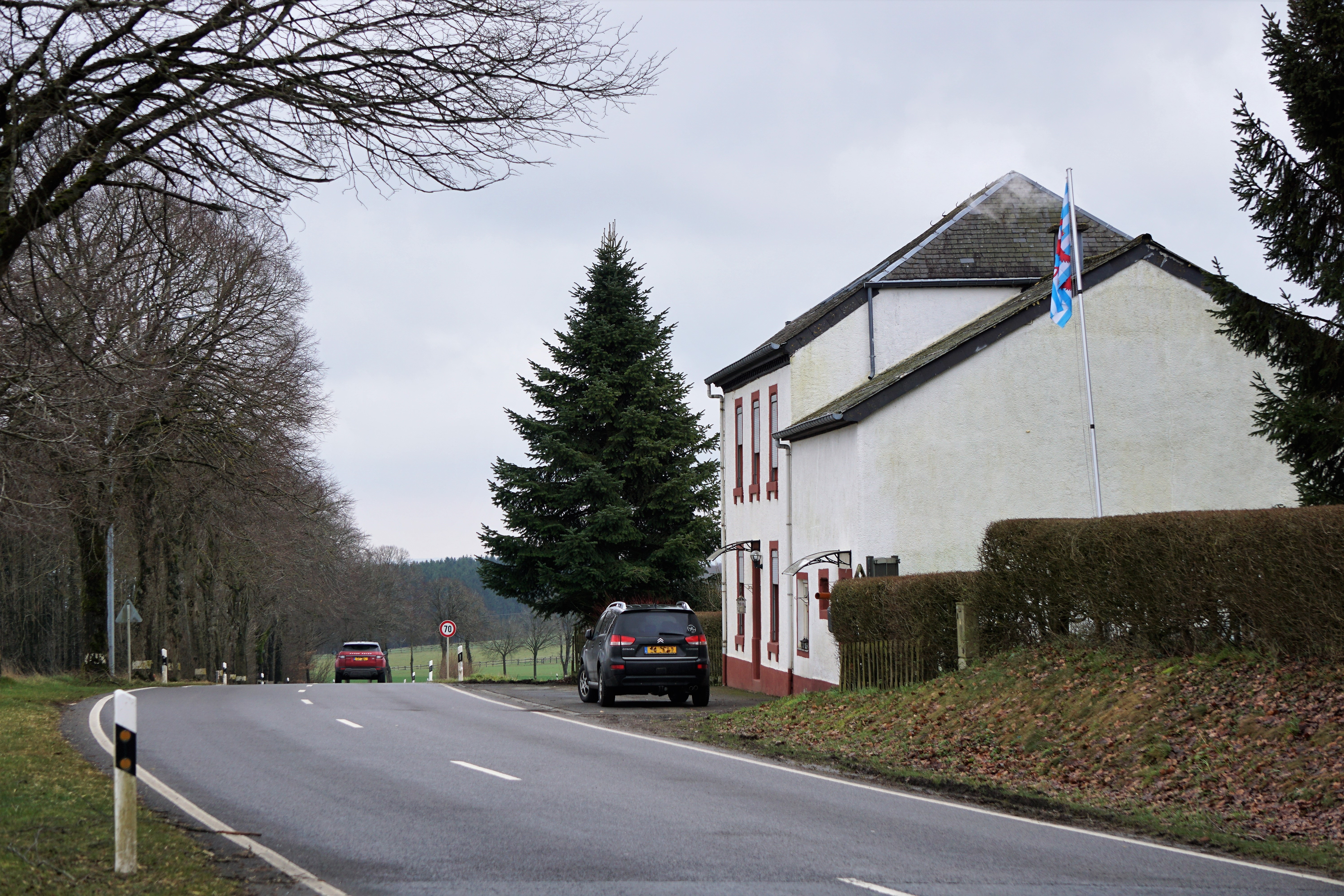

- Location within Luxembourg
- Coordinates: 49°51′18″N 5°56′44″E
- Country: Luxembourg
- Canton: Redange
- Commune: Groussbus-Wal

Population
  - Total: 18 (2,022)
- Time zone: UTC+1 (CET)
  - Summer (DST): UTC+2 (CEST)

Lehrhof (German pronunciation: [ˈleːɐ̯hoːf]; Luxembourgish: Léierhaff) is a village in northwestern Luxembourg. It has a population of 17 as of 2026.

Since September 2023, Lehrhof is situated in the commune of Groussbus-Wal. It was previously located in the commune of Grosbous.
