= Brouch =

Coordinates: 49.7357°N 6.0201°E

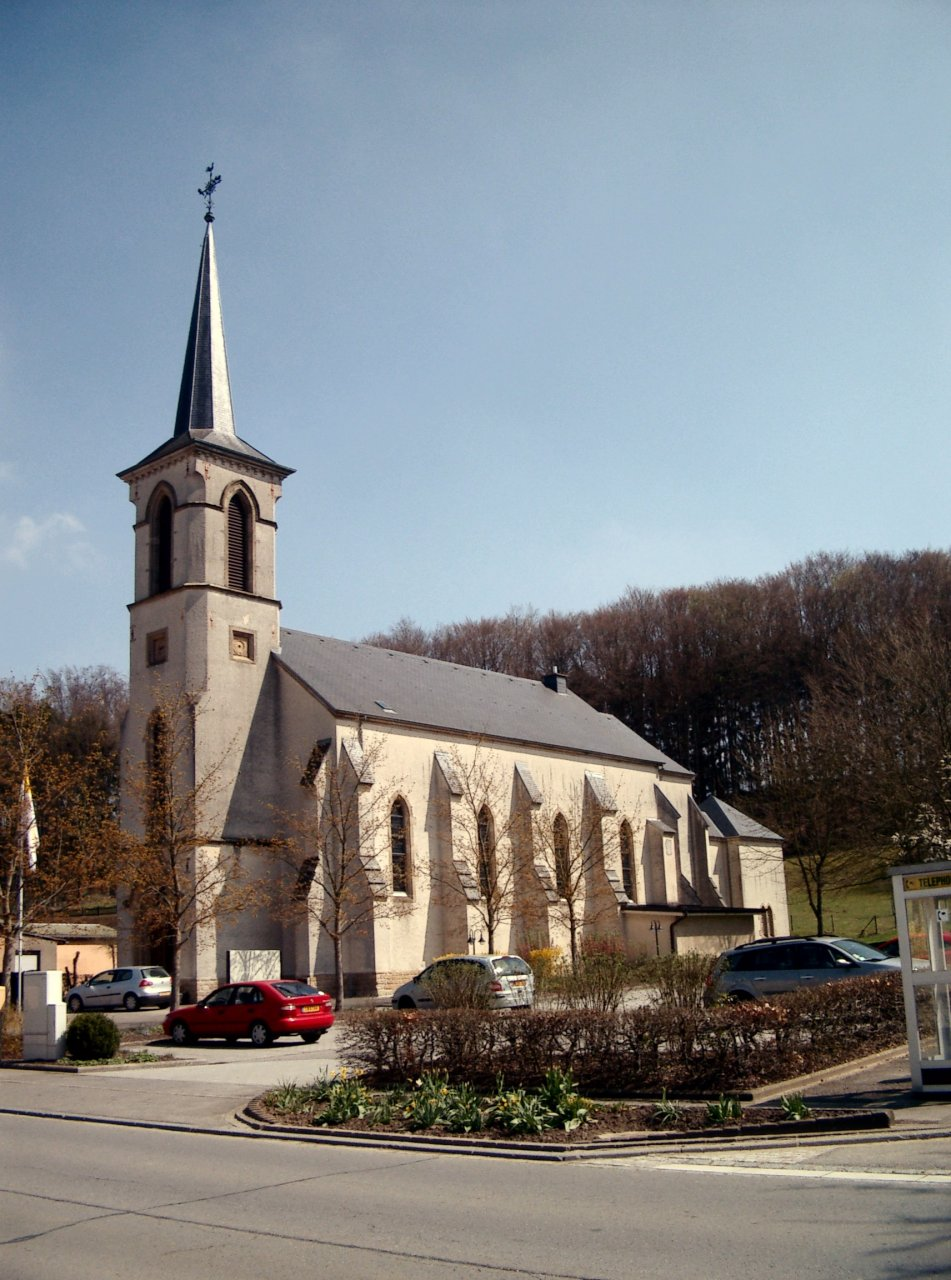
Church of Bruch

Brouch (Luxembourgish: Bruch, German: Bruch) is a small town in the commune of Helperknapp, in western Luxembourg. As of September 2026, the town has a population of 1,091.
