= Brattert =

Village in Luxembourg

Coordinates: 49°51′18″N 5°54′07″E

Brattert Brattert
- Village
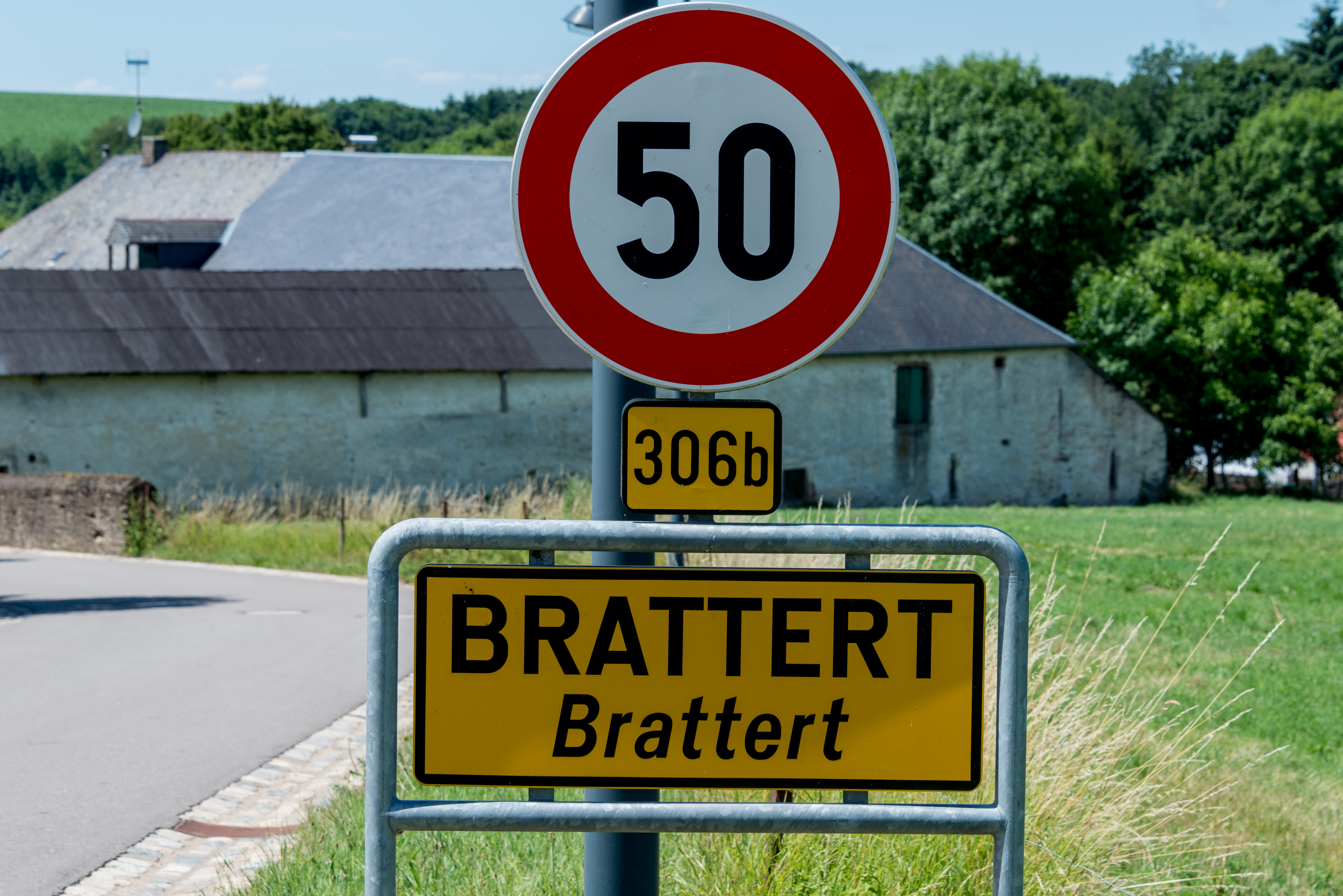
- Interactive map of Brattert
- Country: Luxembourg
- Canton: Redange
- Commune: Groussbus-Wal

Population
  - Total: 24
- Time zone: UTC+1 (CET)
  - Summer (DST): UTC+2 (CEST)

Brattert (Luxembourgish: Brattert) is a village in northwestern Luxembourg.

It is situated in the commune of Groussbus-Wal and has a population of 24 as of 2026.

Notable People:

Raoul Wagner

== Gallery ==
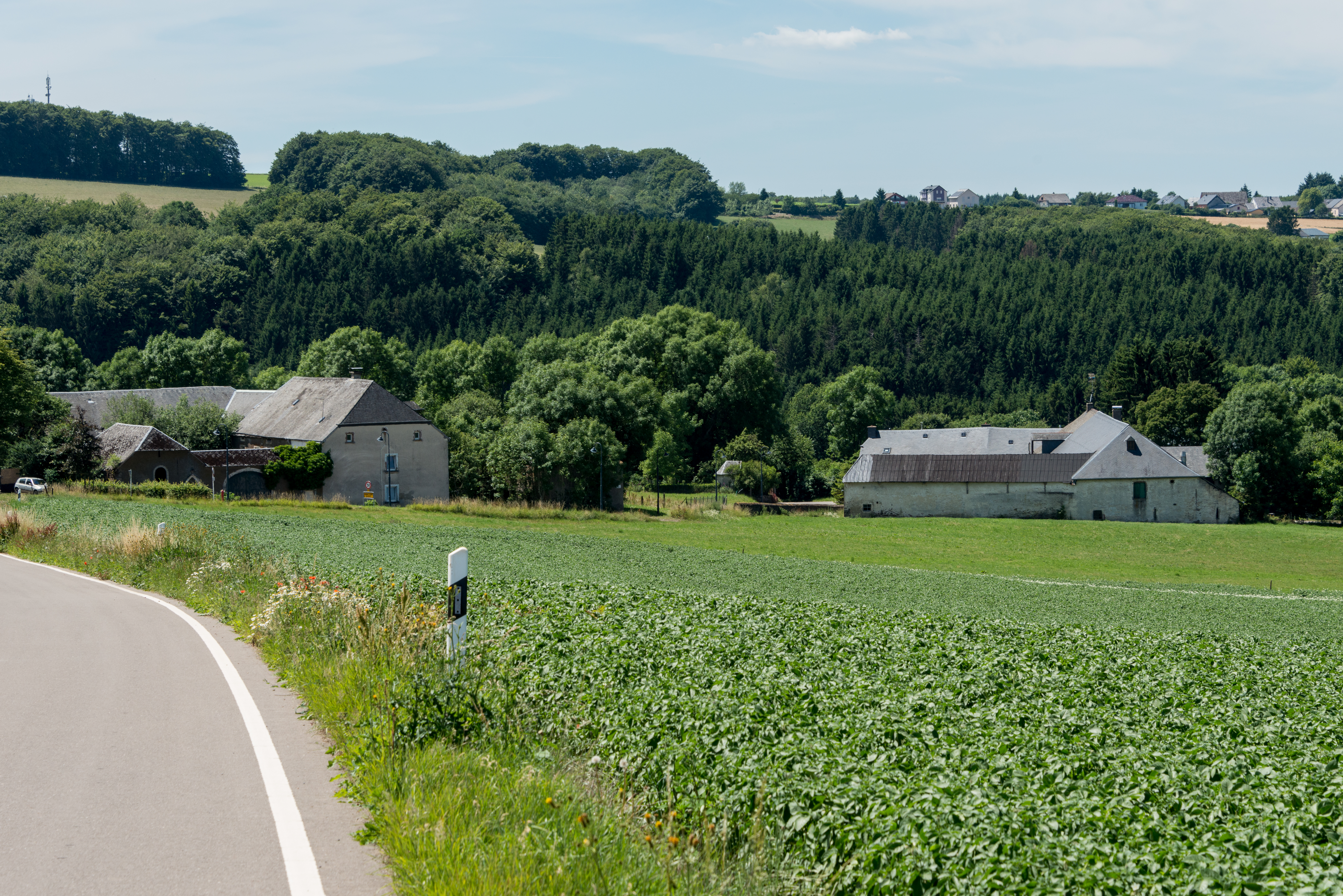
View over Brattert
