= Kuborn =

Village in Luxembourg

Coordinates: 49°52′11″N 5°54′04″E

Kuborn Kéiber
- Village
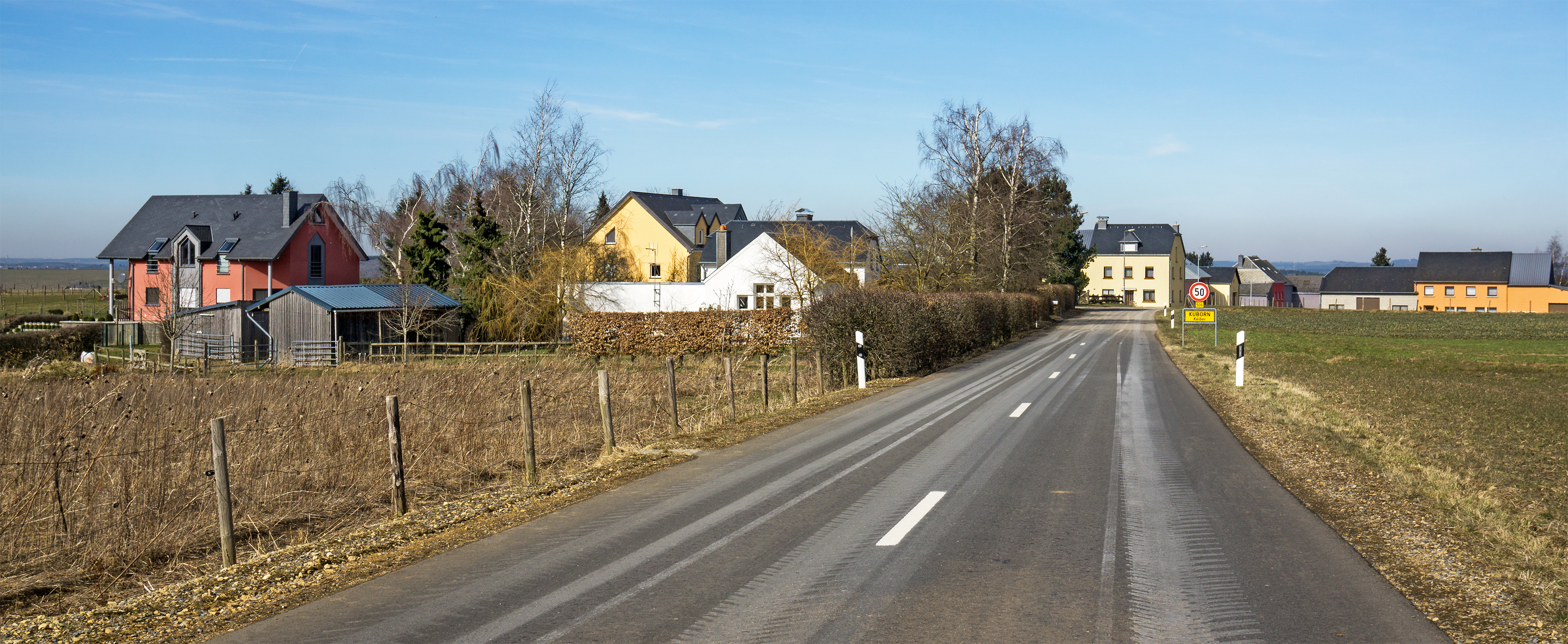
- View over Kuborn
- Interactive map of Kuborn
- Country: Luxembourg
- Canton: Redange
- Commune: Groussbus-Wal

Population
  - Total: 114
- Time zone: UTC+1 (CET)
  - Summer (DST): UTC+2 (CEST)

Kuborn (German pronunciation: [ˈkuːbɔʁn]; Luxembourgish: Kéiber) is a village in northwestern Luxembourg.

It is situated in the commune of Groussbus-Wal and has a population of 116 as of 2026. Other references: www.kuborn.net

== Gallery ==
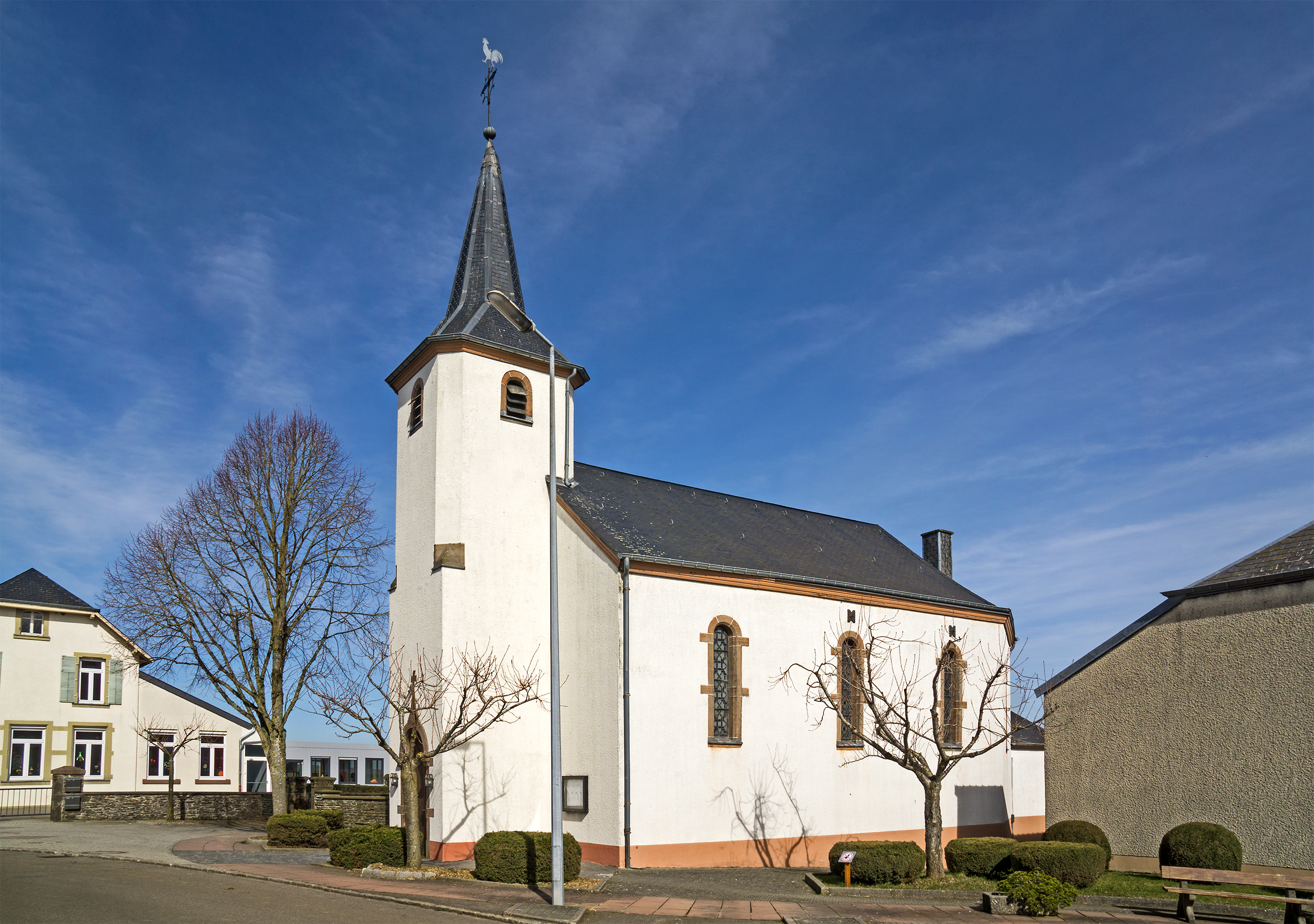
Church in Kuborn

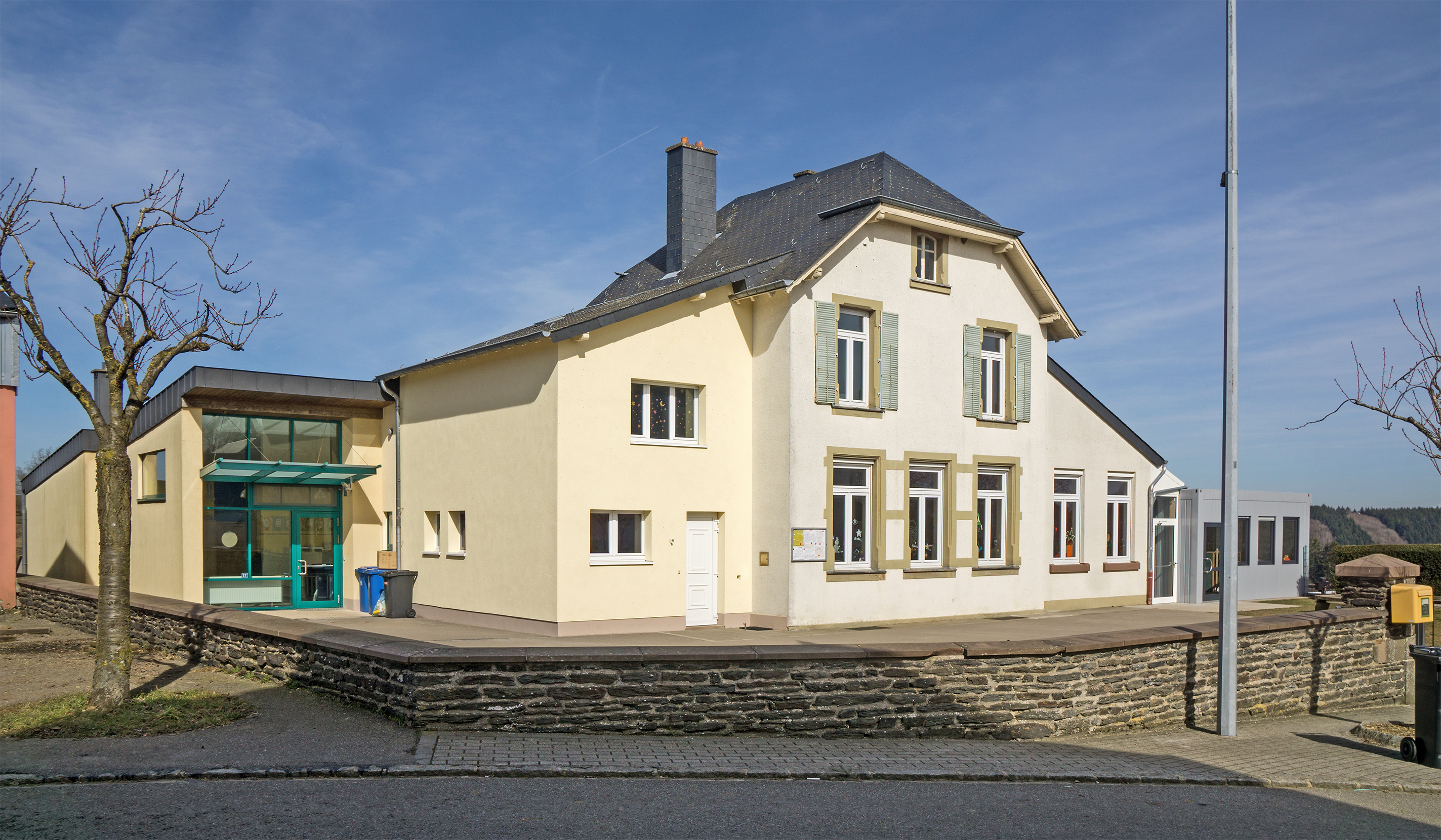
School in Kuborn
