= Grevenknapp =

Village in Luxembourg

Coordinates: 49°45′N 6°02′E

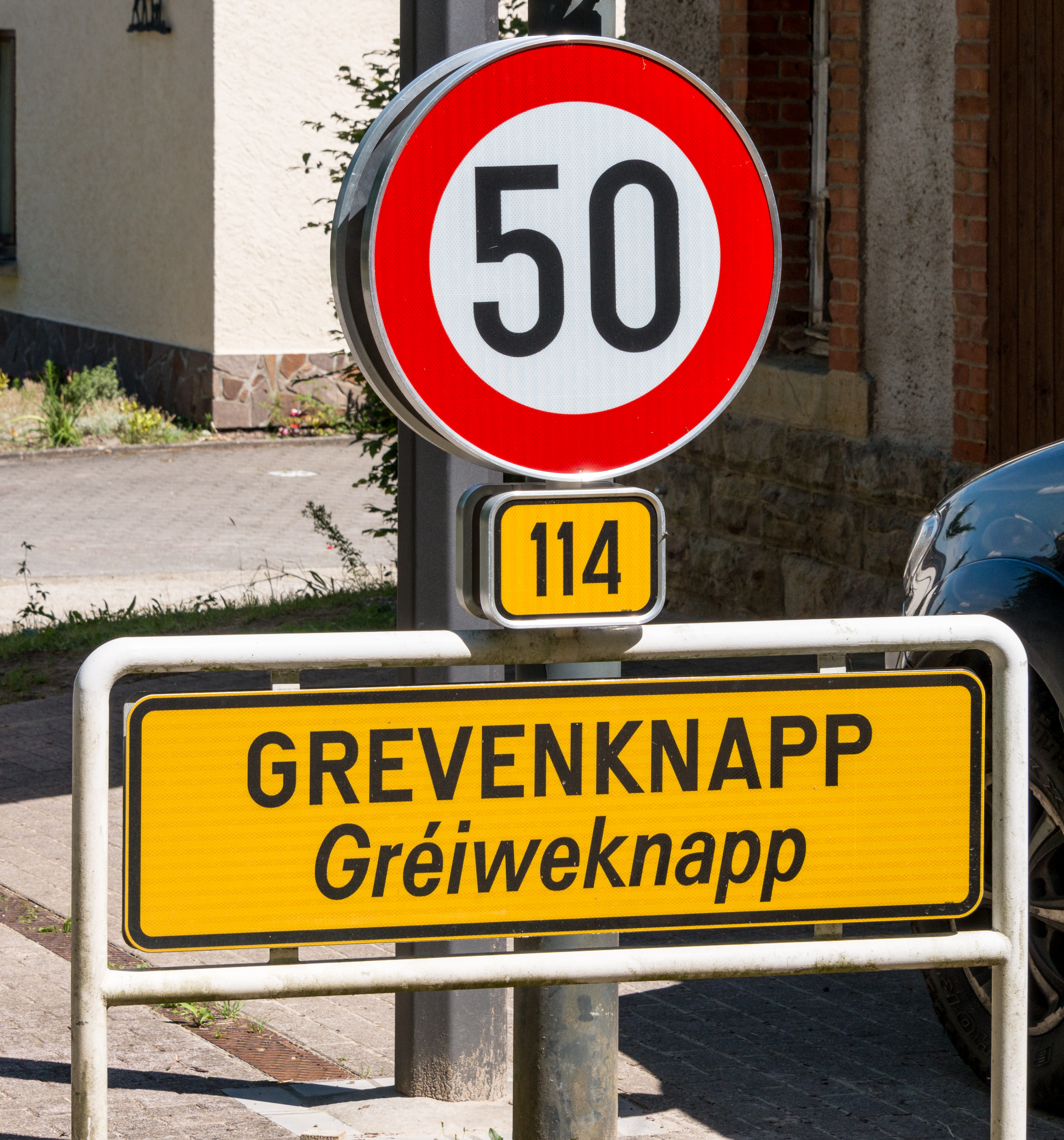

Grevenknapp (Luxembourgish: Gréiweknapp) is a village in the commune of Helperknapp, in western Luxembourg. As of September 2026, the village had a population of 325. The altitude of Grevenknapp is about 317 meters.
