= Rindschleiden =

Village in Luxembourg

Coordinates: 49°50′59″N 5°54′00″E

Rindschleiden Randschelt
- Village
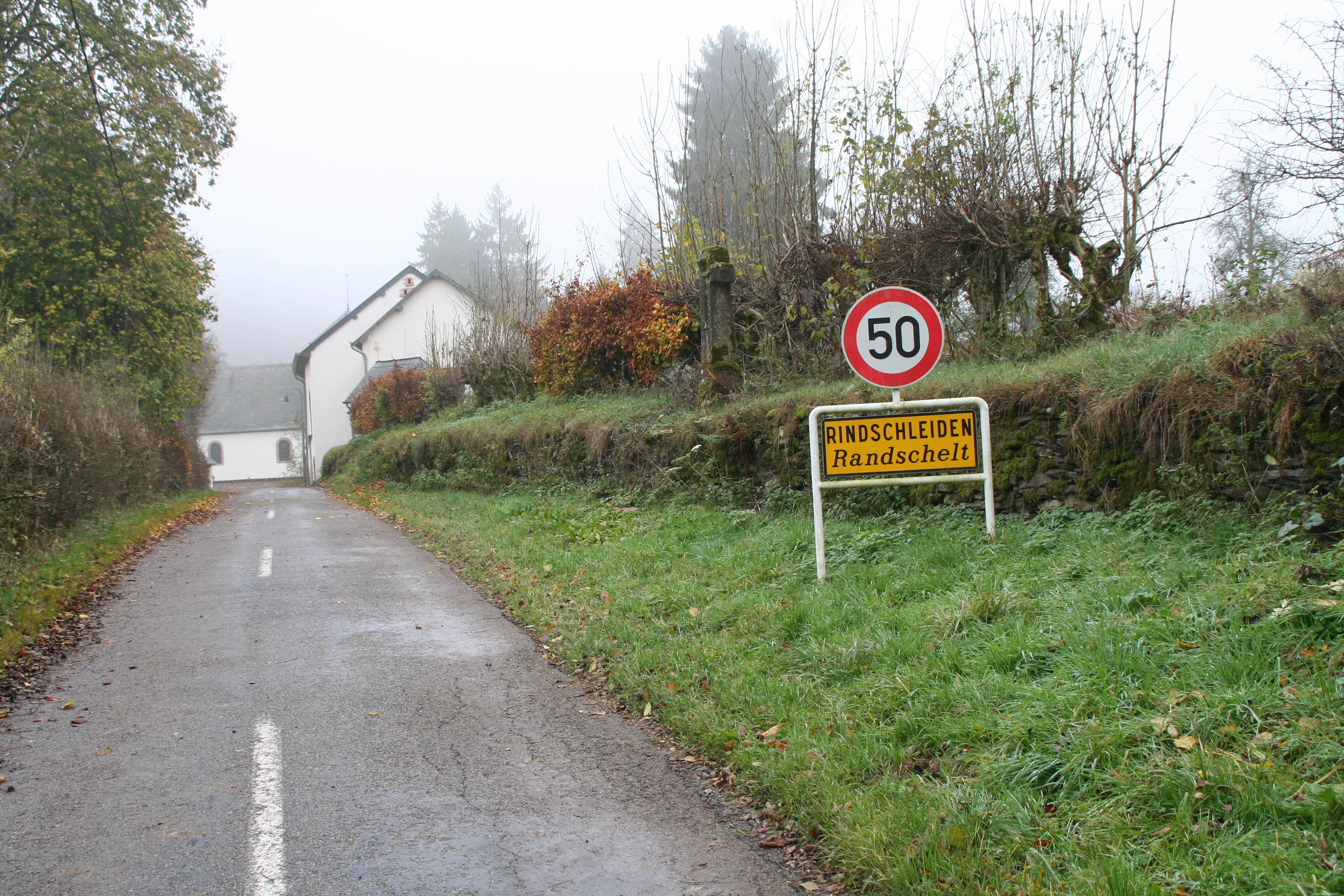
- Interactive map of Rindschleiden
- Country: Luxembourg
- Canton: Redange
- Commune: Groussbus-Wal

Population
  - Total: 0
- Time zone: UTC+1 (CET)
  - Summer (DST): UTC+2 (CEST)

Rindschleiden (German pronunciation: [ˈʁɪntʃlaɪdn̩]; Luxembourgish: Randschelt) is a village in northwestern Luxembourg.

It is situated in the commune of Groussbus-Wal and has a population of 0.

It is known as the "smallest locality in Luxembourg", since it is the only village in Luxembourg with no current population.

== Gallery ==
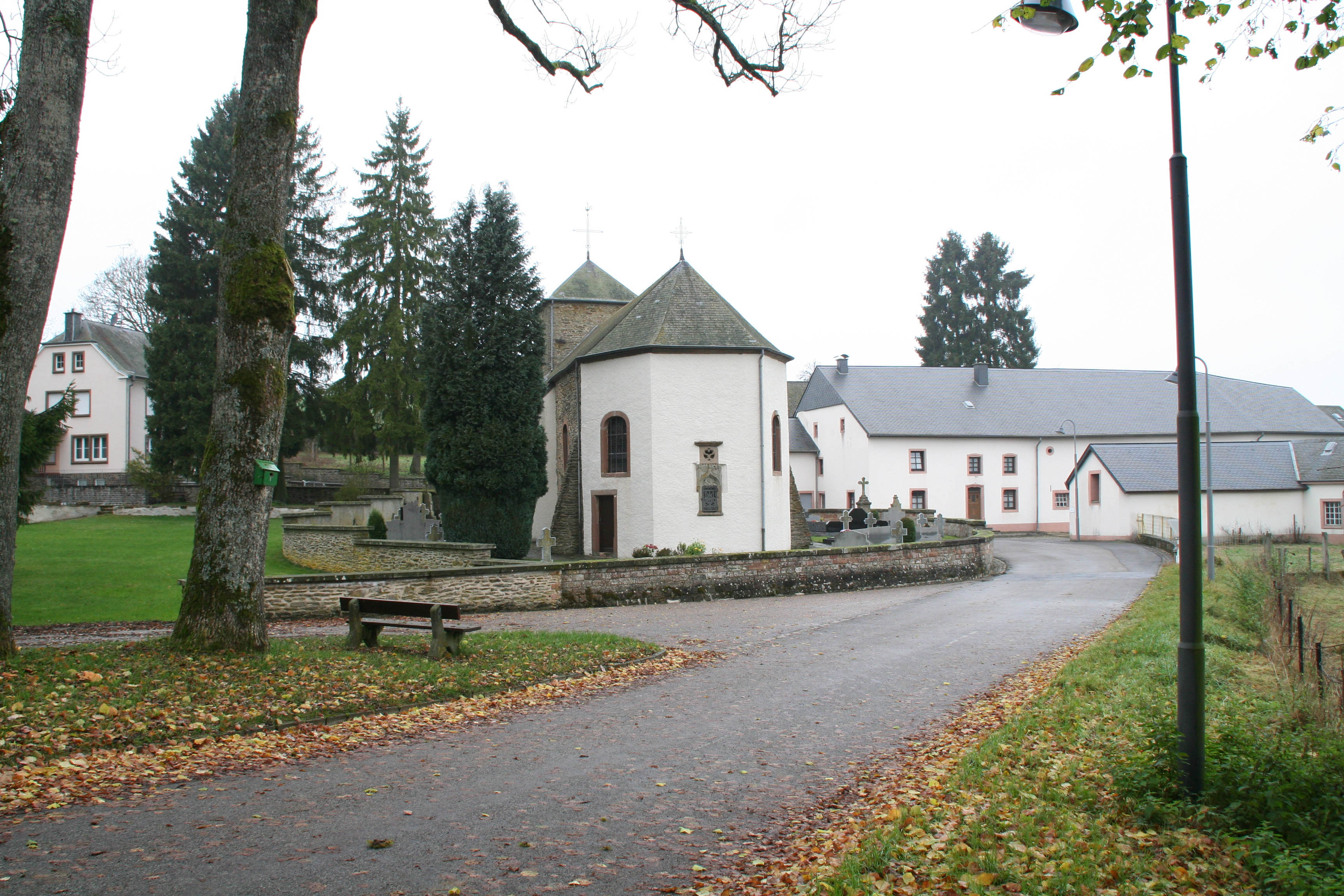
View over Rindschleiden

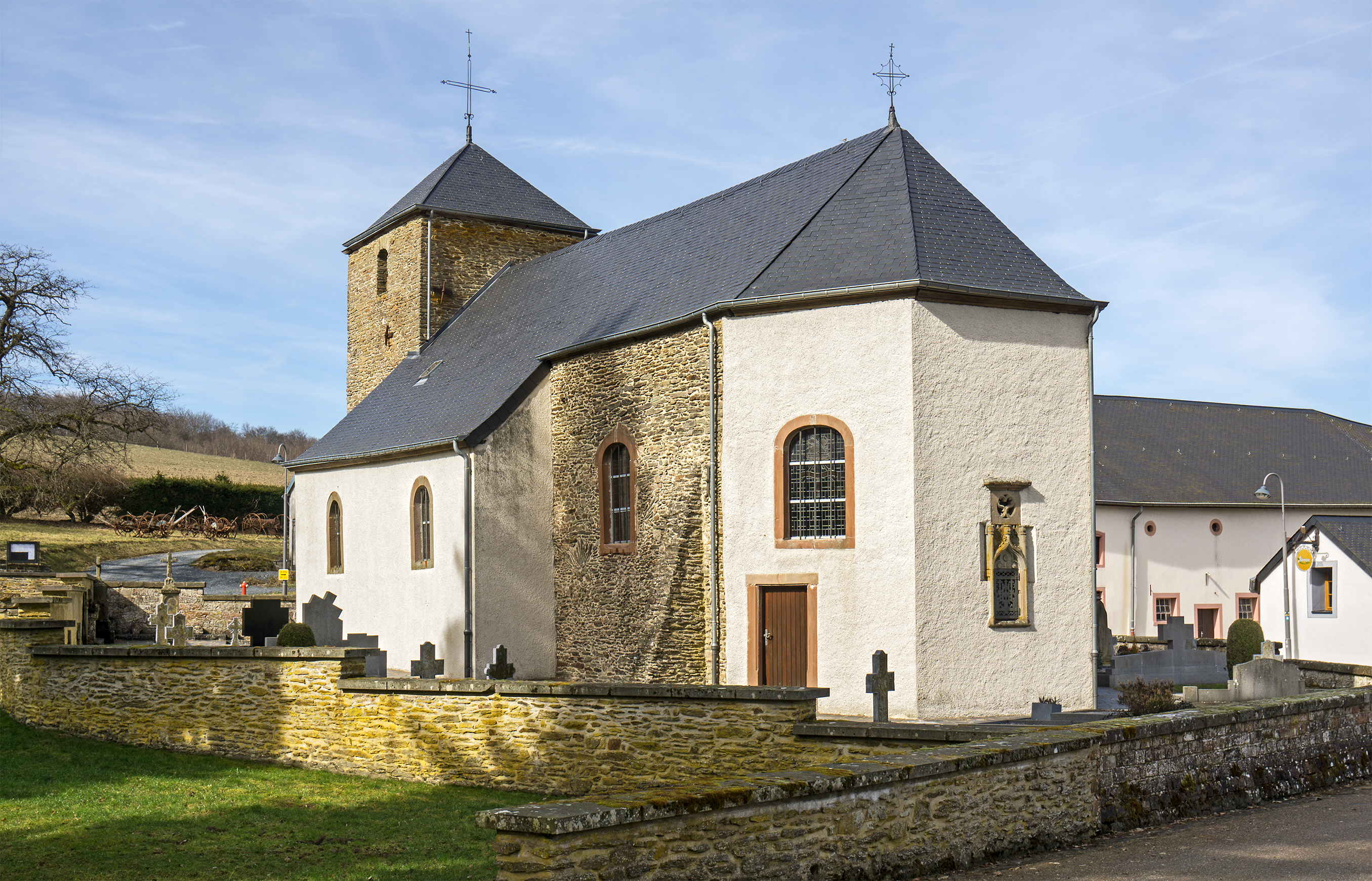
Church in Rindschleiden

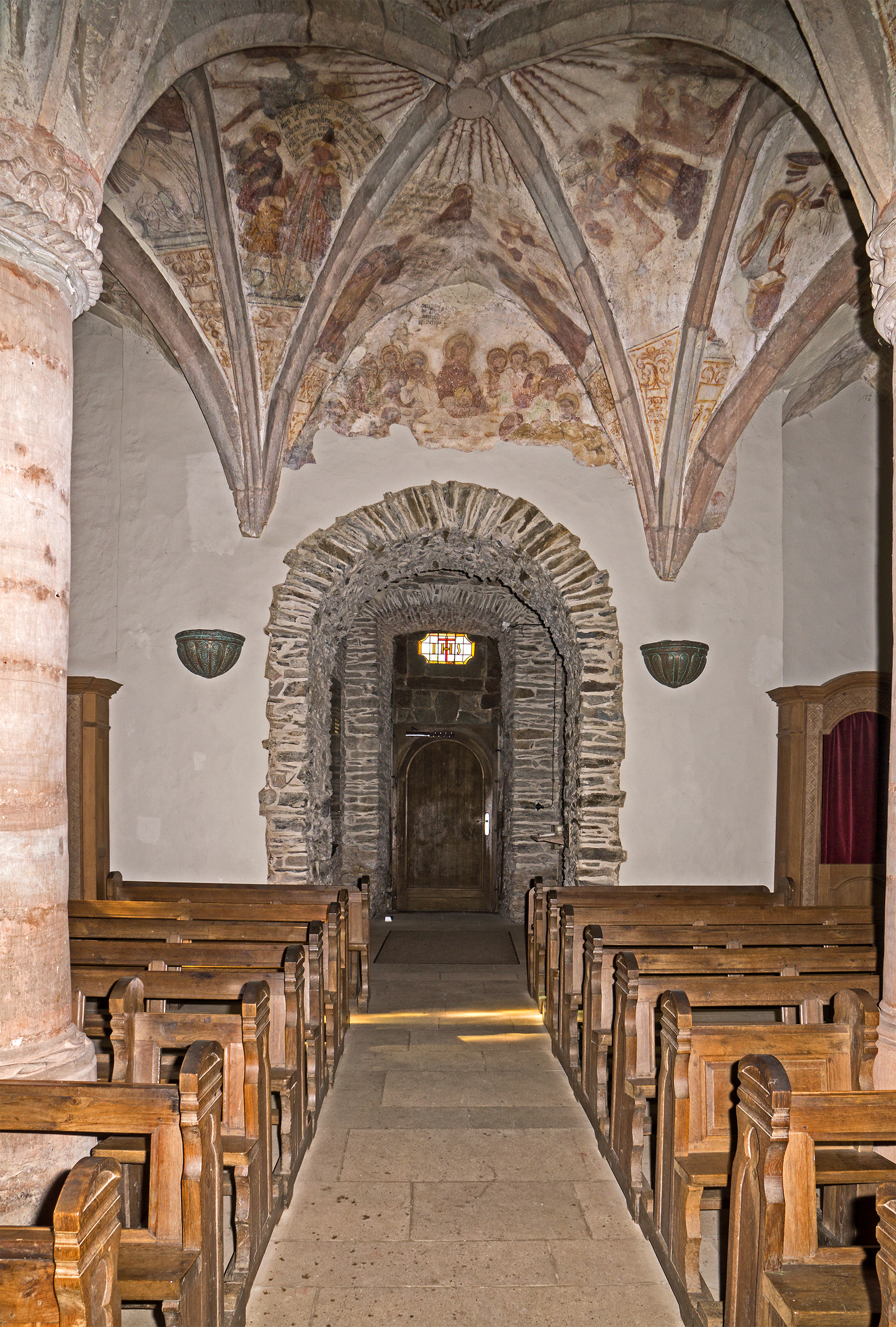
Interior of the church with frescos
