= Dellen, Luxembourg =

Coordinates: 49°52′N 5°58′E

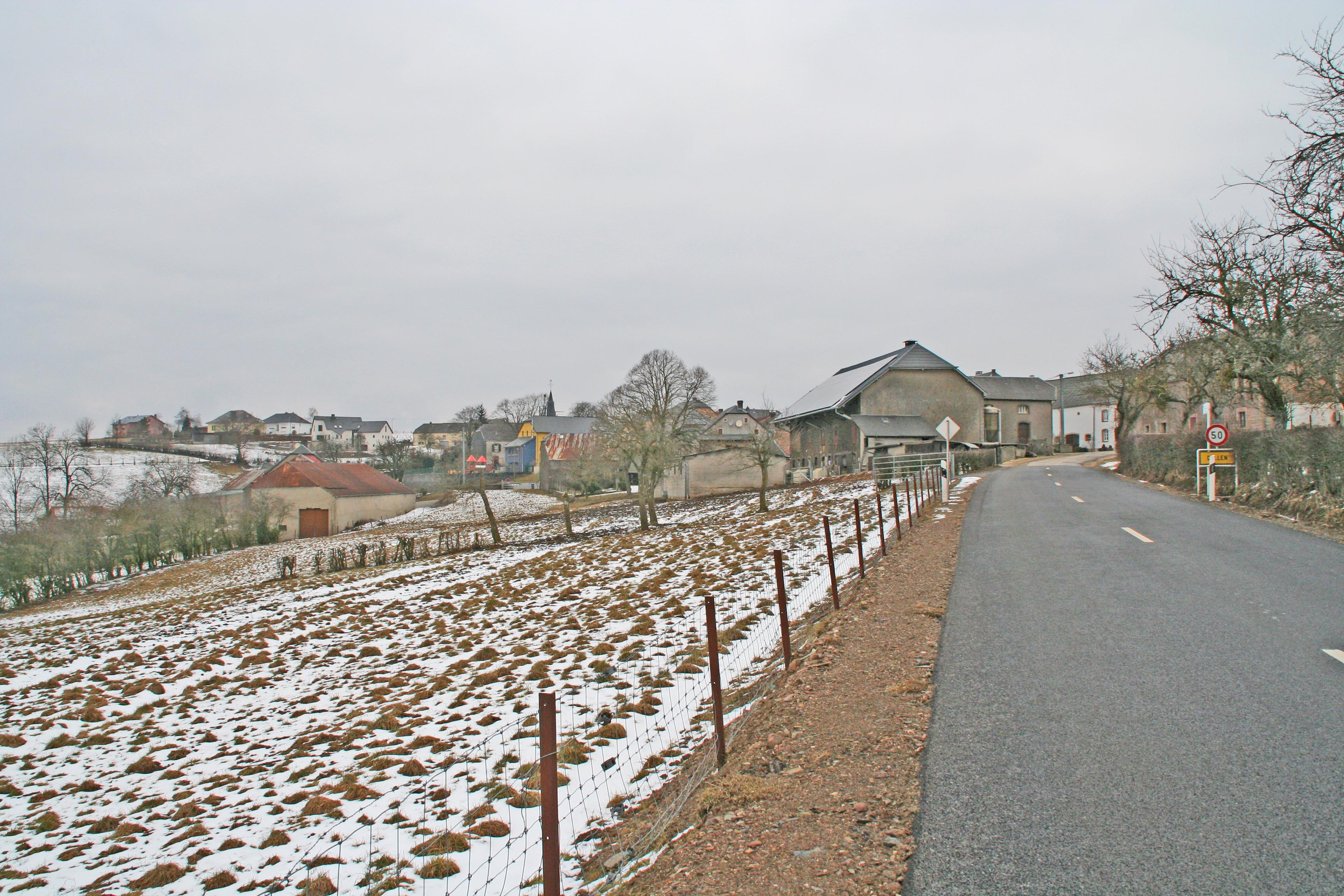
Dellen in winter

Dellen (German pronunciation: [ˈdɛlən]) is a village in the commune of Groussbus-Wal located in western Luxembourg, situated in the canton of Redange. As of September 2026, the village has a population of 114.
