= Hollenfels =

Coordinates: 49°43′N 6°03′E

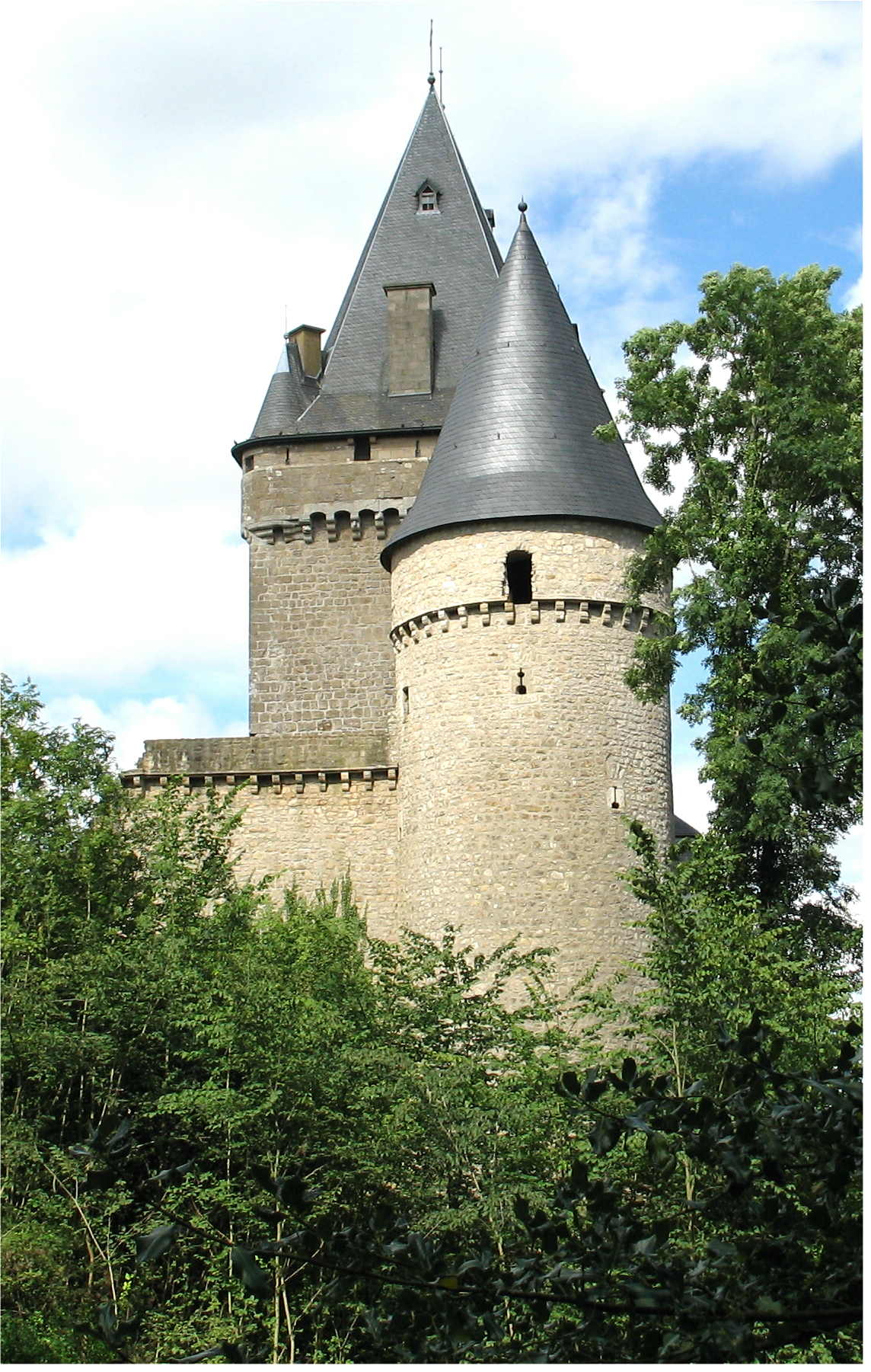
The castle of Hollenfels

Hollenfels (German pronunciation: [ˈhɔlənfɛls]; Luxembourgish: Huelmes) is a village in the commune of Helperknapp, in western Luxembourg. As of September 2026, the village has a population of 544.

Hollenfels is famous for the huge keep of its imposing medieval castle overlooking the valley below.
