= Groussbus-Wal =

- Commune
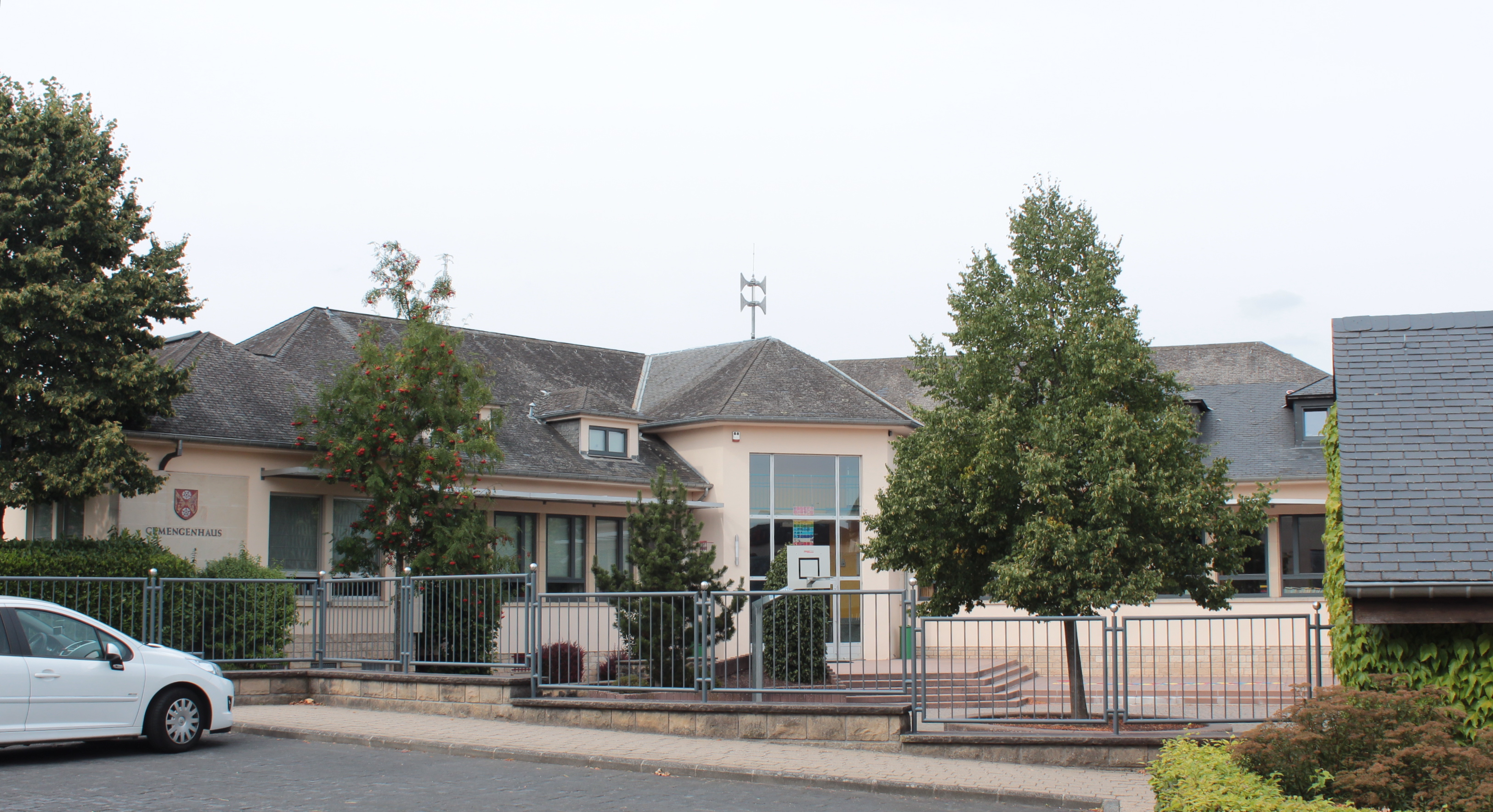
- Town hall of Grosbous-Wal

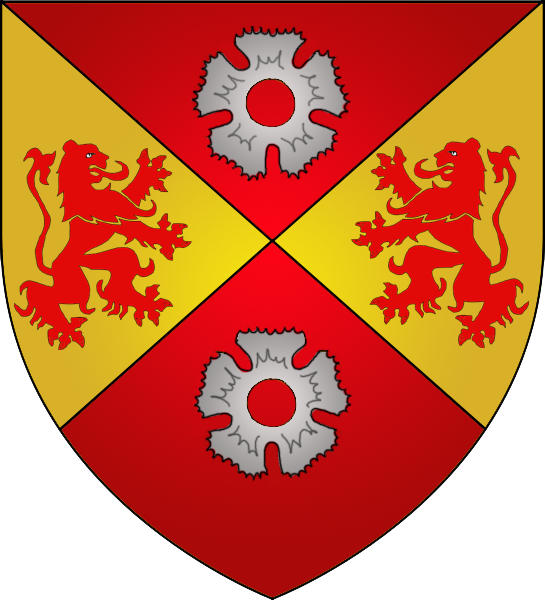
- Coat of arms

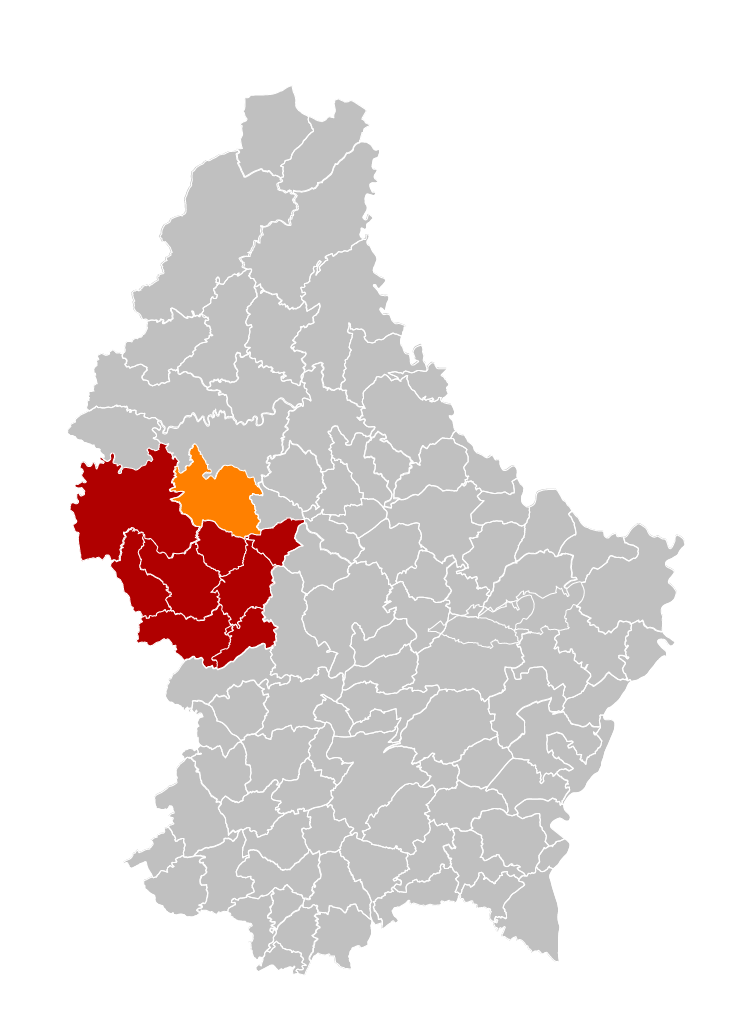
- Map of Luxembourg with Groussbus-Wal highlighted in orange, and the canton in dark red
- Coordinates: 49.8403°N 5.9319°E
- Country: Luxembourg
- Canton: Redange

Government
  - Mayor: Paul Engel

Area
  - Total: 39.85 km^{2} (15.39 sq mi)
  - Rank: ? of 100
- Highest elevation: 544 m (1,785 ft)
  - Rank: ? of 100

Population (2025)
  - Total: 2,352
  - Rank: 73rd of 100
  - Density: 59.02/km^{2} (152.9/sq mi)
  - Rank: 90th of 100
- Time zone: UTC+1 (CET)
  - Summer (DST): UTC+2 (CEST)
- Website: g-w.lu

Groussbus-Wal is a commune in northwestern Luxembourg, in the canton of Redange. It was established on 1 September 2023 with merger of the communes of Grosbous and Wahl. The town of Grosbous, which lies in the south of its former namesake commune, is the main town. Other towns within the commune include Wahl, Dellen, Buschrodt and Grevels.

== History ==
Discussions between Grosbous and its neighboring Commune of Wahl regarding a potential merger began in early 2019. A crucial step in this process was the referendum held on June 27, 2021, where residents of both communes expressed their support for the merger. The majority of voters in both communities were in favor of the fusion, which officially occurred in September 2023, following the municipal elections in June 2023.

== Geography ==
=== Populated places ===
The commune consists of the following localities. The communal seat is shown in bold:

- Grosbous Section:
  - Dellen
  - Grevels (Gréiwels)
  - **Grosbous** (Groussbus)
  - Lehrhof (Léierhaff)

- Wahl Section:
  - Brattert
  - Buschrodt (Bëschrued)
  - Heispelt (Heeschpelt)
  - Kuborn (Kéiber)
  - Rindschleiden (Randschelt) (Note: Considered as the smallest populated place in the nation of Luxembourg.)
  - Wahl (Wal)
  - Nei Brasilien (lieu-dit)
  - Kinnekshaff (lieu-dit)
  - Ënnescht Millen (lieu-dit)
  - Réidingshaff (lieu-dit)
  - Ringbaach (lieu-dit)
