= Buschrodt =

Coordinates: 49°50′N 5°56′E

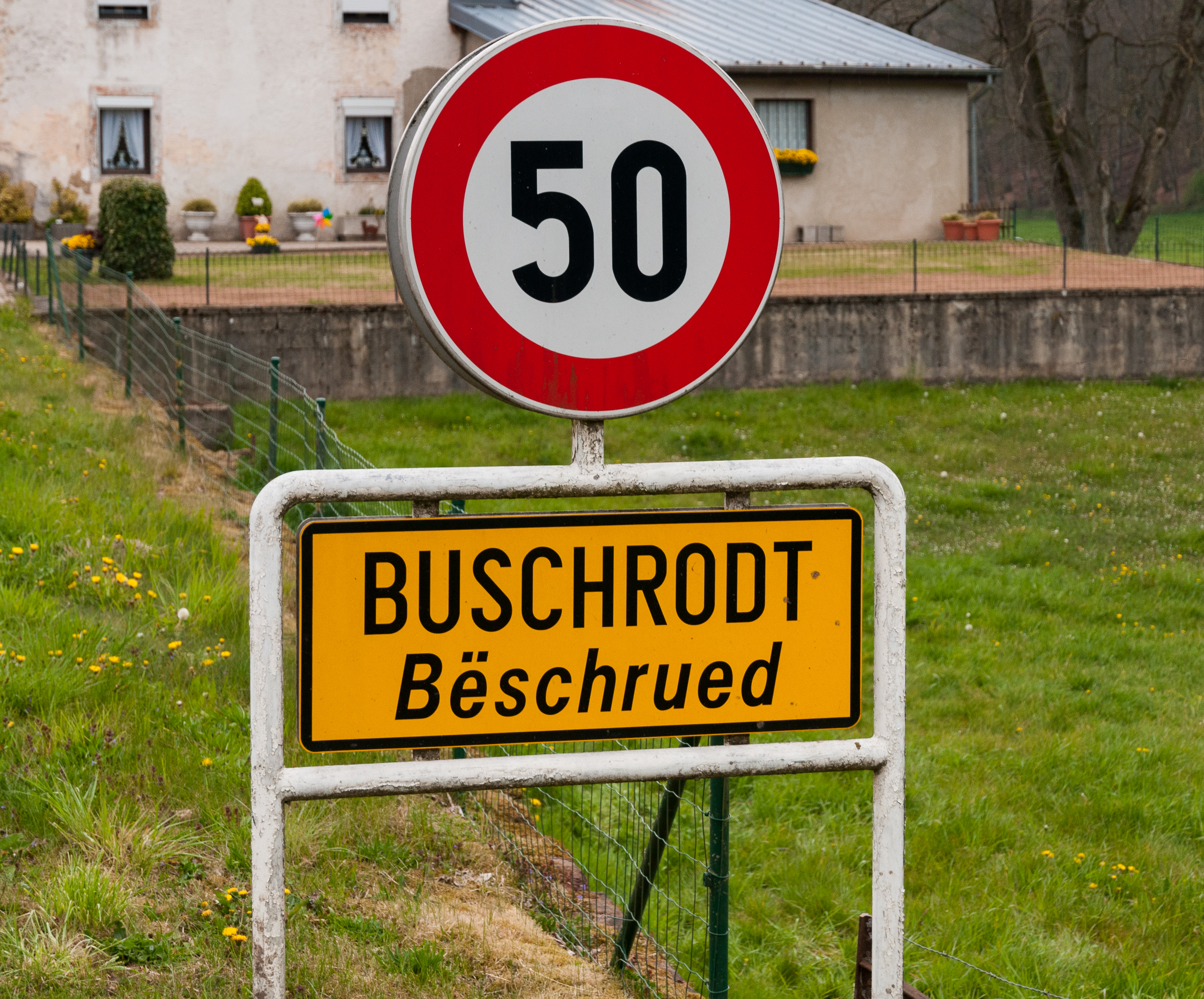

Buschrodt (German pronunciation: [ˈbʊʃʁoːt]; Luxembourgish: Bëschrued) is a village in the commune of Groussbus-Wal, in western Luxembourg. As of 2023, the village had a population of 124.
