= Bour, Luxembourg =

Village in Helperknapp, Luxembourg

Bour Bur
- Village
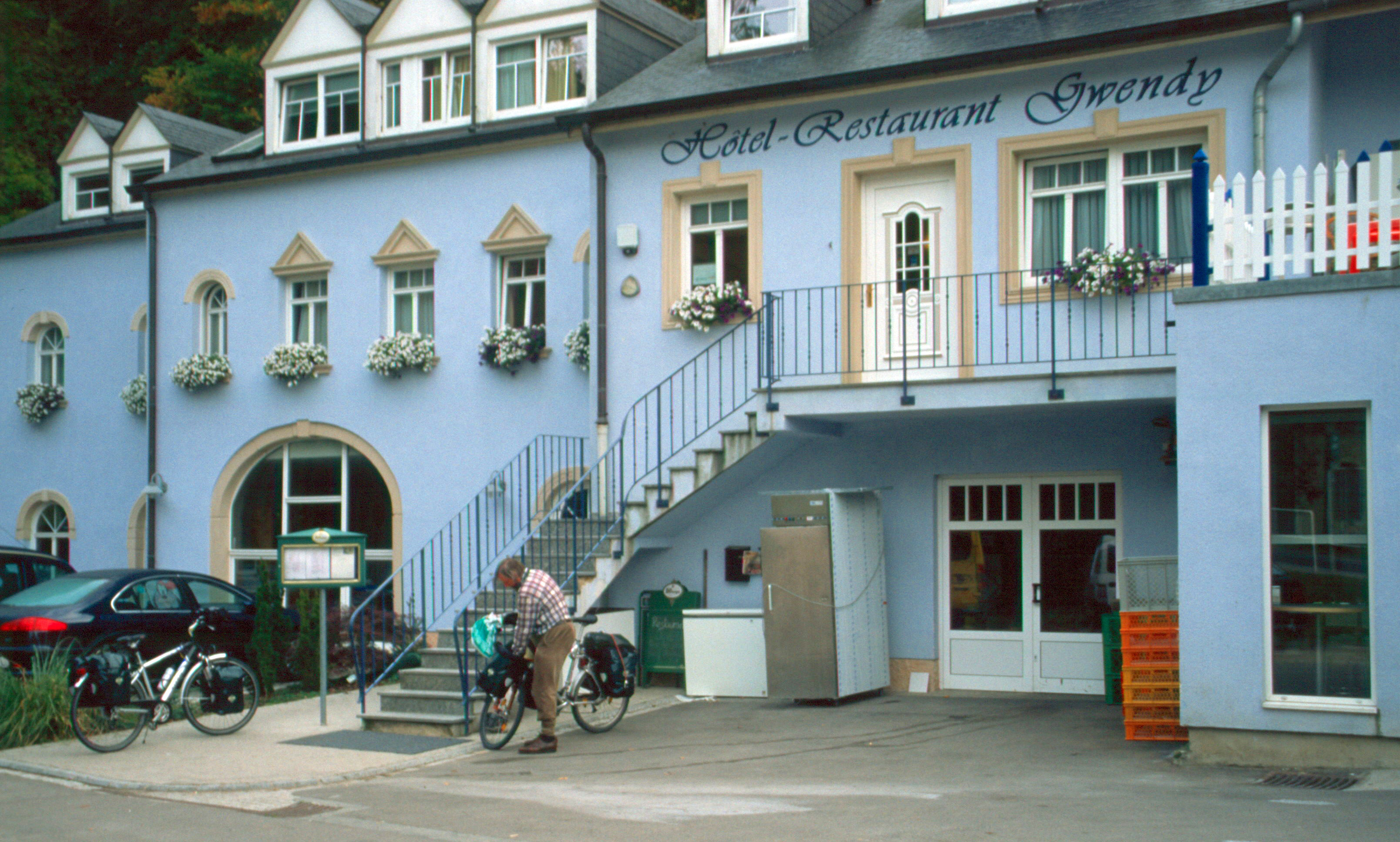
- Bour in Luxembourg

- Location in Luxembourg
- Coordinates: 49°42′05″N 6°01′08″E
- Country: Luxembourg
- Canton: Mersch
- Commune: Helperknapp

Population (2024)
  - Total: 78

Bour (French pronunciation: [buʁ]; Luxembourgish: Bur) is a village in the commune of Helperknapp, in western Luxembourg. As of September 2026, the town has a population of 67.
