= Buschdorf =

Town in Luxembourg

Coordinates: 49°45′N 6°00′E

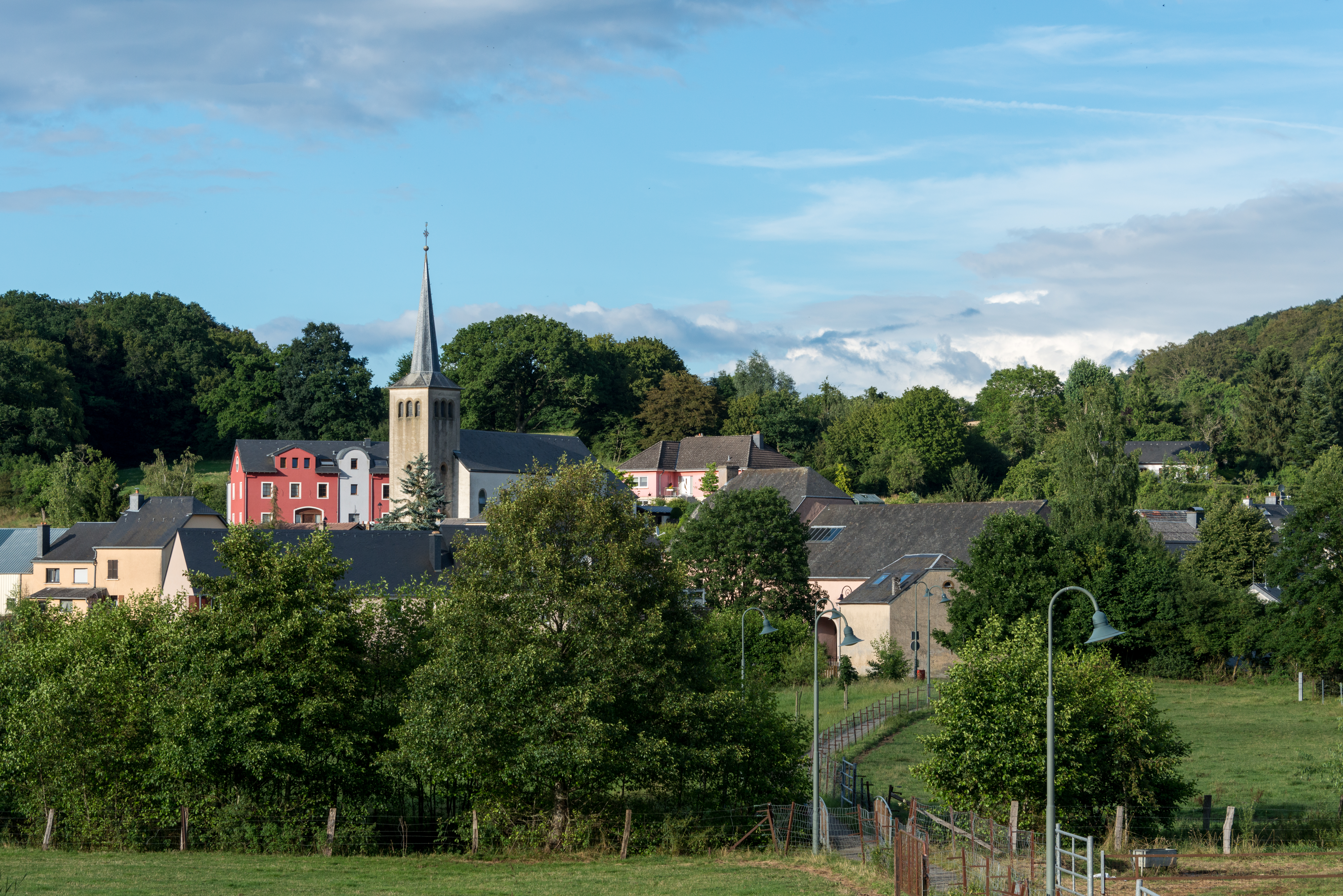

Buschdorf (German pronunciation: [ˈbʊʃdɔʁf]; Luxembourgish: Bëschdref) is a small town in the commune of Helperknapp, in western Luxembourg. As of September 2026, the town has a population of 599.
