= Hollenfels Castle =

Coordinates: 49°43′N 6°03′E

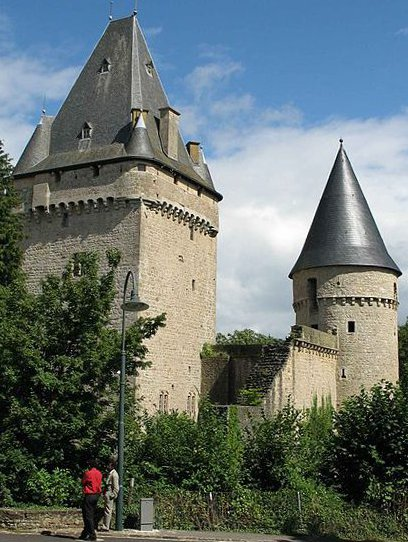
Hollenfels Castle

Hollenfels Castle (Luxembourgish: Buerg Huelmes; French: Château de Hollenfels; German: Burg Hollenfels), with a history dating back to the 11th century, is one of the castles located close to the River Eisch in the Valley of the Seven Castles in central Luxembourg. Today it is used as a centre for activities for young people, including a nearby youth hostel.

== Location ==
Located at the southern end of the village of Hollenfels, the castle stands high above the River Eisch. A path with steep steps and wooden bridges leads to the foot of the castle where hollows in the rock can be seen, explaining the origin of the castle's name which literally means "hollow cliff". Indeed, there are several tunnels running through the cliffs below the castle. Access to the castle is by means of a brick bridge over the defensive ditch.

== History ==
The first mention of Hollenfels was in 1129 when Ludolf, Lord of Hollenfels, was given the water rights of the abbey of Marienthal which lies just 400 metres away. The majestic tower, 39 metres tall, with its sumptuous Gothic rooms reached by means of a spiral staircase was built in 1380. At the lowest level is the oven room, next comes the servants dining room, then the Gothic Room for the lords of the castle together with a chapel, sometimes used as a bedroom, and finally the armory at the top. The rooms have impressive fireplaces, windows set back in the sturdy walls and a number of sculptures.

Until 1477, the castle belonged to the lords of Hollenfeld and Elter. It then successively became the property of Raville of Ansembourg, Greiffenklau, Raugraves of Salm, von Thinner, von Hohenstein and Brouckhoven-Hohenstein. In the 1680s, the castle was captured by the French, taken back by the Spaniards and finally recaptured by the French. The mansion on the north-eastern side of the keep was added in 1729 and was restyled with a Baroque finish in 1921. In 1929, when the castle was falling into ruin, restoration work was carried out by the Luxembourg architect J. Schoenberg. Between 1945 and 1948, the castle was used as a camp for prisoners of war. In 1948, the Luxembourg State acquired the building and created a youth hostel there.

== The castle today ==
Today the castle houses State facilities directed towards improving the education of young people. Open throughout the year, the services allow young people to experience the historic building while coming in close contact with nature. The conditions are enhanced by the nearby youth hostel.

== See also ==
- List of castles in Luxembourg
