= Helperknapp =

- Commune
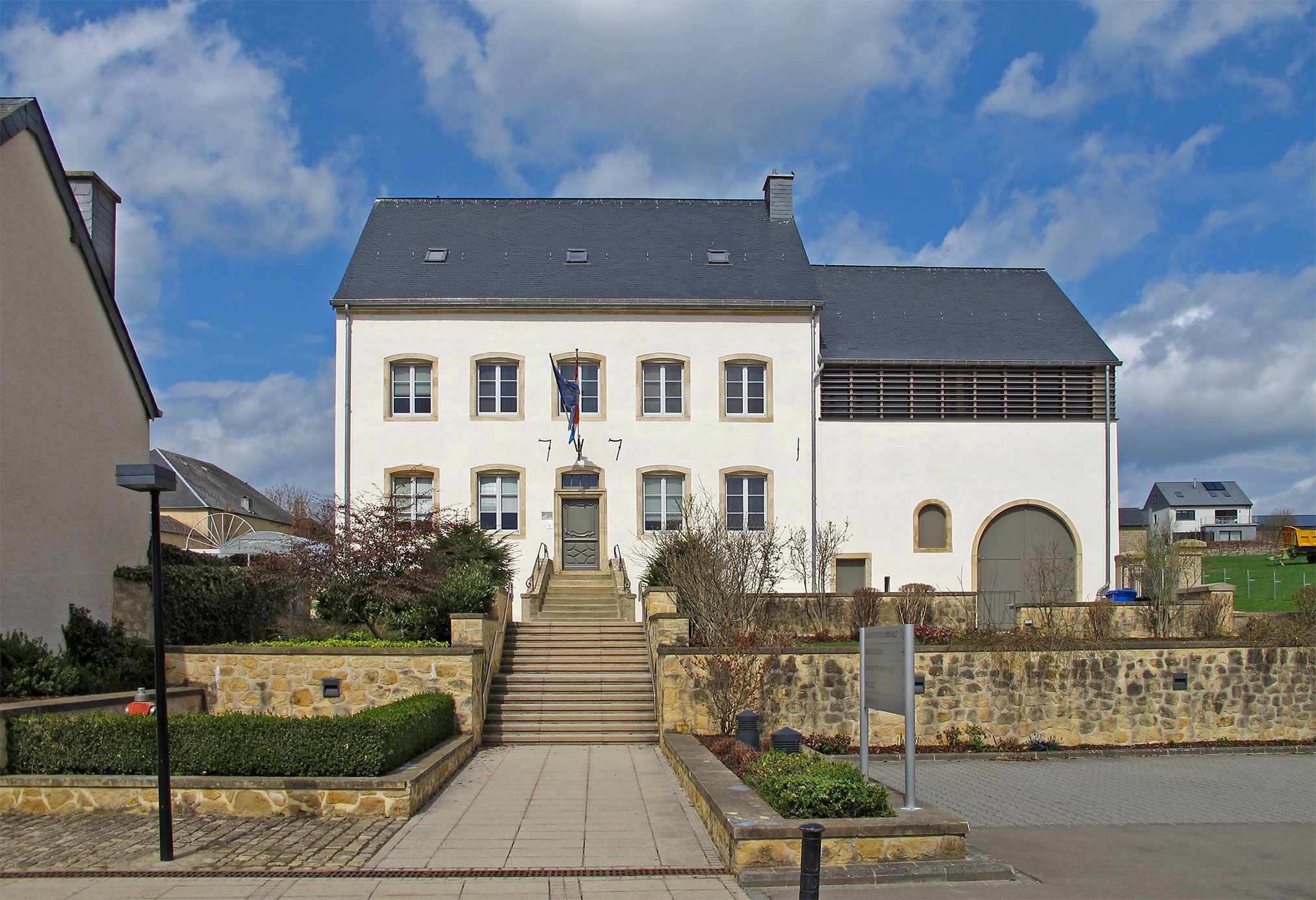

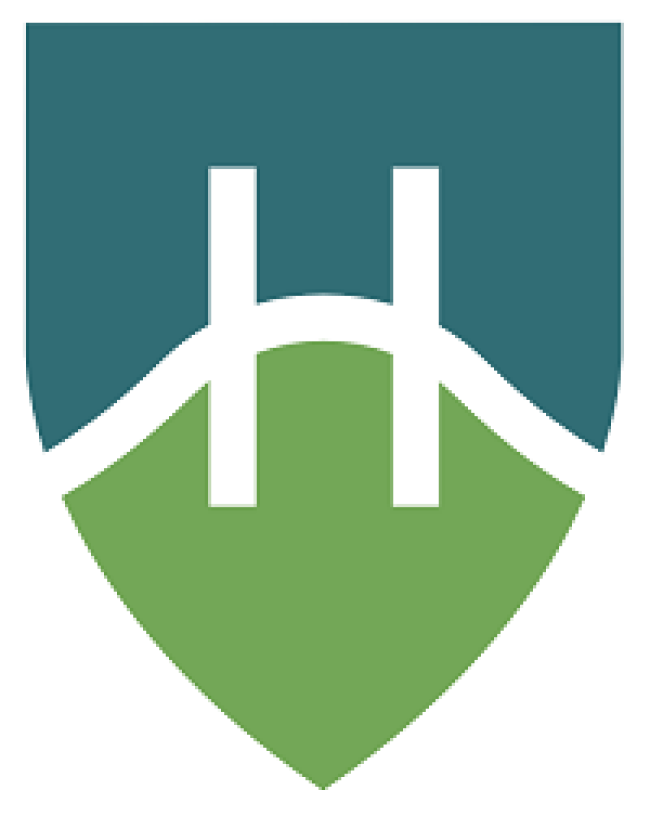
- Brandmark

- Map of Luxembourg with Helperknapp highlighted in orange, and the canton in dark red
- Coordinates: 49°43′2″N 6°0′38″E
- Country: Luxembourg
- Canton: Mersch

Government
  - Mayor: Paul Mangen

Area
  - Total: 37.61 km^{2} (14.52 sq mi)
  - Rank: 16th of 100
- Highest elevation: 393 m (1,289 ft)
  - Rank: 56th of 100
- Lowest elevation: 225 m (738 ft)
  - Rank: 38th of 100

Population (2025)
  - Total: 5,289
  - Rank: 35th of 100
  - Density: 140.6/km^{2} (364.2/sq mi)
  - Rank: 58th of 100
- Time zone: UTC+1 (CET)
  - Summer (DST): UTC+2 (CEST)
- LAU 2: LU0000403

Helperknapp is a commune in central Luxembourg, in the canton of Mersch. It was established on 1 January 2018 from the amalgamation of the communes of Boevange-sur-Attert and Tuntange.

== Populated places ==
The commune consists of the following villages:

Boevange-sur-Attert Section:

- Bill
- Boevange-sur-Attert
- Brouch
- Buschdorf
- Grevenknapp
- Fënsterdall
- Obenthalt
- Brichermillen (lieu-dit)
- Fënsterdallerhéicht (lieu-dit)
- Helperknapp (lieu-dit)

Tuntange Section:

- Ansembourg
- Bour
- Hollenfels
- Marienthal
- Tuntange (seat)
- Claushof (lieu-dit)
- Kalbacherhof (lieu-dit)
- Marienthalerhof (lieu-dit)

== History ==
In two referendums held simultaneously in Boevange-sur-Attert and Tuntange on 25 May 2014, the citizens of both communes approved a municipal merger, with 69.51% and 64.09%, respectively, in favour. Based on the poll, legislators of the two communes voted in favor of the merger. Consequently, on January 1, 2018, Boevange-sur-Attert and Tuntange were subsumed into the new municipality of Helperknapp. The name "Helperknapp" derives from the name of a hill of the same name located within the commune.

== Population ==
Historical population

| Year | Pop. | ±% |
|---|---|---|
| 1821 | 1,705 | — |
| 1851 | 2,447 | +43.5% |
| 1900 | 1,859 | −24.0% |
| 1910 | 1,793 | −3.6% |
| 1922 | 1,762 | −1.7% |
| 1935 | 1,749 | −0.7% |

| Year | Pop. | ±% |
|---|---|---|
| 1947 | 1,629 | −6.9% |
| 1960 | 1,475 | −9.5% |
| 1970 | 1,446 | −2.0% |
| 1981 | 1,752 | +21.2% |
| 1990 | 2,129 | +21.5% |
| 2000 | 2,715 | +27.5% |

| Year | Pop. | ±% |
|---|---|---|
| 2005 | 2,868 | +5.6% |
| 2010 | 3,140 | +9.5% |
| 2015 | 3,776 | +20.3% |
| 2020 | 4,387 | +16.2% |
| 2021 | 4,538 | +3.4% |

Source data

== Twin towns ==
Helperknapp is twinned with:

- Zechin, Germany
