= Heispelt =

Village in Luxembourg

Coordinates: 49°51′18″N 5°52′55″E

Heispelt Heeschpelt
- Village
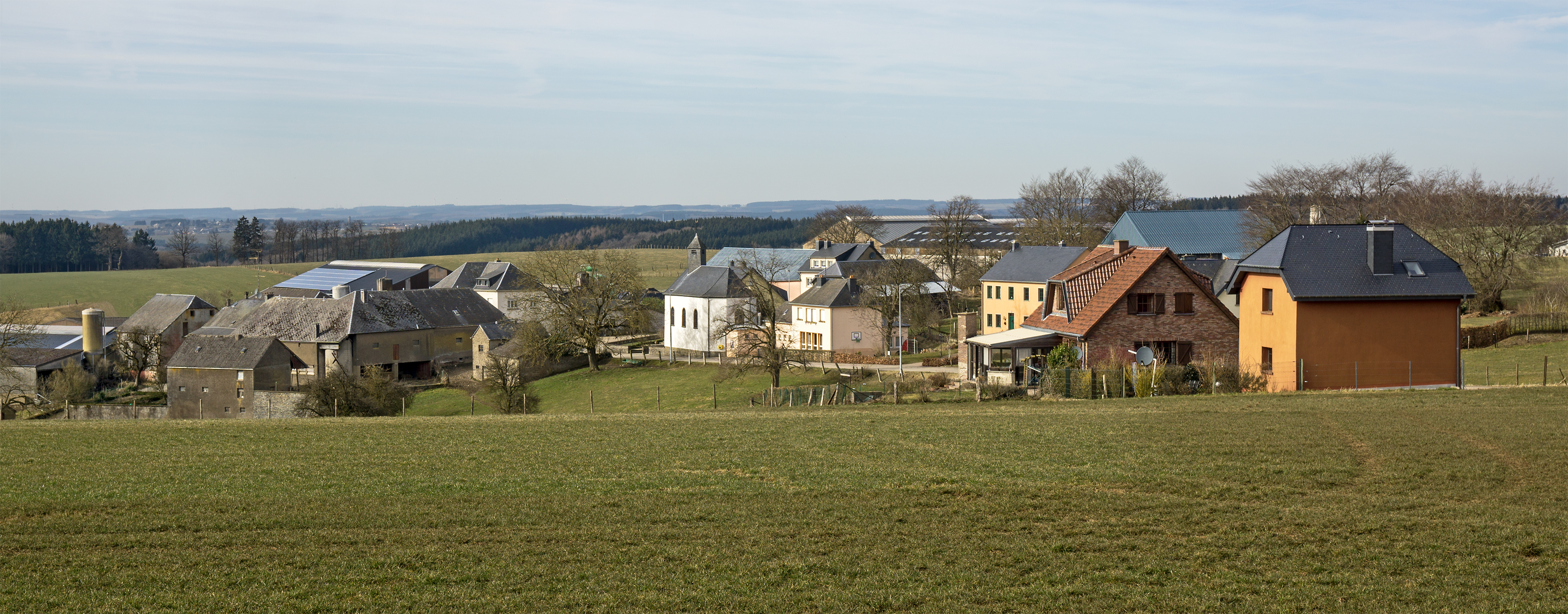
- View over Heispelt
- Interactive map of Heispelt
- Country: Luxembourg
- Canton: Redange
- Commune: Groussbus-Wal

Population
  - Total: 120
- Time zone: UTC+1 (CET)
  - Summer (DST): UTC+2 (CEST)

Heispelt (Luxembourgish: Heeschpelt) is a village in northwestern Luxembourg.

It is situated in the commune of Groussbus-Wal and has a population of 118 as of 2026.

== Gallery ==
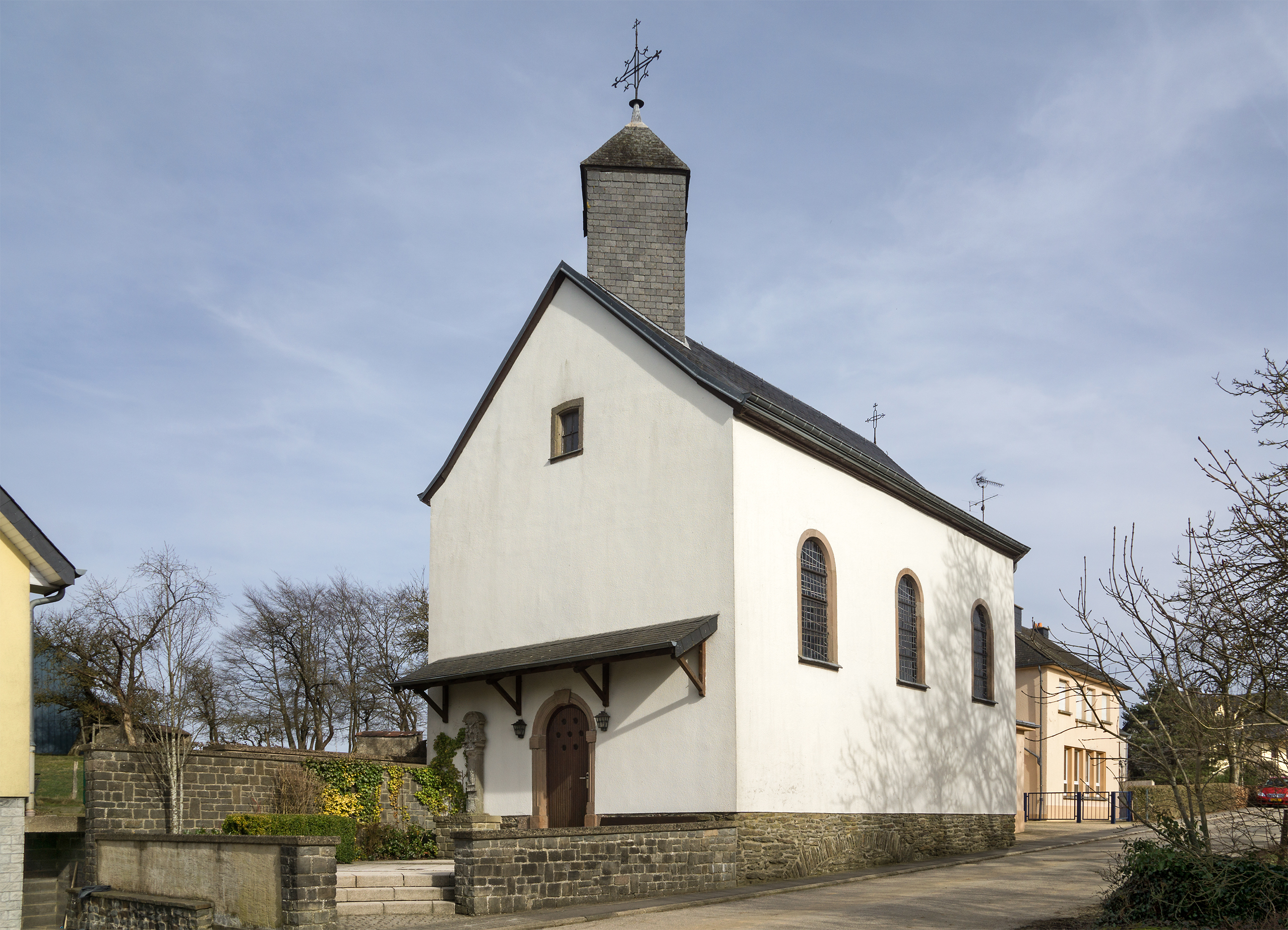
Chapel of Heispelt

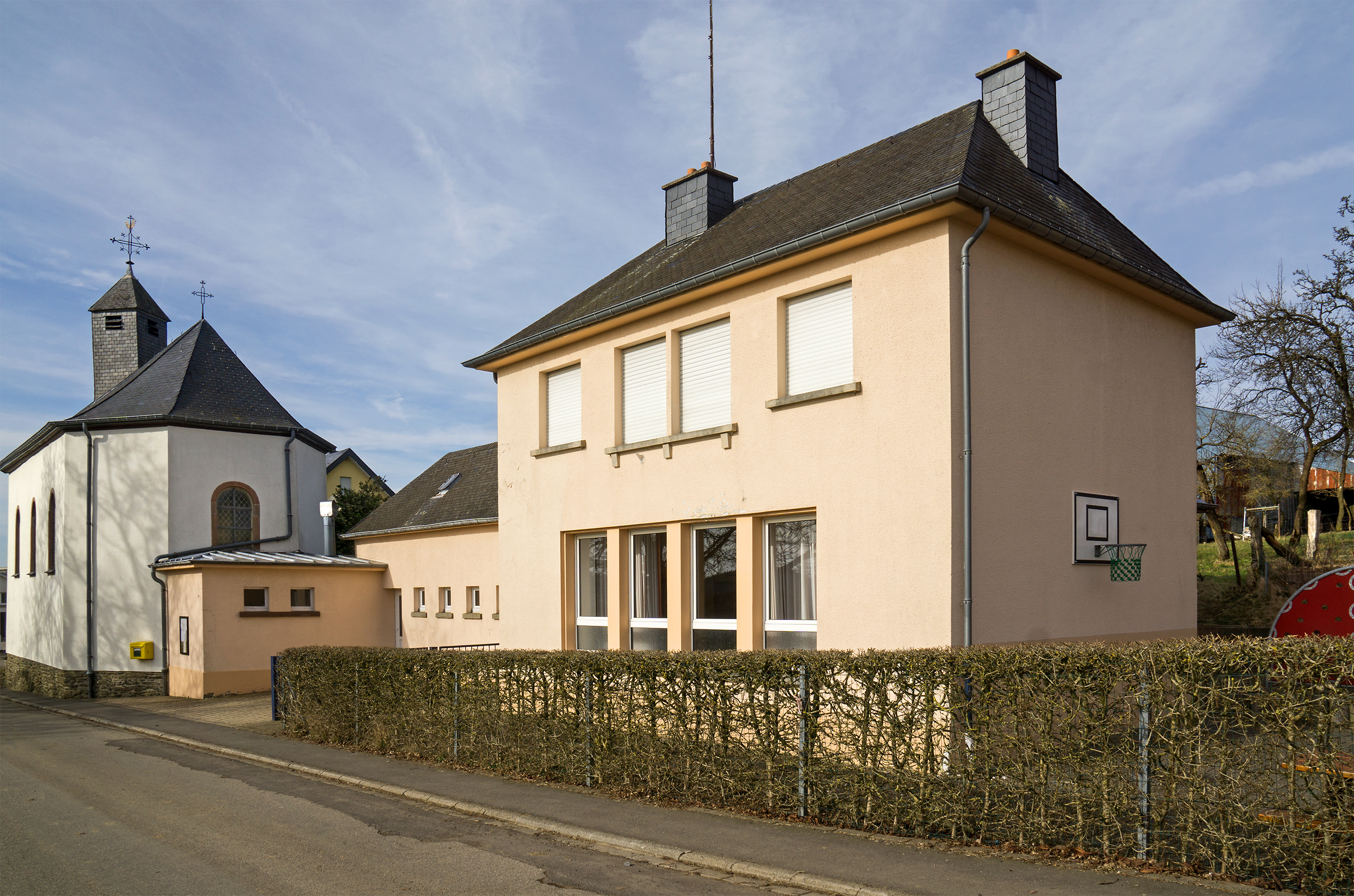
School in Heispelt
