= Canton of Mersch =

Canton of Mersch Kanton Miersch (Luxembourgish) Kanton Mersch (German) Canton de Mersch (French)
- Canton
- Coat of arms

- Coordinates: 49°42′N 6°6′E
- Country: Luxembourg
- Legislative constituency: Centre
- LAU 1: LU00004
- Communes (cities in bold): Bissen; Colmar-Berg; Fischbach; Heffingen; Helperknapp; Larochette; Lintgen; Lorentzweiler; Mersch; Nommern

Area
  - Total: 223.9 km^{2} (86.4 sq mi)
  - Rank: 6th of 12
- Highest elevation (6th of 12): 436 m (1,430 ft)
- Lowest elevation (6th of 12): 201 m (659 ft)

Population (2026)
  - Total: 37,191
  - Rank: 5th of 12
  - Density: 166.1/km^{2} (430.2/sq mi)
  - Rank: 6th of 12

Mersch (Luxembourgish: Miersch) is a canton in the centre of Luxembourg. It is the only canton, other than Luxembourg, to be entirely surrounded by other cantons, and therefore not to have an international boundary.

== Administrative divisions ==
Mersch Canton consists of the following ten communes:

- Bissen
- Colmar-Berg
- Fischbach
- Heffingen
- Helperknapp
- Larochette
- Lintgen
- Lorentzweiler
- Mersch
- Nommern

== Mergers ==
- On 1 January 2018 the former communes of Boevange-sur-Attert and Tuntange were merged to create the commune of Helperknapp. The name "Helperknapp" derives from the name of a hill of the same name located within the commune.

== Population ==
Historical population

| Year | Pop. | ±% |
|---|---|---|
| 1821 | 10,542 | — |
| 1851 | 15,028 | +42.6% |
| 1900 | 12,612 | −16.1% |
| 1910 | 12,274 | −2.7% |
| 1922 | 12,316 | +0.3% |
| 1935 | 12,714 | +3.2% |

| Year | Pop. | ±% |
|---|---|---|
| 1947 | 12,447 | −2.1% |
| 1960 | 12,109 | −2.7% |
| 1970 | 13,814 | +14.1% |
| 1981 | 16,542 | +19.7% |
| 1990 | 18,970 | +14.7% |
| 2000 | 22,660 | +19.5% |

| Year | Pop. | ±% |
|---|---|---|
| 2005 | 24,268 | +7.1% |
| 2010 | 26,213 | +8.0% |
| 2015 | 29,867 | +13.9% |
| 2020 | 33,326 | +11.6% |
| 2021 | 34,063 | +2.2% |

Source data
