= Marienthal, Luxembourg =

Coordinates: 49.710°N 6.062°E

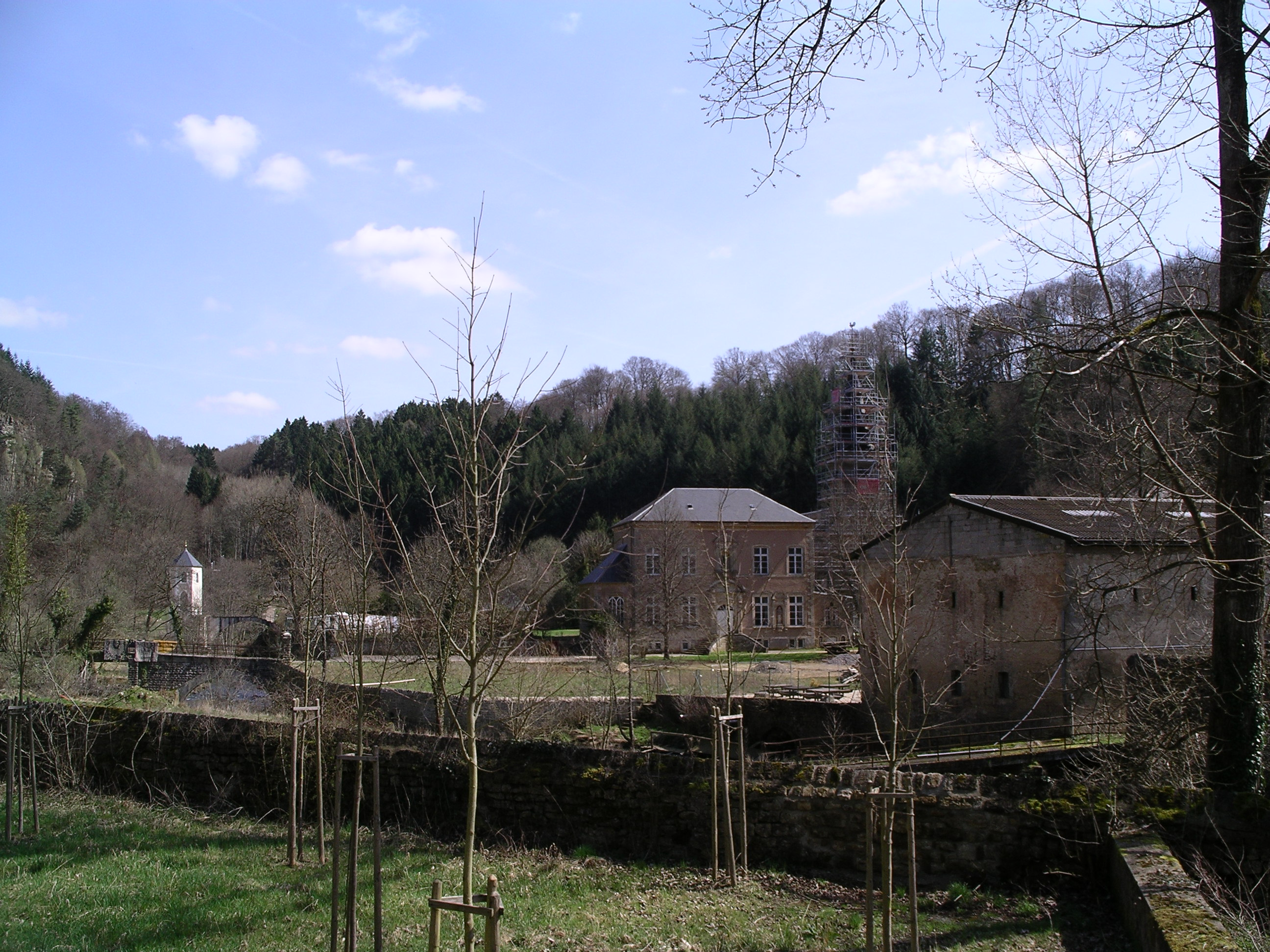
Marienthal monastery

Marienthal (German pronunciation: [maˈʁiːənˌtaːl]; Luxembourgish: Mariendall) is a village in the commune of Helperknapp, in western Luxembourg. As of September 2026, the village has a population of 127. It is known for its former monastery, of which a few buildings remain.
