= Bour (surname) =

Bour is a surname. Notable people with the surname include:

- Edmond Bour (1832–1866), French engineer
- Ernest Bour (1913–2001), French conductor
- Elliot M. Bour (born 1969), American director, animator, and actor
- Igor Bour (born 1984), Moldavian weightlifter
- Justin Bour (born 1988), American professional baseball player
