= Grevels =

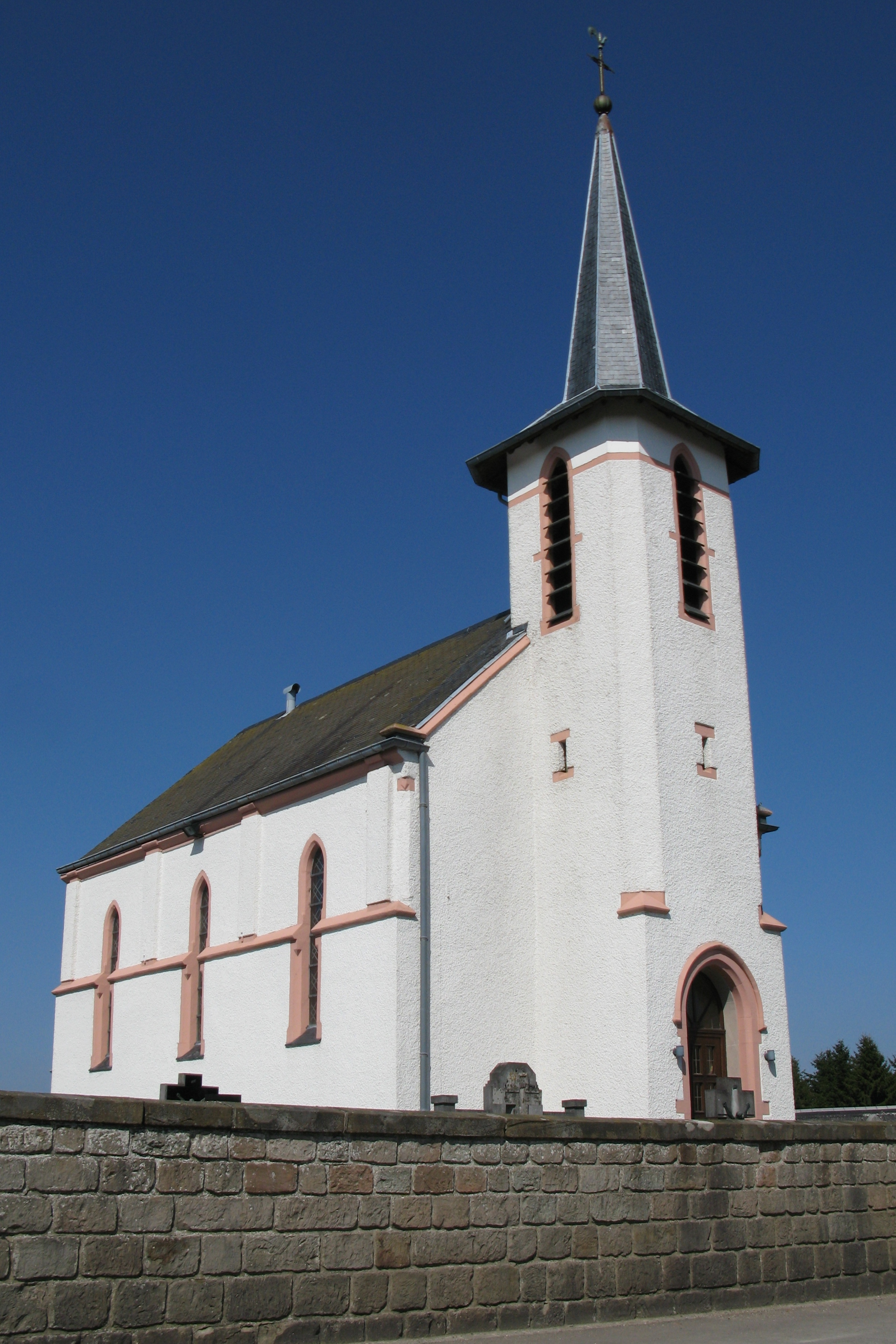

- Location within Luxembourg
- Coordinates: 49°51′N 5°55′E

Grevels (Luxembourgish: Gréiwels) is a small town in the commune of Groussbus-Wal, in western Luxembourg. As of September 2026, the town has a population of 305. Nearby is the source of the Wark.
