= Communes of Luxembourg =

Aspect of Luxembourgish geography

The 100 communes of Luxembourg as of 2023.

Luxembourg's 100 communes (Luxembourgish: Gemengen [ɡəˈmæŋən]; French: communes; German: Gemeinden) conform to LAU Level 2 and are the country's lowest administrative divisions.

Communes rank below cantons in Luxembourg's hierarchy of administrative subdivisions. Communes are often re-arranged, being merged or divided as demanded by demographic change over time. Unlike the cantons, which have remained unchanged since their creation, the identity of the communes has not become ingrained within the geographical sensations of the average Luxembourger. The cantons are responsible for the ceremonial, administrative, and statistical aspects of government, while the communes provide local government services.

The municipal system was adopted when Luxembourg was annexed into the French département of Forêts in 1795. Despite ownership passing to the Netherlands, this system was maintained until it was introduced upon independence in 1843. The province of Luxembourg, which now constitutes part of Belgium, was part of Luxembourg prior to 1839 when it possessed a low degree of sovereignty. Due to Luxembourg's incorporation into the main country by its occupying powers, the modern municipal system in Luxembourg is less than two centuries old.

== Terminology ==
Luxembourg has three administrative languages: French, German, and the national language, Luxembourgish.

| Language | Type name (sg./pl.) |
|---|---|
| Luxembourgish | Gemeng/Gemengen |
| French | commune/communes |
| German | Gemeinde/Gemeinden |

== Authority ==
The communes have no legislative control over matters relating to the national interest, which reside solely with the Chamber of Deputies. Below this level, however, they have wide-ranging powers. The communes provide public education, maintain the local road network and other infrastructure, ensure basic public health, and provide most social security. Communes also have discretionary powers for comprehensive health care (including maintenance of hospitals and clinics) within their borders, land-use planning, funds for cultural activities, provision of care to the elderly, and providing a sufficient supply of water, gas, and electricity.

== Communes and cities ==
The cities of Luxembourg, colored in orange.

There are currently 100 communes in the 12 cantons. The 12 communes with city status are Diekirch, Differdange, Dudelange, Echternach, Esch-sur-Alzette, Ettelbruck, Grevenmacher, Luxembourg, Remich, Rumelange, Vianden, and Wiltz.

== Creation of communes after independence ==
- On 1 July 1849 the commune of Rollingergrund was created from the commune of Eich by law on 8 May 1849
- On 1 January 1850 the commune of Strassen was created from the commune of Bertrange by law on 6 August 1849
- On 1 July 1850 the communes of Schieren and Erpeldange were created from the commune of Ettelbruck by law on 22 January 1850
- On 1 January 1851 the commune of Walferdange was created from the commune of Steinsel by law of 25 November 1850
- On 1 July 1853 the commune of Kopstal was created from the parts of the communes of Kehlen and Steinsel by law of 22 February 1853
- On 1 July 1856 the commune of Leudelange was created from the commune of Reckange by law of 3 March 1856
- On 1 January 1874 the commune of Hamm was created from the commune of Sandweiler by law of 20 December 1873
- On 30 December 1874 the commune of Mertzig was created from the commune of Feulen by law of 20 November 1874
- On 15 August 1876 the commune of Schifflange was created from the commune of Esch-sur-Alzette by law of 6 July 1876
- On 25 September 1891 the commune of Rumelange was created from the commune of Kayl by law of 27 June 1891

== Former communes ==
Since the creation of the communes system, eight communes have changed their name and forty-eight communes have been merged, resulting in the 100 communes that exist today. These defunct communes are listed in the table below.

| Name | Year dissolved | Reason |
|---|---|---|
| Weicherdange | 1823 | merged into Clervaux |
| Hunsdorf | 1823 | merged into Lorentzweiler |
| Stolzembourg | 1826 | merged to form Putscheid |
| Landscheid | 1826 | merged to form Putscheid |
| Oberpallen | 1846 | merged into Beckerich |
| Eich | 1920 | merged into Luxembourg City |
| Hamm | 1920 | merged into Luxembourg City |
| Hollerich | 1920 | merged into Luxembourg City |
| Rollingergrund | 1920 | merged into Luxembourg City |
| Asselborn | 1978 | merged to form Wincrange |
| Boevange | 1978 | merged to form Wincrange |
| Hachiville | 1978 | merged to form Wincrange |
| Oberwampach | 1978 | merged to form Wincrange |
| Rodenbourg | 1979 | merged into Junglinster |
| Harlange | 1979 | merged to form Lac de la Haute-Sûre |
| Mecher | 1979 | merged to form Lac de la Haute-Sûre |
| Arsdorf | 1979 | merged to form Rambrouch |
| Bigonville | 1979 | merged to form Rambrouch |
| Folschette | 1979 | merged to form Rambrouch |
| Perlé | 1979 | merged to form Rambrouch |
| Kautenbach | 2006 | merged to form Kiischpelt |
| Wilwerwiltz | 2006 | merged to form Kiischpelt |
| Bastendorf | 2006 | merged to form Tandel |
| Fouhren | 2006 | merged to form Tandel |
| Heinerscheid | 2011 | merged into Clervaux |
| Munshausen | 2011 | merged into Clervaux |
| Heiderscheid | 2011 | merged into Esch-sur-Sûre |
| Neunhausen | 2011 | merged into Esch-sur-Sûre |
| Bascharage | 2011 | merged to form Käerjeng |
| Clemency | 2011 | merged to form Käerjeng |
| Consthum | 2011 | merged to form Parc Hosingen |
| Hoscheid | 2011 | merged to form Parc Hosingen |
| Hosingen | 2011 | merged to form Parc Hosingen |
| Burmerange | 2011 | merged into Schengen |
| Wellenstein | 2011 | merged into Schengen |
| Ermsdorf | 2011 | merged to form Vallée de l'Ernz |
| Medernach | 2011 | merged to form Vallée de l'Ernz |
| Eschweiler | 2015 | merged into Wiltz |
| Hobscheid | 2018 | merged to form Habscht |
| Septfontaines | 2018 | merged to form Habscht |
| Boevange-sur-Attert | 2018 | merged to form Helperknapp |
| Tuntange | 2018 | merged to form Helperknapp |
| Mompach | 2018 | merged to form Rosport-Mompach |
| Rosport | 2018 | merged to form Rosport-Mompach |
| Bous | 2023 | merged to form Bous-Waldbredimus |
| Waldbredimus | 2023 | merged to form Bous-Waldbredimus |
| Grosbous | 2023 | merged to form Groussbus-Wal |
| Wahl | 2023 | merged to form Groussbus-Wal |

== Evolution of communes ==
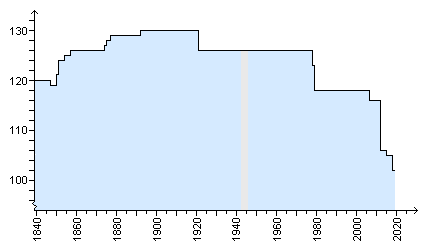
This chart shows the gradual expansion and contraction among the communes over time.

The municipal system was created during the French occupation to mirror the systems employed in the rest of the French Republic. These were overhauled in 1823, but the system itself was retained until independence, which was granted under the 1839 Treaty of London. The law regulating their creation and organisation dates to 24 February 1843, which was later enshrined in the Luxembourgish constitution promulgated on 17 October 1868.

Upon independence, there were 120 communes. A series of mergers and partitions between 1849 and 1891 increased this number to 130. Most of these were brought about by asymmetrical population growth, as population growth in the south caused the balance of population in the country to shift. For instance, some of the communes born in that era include Rumelange, Schifflange, and Walferdange. In the pattern of Nordstad, Erpeldange and Schieren were also separated from Ettelbruck.

Since the end of the First World War, during which Luxembourg was occupied by Germany, the number of communes has dropped steadily. In 1920, Luxembourg City was expanded, annexing four surrounding communes. Another wave of mergers took place in the 1970s when sparsely populated areas in the north and west of the country were merged to form Lac de la Haute-Sûre, Rambrouch, and Wincrange. 2006 saw the creation of Kiischpelt and Tandel from four smaller communes, further reducing them to just 116. 2012 saw the creation of Käerjeng, Vallée de l'Ernz and Parc Hosingen from smaller communes, and the merger of Clervaux, Esch-sur-Sûre and Schengen into adjacent ones. Eschweiler was merged into Wiltz in 2015. In 2018, the communes of Boevange-sur-Attert and Tuntange merged into the new commune of Helperknapp, Septfontaines and Hobscheid into the new commune of Habscht, and Rosport and Mompach into the new commune of Rosport-Mompach. Following the mergers of Bous and Waldbredimus into the new commune of Bous-Waldbredimus, and the merger of Grosbous and Wahl into Groussbus-Wal in 2023, there are now only 100 communes.

== See also ==
- Category:Lists of communes of Luxembourg
