= Tourism in Luxembourg =

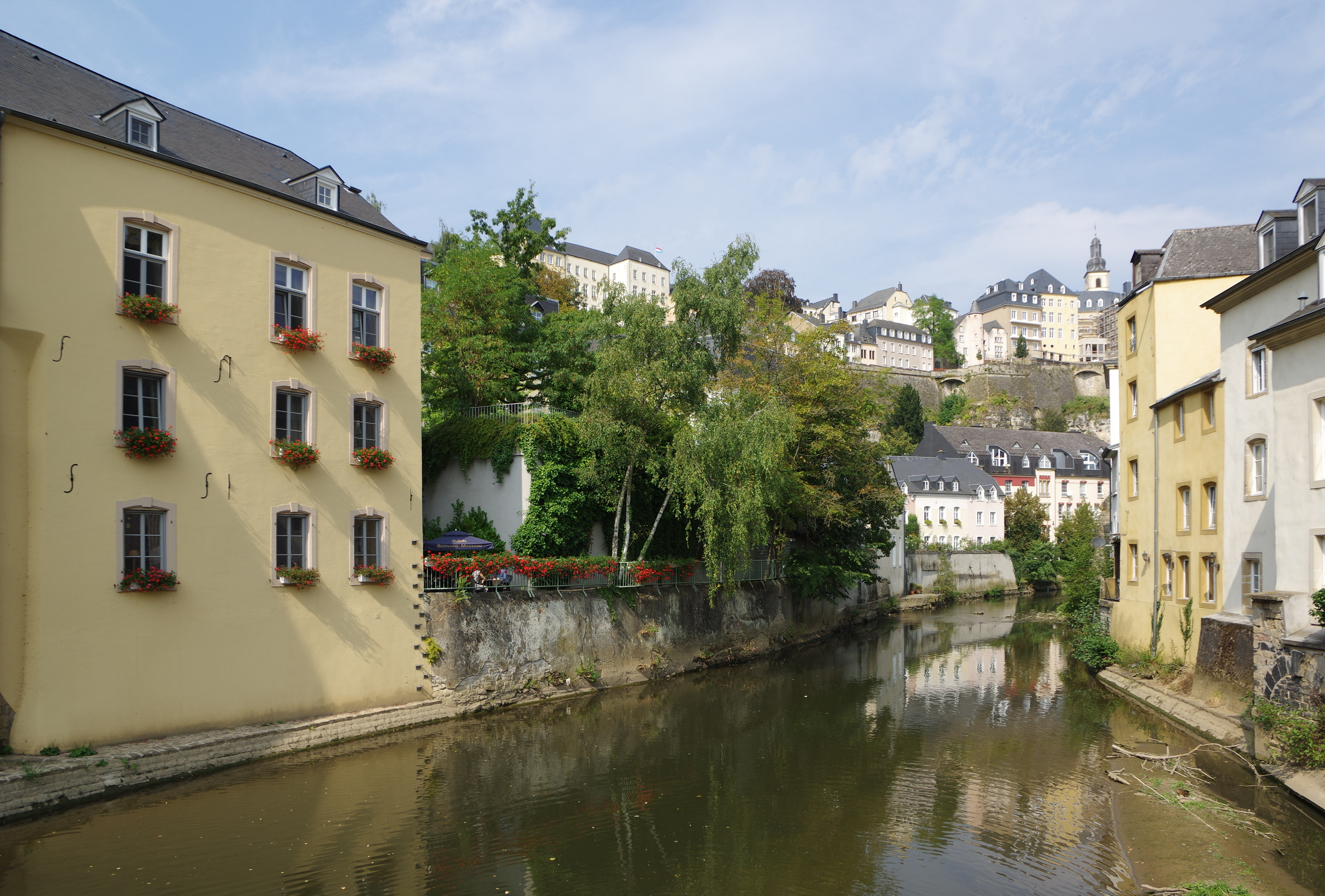
Luxembourg City

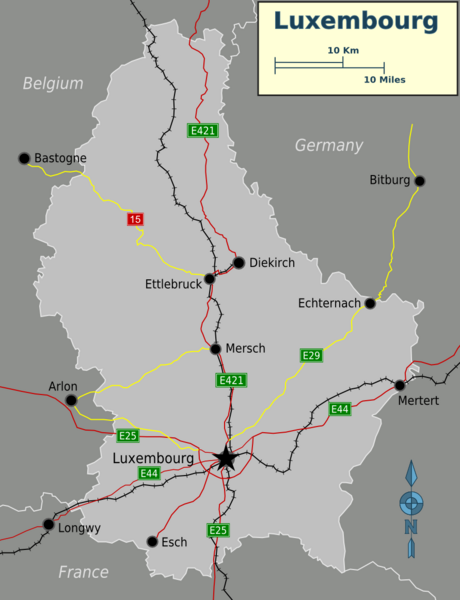
Luxembourg: main road and rail connections

Tourism is an important component of the national economy of Luxembourg, representing about 8.3% of GDP in 2009 and employing some 25,000 people or 11.7% of the working population. In 2010, despite the Great Recession, the Grand Duchy still welcomed over 900,000 visitors a year who spend an average of 2.5 nights in hotels, hostels or on camping sites. Business travel is flourishing representing 44% of overnight stays in the country and 60% in the capital, up 11% and 25% between 2009 and 2010. Published by the World Economic Forum in March 2011, the Travel and Tourism Competitiveness Report puts Luxembourg in 15th place worldwide, up from 23rd place in 2009.

Major destinations are historic Luxembourg City, the medieval castle of Vianden, Echternach with its abbey and the wine districts of the Moselle valley. The Mullerthal with its rocky cliffs in the east and the mountainous Éislek region in the Ardennes to the north are also favourites for outdoor enthusiasts.

Luxembourg has good road, rail and air connections with the rest of Europe, making it an increasingly popular destination for international meetings as well as for extended weekend stays. Over half the visitors to Luxembourg come from the Netherlands, Belgium and Germany with substantial numbers from France, the United Kingdom and the United States. Camping is popular in Luxembourg, particularly with the Dutch, who camp for much longer than other nationalities, especially in the Ardennes and the Mullerthal.

== The Grand Duchy ==
Bordered by Belgium, France, and Germany, Luxembourg has a population of over half a million people in an area of 2,586 square kilometres (998 sq mi). A representative democracy and constitutional monarchy ruled by a Grand Duke, it is the world's only remaining Grand Duchy. The country has a highly developed economy, with the world's highest GDP per capita. Its strategic importance dates back to a Roman era fortress and Frankish count's castle site in the Early Middle Ages. The City of Luxembourg, the capital and largest city, is the seat of several institutions and agencies of the European Union and an important financial centre.

Luxembourg culture is a mix of Romance Europe and Germanic Europe, borrowing customs from each of the distinct traditions. While Luxembourgers are fluent in all three of their official languages, German, French and Luxembourgish, most also have a good working knowledge of English.

=== Travel ===
Luxembourg's road network has been significantly modernised in recent years with motorways to Belgium, France and Germany. The advent of the high-speed TGV link to Paris has led to renovation of the city's railway station while the new passenger terminal at Luxembourg Airport handled over 1.6 million passengers in 2010, an increase of 5.1%.

There are frequent air connections with many European cities including Amsterdam, Berlin, Copenhagen, Frankfurt, Geneva, London, Madrid, Paris and Rome. Paris can also be reached in just over two hours by rail and in about three and a half hours by road. Brussels is some two hours away by road, a little longer by rail.

=== Accommodation ===
In 2009, Luxembourg had 261 hotels, inns and hostels able to accommodate 14,709 guests. The central area including the City of Luxembourg had a capacity of 8,057 guests (55%) followed by the Ardennes region with a capacity of 2,757 (18%). The total number of nights spent in hotels, inns and hostels was 1,264,448, down 8% on 2007. The number of nights spent camping was 739,208, down 8.4%.

=== National celebrations ===
Luxembourg has a number of celebrations of its own, some of which date back centuries. Among the most popular are:

- Buergbrennen: held on the Sunday after Shrove Tuesday, huge bonfires blaze throughout the country celebrating the end of winter.
- Emaischen: held every Easter Monday in the village of Nospelt and in Luxembourg's Fish Market, the centrepiece of the pottery fair is the Péckvillchen, a bird-shaped earthenware whistle.
- Octave: the main religious festival of the year, the octave is held in the second half of April for a period of two weeks when pilgrims come to the cathedral; a market on the Place Guillaume offers food, drink and religious artifacts.
- Dancing procession of Echternach: held on Whit Tuesday in memory of St Willibrord, hundreds of people "spring" from left to right as they dance through the town, linked by white handkerchiefs.
- National holiday: celebrated throughout the country on 23 June in honour of the grand duke, the festivities begin on the evening of the 22nd with a firework display in the centre of Luxembourg City.
- Schueberfouer: the extensive fun fair with all the traditional rides goes up in Limpertsberg on the Glacis around 23 August and remains for about three weeks.
- Wine festivals: usually held in October in the wine villages along the Moselle as a thanksgiving celebration for the grape harvest.
- St Nicolas: Kleeschen, the patron saint of children, with his servant in black, arrives in every village accompanied by a brass band ready, in agreement with their parents, to distribute presents to the children.

=== Food and drink ===
Luxembourg cuisine combines the quality of French dishes with the quantity of German and Belgian servings. But there are also some national favourites such as Bouneschlupp, a soup with French beans, Judd mat Gaardebounen, neck of pork with broad beans, and Fritür, small fried fish from the Moselle. Dry white wines from the Moselle valley include Riesling, Pinot gris, Pinot blanc and Auxerrois and the less sophisticated Rivaner and Elbling. Also popular is Luxembourg's Crémant, a sparkling wine produced in accordance with the traditional method for French champagne.

== Statistics ==
Tourist arrivals of 2024 in %

=== Arrivals by country ===
Total number of foreign tourists in Luxembourg in 2016 was 1,053,653. Most visitors arriving to Luxembourg and staying in accommodation in 2016 were from the following countries:

Rank	Country	Number
1	Belgium	209,832
2	Netherlands	177,981
3	Germany	151,691
4	France	139,375
5	United Kingdom	69,350
6	China	35,697
7	Italy	28,852
8	Switzerland	23,435
9	Spain	19,075
10	Turkey	16,237

== Regions ==
=== Luxembourg City ===
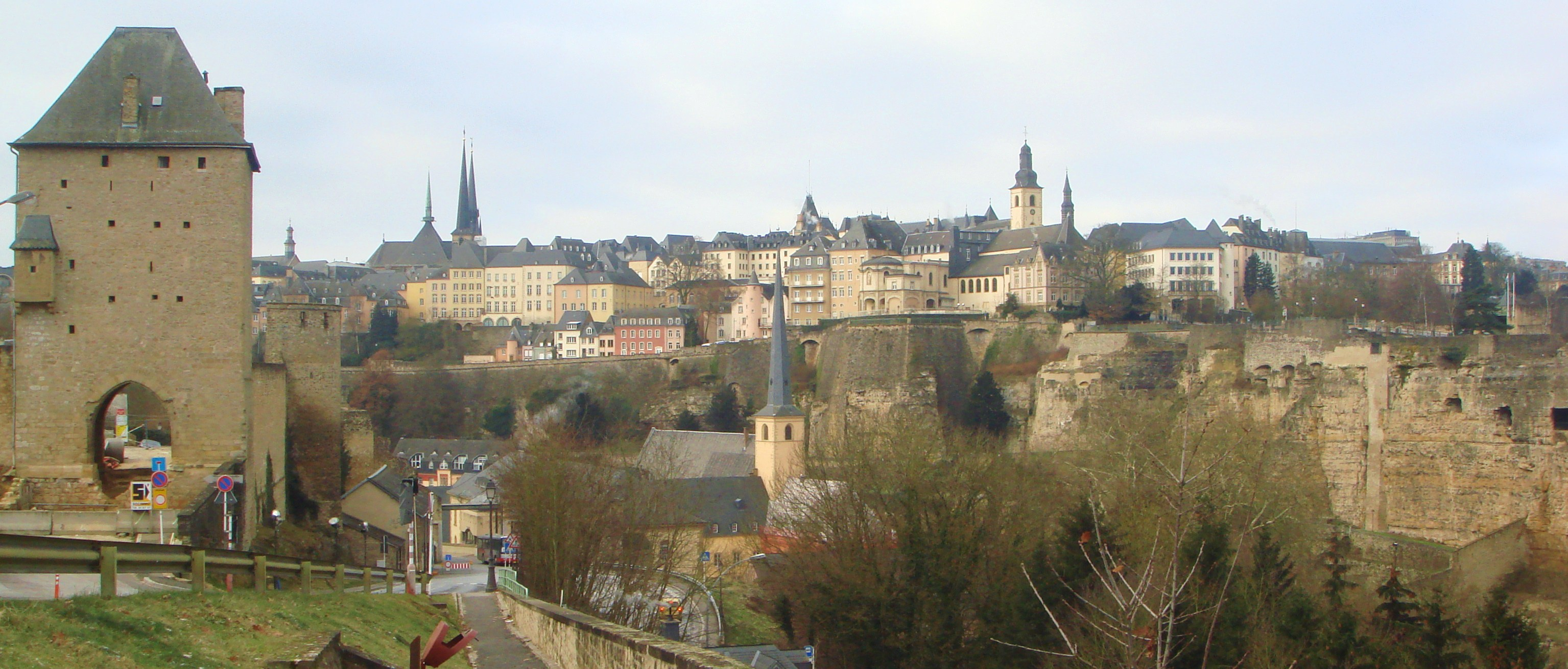
The old town

The City of Luxembourg is not only a historic UNESCO site with its fortifications lining the steep valley but also an important European and financial centre with imposing modern buildings.

In September 2011, the Luxembourg City Tourist Office reported that after several years of decline, the city welcomed 403,085 tourists between January and August 2011, a 6.38 increase over 2010. The casemates were the most popular attraction with a total of 87,083 visitors, most of whom visited the Bock Casemates.

==== The old town ====
Within walking distance of each other, places of interest in the old town include the fortifications and the underground defences known as the casemates, the Grand Ducal Palace, the neogothic Cathedral of Notre Dame, Place Guillaume II with the City Hall, the Place d'Armes with its pavement restaurants and cafés, the Gëlle Fra or Golden Lady crowning the obelisk in memory of those who died for their country during the First World War and the nearby Adolphe Bridge towering over the valley.

There are also two particularly interesting museums in the old town. The Luxembourg City History Museum traces the history of the city from its foundations (in the lower floors) to the present (at the top) while the National Museum of History and Art showcases Celtic and Roman findings including the well-preserved Vichten Mosaic depicting the Roman muses.

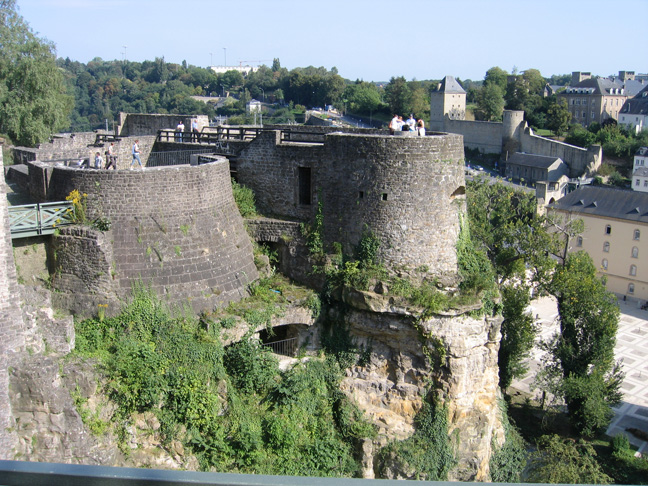
The Bock fortifications

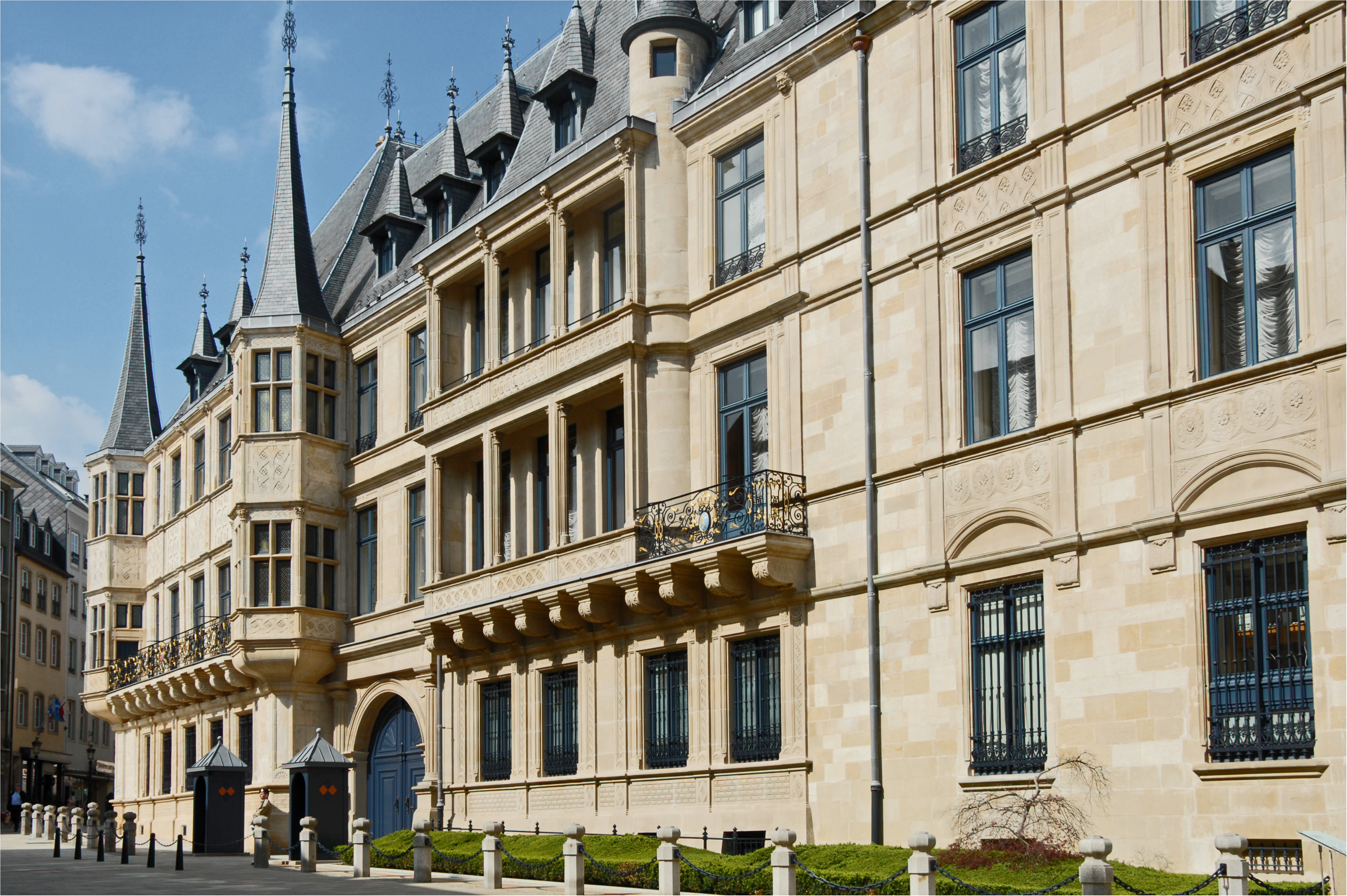
The Grand Ducal palace

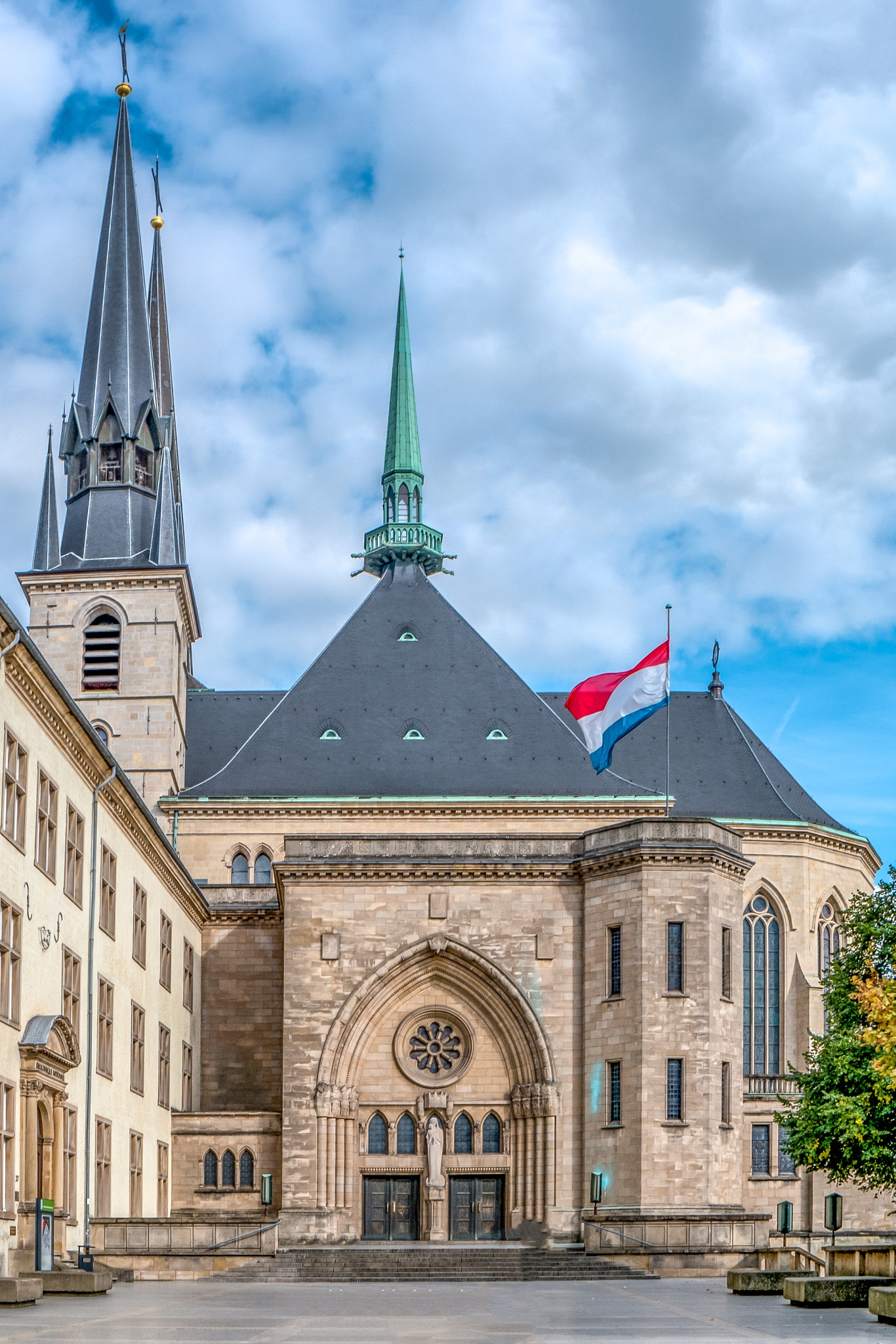
Notre Dame cathedral

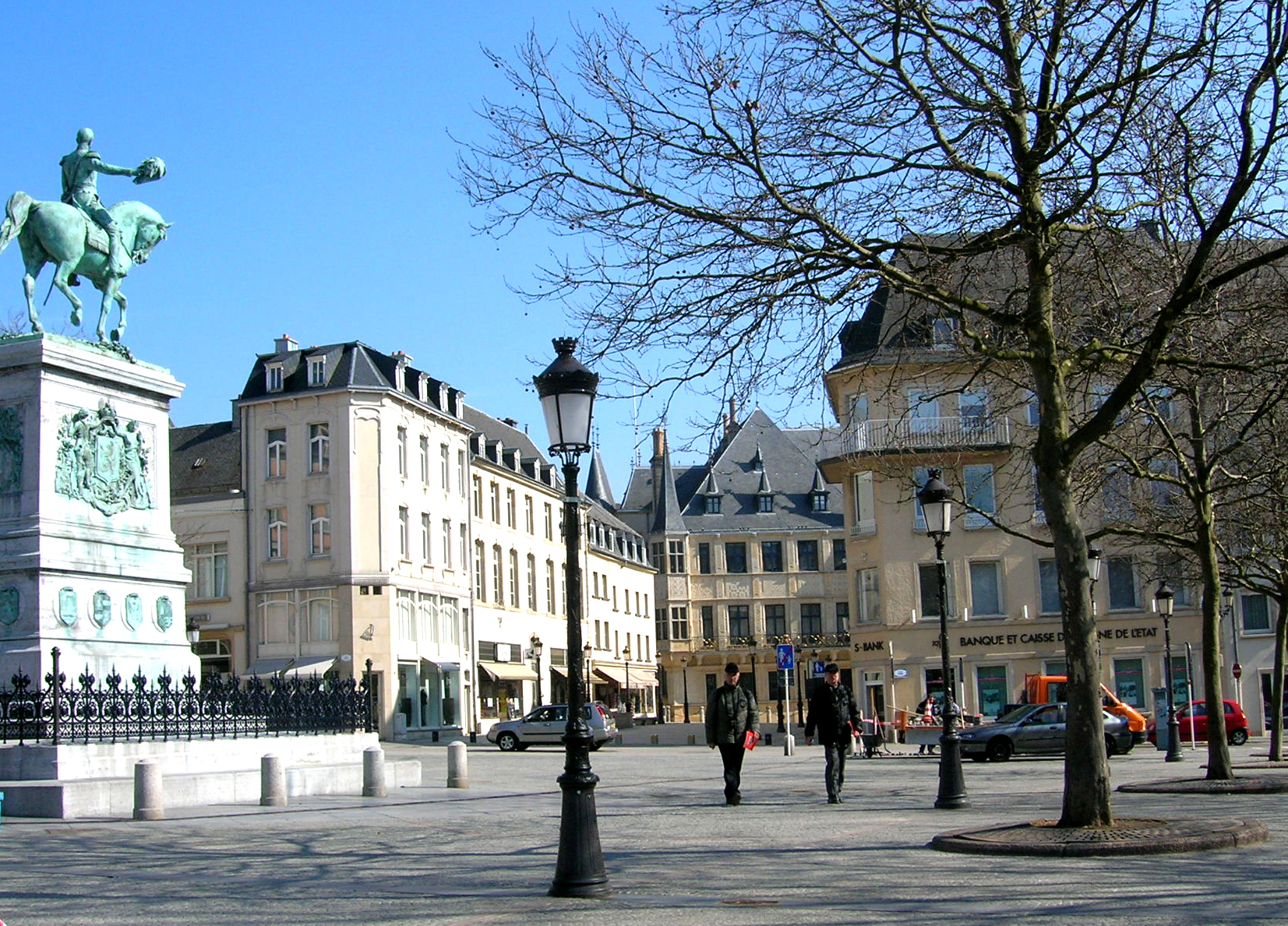
Place Guillaume II
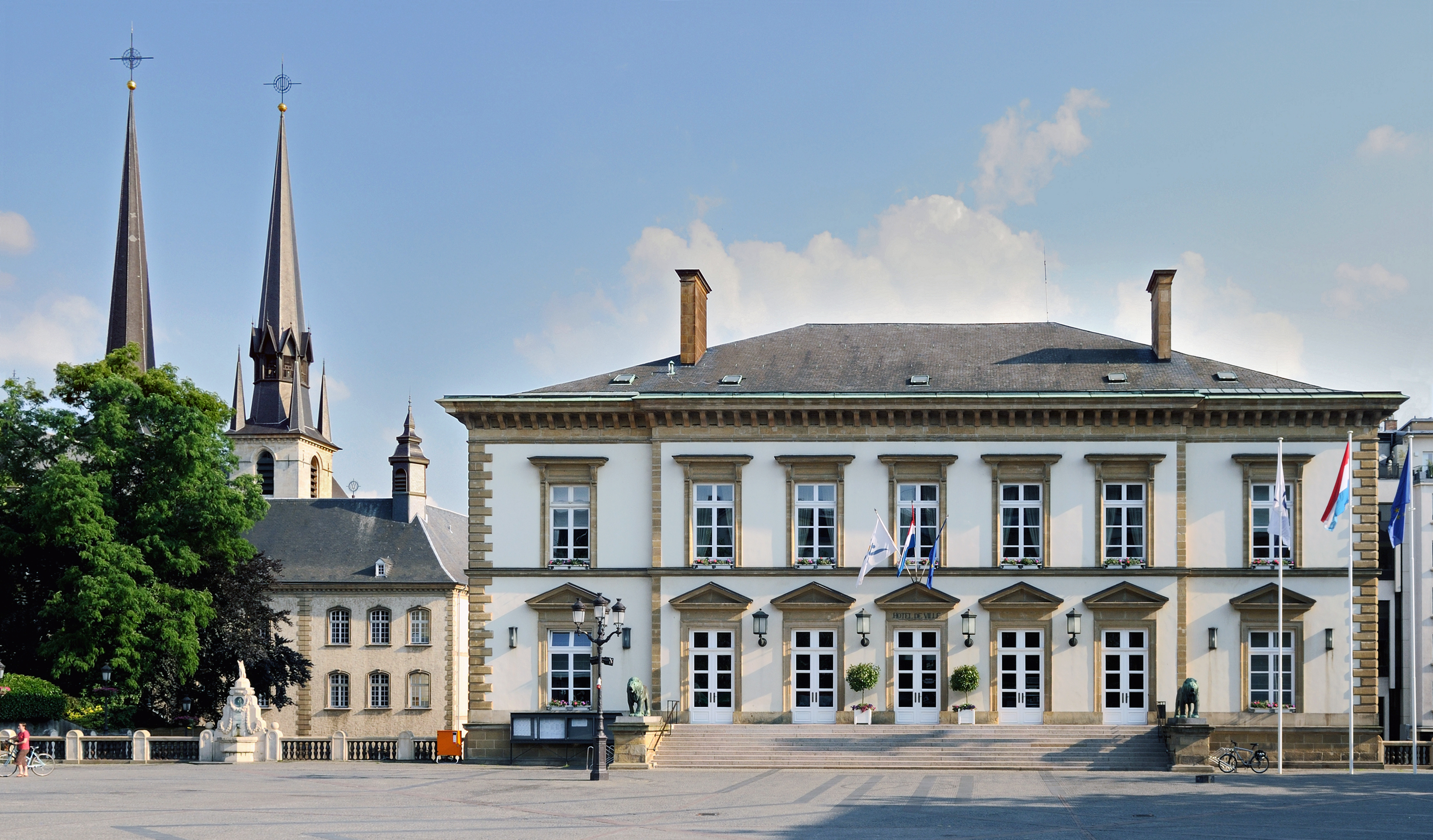
City Hall

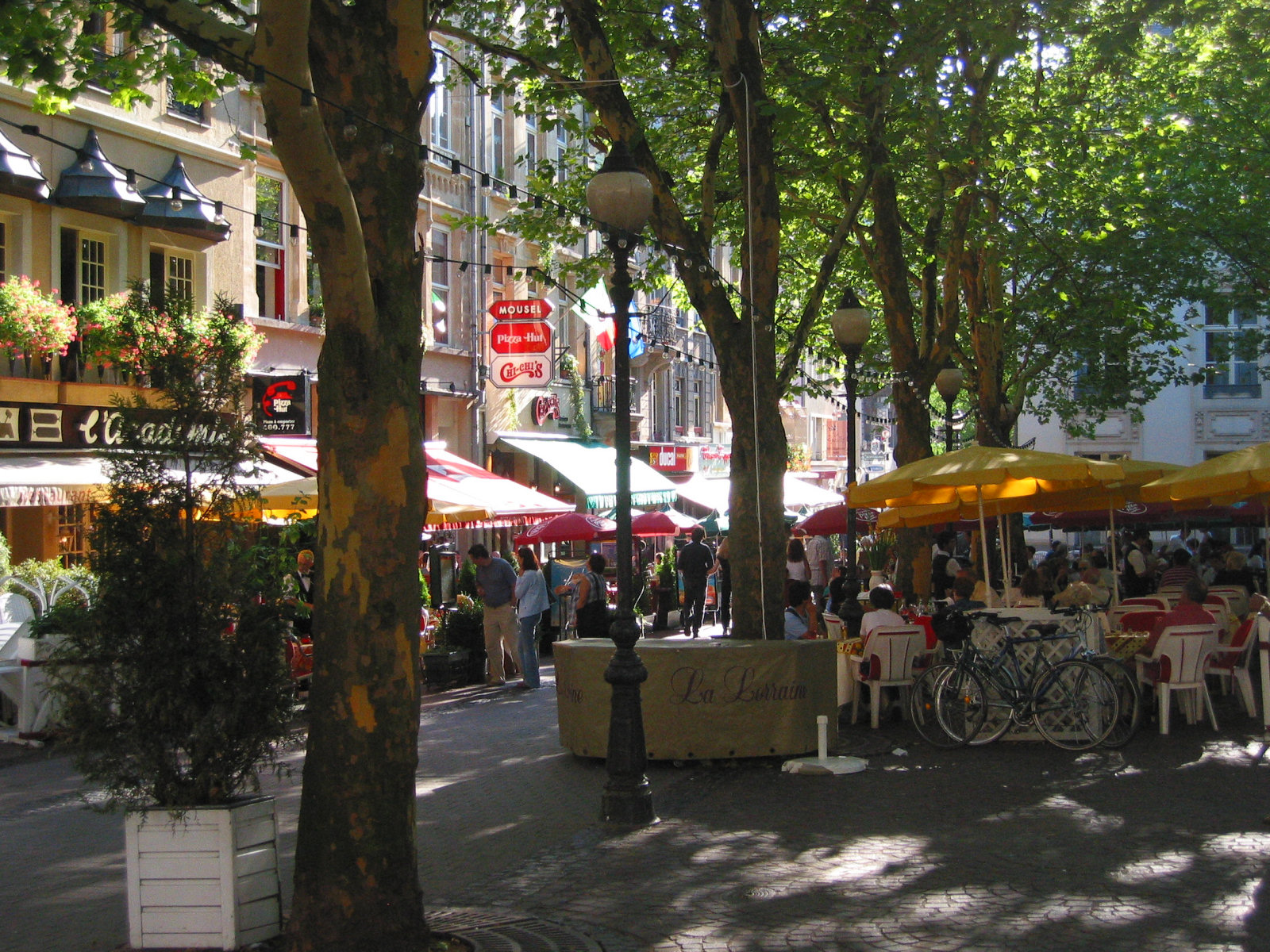
Place d'Armes

Gëlle Fra memorial

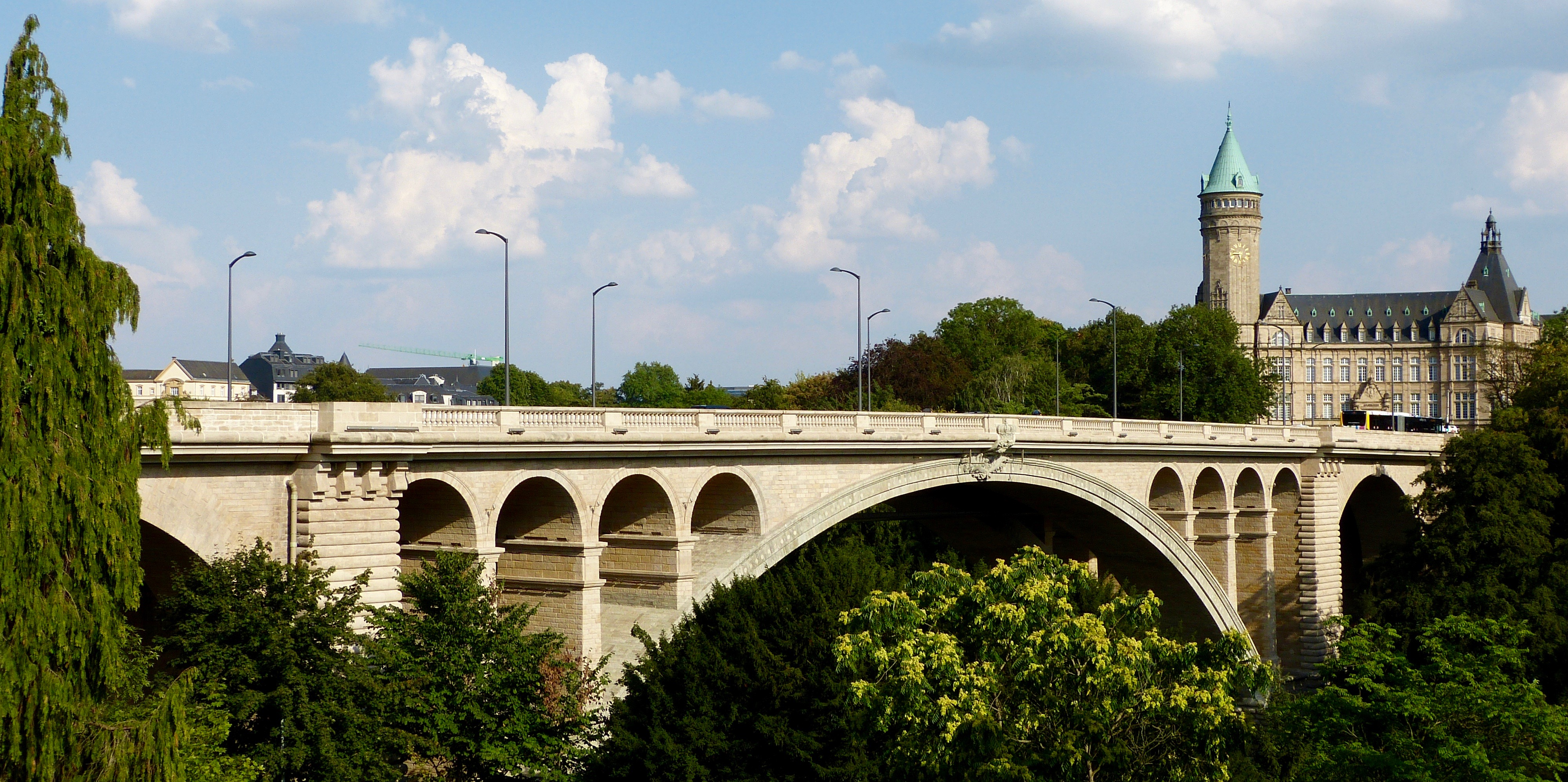
Adolphe Bridge

==== The Grund ====
The valley itself, known as the Grund, also has points of interest such as the Neimënster Abbey and the Natural History Museum. Once a poor quarter of the city, it has become increasingly popular for its night life in the narrow medieval streets and for its gastronomic restaurants.

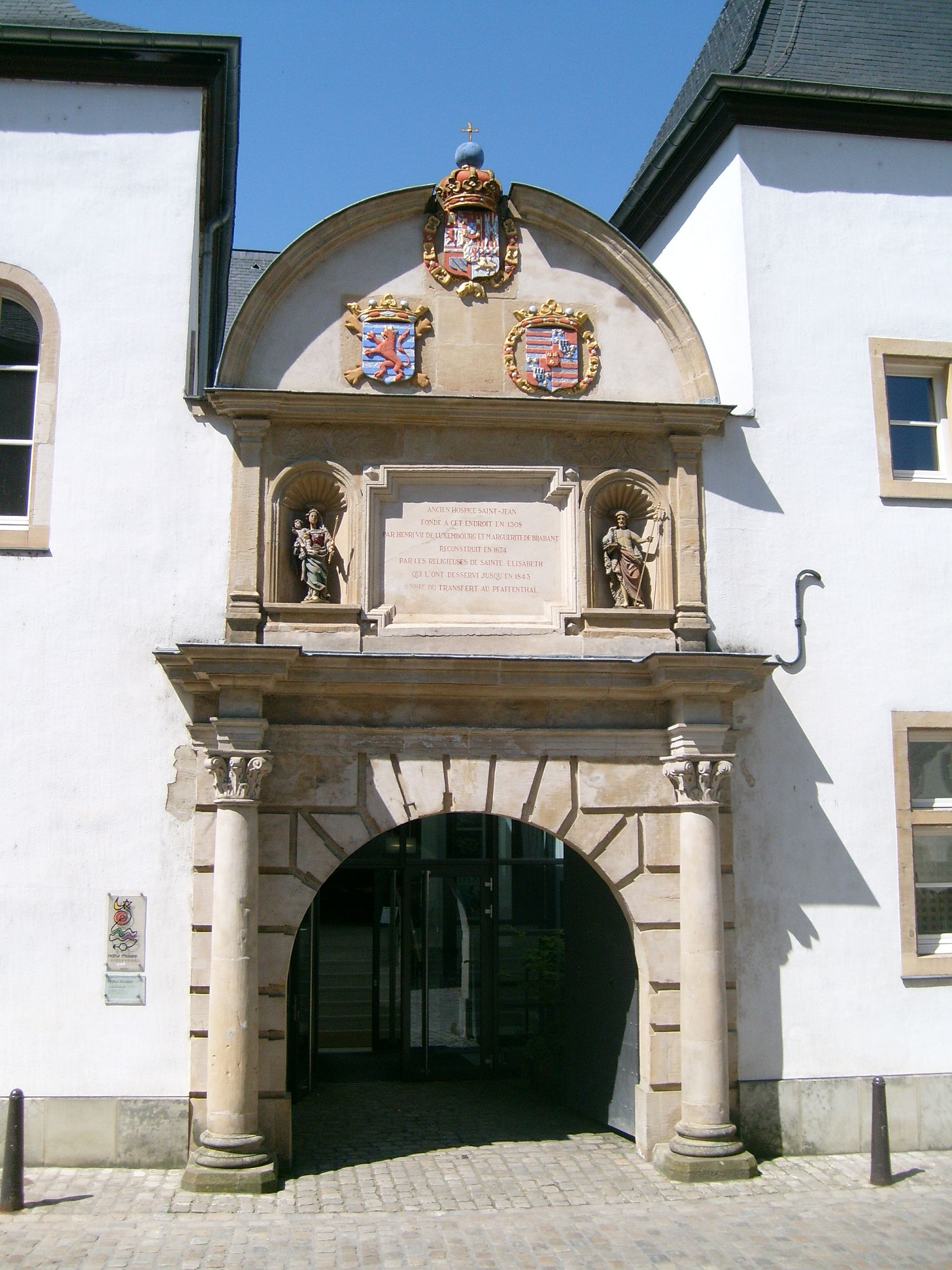
Natural History Museum

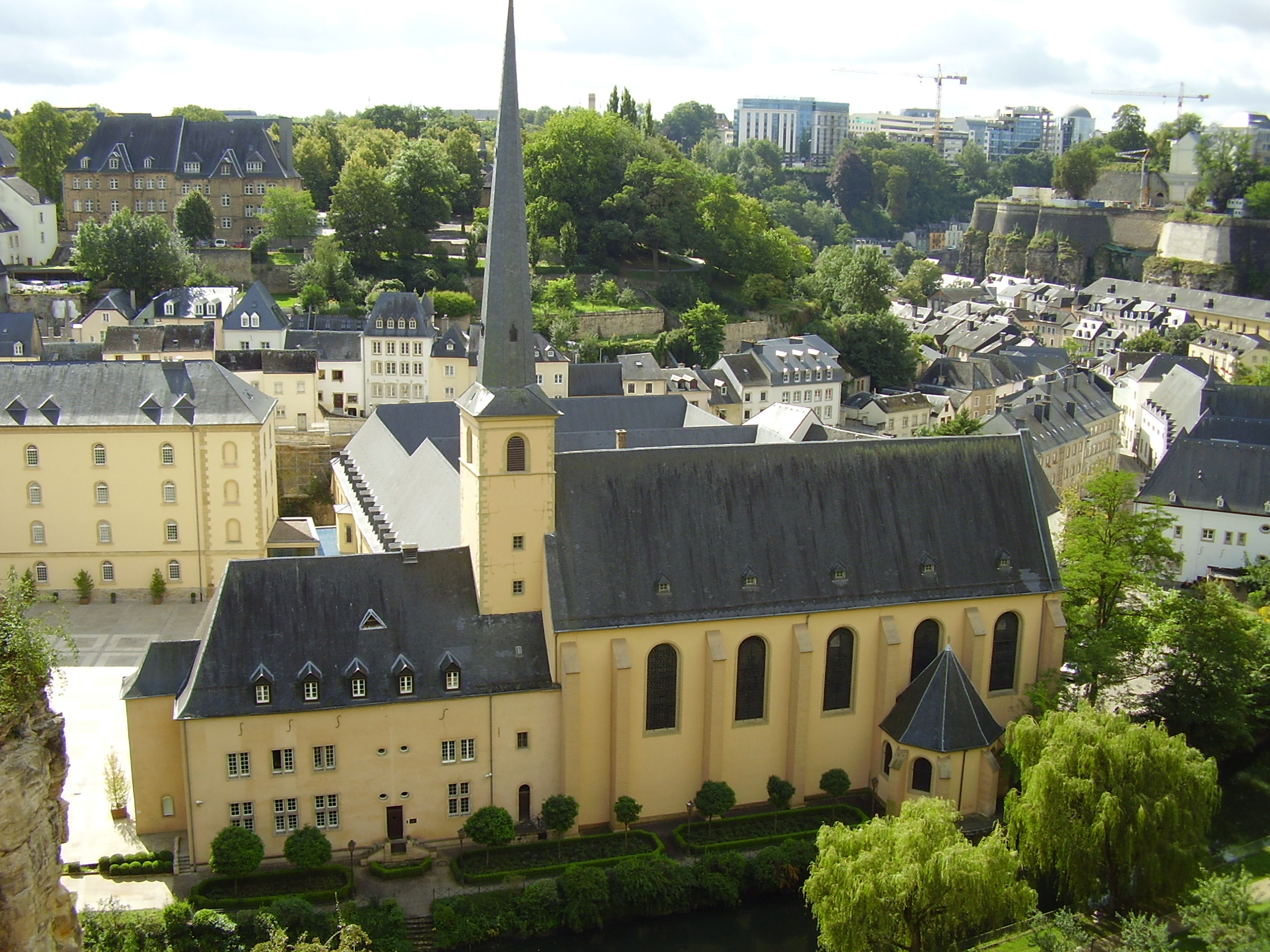
Neimënster Abbey

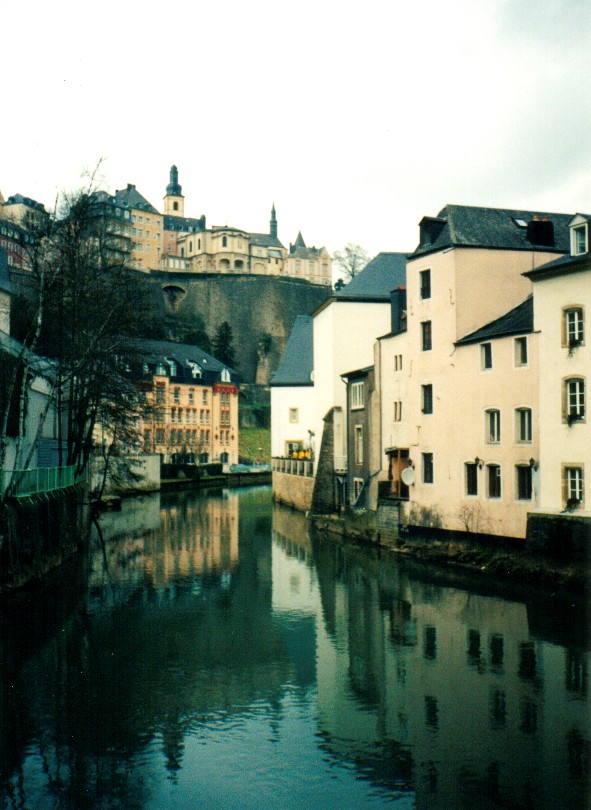
Alzette River in the Grund

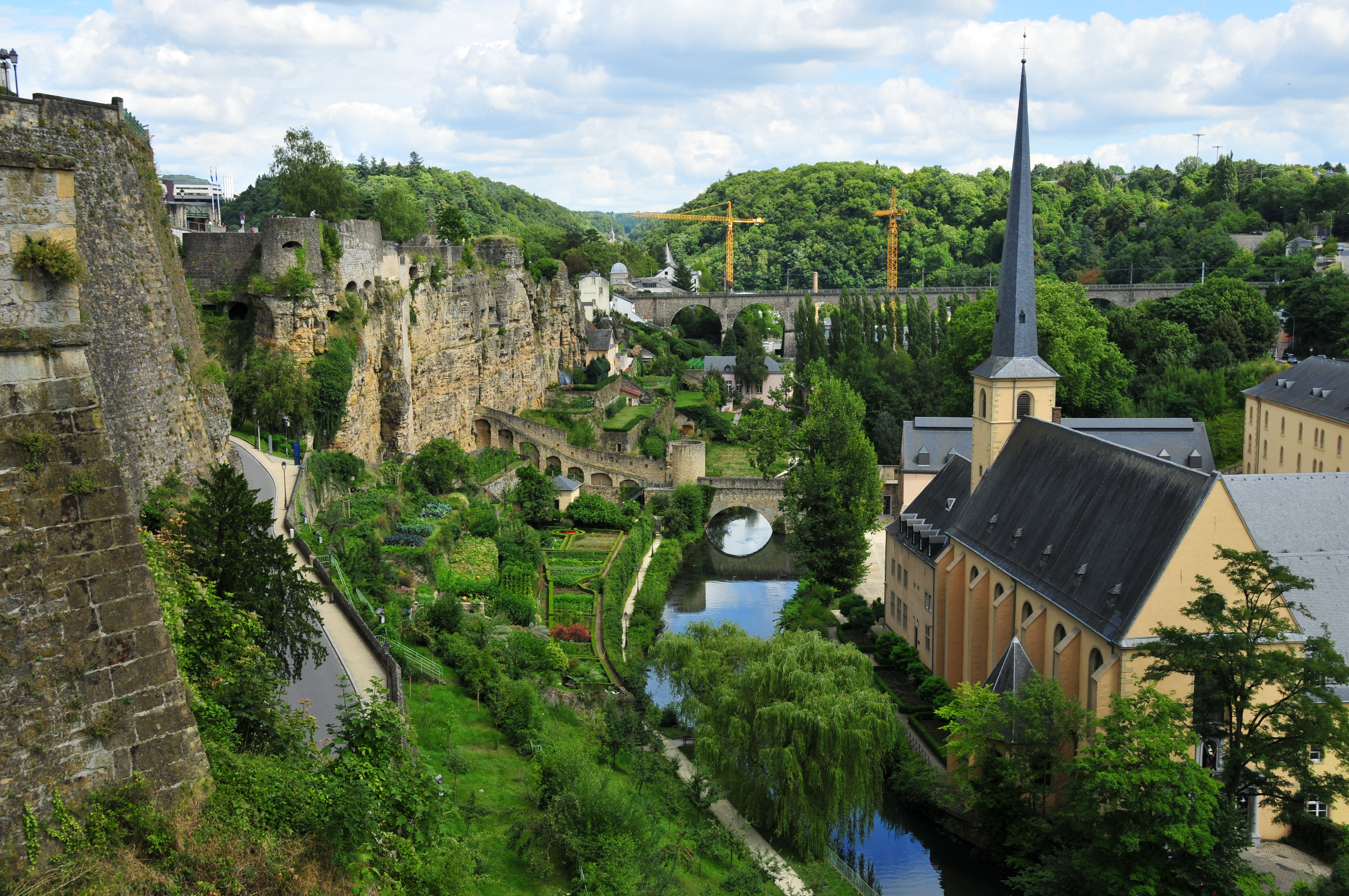
The Grund from the Corniche

==== Kirchberg ====
The Kirchberg Plateau which covers the area between the city and the airport began to develop in the 1970s with office buildings for the European Institutions. Over the years, it has become the focus of Luxembourg's financial interests with an impressive array of banks and business centres. There have also been cultural developments such as the impressive Museum of Modern Art and the Philharmonie concert hall as well as sports and entertainment facilities.

Place de l'Europe, Kirchberg

Kirchberg's modern look

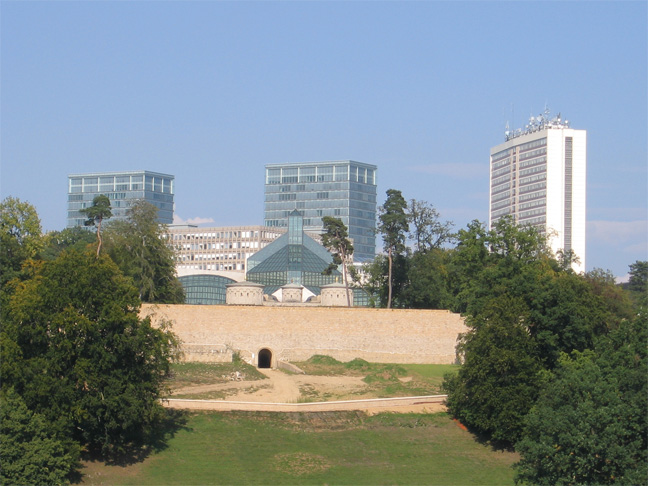
Kirchberg with the Modern Art Museum

=== Vianden ===
Located close to the German border in northeastern Luxembourg, Vianden is a small hilly town in a picturesque setting on the River Our. Visitors are attracted above all by the carefully restored medieval castle standing high above the river but also by the old-world atmosphere which pervades the town.

Vianden Castle was built between the 11th and 14th centuries and became the seat of the counts of Vianden. It was further developed until the 18th century but with the departure of the Counts of Luxembourg to the Netherlands combined with the effects of fire and an earthquake, it slowly deteriorated. The final blow came in 1820 when William I of the Netherlands sold it to a local merchant who in turn sold off its contents and masonry piecemeal, reducing it to a ruin. Not until 1977, when Grand Duke Jean ceded the castle to the State, was it possible to undertake large-scale restoration work.

Vianden also has a chair lift up to a restaurant high above the castle, offering extensive views of the town and its mountainous surroundings. The Victor Hugo museum near the bridge over the River Our presents a number of the author's original letters and drawings in the house where he used to stay.

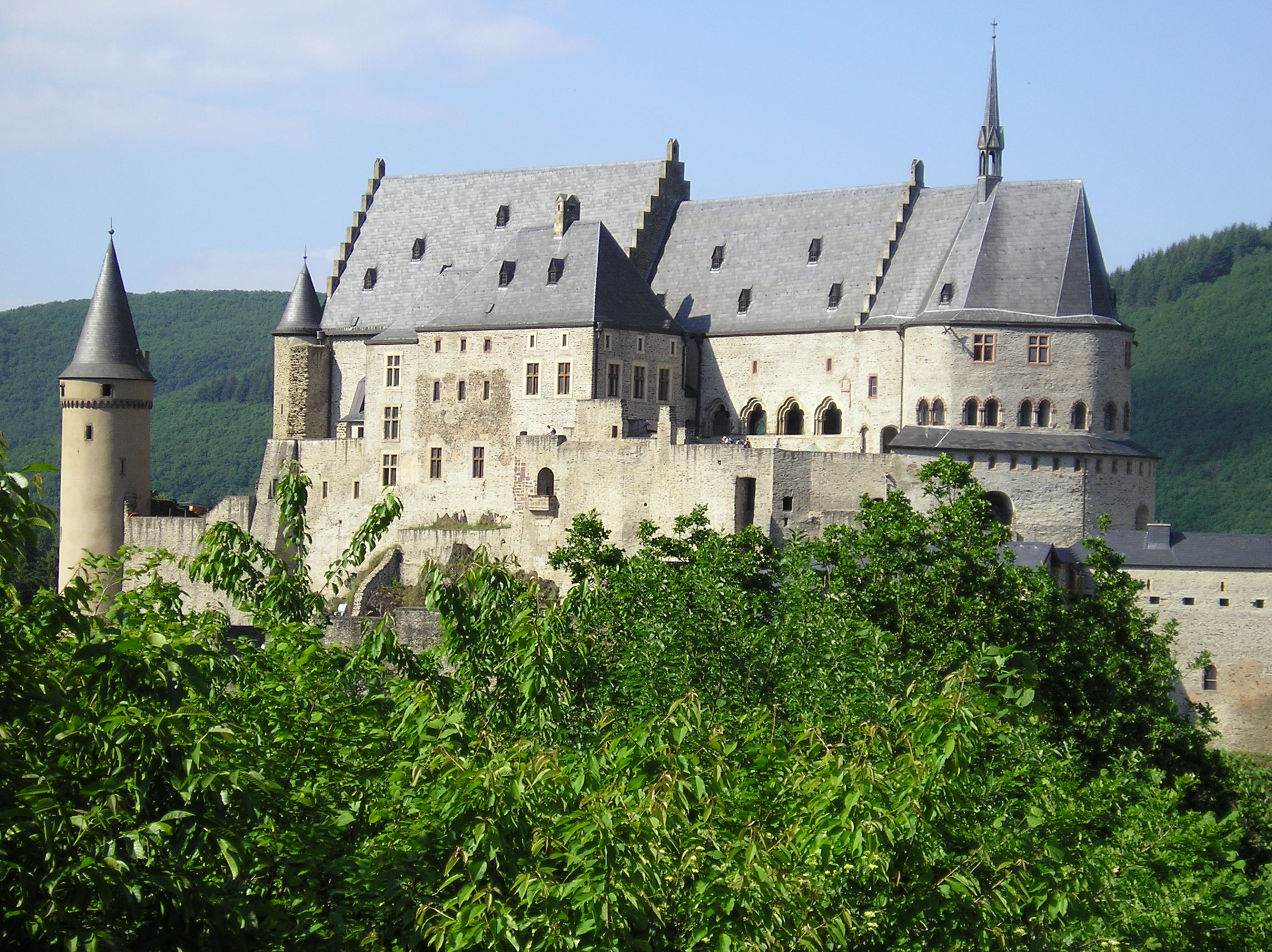
Castle of Vianden

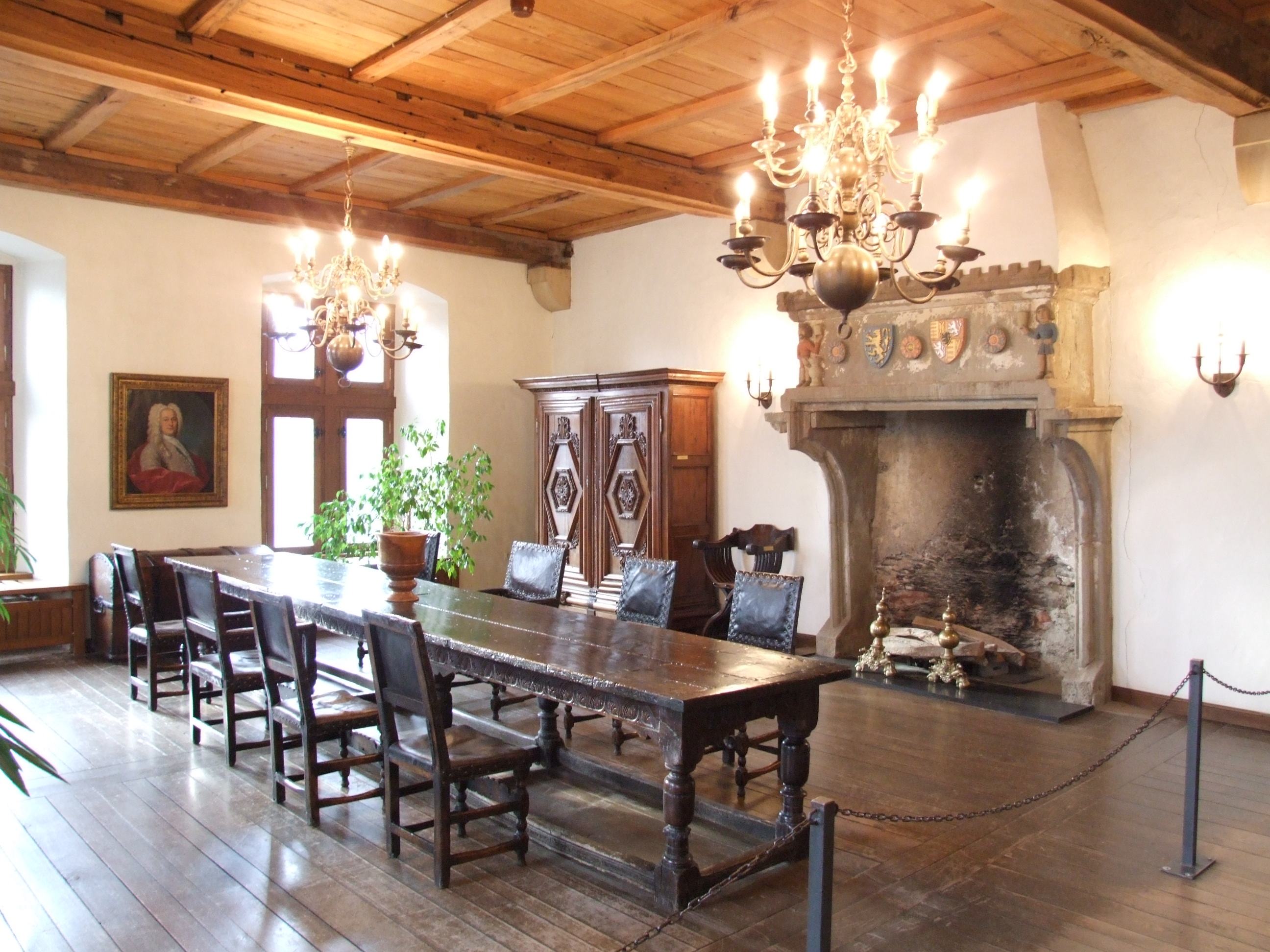
Inside the castle

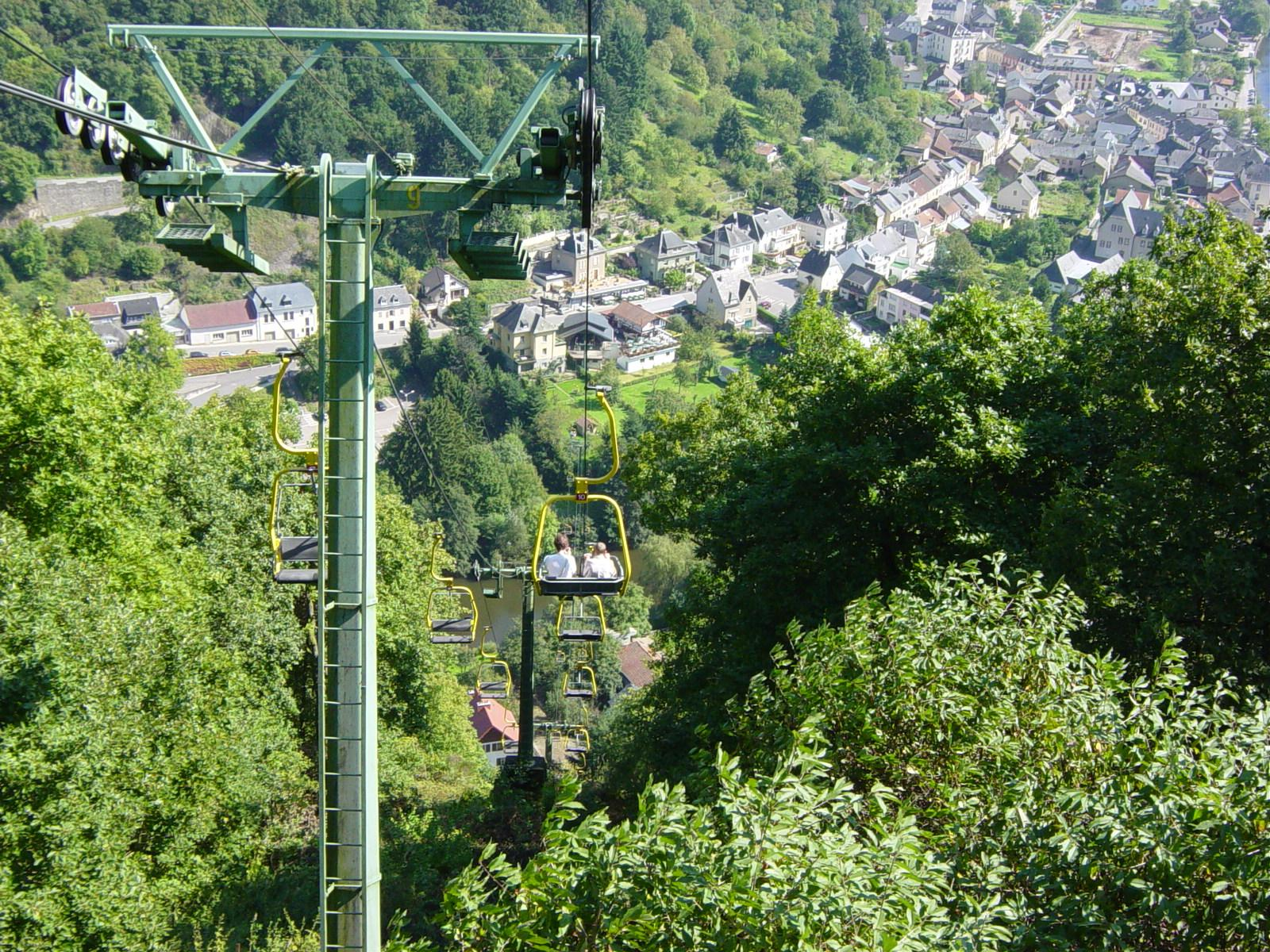
The town from the chairlift

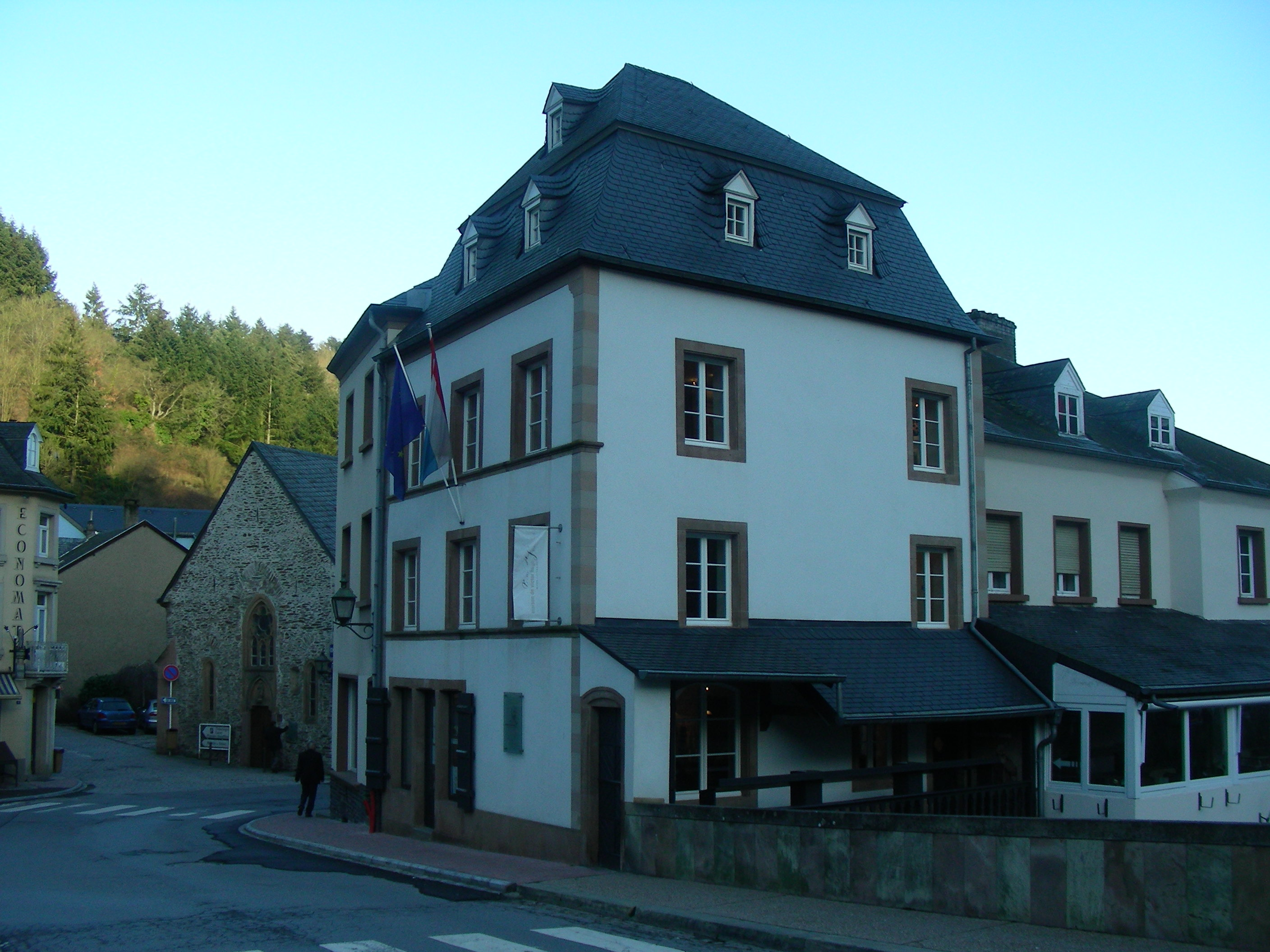
Victor Hugo museum

=== Echternach ===
With a population of some 4,000, Echternach near the German border is the oldest town in Luxembourg. It was founded in 698 by St. Willibrord, an English monk who was the abbot of the monastery until his death in 739. In his honour, for the past 500 years the dancing procession has taken place every Whit Tuesday, attracting pilgrims from near and far. The Romanesque basilica with symmetrical towers still houses his tomb in its crypt. The town of Echternach grew up around the abbey walls and was granted a city charter in 1236. The abbey was rebuilt in a handsome Baroque range in 1737. Echternach is also the site of a large Roman villa which was discovered in 1975 and is open to visitors.

The town, still surrounded by its medieval walls, hosts the International Music Festival in May and June each year. It is an ideal starting point for walks into the Mullertal or for cycle trips along the River Sure. Echternach also has an interesting Prehistory Museum.

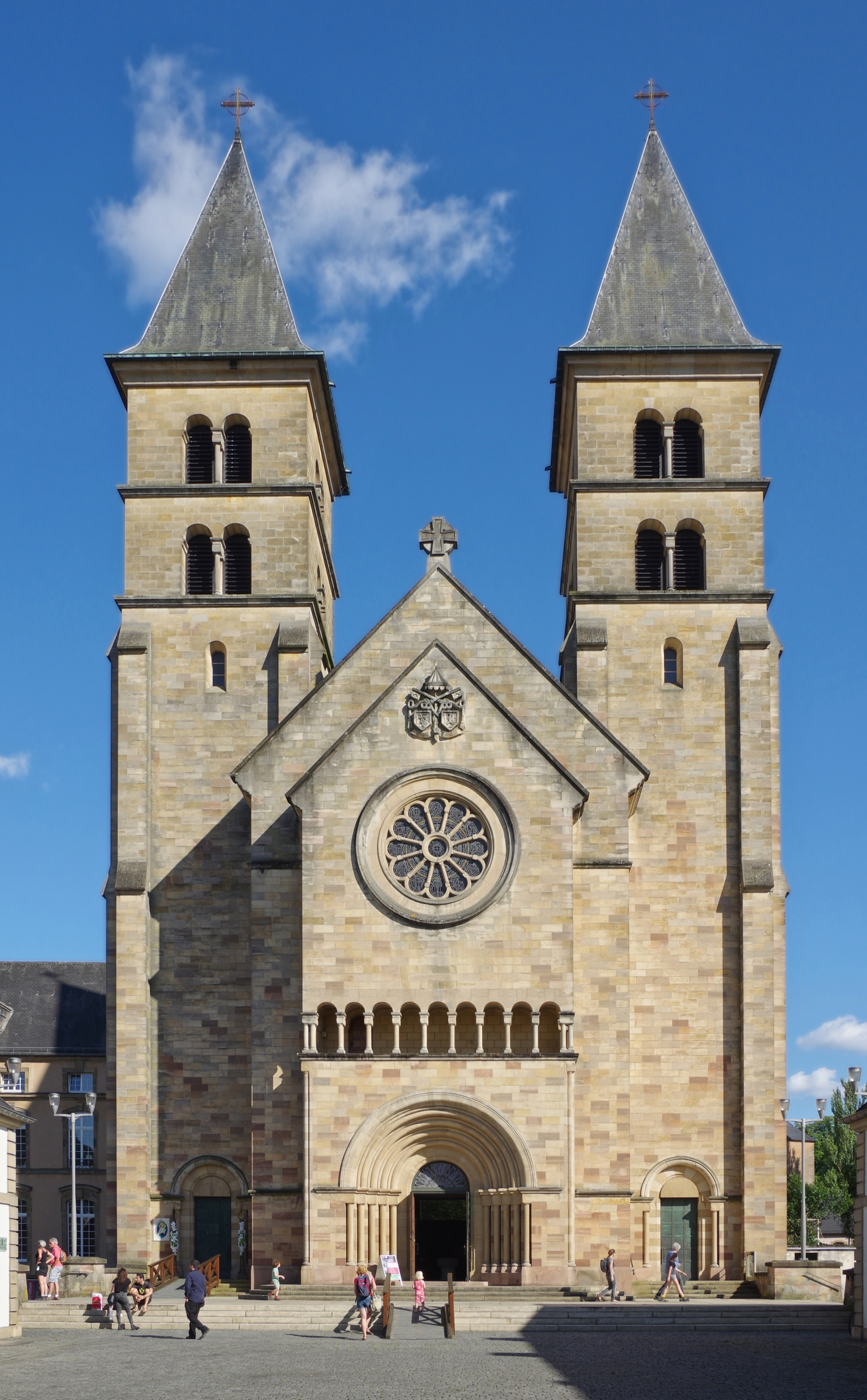
The Basilica

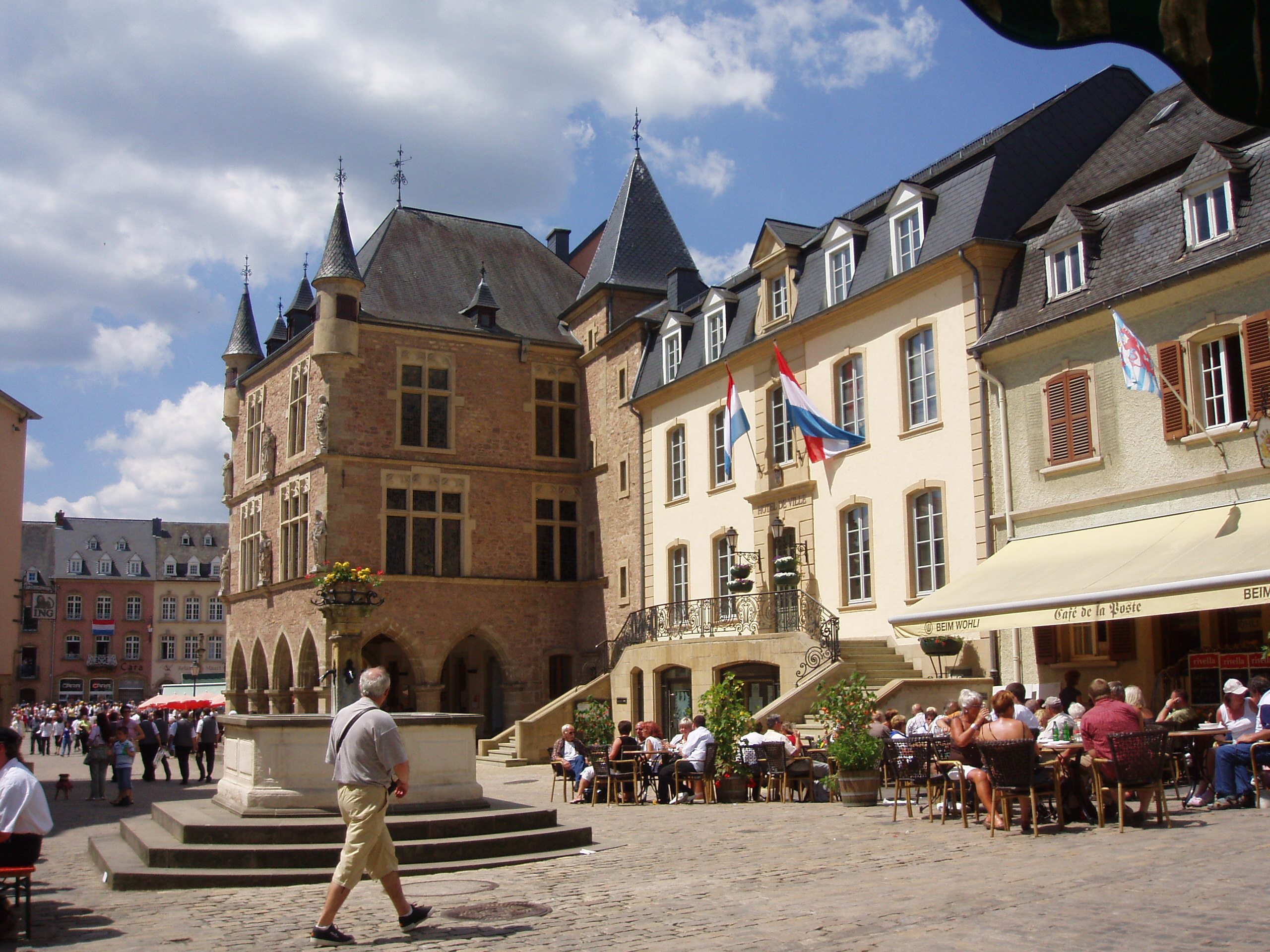
The town centre

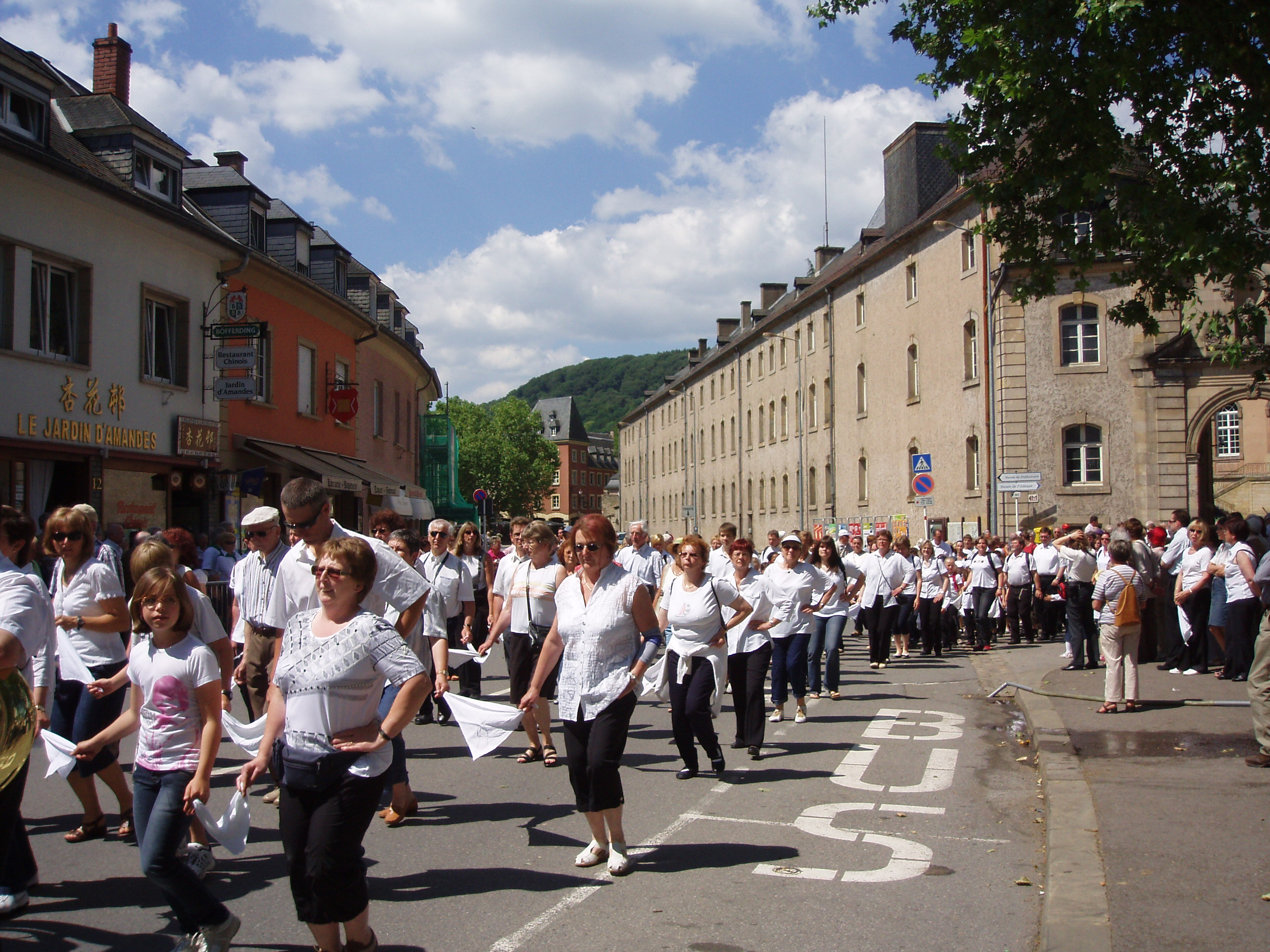
The spring procession

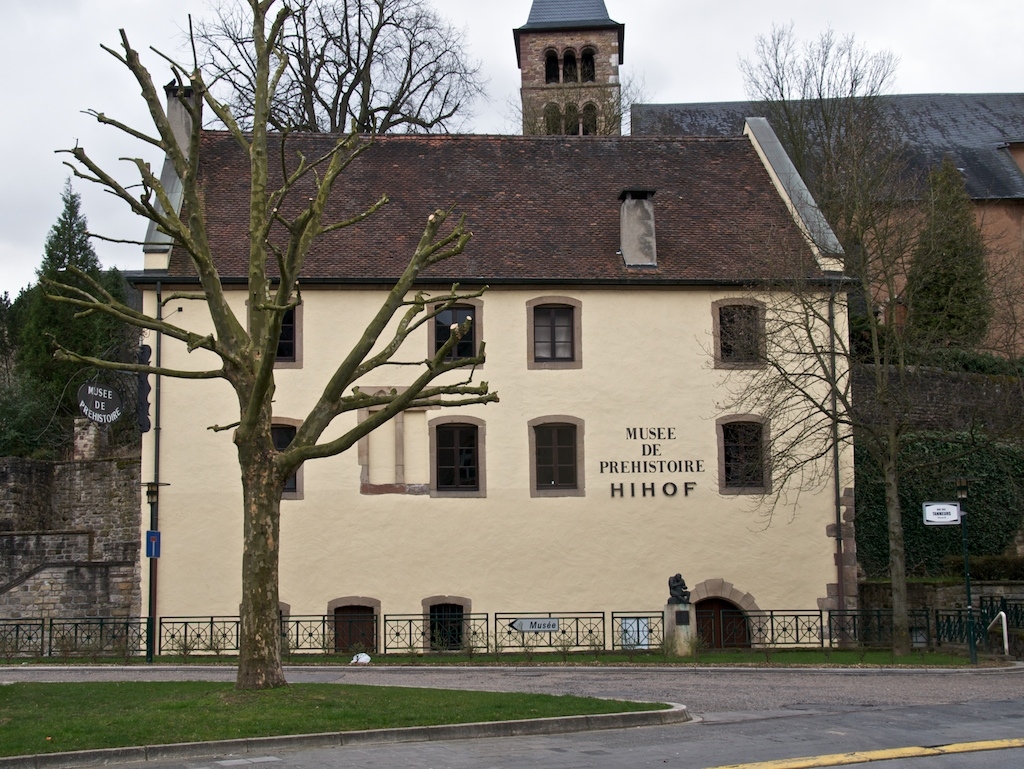
The Prehistory Museum

=== The Moselle valley ===
Stretching 42 km (26 mi) from Schengen in the south to Wasserbillig in the north, the rounded hills of the Moselle valley are lined by vineyards. The river passes a number of quaint little riverside towns and villages with narrow streets, wine cooperatives and annual wine festivals. From south to north, the river flows past Schengen, famous for the EU agreement facilitating cross-border travel, Remerschen, Schwebsange, Bech-Kleinmacher, Wellenstein and Remich which has been attracting wine-enthusiasts since Roman times and is still a busy venue for tourists with promenades, gardens, river excursions and wine cellars. After Stadtbredimus on the river front and Greiveldange up in the hills, the Moselle then passes the charming villages of Ehnen with its Wine Museum, Wormeldange, Ahn and Machtum where some of Luxembourg's finest restaurants are to be found. Then comes the small town of Grevenmacher before the Moselle meets the Sauer at the busy border town of Wasserbillig.

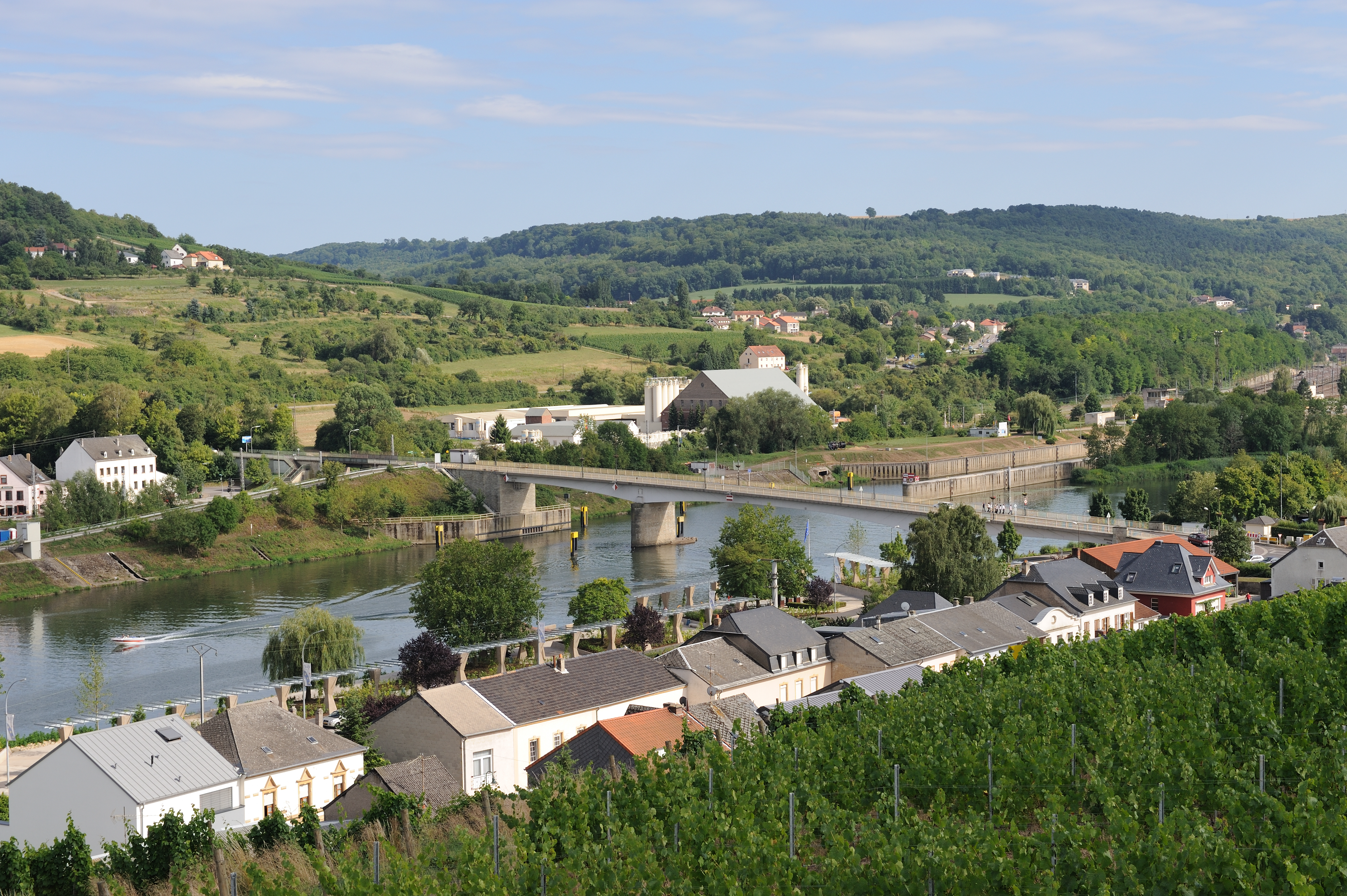
Schengen

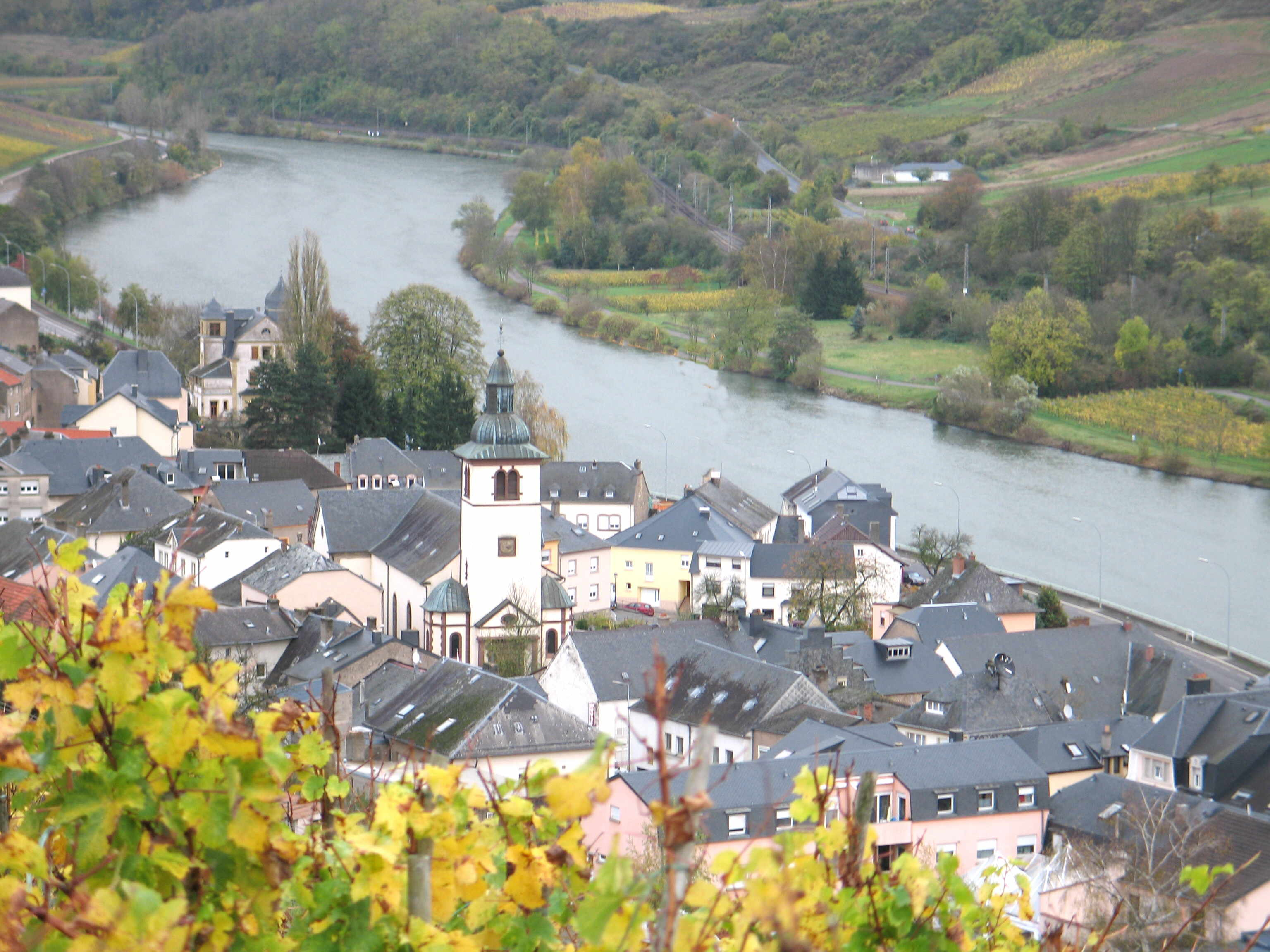
Wormeldange

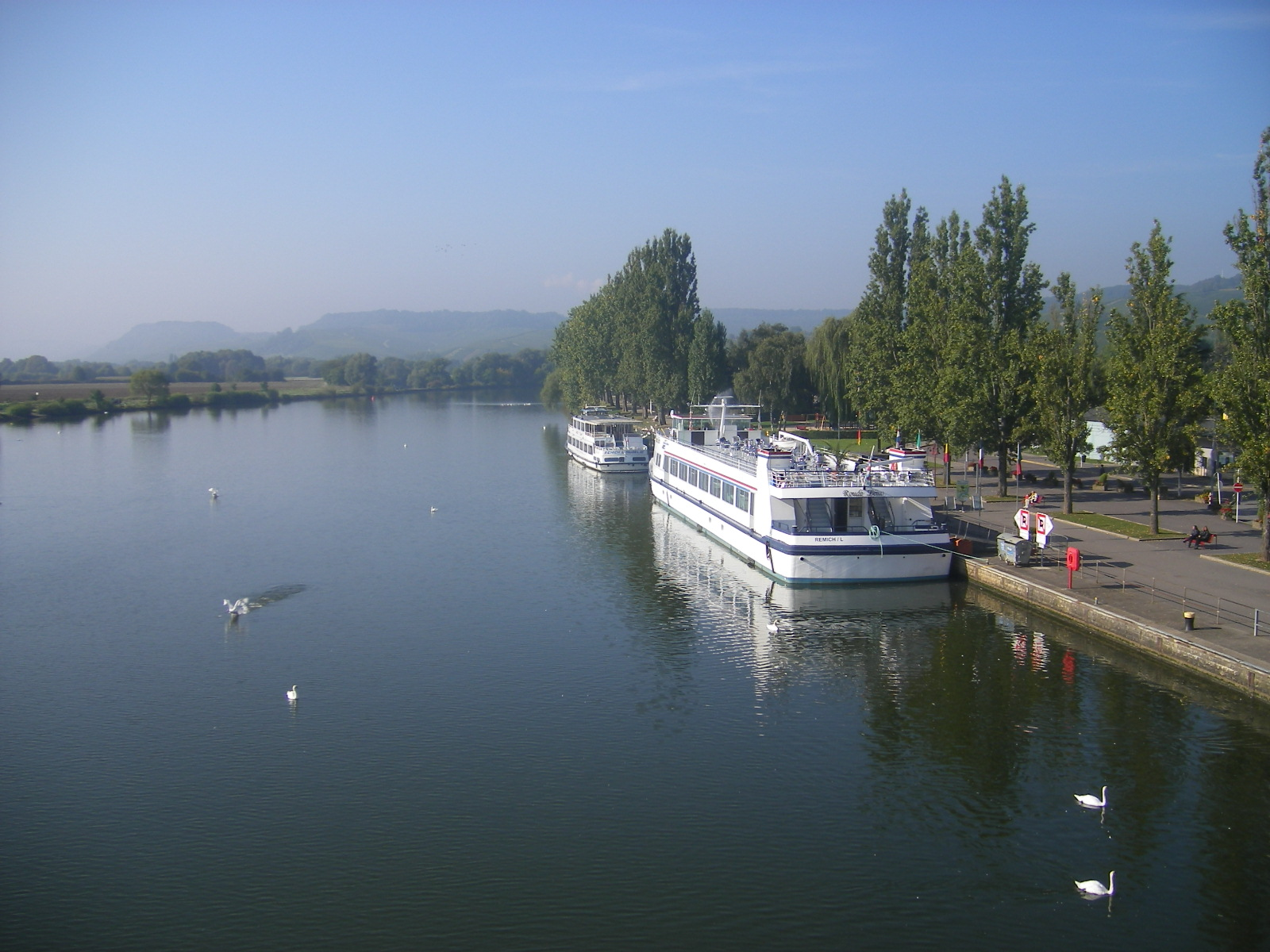
Remich

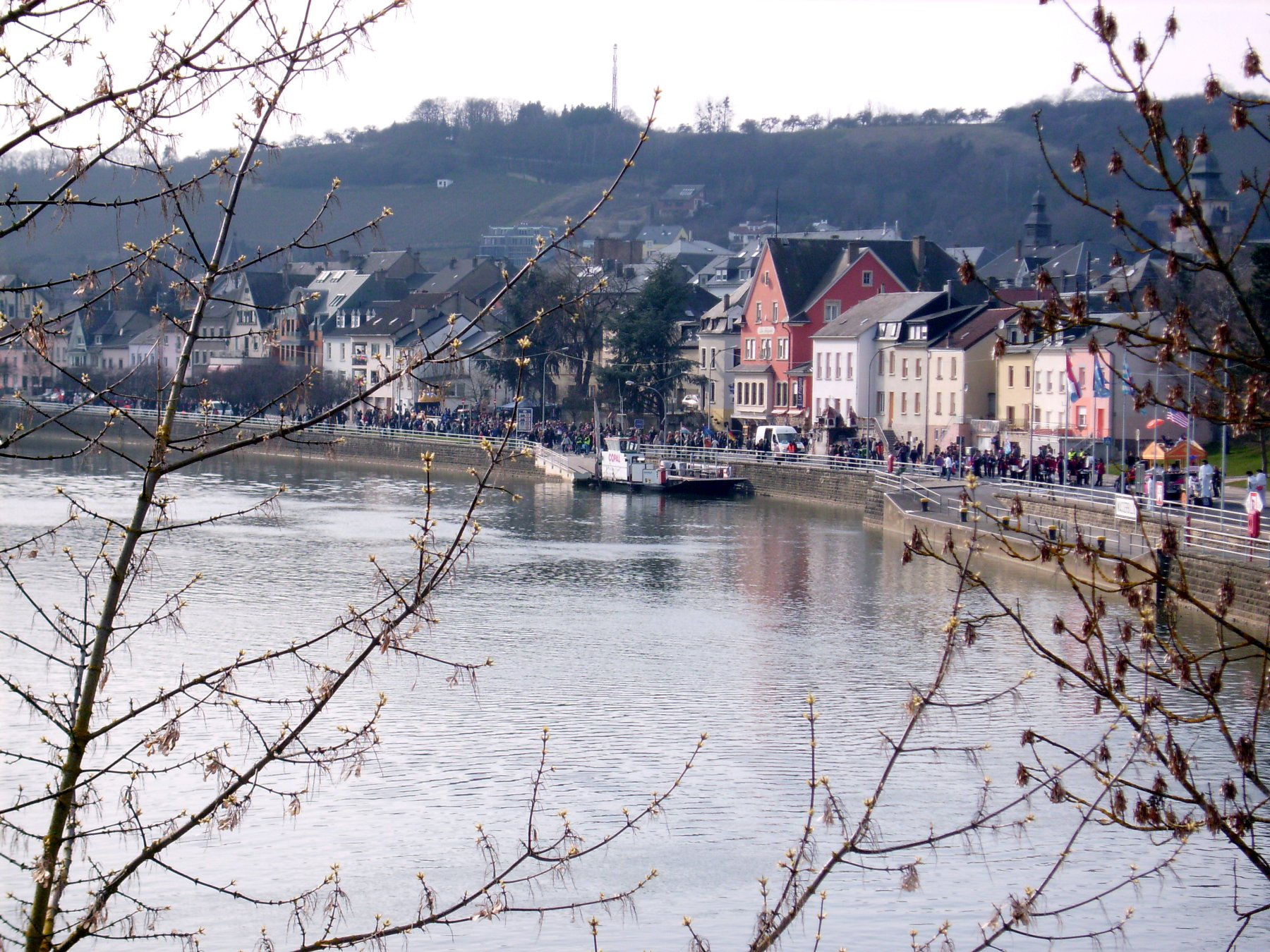
Wasserbillig

=== Esch-Belval ===
Belval is a district of Esch-sur-Alzette in the south of Luxembourg. It is located in the Minett region, also known as the “Land of the Red Earth,” directly on the border with France and Belgium. In the past, Belval was an important industrial site. Starting in 1911, the Luxembourg steel company ARBED produced steel here, shaping Luxembourg’s economic upswing. For almost 100 years, blast furnaces and factory halls defined the character of this area.

With the 2000s came a profound transformation. The industrial facilities were shut down, and Belval developed into a modern urban district for work, study, and leisure. Today, history and future are impressively intertwined here. The two remaining blast furnaces (the last ones in Luxembourg) were preserved as industrial monuments and have been protected since July 18, 2000. Tourists can visit one of the blast furnaces and experience the impressive industrial architecture up close. Guided tours vividly explain the history of steel production, while the second blast furnace is now used for modern facilities. They serve as reminders of the significant role the steel industry played for Luxembourg and shape the historical heritage of the district.

On the site, the “Cité des Sciences” emerged, a modern campus of the University of Luxembourg. At its center stands the “Maison du Savoir”, a striking 85-meter-high tower that echoes the proportions of the old blast furnaces. A central part of the campus is the university library, the Luxembourg Learning Center (LLC). It is located in the former Möllerei, the ore-sorting building between the two remaining blast furnaces and combines history and the present. The steel architecture was preserved and complemented with modern elements. The LLC is accessible not only to students but also to the public. Visitors can freely enter the library, explore spaces of knowledge, and experience the unique combination of industrial history and contemporary architecture. Anyone interested in science, research, or architecture will find inspiring insights here.

Yet Belval offers much more than education and research. After discovering the academic side of the district, visitors can explore its lively urban environment. Belval Plaza is the vibrant heart of the area, where people meet to shop and eat. Cafés, restaurants, and international cuisines offer culinary variety. Visitors can try local and international specialties or, during a stroll, discover modern architecture and street art. Fashion, leisure activities, and the Kinepolis cinema provide entertainment in an urban atmosphere.

Another important place in Belval is the Rockhal, a modern concert hall that opened in 2005. International and local artists perform here, making the Rockhal a cultural meeting point for music lovers from Luxembourg and around the world. It is located in the immediate vicinity of the old blast furnaces, thus connecting industrial history with modern culture.

Belval impressively demonstrates how a former industrial site can be transformed into a modern, diverse urban district offering education, culture, and leisure. Historical blast furnaces, the university, Belval Plaza, and the Rockhal make it a destination that unites history, present, and future.

=== Other areas of interest ===
The Ardennes in the north of the country present excellent opportunities for ramblers and mountain bikers in an area of forested hills, rocky crags and green valleys. Additional attractions are the castles of Bourscheid, Brandenbourg, Clervaux, Esch-sur-Sûre, Vianden and Wiltz as well as the Lac de la Haute-Sûre which provides opportunities for swimming and water sports.

The Mullerthal, just north of Echternach, also offers interesting walking and cycling circuits through curious rock formations, often complete with caves. The motorist too can experience a surprising variety of countryside driving through the river valleys and up to the surprisingly flat plains above. Berdorf and Beaufort are popular tourist centres.

Mondorf-les-Bains in the south of the country not only has a range of modern spa and fitness facilities but is home to Luxembourg's only gambling facility, Casino 2000. Not far from Mondorf is one of the Luxembourg's most interesting Roman sites, Dalheim Ricciacum, with its old Roman theatre.

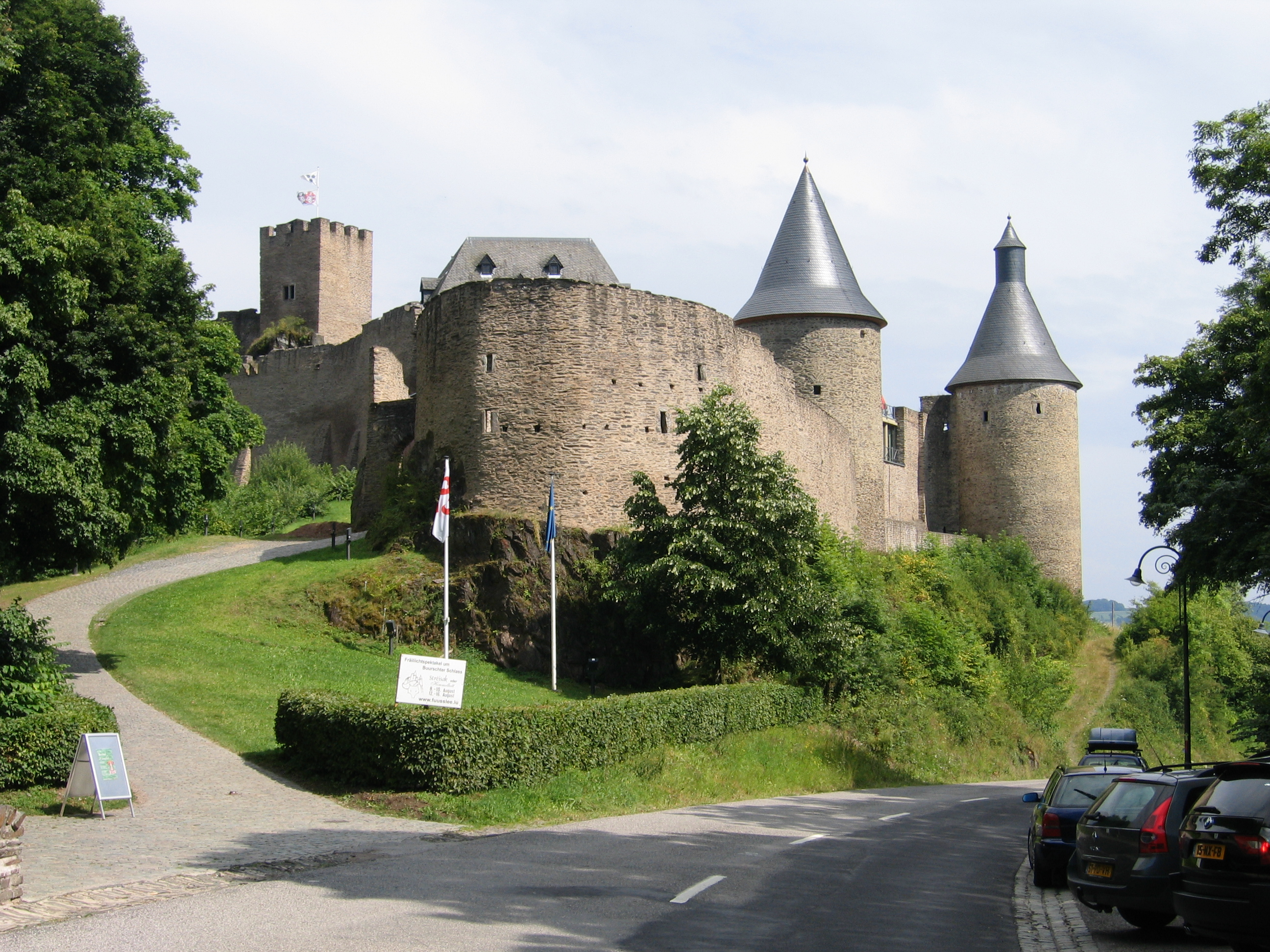
Bourscheid Castle

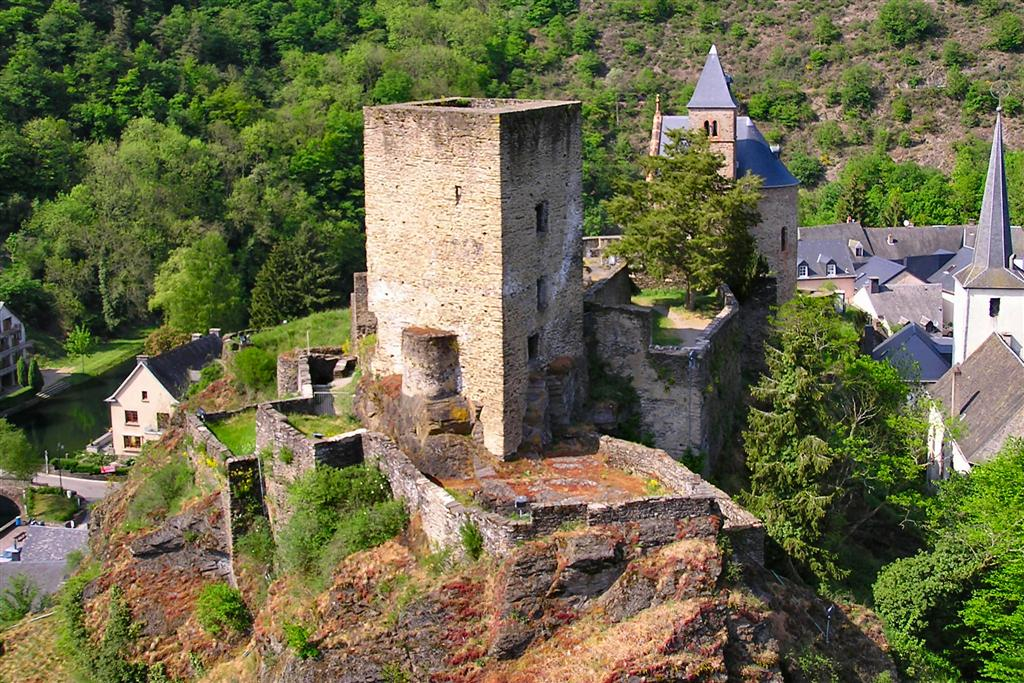
Esch-sur-Sûre

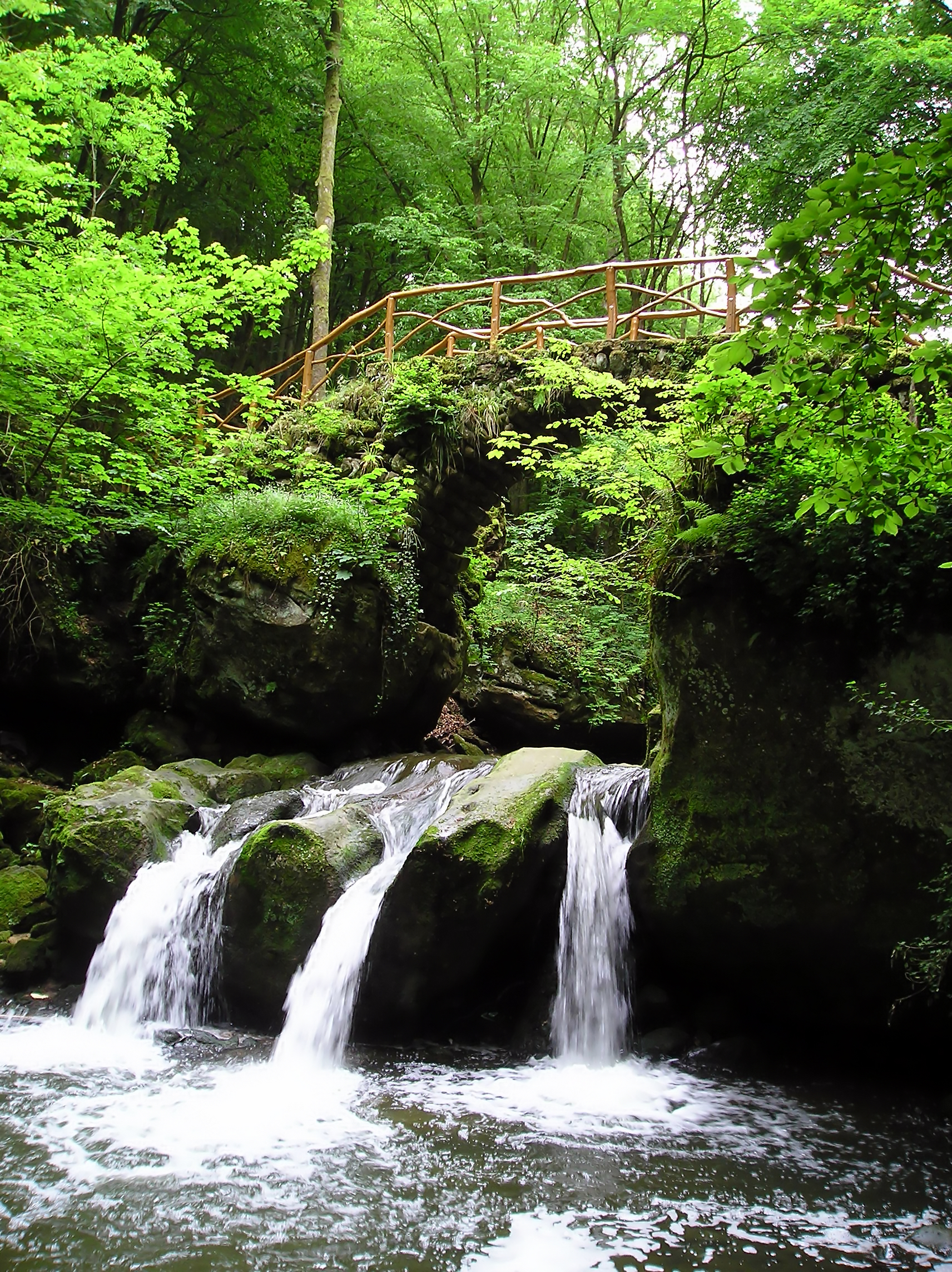
Mullerthal

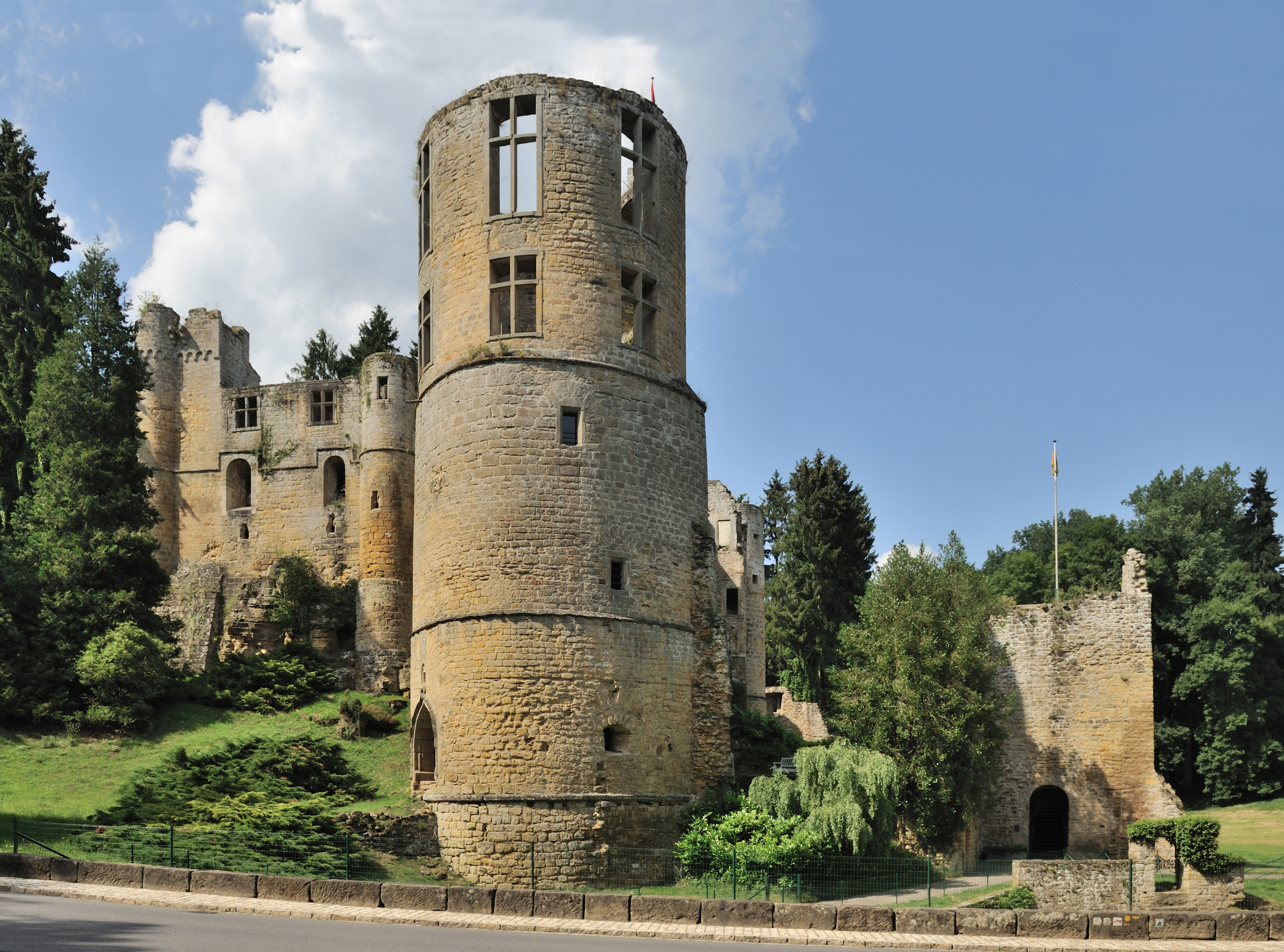
Beaufort Castle

== Attractions ==
The Bock casemates in Luxembourg City are open daily from 10 am to 5 pm from March to October. Now a UNESCO heritage site, these underground passages were part of Luxembourg's former defences.

The National Museum of Military History at Diekirch in the central part of Luxembourg provides insights into the Battle of the Bulge and related episodes of World War II. The museum is open every day from 10 am to 6 pm.

Les Thermes, an indoor/outdoor water park in Strassen just west of Luxembourg City, offers an olympic swimming pool, two pools for children, wave baths, slides and sauna.

From April to early October, the Parc Merveilleux near Bettembourg has a range of attractions for children including rides, mini zoo, and fairy tale presentations.

The historic steam Train 1900 operates between Petange and Fond-de-Gras in the south-east of Luxembourg on Sunday afternoons between May and September. From Fond-de-Gras, trips on the Minièresbunn narrow gauge railway are also possible.

The National Mining Museum in Rumelange, south-east Luxembourg, is open April to September from Thursday to Sunday, 2 pm to 6 pm. Lasting about an hour and a half, the visit includes a 20-minute trip on the old railway deep into the mine.

The Butterfly Garden in Grevenmacher is open every day from April to mid-October.

The Lankelz Railway in Esch-sur-Alzette, south-eastern Luxembourg, is a miniature railway on a scale of one third normal size. The railway operates on Sunday afternoons and public holidays from May to mid-October.

The Aquarium is located in Wasserbillig, a small town in the south west of Luxembourg. Open every day from Easter to the end of September, it is otherwise open every Friday, Saturday and Sunday. There are 15 tanks from 300 to 40,000 litres with fish from all five continents in their natural surroundings.

== See also ==
- List of castles in Luxembourg
- List of museums in Luxembourg
