= List of museums in Luxembourg =

This is a list of museums in Luxembourg.

== Museums in all of Luxembourg ==
- A Gadder
- Abbey Museum
- Am Tunnel
- Casino Luxembourg
- European Museum Schengen
- General Patton Museum
- Industry and Railway Park Fond-de-Gras
- Konschthal Esch
- Kulturhuef Asbl
- Luxembourgish Aviation Museum
- Luxembourg City History Museum
- Luxembourg Science Center
- MNM Rumelange
- MUDAM
- Muerbelsmillen
- Musée de l'Ardoise
- Musée Automobile - Conservatoire National de Véhicules Historiques
- Musée de la caricature
- Musée Dräi Eechelen
- Musee the Family of Man
- Musée d'Histoire(s) Diekirch
- Musée Littéraire 'Victor Hugo'
- Musée A Possen
- Musee Rural
- Musée Rural Asbl
- Musée Rural Binsfeld
- Museum-Memorial of Deportation
- Luxembourg Science Center, Differdange
- National Audiovisual Centre
- National Mining Museum, Luxembourg
- National Museum of History and Art
- National Museum of Military History (Luxembourg)
- National Museum of Natural History (Luxembourg)
- National Resistance Museum, Luxembourg
- Photothèque (Luxembourg)
- Prehistory Museum, Echternach
- Rural and Artisanal Museum
- Thillenvogtei
- Tram and Bus Museum
- Tudor Museum
- Valentiny Foundation
- Vianden City History Museum
- Villa Vauban
- Waassertuerm + Pomhouse
- Wiltz Castle
- Wine Museum, Ehnen

== See also ==
- List of museums
- Tourism in Luxembourg
- Culture of Luxembourg
