= Wine Museum, Ehnen =

Museum in Ehnen, Luxembourg

- Musée du Vin
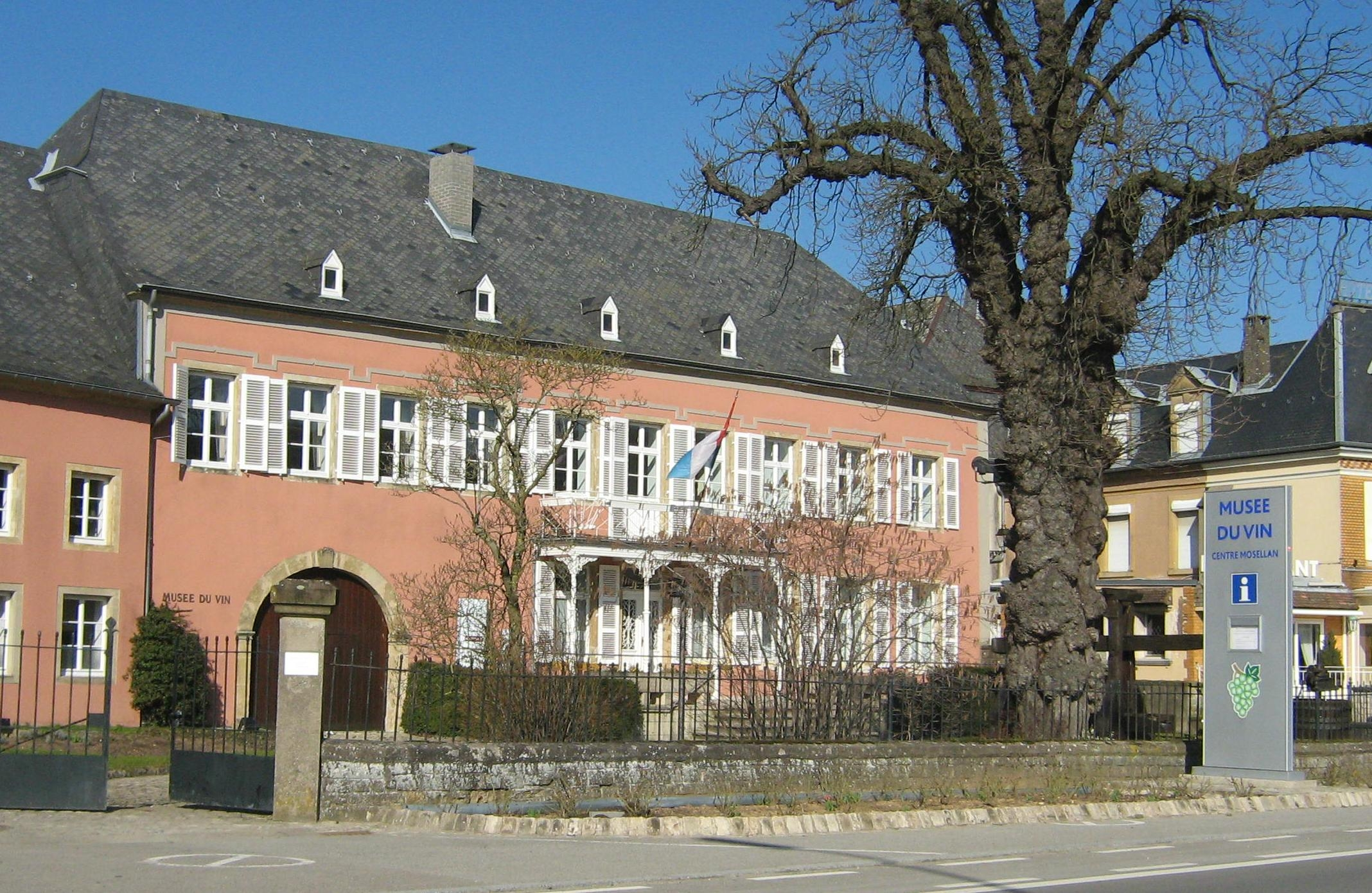
- Wine Museum, Ehnen

- Location of the Wine Museum in Ehnen, Luxembourg
- Established: 1978
- Coordinates: 49°36′2.37″N 6°23′11.13″E

The Wine Museum (Luxembourgish: Wäimusée; French: Musée du Vin; German: Weinmuseum), located in Ehnen on the Luxembourg side of the Moselle, illustrates the art of wine-making with exhibits of traditional vintner's tools and bottling equipment together with old documents and photographs. The property was acquired by the state in 1974 and opened as a museum in 1978. It occupies the home of a former vintner with winemaking antiques and furnishings. The museum is one of the main sites of the annual Riesling Open wine festival.

== The museum ==
The Wine Museum in Ehnen illustrates the art of wine-making with exhibits of traditional vintner's tools and bottling equipment together with old documents and photographs. The property was acquired by the state in 1974 and opened as a museum in 1978. It occupies the home of a former vintner with winemaking antiques and furnishings. In 2025 the museum is closed for renovation, with no announced reopening date. After the renovation the museum will be known as the "Wäinhaus - Wine discovery center".

Standing close to the banks of the river, the 18th-century house belonged to the prosperous Wellenstein family. The premises also house a cooperage showing how barrels were made, a large wine press, a smithy and the former Ehnen office of weights and measures. The museum exhibits demonstrate the process of wine-making from growing the grapes to bottling the wine. Many of the items in the museum have been donated by local vintners. There is also a small vineyard with all the local grape varieties. As these grapes are grown on government land, the wine made from them is served at official functions such as embassy dinners.

The museum is open from April through October, and is one of the main sites of the annual Riesling Open wine festival in September.

== See also ==
- List of museums in Luxembourg
