= Prehistory Museum, Echternach =

Museum in Echternach, Luxembourg

Coordinates: 49.8128°N 6.4231°E

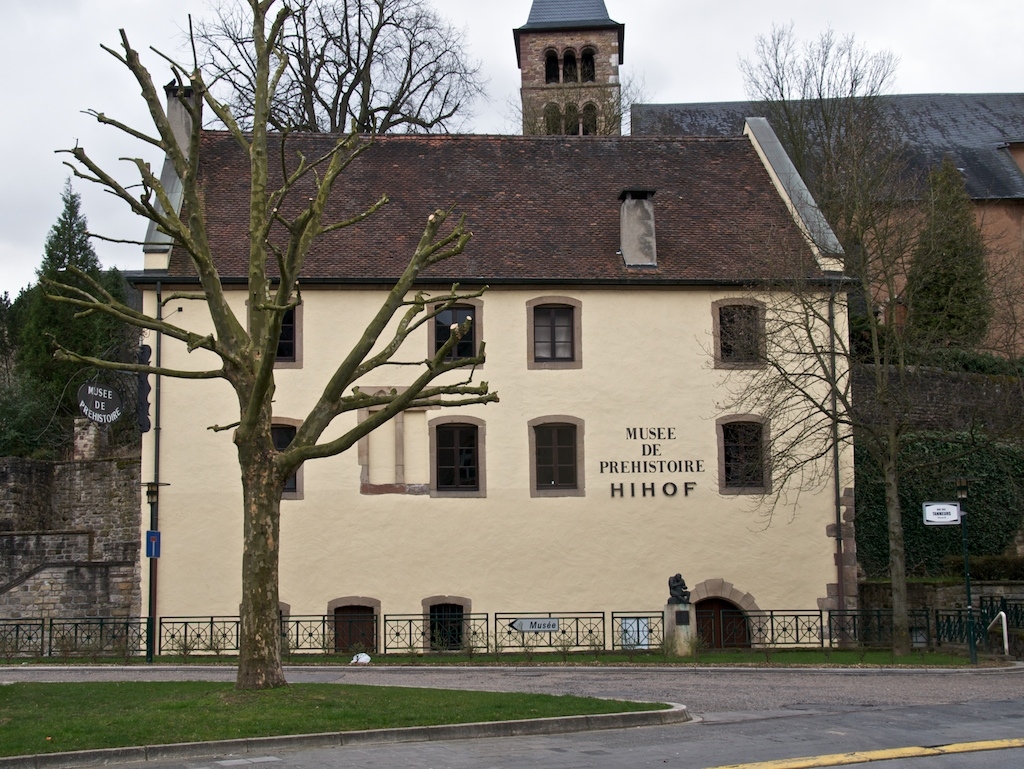
Musée de préhistoire, Echternach

The Prehistory Museum (Luxembourgish: Musée fir Virgeschicht; French: Musée de la préhistoire) in Echternach, Luxembourg, houses a collection of prehistoric artefacts principally from Luxembourg, northern Europe and France testifying to the history of mankind for more than a million years. It is located in the 15th century Hihof building in the centre of the town.

== The Hihof ==
The Gothic Hihof building is adjacent to the church of Peter and Paul on the corner of the Rue du Pont. At the beginning of the 19th century, it housed the local grammar school. It has also hosted a ceramic workshop and a hospice. The museum was inaugurated in 1984.

== The collection ==
The stoneage artefacts displayed in some 30 showcases include chopping tools, arrow tips, axes, daggers and grinding stones. There are explanations of how the tools were produced and used in practice. Some of the tools are from as far afield as North America, Africa and Papua and New Guinea. Life in the various prehistoric periods is illustrated with prehistoric skulls and reconstructions of old machines for sawing, weaving and threshing. There are also a number of video presentations.

== Opening hours ==
From 1 April to 15 November, the museum is open from 10 am to 12 noon and from 2 pm to 5 pm every day except Mondays. In July and August, it is open from 10 am to 5 pm without a break. The museum also participates in the annual Museum Night, when museums across Luxembourg open late and put on special events.

== See also ==
- List of museums in Luxembourg
