= Luxembourg City History Museum =

Museum in Luxembourg City

- Lëtzebuerg City Museum
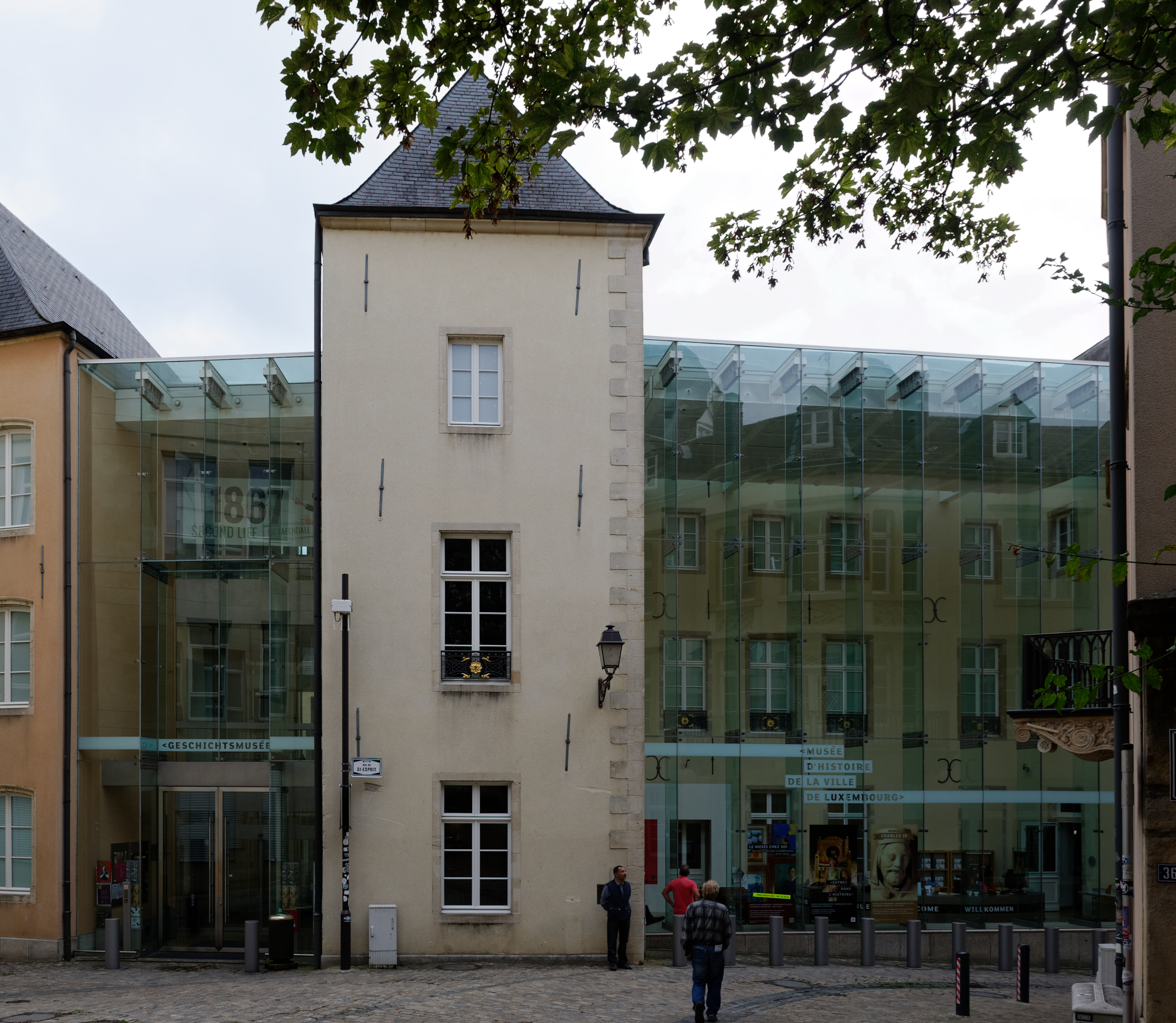
- Lëtzebuerg City Museum
- Established: 22 June 1996
- Location: City of Luxembourg
- Coordinates: 49.6099°N 6.1335°E
- Website: citymuseum.lu

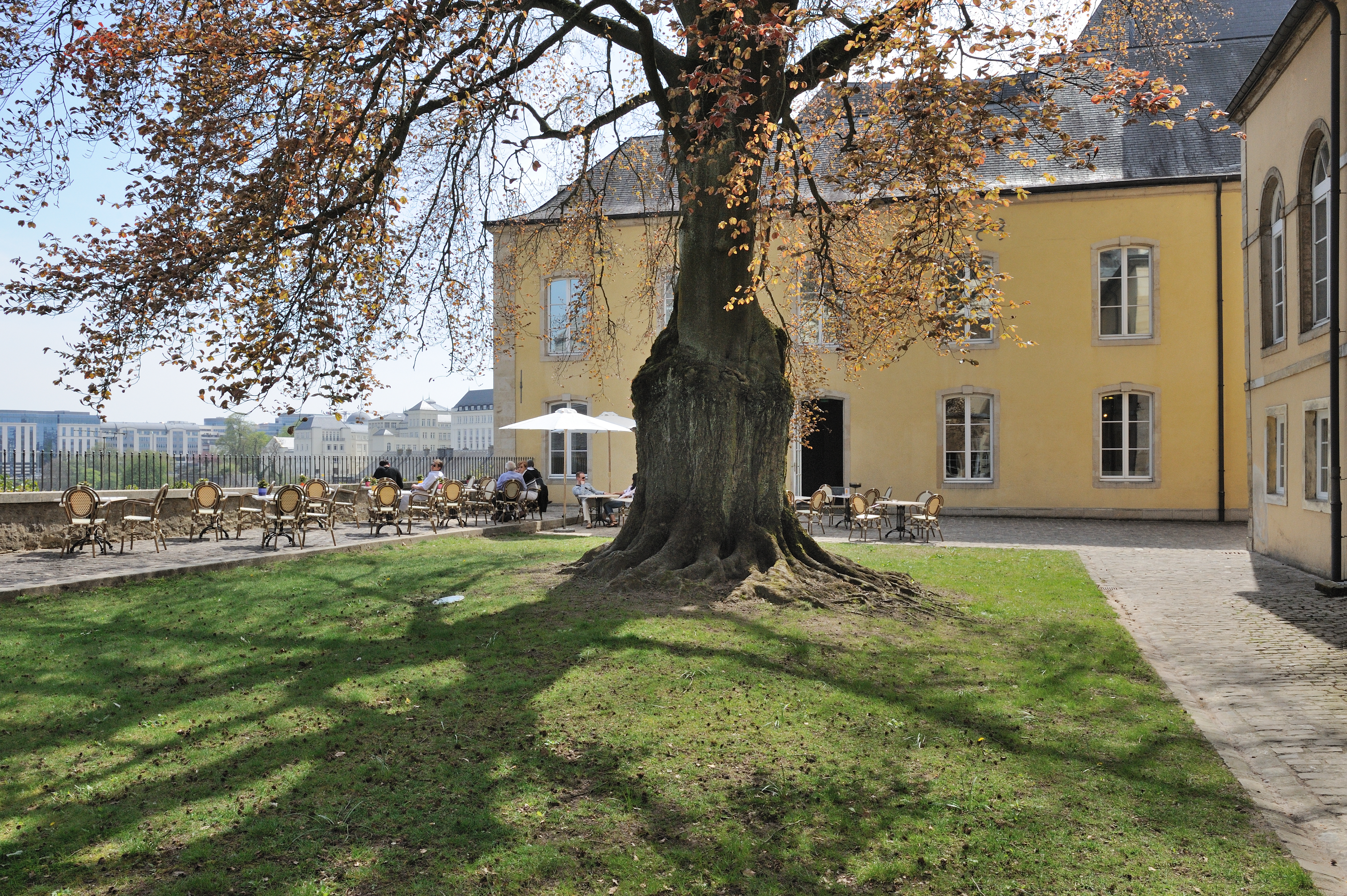
Courtyard and terrace of the museum

The Lëtzebuerg City Museum (before May 2017: Luxembourg City History Museum (French: Musée d'histoire de la Ville de Luxembourg; Luxembourgish: Geschichtsmusée vun der Stad Lëtzebuerg)), illustrates the thousand-year history of the City of Luxembourg with both permanent and temporary exhibits. Founded on 22 June 1996, it was designed by Luxembourg architect Conny Lentz and Repérages, Paris.

== The museum ==
Like the city itself, the museum successfully combines ancient architecture with modern extensions. It is housed in four restored houses from the 17th to the 19th century which still bear archeological traces from the Middle Ages. Examples of how to combine old buildings with the expectations of museum visitors are the floating glass façade and the panoramic lift which offers extensive views of all floors. The huge glass cage of the lift gives up to 65 people views of the rock foundations on the lower levels as well as views of the city's Grund district and Rham plateau on the upper levels, revealing the stages of Luxembourg's history over the centuries. Also of interest are the ancient, vaulted cellars which were discovered during excavation work in the early 1990s.

The floors below the street level entrance house a permanent collection illustrating the town's architectural and urban development while the upper floors are reserved for temporary exhibitions. A multimedia system extending throughout the building documents the history of the town including its cultural, political and social development. It provides access to some ten thousand documents and almost sixty audio-visual sequences.

== Location ==
The museum is located on the rue du Saint-Esprit in the old town. It is open to the public every day except Monday from 10 am to 6 pm.

== See also ==
- List of museums in Luxembourg
