= Industry and Railway Park Fond-de-Gras =

Mining and railway museum in Lasauvage, Luxembourg

Coordinates: 49.5349°N 5.8594°E

The Minett Park Fond-de-Gras is an open-air museum that encompasses various historical sites, including Fond-de-Gras, the village of Lasauvage, the former open-pit mine "Giele Botter" and the Celtic oppidum of Titelberg. Due to its wide thematic scope, the Minett Park offers a range of complementary activities, all of which are unified by the common thread of iron ore.

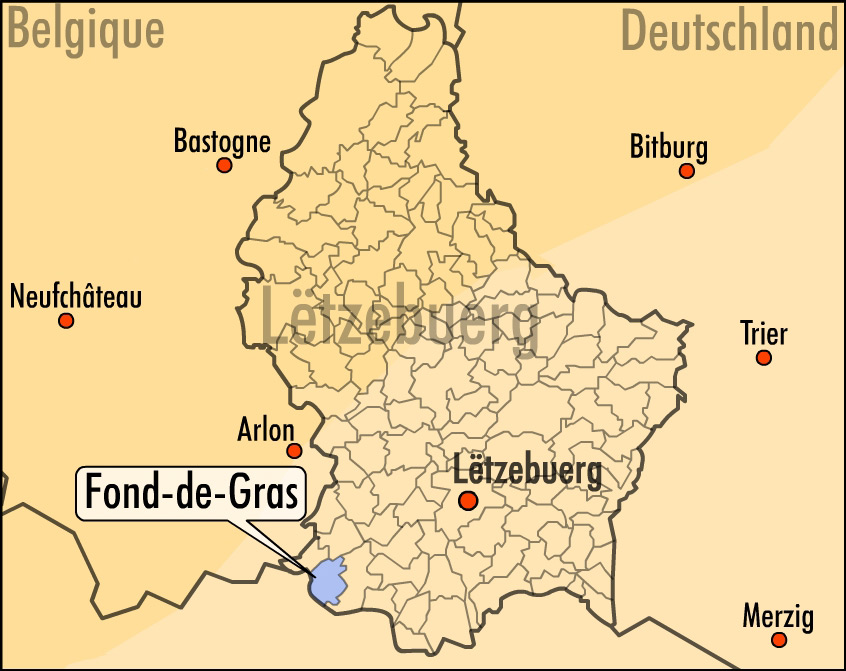
Localisation

It is located in southern Luxembourg.

== A little history ==
The iron ore deposit in southern Luxembourg is part of the largest European deposit, covering an area of approximately 110,000 hectares. However, only a small portion of this deposit, roughly 3,700 hectares, lies within Luxembourg's borders. The majority of the deposit extends into France, specifically in the Lorraine region.

Historically, the Fond-de-Gras was one of the most important mining centres in Luxembourg. A few years after the closure of the last mine at the Fond-de-Gras in 1964, a few volunteers worked to preserve part of the railway line with the aim of operating a tourist train on the line. The first train ran in 1973.

== Fond-de-Gras ==
At the Fond-de-Gras, several historic buildings have been preserved as a testament to the region's rich mining history, which spanned nearly a century. These preserved buildings include an electric power station, an old grocery store, a rolling mill train, a railway station, and railway sheds. Additionally, two historic trains still circulate :

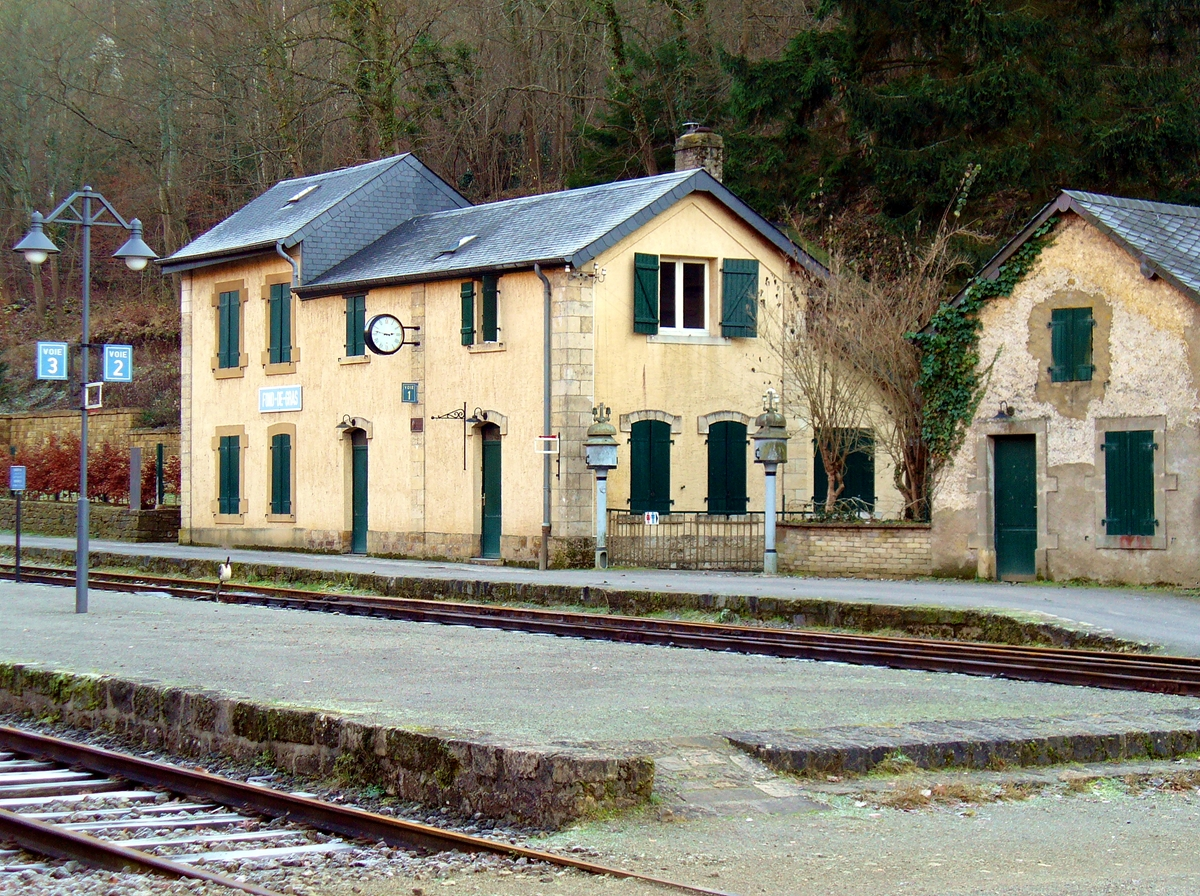
Station Fond-de-Gras

=== Train 1900 ===
The Train 1900 runs between Pétange and Fond-de-Gras, on the former "Mining Line". The train line, which was originally opened in 1874 to transport iron ore from nearby mines, now offers a journey back in time. Visitors can ride on historic trains and enjoy a glimpse into the past, making it a truly special experience.

=== Minièresbunn ===
Back when the mines were operational, mining trains were vital for removing the iron ore carriages from the mine. At present, the Minièresbunn runs between Fond-de-Gras and Lasauvage and offers a sensational experience when visiting the bottom of the mine.

== Lasauvage ==
One of the oldest iron and steel facilities in Luxembourg was located in Lasauvage: a forge built around 1625. The village experienced spectacular growth owing to the Count of Saintignon. This French industrialist at the time owned mines in Lasauvage and built many buildings in the village: houses for the workers, a church, village hall, etc. Many of these buildings are still standing today and bestow the village with exceptional charm.

3 galleries and museums are in Lasauvage :

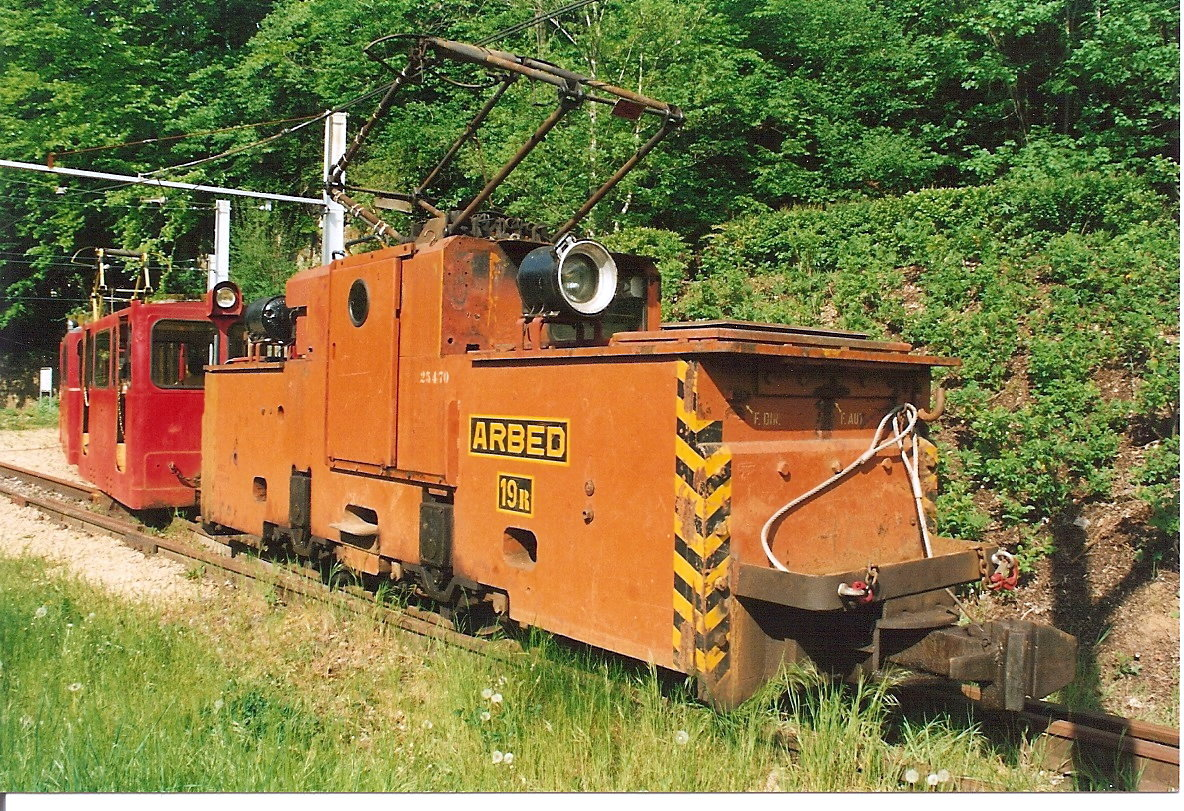
Mining train "Minièresbunn"

- The miner's old changing room, the Salle des Pendus

- The museum Eugène Pesch showcases a collection of fossils, minerals and old mining tools

- The Espace Muséologique de Lasauvage is dedicated to the village's history and to a group of young people, who had to hide in a mine, in order to avoid the Wehrmacht's uniform during World War II.

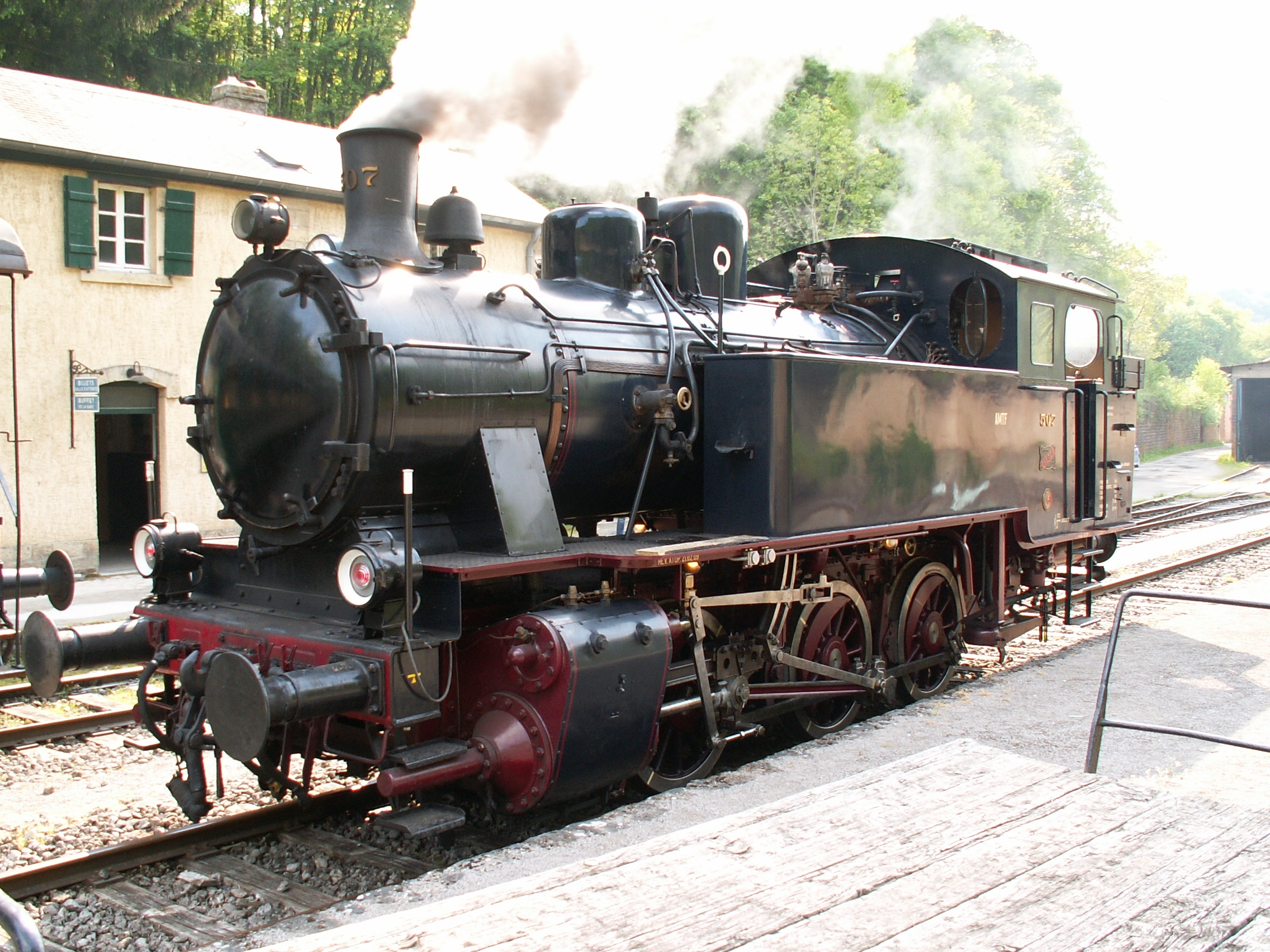
Train 1900

== Nature and archaeology ==
The Minett Park Fond-de-Gras extends between green valleys, plateaus bathed in sunlight and vast forests, making it the ideal destination for breathtaking walks. This lays to rest the notion that the south of Luxembourg was ruined by its industrial past. The former Giele Botter open-cast mine has undergone a remarkable transformation, being converted into a 100-hectare nature reserve. This once-industrial site is now being reclaimed by nature, as flora and fauna return and thrive in the area, creating a unique and diverse ecosystem. At the time of the Celts, the site of Titelberg played a major role due to an important oppidum erected in the first century BC. The excavations carried out at Titelberg testify that it was the capital of the Treviri tribe.

== Draisines - Rail-Bike ==
6 draisines (4 seat rail bikes) are circulating on the track linking the Fond-de-Gras with the Bois-de-Rodange.

== See also ==
- List of museums in Luxembourg
