= Grevenmacher District =

Coordinates: 49°40′N 6°25′E

Map of Grevenmacher district with its cantons in red

The District of Grevenmacher (1843 – 3 Oct 2015) was one of three districts of Luxembourg. It contained three cantons divided into 25 communes:

1. Echternach
  - Beaufort
  - Bech
  - Berdorf
  - Consdorf
  - Echternach
  - Rosport-Mompach
  - Waldbillig
2. Grevenmacher
  - Betzdorf
  - Biwer
  - Flaxweiler
  - Grevenmacher
  - Junglinster
  - Manternach
  - Mertert
  - Wormeldange
3. Remich
  - Bous
  - Burmerange
  - Dalheim
  - Lenningen
  - Mondorf-les-Bains
  - Remerschen
  - Remich
  - Stadtbredimus
  - Waldbredimus
  - Wellenstein

It bordered the districts of Luxembourg to the west and Diekirch to the north, the German Länder of Rhineland-Palatinate and Saarland to the east, and the French département of Moselle, Grand Est to the south. It had a per capita income of $57,800.

After the reorganization of Luxembourg's administrative divisions in 2015, all three districts were abolished per 3 October 2015.
