= Grand Ducal Police =

National law enforcement agency of Luxembourg

Grand Ducal Police Groussherzoglech Police Großherzogliche Polizei Police grand-ducale
- Official logo

Agency overview
- Formed: 1 January 2000
- Preceding agency: Grand Ducal Gendarmerie and local police under state authority.

Jurisdictional structure
- National agency: Luxembourg
- Operations jurisdiction: Luxembourg
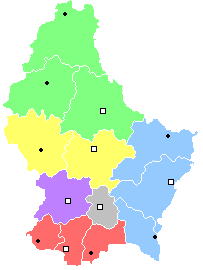
- Policing for the Grand Ducal Police is organized under six primary intervention centres, under which further secondary intervention centres operate.
- General nature: Local civilian police

Operational structure
- Agency executive: Philippe Schrantz, Director-General

Website
- Official Site

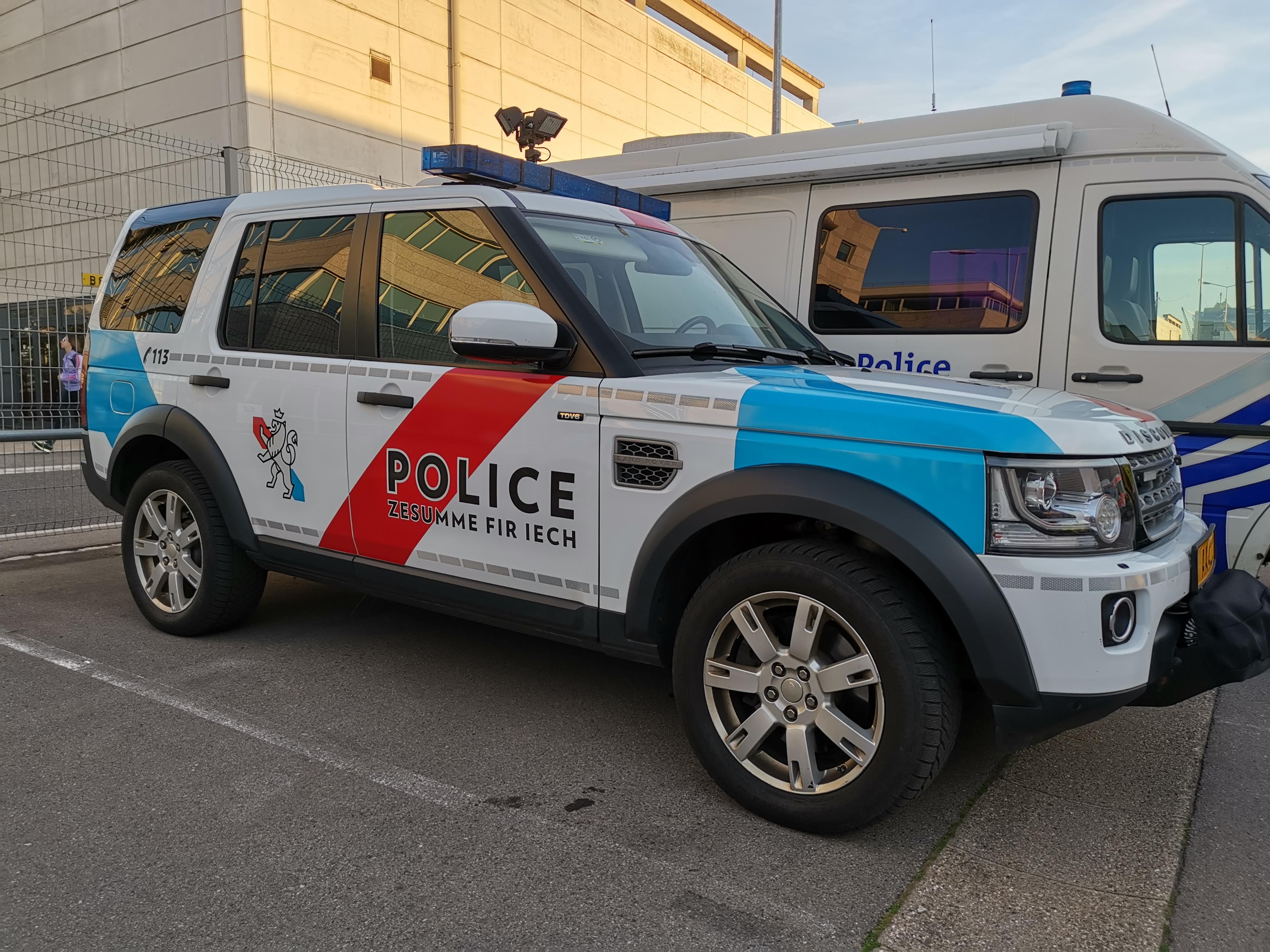
Grand Ducal Police Land Rover Discovery.

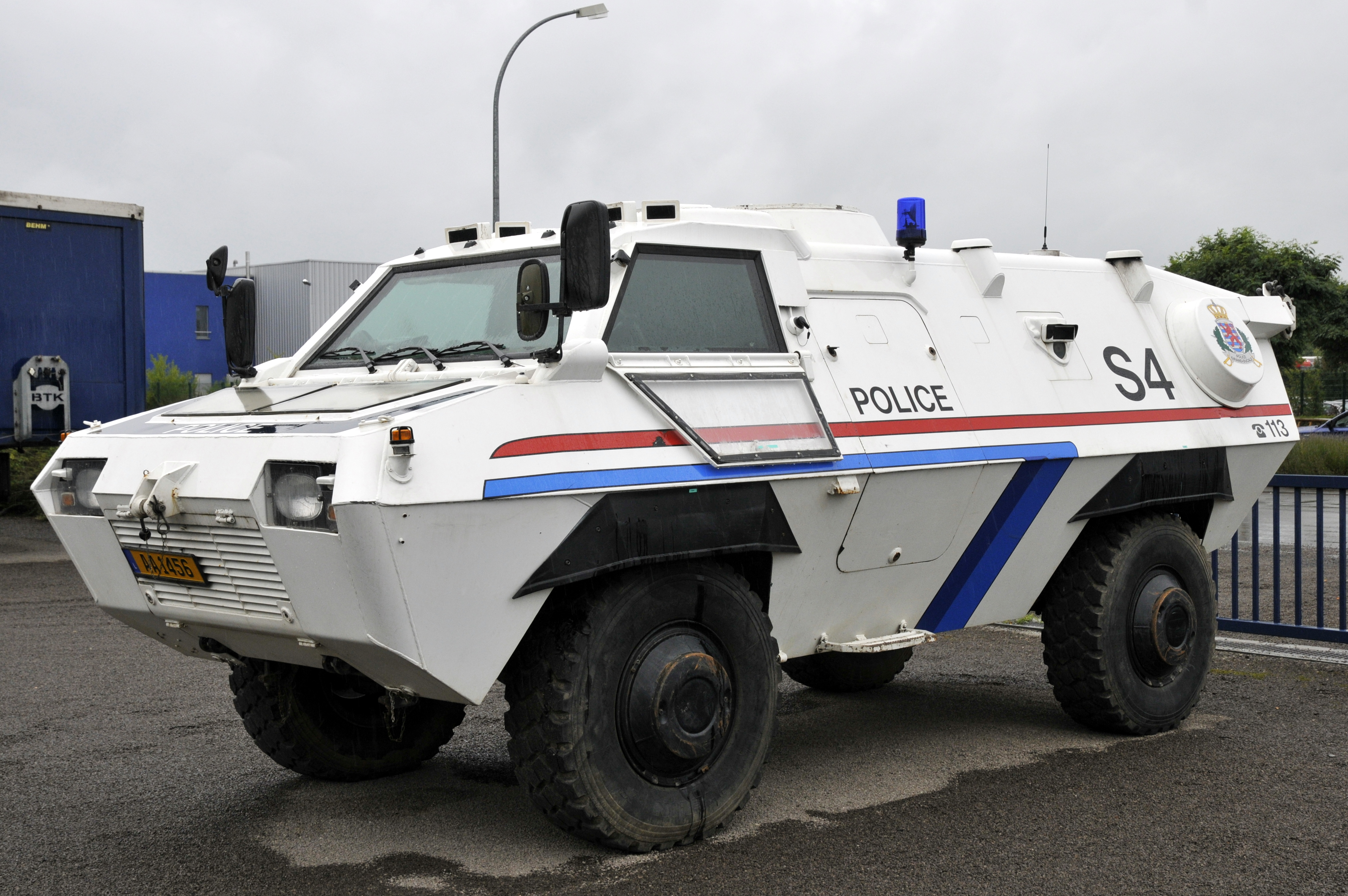
TM-170, Grand Ducal Police armored vehicle.

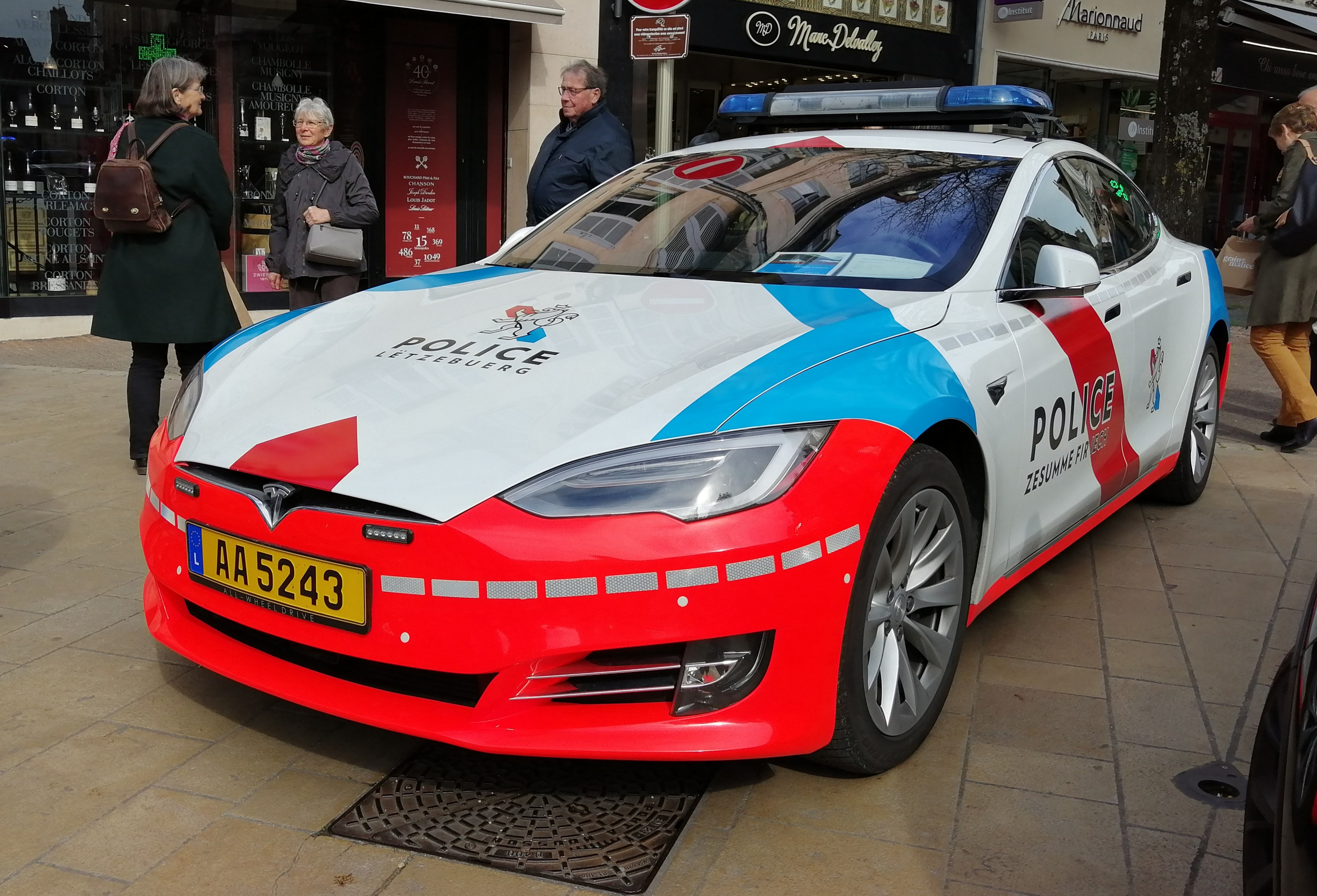
Tesla Model S of the Grand Ducal Police Road Police Unit - UPR.

The Grand Ducal Police (Luxembourgish: Groussherzoglech Police; German: Großherzogliche Polizei; French: Police grand-ducale) is the national police force of the Grand Duchy of Luxembourg. The police is under the control of the Minister for the Interior of Luxembourg, although they operate in the name, and under the ultimate control, of the Grand Duke of Luxembourg. Day-to-day executive control is exercised by the Director-General of the Grand Ducal Police. The Grand Ducal Police has existed in its current form since 1 January 2000, when the Grand Ducal Gendarmerie was merged with the police service.

The Grand Ducal Police is responsible for ensuring the Grand Duchy of Luxembourg's internal security, maintaining law and order, border control and enforcing all laws and Grand Ducal decrees. It is also responsible for assisting the Luxembourg Armed Forces in its internal operations, as prescribed by the Grand Duke of Luxembourg.

== Organization ==
The Grand Ducal Police's operations are divided into six regions (circonscriptions régionales), which are under the command of a regional director. The director is responsible for primary intervention centres, secondary intervention centres, local police stations, and region-wide services. The region headquarters are in Capellen, Diekirch, Esch-sur-Alzette, Grevenmacher, Luxembourg City, and Mersch.

The primary intervention centres (Centre d'Intervention Primaire, abbreviated 'CIP') are the most capable and best equipped police stations to address emergencies. The CIPs also serve as the headquarters for the region, providing administrative support for the region's other operation centres. The CIPs' jurisdictions cover their respective regions (illustrated in different colours on the map, right).

Under the six CIPs are thirteen 'secondary intervention centre' (Centre d'Intervention Secondaire, abbreviated 'CIS'). As the CIPs perform the role of the CISs, as well as their own functions, there are seven dedicated CISs, located in Differdange, Dudelange, Echternach, Redange, Remich, Troisvierges, and Wiltz.

Local police stations (Commissariat de Proximité, abbreviated 'CP') operate separately from the CISs and CIPs, but are under the control of the regional director. In addition to the thirteen CIPs and CISs, which perform the role of CPs, there are thirty-eight dedicated local stations, distributed across the main towns and cities of Luxembourg. Eight of these dedicated CPs are in Luxembourg City, in addition to the CIP.

A special police division at Luxembourg – Findel Airport is directly responsible for border control.

The regional police forces are also directly responsible for policing the roads, criminal investigation, and providing aid to victims of crime.

Officers are armed with the Heckler & Koch VP9 (SFP9 model in use) chambered in 9×19mm

CIP	CIS	Communes	Population (As of 2005)	Area (km^{2})
Capellen				
Capellen	Capellen	Bertrange, Clemency, Dippach, Garnich, Habscht, Kehlen, Koerich, Kopstal, Mamer, Steinfort, Strassen	43,134	208.17
Diekirch				
Diekirch	Diekirch	Bettendorf, Bourscheid, Colmar-Berg, Consthum, Diekirch, Ermsdorf, Erpeldange, Ettelbruck, Feulen, Hoscheid, Medernach, Mertzig, Putscheid, Reisdorf, Schieren, Tandel, Vianden	33,090	320.71
Diekirch	Troisvierges	Clervaux, Heinerscheid, Hosingen, Munshausen, Troisvierges, Weiswampach, Wincrange	12,625	316.80
Diekirch	Wiltz	Boulaide, Esch-sur-Sûre, Goesdorf, Heiderscheid, Kiischpelt, Lac de la Haute-Sûre, Neunhausen, Wiltz, Winseler	12,460	264.55
Esch-sur-Alzette				
Esch-sur-Alzette	Differdange	Bascharage, Differdange, Pétange, Sanem	54,459	77.67
Esch-sur-Alzette	Dudelange	Bettembourg, Dudelange, Frisange, Roeser, Weiler-la-Tour	36,104	102.17
Esch-sur-Alzette	Esch-sur-Alzette	Esch-sur-Alzette, Kayl, Leudelange, Mondercange, Reckange-sur-Mess, Rumelange, Schifflange	57,824	99.14
Grevenmacher				
Grevenmacher	Echternach	Beaufort, Bech, Berdorf, Consdorf, Echternach, Junglinster, Rosport-Mompach, Waldbillig	20,499	240.92
Grevenmacher	Grevenmacher	Betzdorf, Biwer, Flaxweiler, Grevenmacher, Lenningen, Manternach, Mertert, Niederanven, Schuttrange, Stadtbredimus, Wormeldange	28,287	243.97
Grevenmacher	Remich	Bous, Burmerange, Contern, Dalheim, Mondorf-les-Bains, Remerschen, Remich, Sandweiler, Waldbredimus, Wellenstein	20,605	125.63
Luxembourg City				
Luxembourg City	Luxembourg City	Hesperange, Luxembourg, Walferdange	94,552	85.74
Mersch				
Mersch	Mersch	Bissen, Fischbach, Heffingen, Helperknapp, Larochette, Lintgen, Lorentzweiler, Mersch, Nommern, Steinsel	26,886	233.40
Mersch	Redange	Beckerich, Ell, Grosbous, Préizerdaul, Rambrouch, Redange, Saeul, Useldange, Vichten, Wahl	14,499	267.49
Total			455,024	2,586

== Director-General ==
The head of the Grand Ducal Police is the Director-General. There have been four Directors-General since the creation of the Grand Ducal Police in 2000.

Name	Start	End
Charles Bourg	2000	2001
Pierre Reuland	2001	2008
Romain Nettgen	2008	2015
Philippe Schrantz	2015	2024
Pascal Peters	2024	present

== Ranks ==
Rank group	Fonctions dirigeantes
Luxembourg Grand Ducal Police
Luxembourg Grand Ducal Police	Directeur général	Directeur général adjoint	Directeur central

Rank group	Commissaires divisionnaires				Commissaires
Luxembourg Grand Ducal Police
Luxembourg Grand Ducal Police	Premier commissaire divisionnaire	Commissaire divisionnaire	Premier commissaire principal	Commissaire principal	Commissaire en chef	Premier commissaire	Commissaire	Commissaire adjoint

Rank group	Inspecteurs
Luxembourg Grand Ducal Police
Luxembourg Grand Ducal Police	Inspecteur-chef	Premier inspecteur	Inspecteur	Inspecteur adjoint

Prior to 2018, the police had a series of Brigadier ranks below those of Inspecteurs.

Rank group	Brigadiers
Luxembourg Grand Ducal Police
Luxembourg Grand Ducal Police	Brigadier-chef	Brigadier principal	Premier brigadier	Brigadier

== Emergencies ==
It is either the CISs or the CIPs that one would contact in the event of an emergency, as they are the only police stations which are continuously open. The emergency telephone number for the police is 113, instead of 112, like the other emergency services.
