= Elvange =

Elvange may refer to:

- Elvange, Moselle, a commune in northeastern France
- Elvange, Luxembourg, a village in southeastern Luxembourg
