= Lady of Schengen =

Occupant of Iron Age tomb in Luxembourg

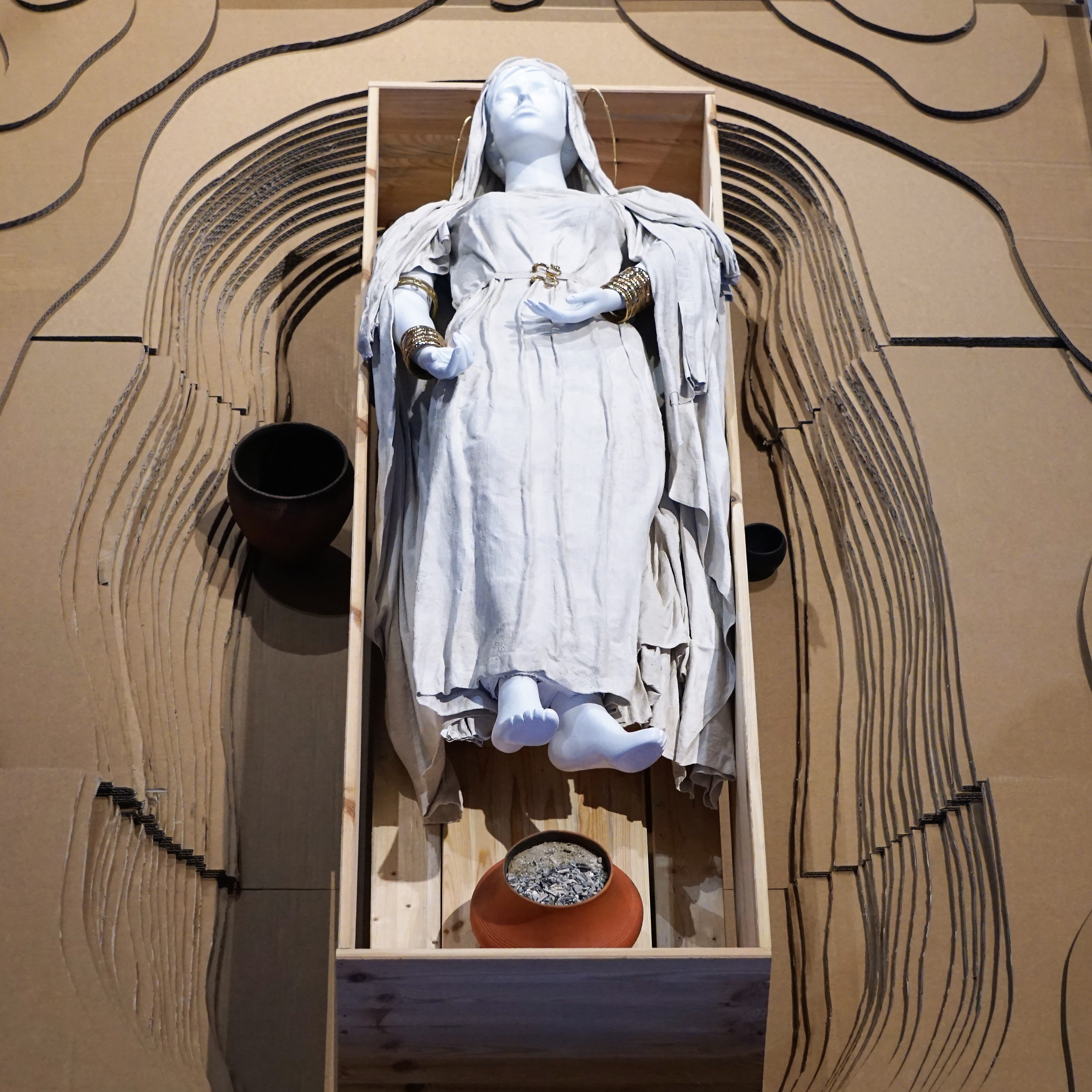
Reconstruction of the grave of the Lady of Schengen, Remerschen, 2019

The Lady of Schengen (Luxembourgish: Prinzessin vu Schengen; German: Die Dame von Schengen) is the name given to a woman who lived in the Iron Age in what is now Luxembourg. Her tomb, dated to the 1st millennium BCE, was discovered and excavated in 1995. Her tomb is known for its rich grave goods. She may have held a significant place in her society, and was possibly a Celtic ruler.

She is also known as the "Princess of Schengen" and the "Lady of the Digging Pond". The tomb of the Lady of Schengen is situated on the banks of the Moselle between Schengen and Remerschen.

== Discovery and analysis ==
In 1995 the National Research Centre for Archaeology in Luxembourg began work at a cemetery site on the banks of the Moselle. The researchers discovered the tomb, or grave, of a woman whom they dubbed "The Lady of Schengen". Archaeologists also found the cremated remains of a man's body in the grave between the Lady of Schengen's feet.

Around 50 other graves dating from the Bronze and Iron Ages were also excavated at the Moselle site.

The Lady of Schengen was buried in highly acidic soil. As a consequence, nearly her entire body was dissolved; only four of her teeth could be recovered. Analysis of the teeth and soil in the grave indicates that she was approximately 35 years old when she died and that she was 1.54m tall. She was buried with a significant assemblage of high-status grave goods, including bronze bracelets, two torcs, and a chiselled triangular plate. Soil samples indicated the presence of wood—possibly a decomposed coffin—in the grave.

Foni Le Brun-Ricalens, the initial excavation leader and Director of the National Research Centre for Archaeology, proposed that the Lady of Schengen held a high status in her society, and was possibly a Celtic ruler.

== Exhibition ==
In 2018 and 2019, the Biodiversum in Remerschen exhibited reconstructions of the Lady of Schengen's tomb and grave goods. Belginum Archäologiepark in Germany exhibited her reconstructed tomb in 2020.
