= Wellenstein =

Wellenstein Wellesteen
- Former commune
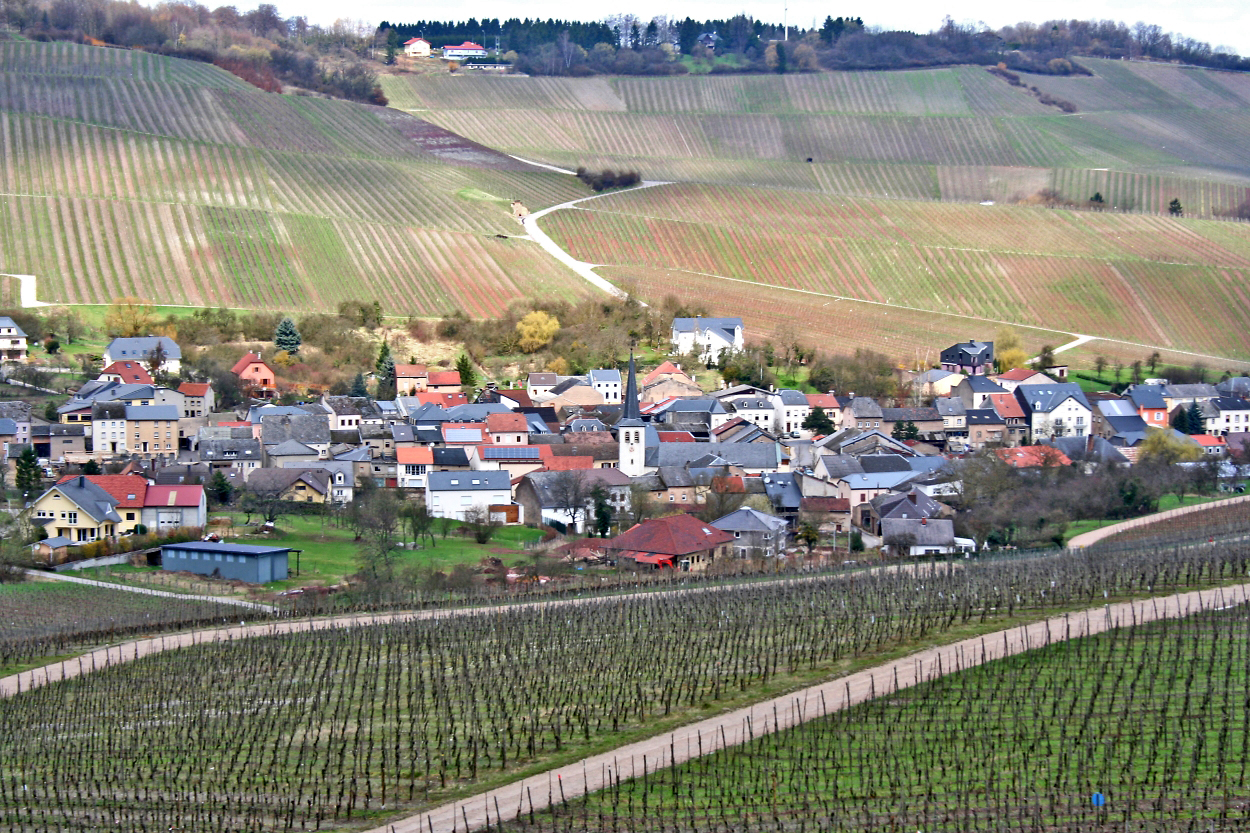

- Coat of arms

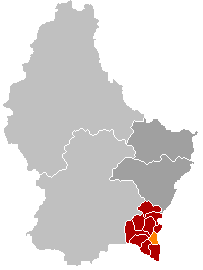
- Map of Luxembourg with Wellenstein highlighted in orange, and the canton in dark red
- Coordinates: 49.5236°N 6.3417°E
- Country: Luxembourg
- Canton: Remich
- commune: Schengen
- Time zone: UTC+1 (CET)
  - Summer (DST): UTC+2 (CEST)
- Website: wellenstein.lu

Wellenstein (German pronunciation: [ˈvɛlənʃtaɪn]; Luxembourgish: Wellesteen) is a small town in southeastern Luxembourg. It is part of the canton of Remich, which is part of the district of Grevenmacher.

It used to be a commune with its administrative centre at Bech-Kleinmacher, until it was merged into Schengen (along with Burmerange) in 2011.

As of September 2026, the town of Wellenstein had a population of 677.

On 25 October 2005, members of the pan-European organisation Cultural Village of Europe offered a declaration on village life to the European Commissioner of Agriculture and Rural Development Mariann Fischer Boel in Wellenstein. This "Declaration of Wellenstein" lists qualities of life in small communities.

== Former commune ==
The former commune consisted of the villages:

- Bech-Kleinmacher
- Schwebsange
- Wellenstein
