= François Valentiny =

Luxembourgish architect (born 1953)

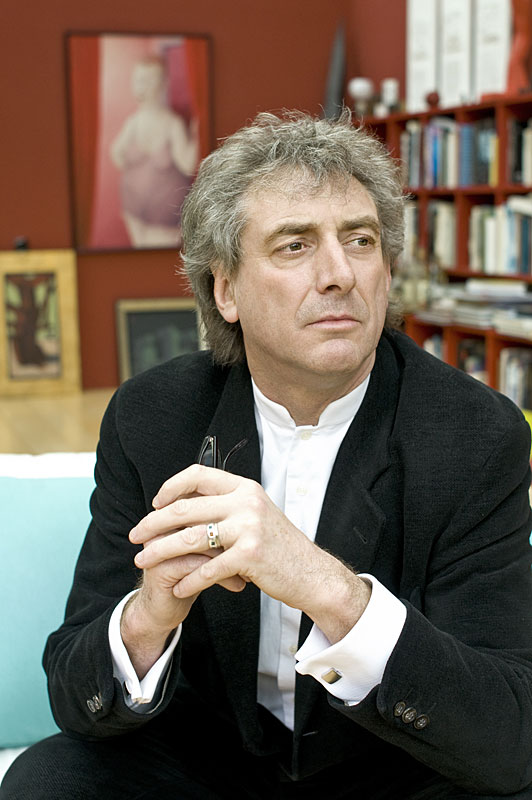
Mag. arch. François J. V. Valentiny

François Valentiny (born 1953 in Remerschen-Schengen, Luxembourg) is a Luxembourgish architect. After his studies in architecture at the Ecole d'Architecture de Nancy and the University of Applied Arts Vienna, in 1980 he formed a partnership with Hubert Hermann, founding the architects' office Hermann & Valentiny in Luxembourg and Vienna. He first advised for the city of Trier, and later became a visiting lecturer at the Department of Architecture, University of Applied Sciences Trier.

== Biography ==
Valentiny was born in 1953 in the village of Remerschen-Schengen, Luxembourg, one of two sons of a carpenter. His parents sent him to boarding school in Belgium at the age of 12, and on his return, he followed the family tradition and became a carpenter. He studied architecture between 1975 and 1980 at the Ecole d'Architecture de Nancy and the University of Applied Arts Vienna.

In 1980 he completed his studies in Vienna with the title "Magister architecturae" in the master class of Wilhelm Holzbauer, and was awarded a scholarship by the Federal Ministry for Science and Research in Vienna. He also became an assistant at the International Summer Academy in Salzburg. In the same year, he formed a partnership with Hubert Hermann, founding the architects' office Hermann & Valentiny in Luxembourg and Vienna.

From 1987 to 1992 he was a visiting lecturer at the Department of Architecture of the University of Applied Sciences Trier, and in 1991 he became Luxembourg's first representative at the Venice Biennale of Architecture

He was a member of the design advisory committee to the City of Salzburg (1991-94), the architecture and urban advisory committee of the City of Trier (1997-2006) and the advisory committee to the German Architecture Museum in Frankfurt (2000-05). In 1997 he founded Hermann & Valentiny et Associés SARL. The company was renamed as Valentiny HVP Architects Sarl in 2012.

Between 2000 and 2003 he was substitute professor at the Leipzig University of Applied Sciences, and in 2002 founded and published the first Luxembourg architecture magazine, Adato. From 2003 to 2007 he was a member of the administration committee of the Fondation de l'Architecture et de l'Ingénierie in Luxembourg, and was Luxembourg's commissioner for the Venice Biennale in both 2004 and 2006.

He was made Président of the Fondation de l'Architecture et de l'Ingénierie in Luxembourg for the year 2006/2007 and in 2006 was awarded the Decoration of Honour in Gold for Services to the Republic of Austria (= 9th Class). In 2008 he was honoured for his overall architectural work in the Grand Duchy and abroad and received the Luxembourg Architecture Prize 2007. In 2009 he became a member of the Academia Scientiarum et Artium Europaea in Salzburg, Austria.

Since 2011 he has been a Master of Community Planning and Green Architectural Design with the Beijing DeTao Masters Academy (DTMA), a higher education institution in Shanghai, China. The DeTao Master Francois Valentiny Studio opened in Shanghai in 2014.

In 2011 he co-founded the Musica em in Trancoso - MeT Festival, and designed the amphitheater in the canyon of Trancoso, Bahia, Brazil. Valentiny established his own foundation, the Valentiny Foundation, in 2014. The foundation opened an office in Remerschen in 2016.

== Building and projects ==
Buildings designed by Valentiny and his studio have been constructed throughout Luxembourg and Austria as well as in Germany (Saarbrücken, Dessau, Cologne, Freilassing, Berlin, Mainz, Trier), the United States (St. Paul, Minnesota), Belgium (Brussels), France (Verdun), Azerbaijan (Baku), Brazil (Brasília, Trancoso), and China (Beijing, Shanghai).

He was also involved in the Austrian and Luxembourg Pavilions for the Seville Expo '92, the latter winning second prize, and the Luxembourg Pavilion at Expo 2010 in Shanghai, China, winning first prize.

Some of Valentiny's buildings are prone to structural problems, most notably the European Museum in Schengen, in which the ceiling collapsed during opening hours.

== Awards ==
Valentiny won the Architecture prize of the State of Sachsen-Anhalt in 1995 for his work on a hotel and service industry complex in Halle an der Saale, Germany, as well as the Architecture Prize of the Fondation l'Architecture et de l'Ingénierie Luxembourg for the Luxembourg Embassy in Vienna, and the Luxembourg Architecture Prize for the best concrete building for a town council building in Bech-Kleinmacher, Luxembourg.

In 2016 Valentiny was awarded the Cruz Europea de Oro by the Fundacion Europeo Barcelona, and the Eiffel Wooden Construction Award in Germany for the Biodiversum in Remerschen, Luxembourg, as well as being named one of the 100 Architects of the Year by the Korean Institute of Architects. In 2018 he was awarded the Grand Decoration of Merit by the Land of Salzburg.

== Publications ==
=== Books ===
- 1991 Hermann & Valentiny, Karl Krämer, Stuttgart
- 1995 Hermann & Valentiny, Edition Baumeister, Callwey Verlag, München
- 2001 Jetzt | Now, Hermann & Valentiny und Partner, Birkhäuser, Basel–Boston–Berlin
- 2006 Die Geschichte der Salzburger Festspiele von 1894 bis 2006, Wilhelm Holzbauer & François Valentiny, Jung & Jung, Salzburg
- 2008 Codes, Hermann & Valentiny and Partners, Birkhäuser, Basel–Boston–Berlin
- 2010 Luxembourg Expo Pavillon 2010 Shanghai, Hermann & Valentiny and Partners, Jovis, Berlin
- 2011 François Valentiny "De Tao Master of Community Planning and Green Architectural Design", De Tao Masters series books, China development press, Beijing, China

=== Contributions to books ===
- Bauen in Europa – Österreichische Architekten im Europa des 20. Jahrhunderts, Springer Verlag Wien
- New York 1999, Hotel and services centre, Halle, D, Luxembourg Philharmonic building, L, Town council building Bech-Kleinmacher, L
- Häuser am Hang, Callwey Verlag München 2000, House am Seitweg, Klosterneuburg, A
- Winner Wohnbau 1995–2005, Claus Pandi/Holzhauser, 2006 D Variationen Holz, Dworschak, Wenke, Verlag für Bauwesen Berlin Mit zwei Gesichtern, Haus am Seitweg
- Patina – Neue Ästhetik in der zeitgenössischen Architektur, DVA München 2003, Town council building Bech-Kleinmacher, L, house am Seitweg, Klosterneuburg, A
- Concrete Creations, Braun Verlag, Remerschen school centre, L
- Orte – Architektur in Niederösterreich, 1997–2007, Springer Verlag Wien
- New York 2007, House am Seitweg, Klosterneuburg, A

== Image gallery ==
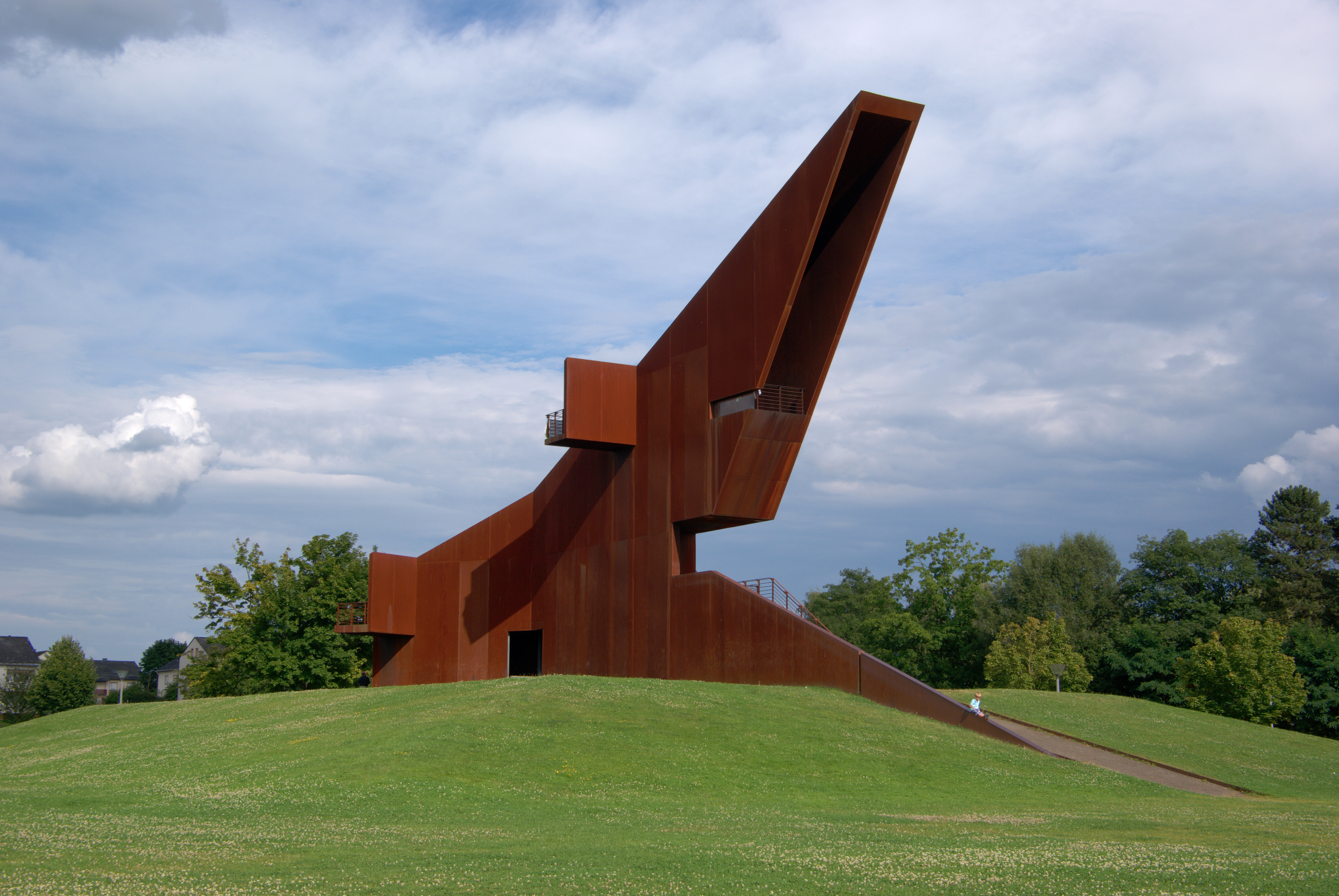
Tower of Dreams and Longings in Trier, Germany

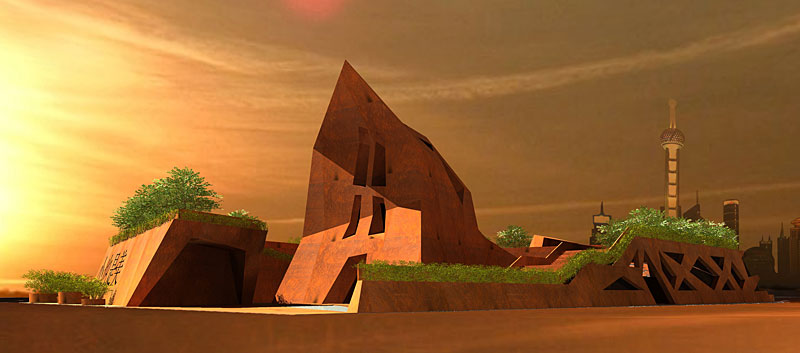
Luxembourg Pavilion for Expo 2010 in Shanghai, China

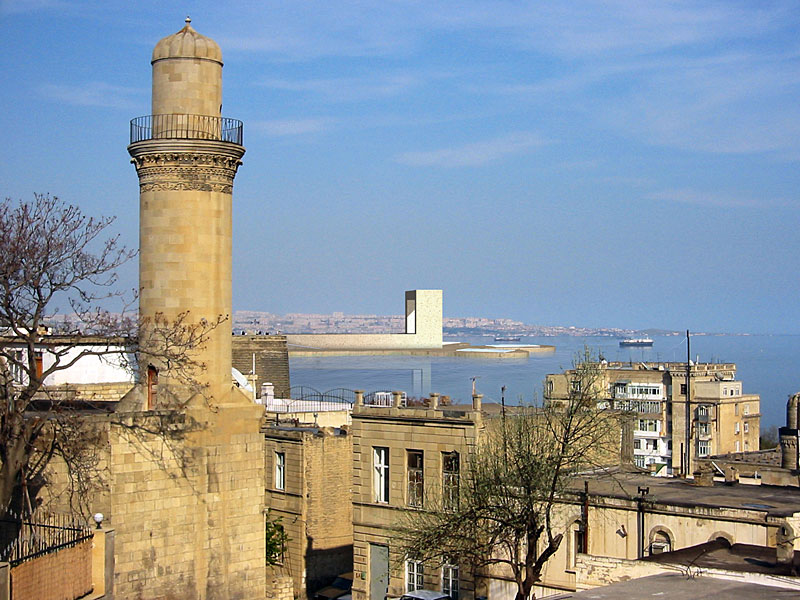
Boulevard in Baku, Azerbaijan

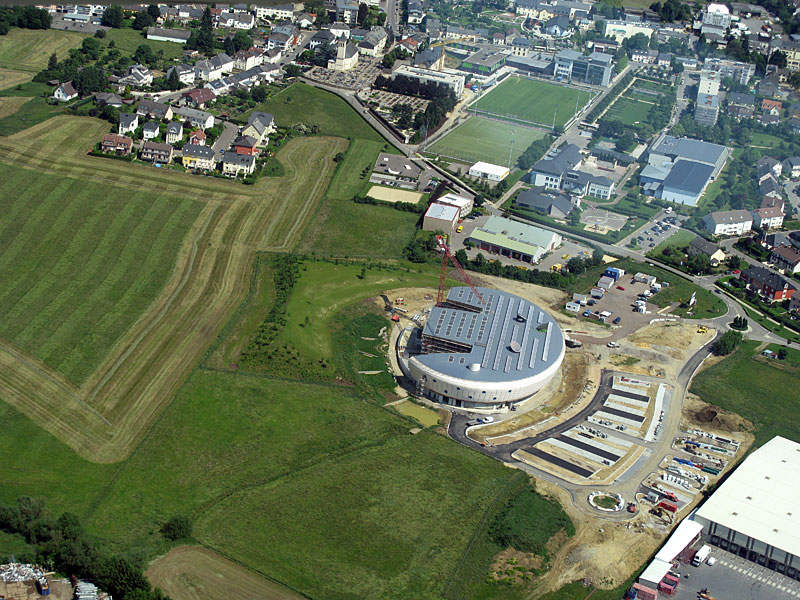
“Les Thermes” Leisure Centre in Strassen-Bertrange, Grand Duchy of Luxembourg

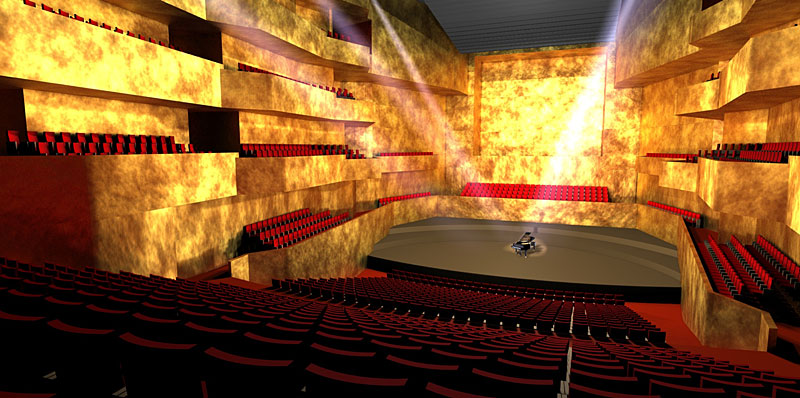
"Wroclaw Concert Hall” in Wroclaw, Poland

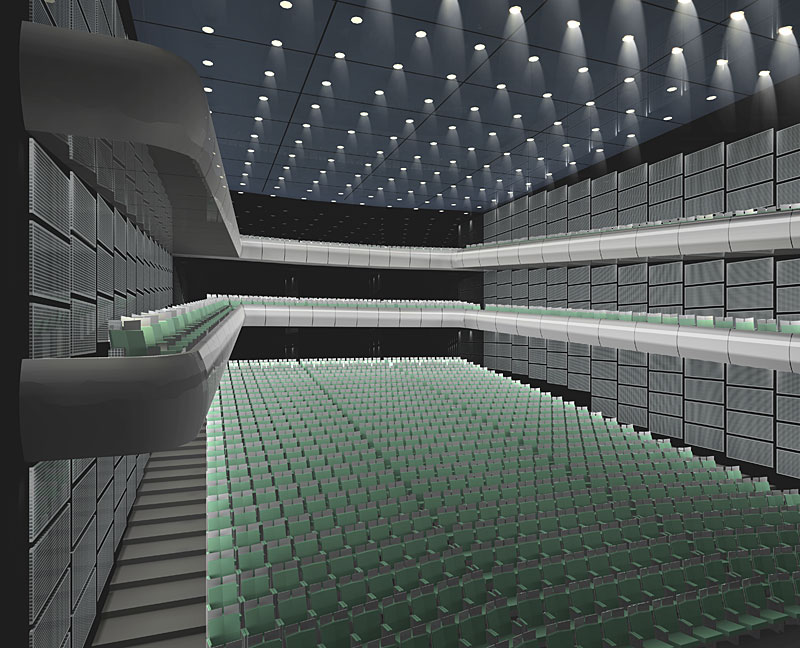
Concert Hall in Stavangerer, Norway

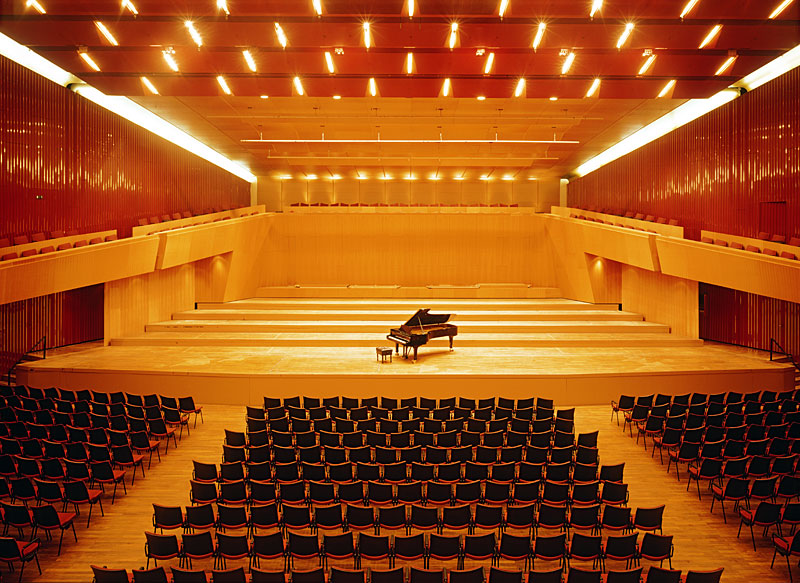
Congresshalle in Saarbrücken, Germany

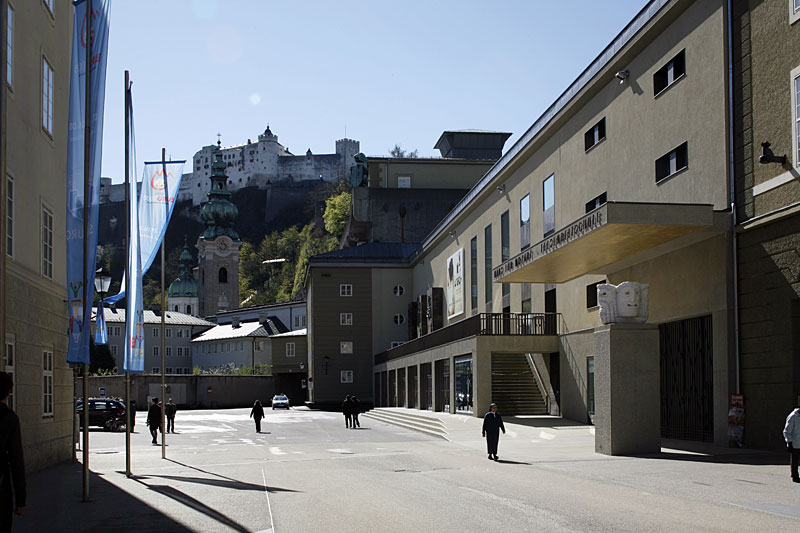
House for Mozart in Salzburg, Austria

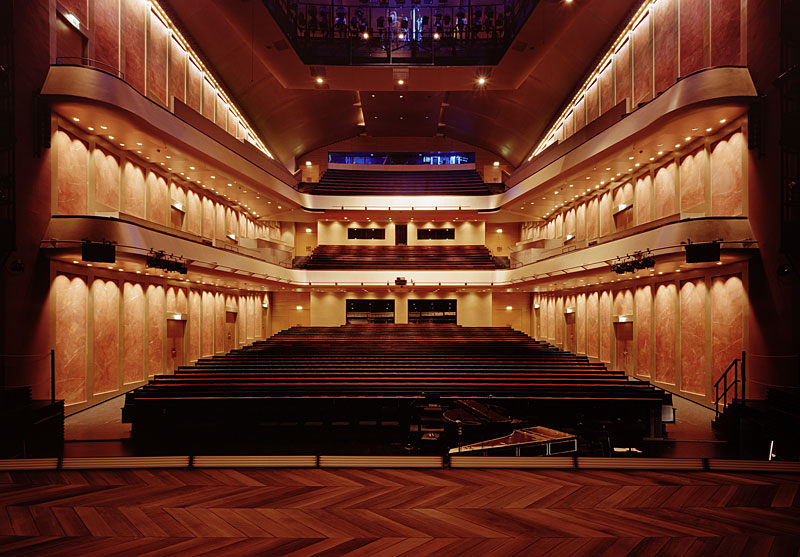
House for Mozart in Salzburg, Austria

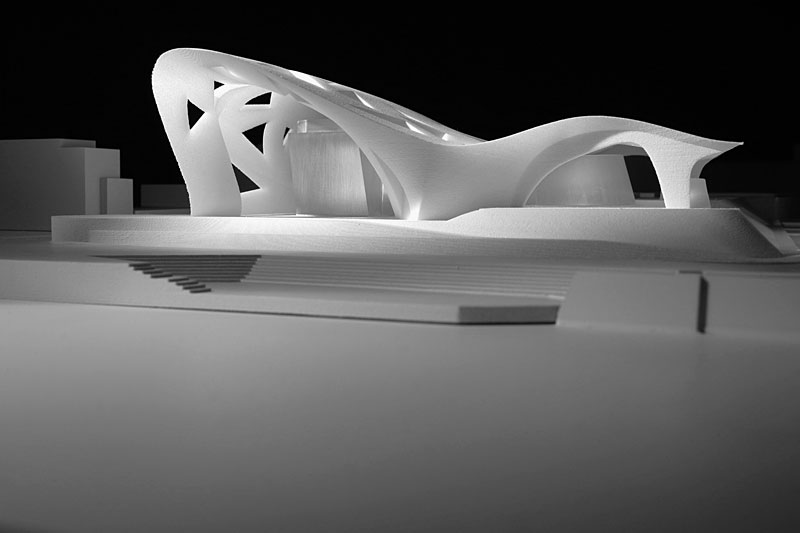
”Beethoven Festspielhaus Bonn” in Bonn, Germany

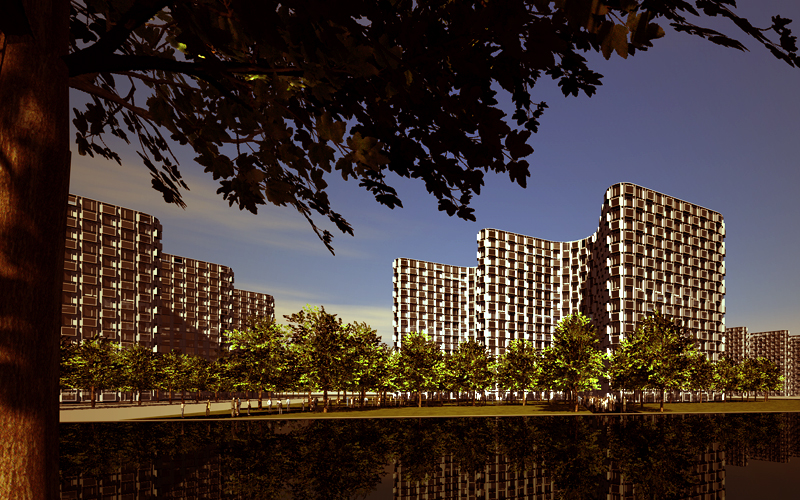
”Basic Housing Project” in Shahe University Town, Beijing

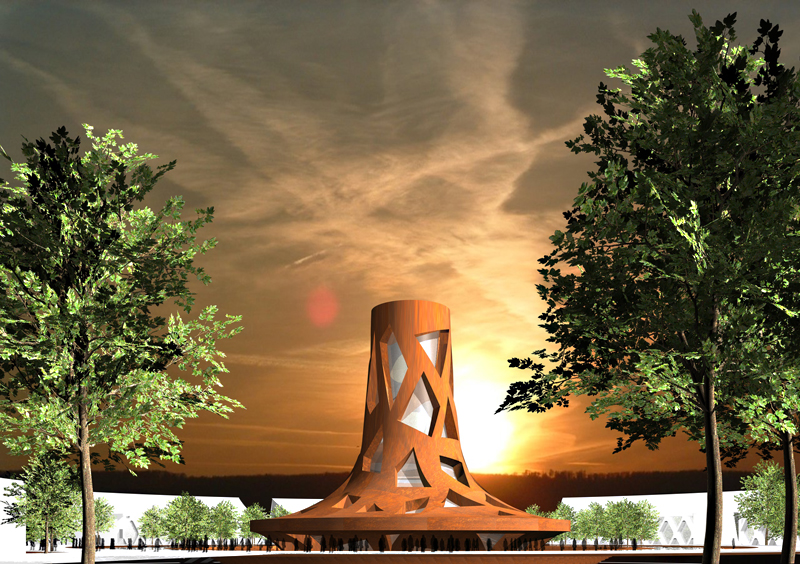
”China_Business Park” in Shanghai-Jiading

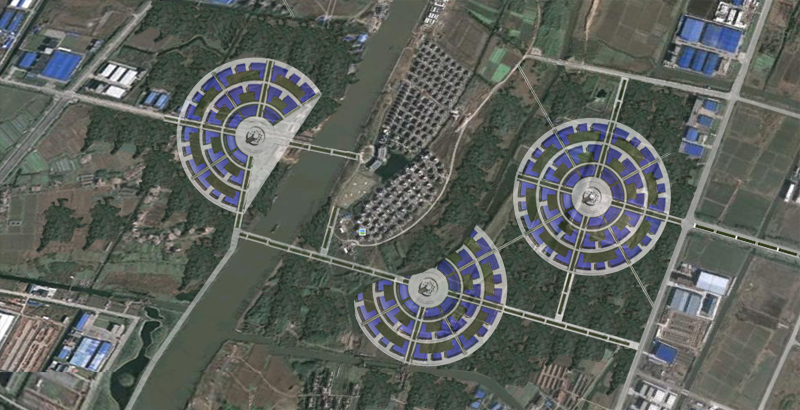
”China_Business Park” in Shanghai-Jiading

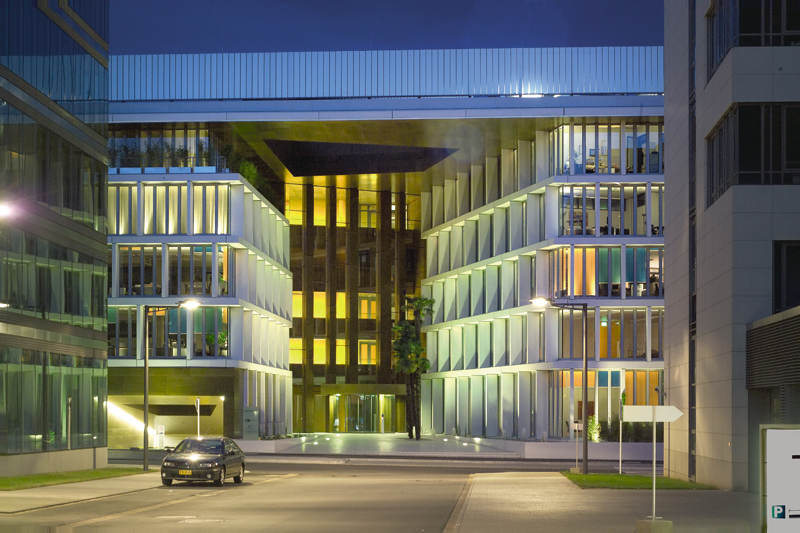
New bank and office building for the Commerzbank in Luxembourg-Kirchberg, Luxembourg

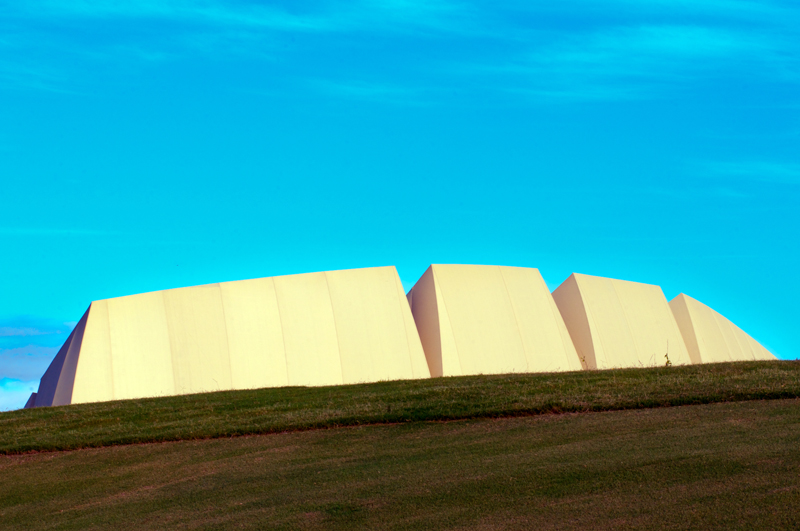
Construction of a new open-air amphitheater « Mozarteum » in Trancoso, Brasil

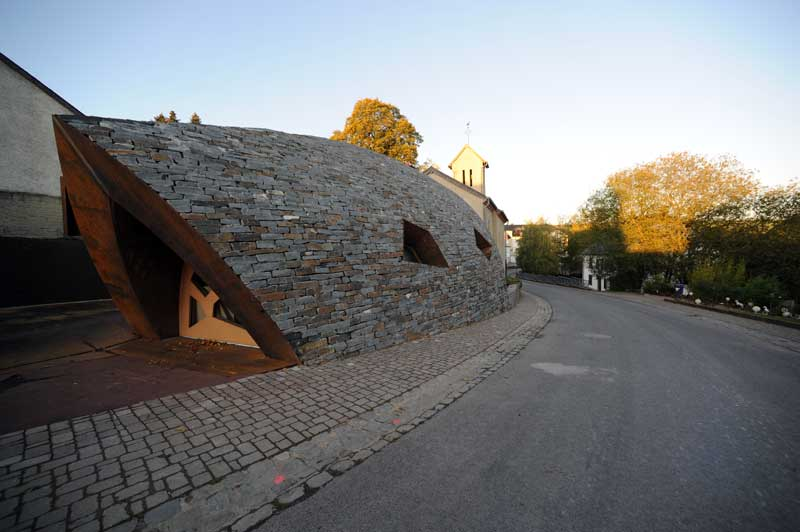
Reconstruction and expansion of the former sacristy of Neunhausen, Luxembourg

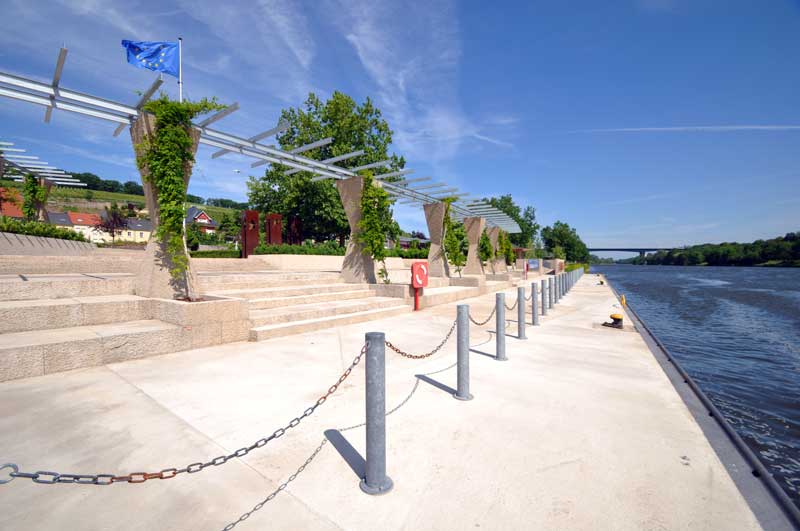
Promenade in Schengen, Luxembourg

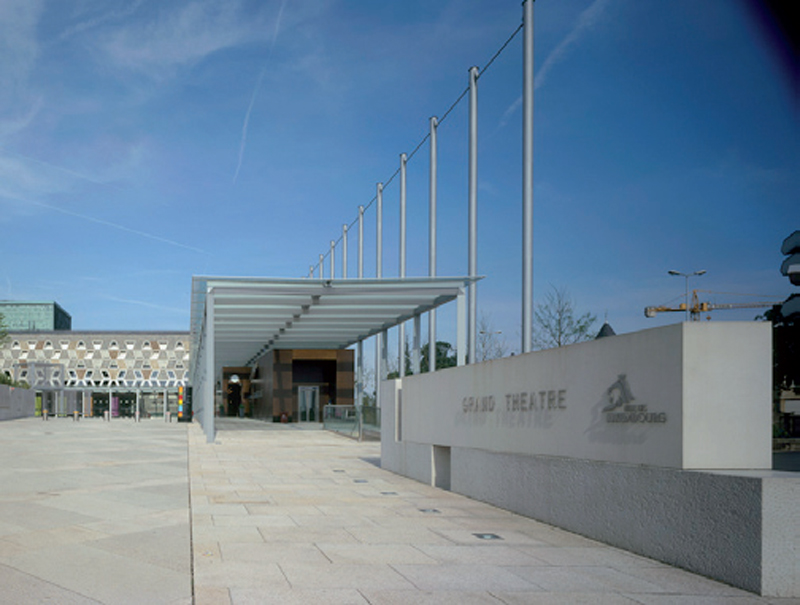
Extension and design of open space, Städtisches Theater in Luxembourg, Luxembourg
