= Schengen, Luxembourg =

Schengen
- Commune
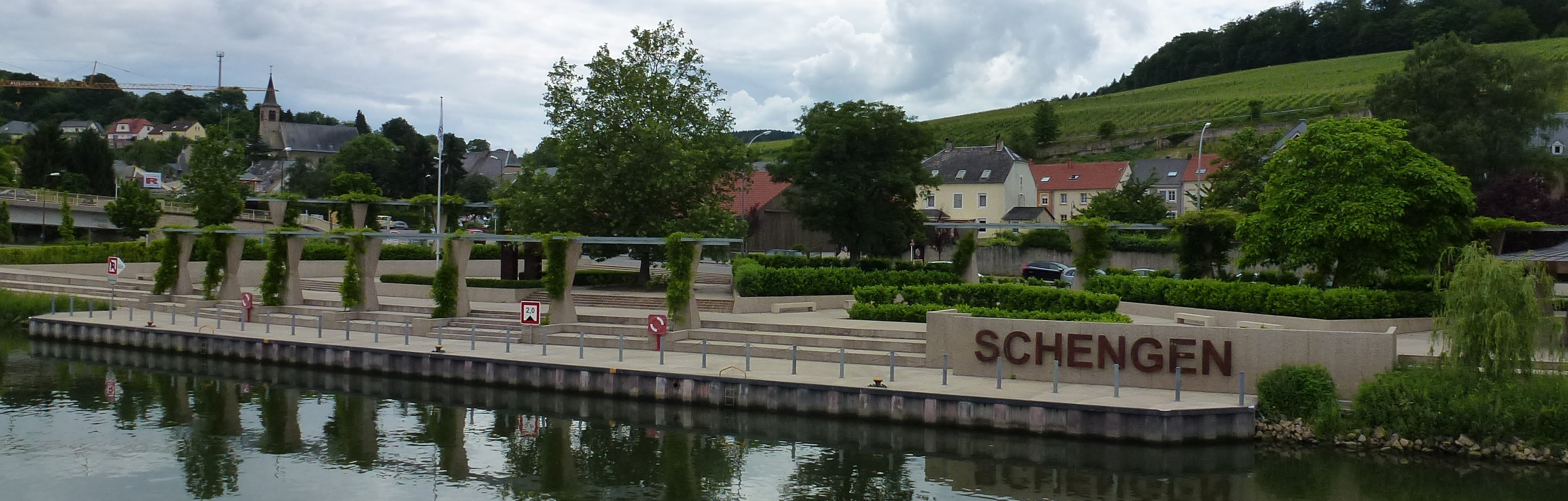
- A view of Schengen

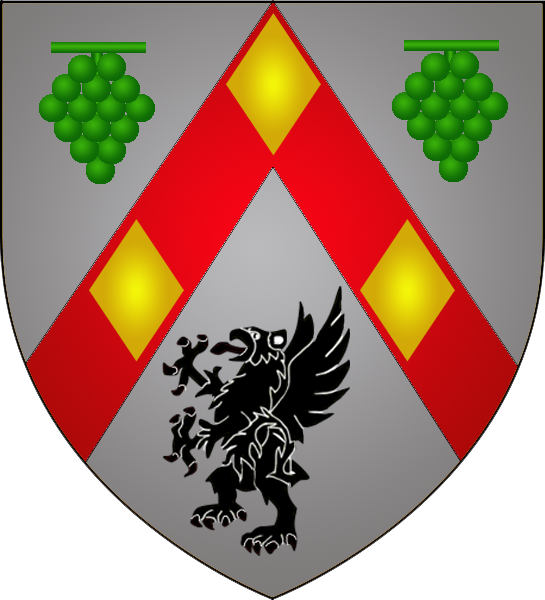
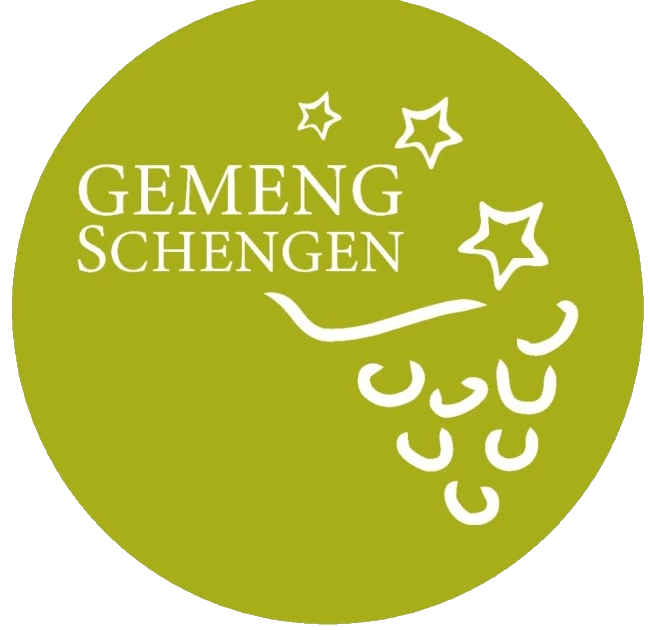
- Coat of arms Brandmark

- Map of Luxembourg with Schengen highlighted in orange, and the canton in dark red

- Schengen Commune's location in EU
- Coordinates: 49°28′10″N 6°21′32″E
- Country: Luxembourg
- Canton: Remich

Government
  - Mayor: Michel Gloden (AE)

Area
  - Total: 31.42 km^{2} (12.13 sq mi)
  - Rank: 24th of 100
- Highest elevation: 302 m (991 ft)
  - Rank: 98th of 100
- Lowest elevation: 141 m (463 ft)
  - Rank: 5th of 100

Population (2026)
  - Total: 5,251
  - Rank: 33rd of 100
  - Density: 167.1/km^{2} (432.8/sq mi)
  - Rank: 49th of 100
- Time zone: UTC+1 (CET)
  - Summer (DST): UTC+2 (CEST)
- LAU 2: LU0001206
- Website: www.schengen.lu

Schengen (Luxembourgish: [ˈʃæŋən], French: [ʃɛŋɡɛn], German: [ˈʃɛŋən]) is a wine-making village and commune in far south-eastern Luxembourg, on the western bank of the river Moselle. The commune border includes the tripoint where the borders of Germany, France, and Luxembourg meet.

After the mergers with Burmerange and Wellenstein in 2011, the commune has a population of 4,224 with an area of 31.42 square kilometres (12.13 sq mi).

The largest settlement within the commune of Schengen is Remerschen after which the commune used to be named. The name of the commune was changed in 2006 to take advantage of Schengen's name recognition after the signing of the Schengen Agreement there in 1985. The town of Schengen itself had a population of 711 as of September 2026.

Schengen Castle dates from 1390 but was almost completely rebuilt in the 19th century.

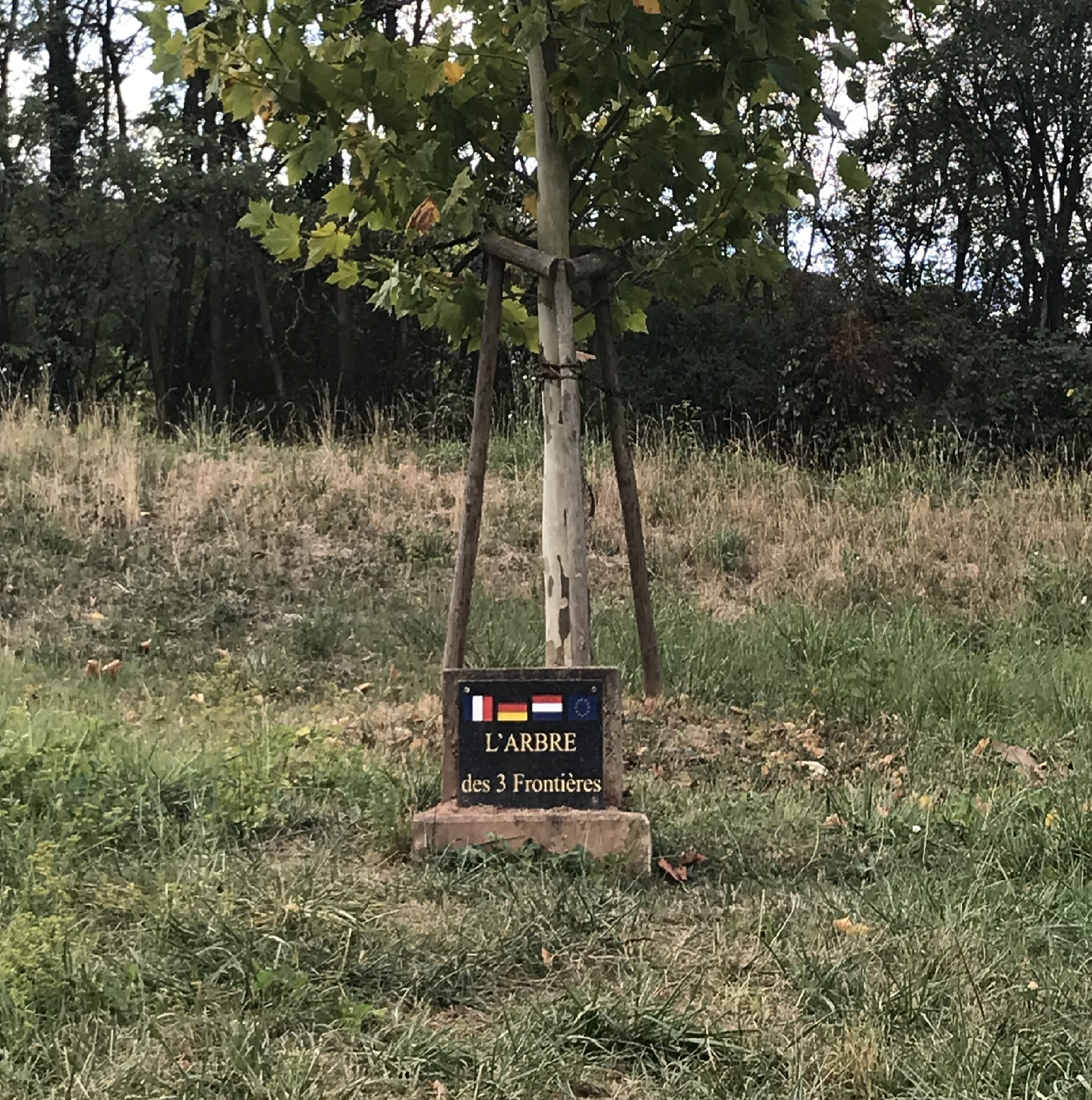
Ceremonial marker near the tri-point of France, Germany and Luxembourg

== Populated places ==
The commune consists of the following villages:

Schengen Section:

- Remerschen
- Schengen
- Wintrange

Burmerange Section:

- Burmerange
- Elvange
- Emerange
- Froumillen
- Weidemillen

Wellenstein Section:

- Bech-Kleinmacher
- Schwebsange
- Wellenstein

== Notable people ==
- Nico Klopp (1894–1930), painter born in Bech-Kleinmacher, painted post-impressionist scenes on the River Moselle where he lived.
- François Valentiny (born 1953 in Remerschen), a Luxembourgish architect.

== Population ==
Historical population

Year	Pop.	±%
1821	3,377	—
1851	3,951	+17.0%
1900	3,228	−18.3%
1910	3,247	+0.6%
1922	3,169	−2.4%
1935	3,083	−2.7%

Year	Pop.	±%
1947	2,909	−5.6%
1960	2,613	−10.2%
1970	2,659	+1.8%
1981	2,602	−2.1%
1990	2,656	+2.1%
2000	3,457	+30.2%

Year	Pop.	±%
2005	3,823	+10.6%
2010	4,100	+7.2%
2015	4,459	+8.8%
2020	4,924	+10.4%
2021	4,956	+0.6%

Source data

== European Museum ==
The European Museum was opened on 13 June 2010, 25 years after the signing of the Schengen Treaty, in the Centre européen building.

The permanent, trilingual exhibition on the history and significance of the Schengen Agreements, on 200 m^{2} (2,200 sq ft) of exhibition space, shows visitors the elimination of the control of persons at the internal borders, put into practice as one of the four foundational European freedoms in the 1957 Treaty of Rome. The signing of the Agreement is documented with historic photos and video and sound footage as well as statements by those involved at the time.

== Twin towns ==
Schengen is twinned with:

- Ischgl, Austria

== See also ==
- Lady of Schengen
