= Schengen Castle =

Castle in Luxembourg

Coordinates: 49°28′16″N 06°21′56″E

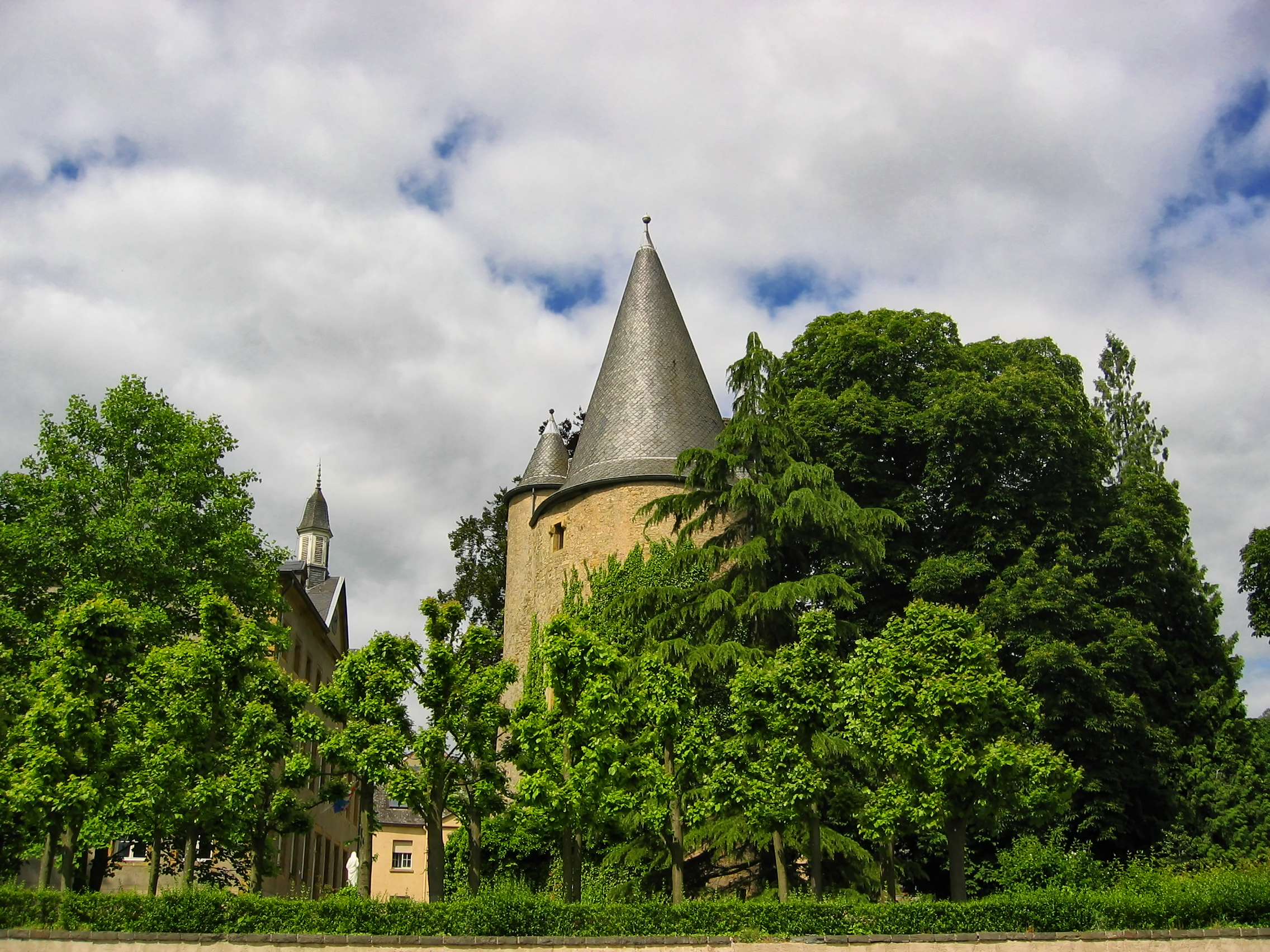
Schengen Castle

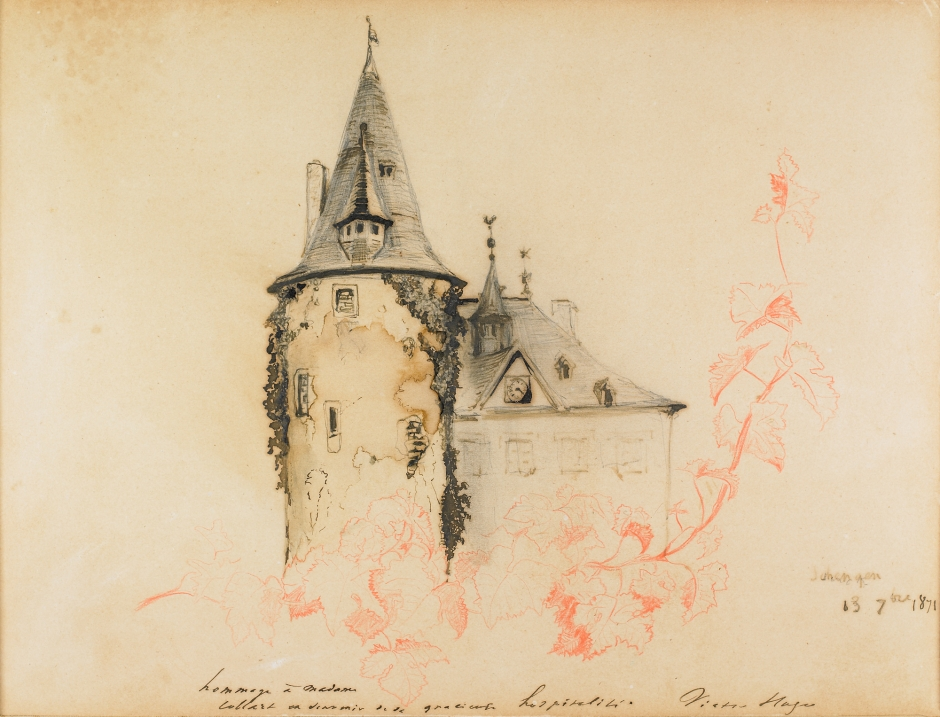
Sketch by Victor Hugo (1871)

Schengen Castle (Luxembourgish: Schlass Schengen; French: Château de Schengen; German: Schloss Schengen) is located in the village of Schengen in the south-east of Luxembourg close to the borders with France and Germany. Dating from 1390 but almost completely rebuilt in the 19th century, it was a hotel and conference centre until it was sold to Regus in 2016.

== History ==
The 14th century fortified castle was torn down by the industrialist Jean-Nicolas Collart in 1812 who built a residential manor house in its place. All that remained of the medieval building was its round central tower. The castle's most famous visitor was Victor Hugo who visited the Collarts in 1871 and made a sketch of the old tower.

== The castle today ==
From 1939, the castle was occupied by the congregation of Saint Elizabeth but in April 2010, it opened as a hotel and conference centre. Together with the surrounding buildings, it has meeting facilities for up to 100 participants. In 2016, the company Regus bought the castle and since then it is unoccupied.
