= Canton of Remich =

Canton of Remich Kanton Réimech (Luxembourgish) Kanton Remich (German) Canton de Remich (French)
- Canton
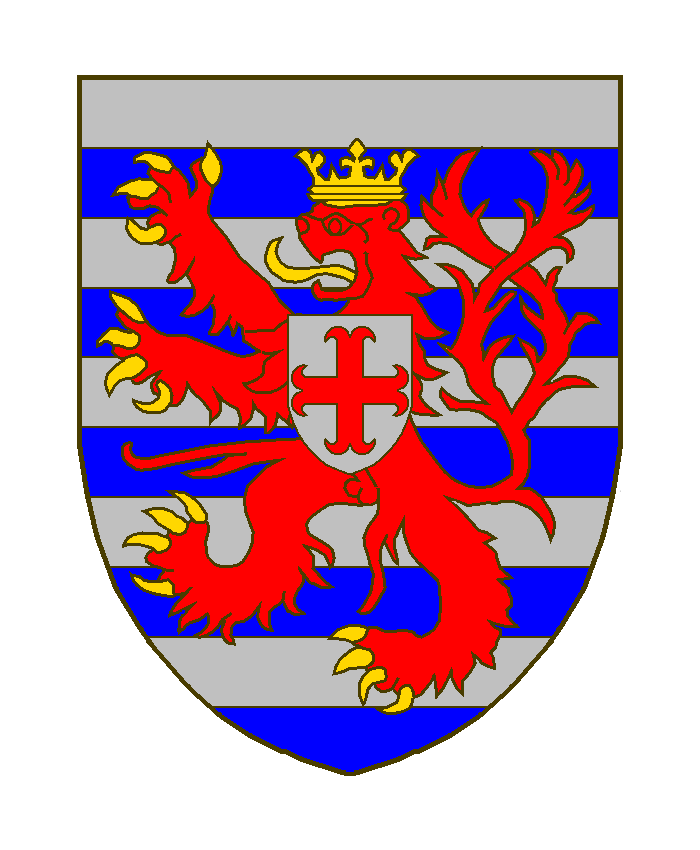
- Coat of arms

- Coordinates: 49°30′N 6°18′E
- Country: Luxembourg
- Legislative constituency: Est
- LAU 1: LU00012
- Communes (cities in bold): Bous-Waldbredimus; Dalheim; Lenningen; Mondorf-les-Bains; Remich; Schengen; Stadtbredimus; Waldbredimus

Area
  - Total: 127.9 km^{2} (49.4 sq mi)
  - Rank: 11th of 12
- Highest elevation (12th of 12): 368 m (1,207 ft)
- Lowest elevation (2nd of 12): 140 m (460 ft)

Population (2026)
  - Total: 24,827
  - Rank: 7th of 12
  - Density: 194.1/km^{2} (502.7/sq mi)
  - Rank: 4th of 12

Remich (Luxembourgish: Réimech) is a canton in the south-east of Luxembourg. It borders Germany & France.

== Administrative divisions ==
The Canton of Remich consists of the following seven communes:

- Bous-Waldbredimus
- Dalheim
- Lenningen
- Mondorf-les-Bains
- Remich
- Schengen
- Stadtbredimus

== Mergers ==
- On 1 January 2012 the former communes of Burmerange and Wellenstein were absorbed into the commune of Schengen. The law expanding Schengen was passed on 30 May 2011.
- On 1 September 2023 the communes of Bous and Waldbredimus merged into Bous-Waldbredimus.

== History ==
The country's subdivision into cantons and administrative communes dates from the decree of the Committee of Public Safety (the French Revolutionary government) of 31 August 1795, barely three months after French forces had taken the Fortress of Luxembourg.

At the time, Luxembourg still had its historical borders and comprised a larger territory, before the later Partitions. In other words, the Moselle River did not constitute the border at the time, and the Canton of Remich's territory included places such as Palzem, Kreuzweiler, Wies, Nennig, Besch, Wochern, and Borg, all located on the far side of the Moselle in what is now Germany.

At the time of the Revolution, the commune of Remich had a population of 1110. As the administrative centre of the canton, Remich was the location of a justice of the peace, and in 1822 was awarded the status of "town" by government decree.

According to the census of 1796, after Remich itself the next most populous places of the canton were Dalheim (477 inhabitants), Wormeldange (436), which was later transferred to the canton of Grevenmacher, Wellenstein (419), and Mondorf (414).

After Napoleon's defeat, in 1815 the Congress of Vienna made the Moselle into the eastern border of Luxembourg towards the Rhineland, which was now Rhenish Prussia. The canton of Remich therefore lost its lands on the right bank of the Moselle.

Under the French administration, the Remich canton had been part of the arrondissement of Luxembourg. Later, Luxembourg was de facto annexed to the Kingdom of the Netherlands, which brought about changes to the administrative subdivisions by decrees in 1822 and 1823. Arrondissements were re-named districts, and their number increased from 4 to 8. These included the new district of Grevenmacher, to which belonged the cantons of Grevenmacher, Echternach, Betzdorf, and Remich.

At the beginning of the 19th century, the canton of Remich — mostly agricultural in nature — primarily lived off vine-growing and cultivating fruit trees. In terms of industries, Remich was the location of various quarries, lime kilns, a tile factory and a brickworks. A factory making artistic products out of gypsum was founded in 1827, but was not able to survive. Along with a brewery and a tannery in Mondorf, and a dyery and a snuffbox manufacturer in Dalheim, these were all the industries in the canton.

The wine industry had serious difficulties under the Dutch regime, due to a poorly conceived consumption tax on wine. It was this tax that provoked unrest in Remich in 1823. 14 gendarmes were assaulted by the inhabitants "with a violence that could be compared to the fury of a tiger", according to an official report. The authorities had to send infantry and cavalry. From this day, there was a rift between the people (except for a handful of notables, who were large-scale property owners) and the Dutch regime.

Ironically, at the time of the Belgian Revolution in 1830, the canton was sometimes called the "Dutch canton". This term came from the fact that several prominent members of the Orangist cause came from the canton. The wider population, on the other hand, were on the side of the Belgian revolutionaries. When the Revolution broke out in October 1830, the tax agents in Remich only remained unharmed thanks to the intervention of the mayor, Jacques D'Martigny.

After the third partition of Luxembourg in 1839, where much of its territory was ceded to Belgium, a decree from 12 October 1841 by the King-Grand Duke William II reorganised government districts, cantons and communes, creating the state of affairs that largely remained unchanged to the present day, save for some minor modifications. Since then, the canton of Remich has comprised the same communes that it still does, Lenningen, Stadtbredimus, Bous, Waldbredimus, Remich, Wellenstein, Remerschen, Burmerange, Dalheim, and Mondorf. It formerly also included Weiler-la-Tour, but in 1846 this was transferred to the canton of Luxembourg, following the wishes of the commune's inhabitants.

The Moselle region experienced several years of suffering in the following period, after multiple consecutive bad harvests. In 1854 for example, the grape harvest was not even a tenth of a normal year's harvest. In desperation, many winegrowers and day labourers chose emigration en masse, in families and groups of families from the same village, towards the United States.

It is likely that Remich's expansion around the middle of the 19th century was due to its importance as a river port before the construction of the railways. The latter started in 1859 with the construction of the Luxembourg-Thionville line. The network's framework was completed by 1867 with the building of the Ettelbruck-Troisvierges line.

Before then, river traffic on the Moselle had been significant, helped by exports of cast iron and ore headed for the Rhine and Saar rivers. In the canton of Remich, this movement of goods flowed mostly via the river port of Stadtbredimus.

In 1872, the residents of Bech, Kleinmacher, and Schwebsange, petitioned the Chamber of Deputies to separate them from the commune of Wellenstein. The dispute dragged on for a long time. Finally, at a session of the Chamber on 20 December 1878, it was established that tensions had died down. This was because the post of mayor, which had been filled by a Wellenstein resident for 18 years, was recently awarded to someone from a different part of the commune. In the end, the communal council unanimously decided to withdraw its petition of 1872.

== Population ==
Historical population

Year	Pop.	±%
1821	11,229	—
1851	14,913	+32.8%
1900	12,187	−18.3%
1910	11,857	−2.7%
1922	11,360	−4.2%
1935	11,001	−3.2%

Year	Pop.	±%
1947	10,587	−3.8%
1960	10,023	−5.3%
1970	10,627	+6.0%
1981	11,794	+11.0%
1990	12,734	+8.0%
2000	16,025	+25.8%

Year	Pop.	±%
2005	17,363	+8.3%
2010	19,232	+10.8%
2015	20,520	+6.7%
2020	23,244	+13.3%
2021	23,529	+1.2%

Source data
