= Schengen Agreement =

European Union treaty on internal border controls

Agreement between the Governments of the States of the Benelux Economic Union, the Federal Republic of Germany and the French Republic on the gradual abolition of checks at their common borders
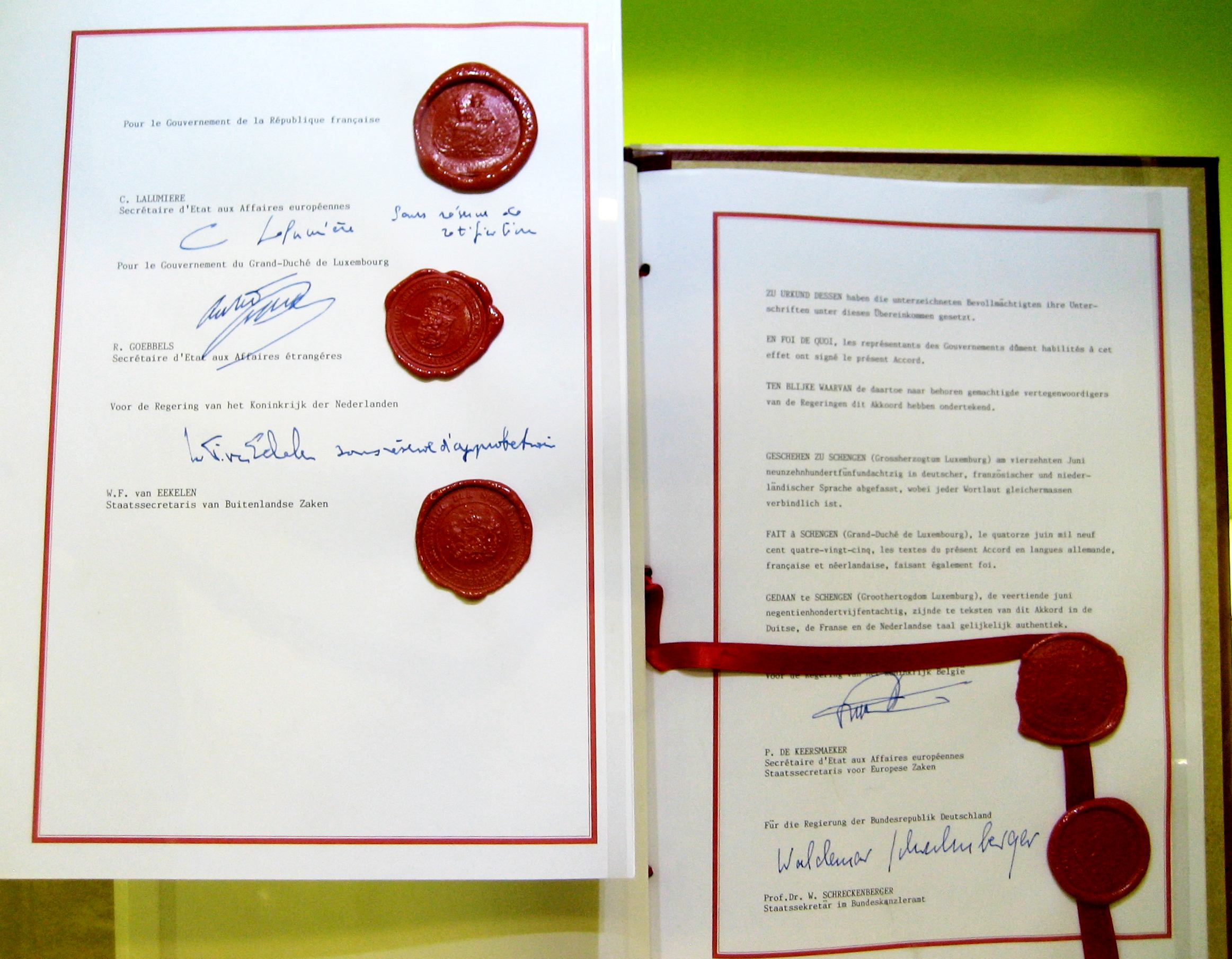
- Signatures of the Schengen Agreement on 14 June 1985
- Signed: 14 June 1985 (41 years, 2 months and 4 days ago)
- Location: Schengen, Luxembourg
- Effective: 26 March 1995 (31 years, 4 months and 23 days ago)
- Original signatories: Belgium; France; West Germany; Luxembourg; Netherlands
- Parties: Austria; Belgium; Bulgaria; Croatia; Czech Republic; Denmark; Estonia; Finland; France; Germany; Greece; Hungary; Iceland (Note: Not an EU member); Italy; Latvia; Liechtenstein; Lithuania; Luxembourg; Malta; Netherlands; Norway; Poland; Portugal; Romania; Slovakia; Slovenia; Spain; Sweden; Switzerland
- Depositary: Government of the Grand Duchy of Luxembourg

Full text
- Convention implementing the Schengen Agreement at Wikisource

The Schengen Agreement (English: /ˈʃɛŋən/ SHENG-ən, Luxembourgish: [ˈʃæŋən]) is a treaty which led to the creation of Europe's Schengen Area, in which internal border checks have largely been abolished. It was signed on 14 June 1985, near the town of Schengen, Luxembourg, by five of the ten member states of the then European Economic Community. It proposed measures intended to gradually abolish border checks at the signatories' common borders, including reduced-speed vehicle checks which allowed vehicles to cross borders without stopping, allowing residents in border areas freedom to cross borders away from fixed checkpoints, and the harmonisation of visa policies.

In 1990, the Agreement was supplemented by the Schengen Convention which proposed the complete abolition of systematic internal border controls and a common visa policy. The Schengen Area operates very much like a single state for international travel purposes with external border controls for travellers entering and exiting the area, and common visas, but with no internal border controls. It currently consists of 29 European countries covering a population of over 450 million people and an area of 4,595,131 square kilometres (1,774,190 sq mi).

Originally, the Schengen treaties and the rules adopted under them operated independently from the European Union. However, in 1999 they were incorporated into European Union law by the Amsterdam Treaty, while providing opt-outs for the only two EU member states that had remained outside the Area: Ireland and the United Kingdom (the latter of which subsequently withdrew from the EU in 2020). Schengen is now a core part of EU law, and all EU member states without an opt-out which have not already joined the Schengen Area are legally obliged to do so when technical requirements have been met. Several non-EU countries are included in the area through special association agreements.

== History ==
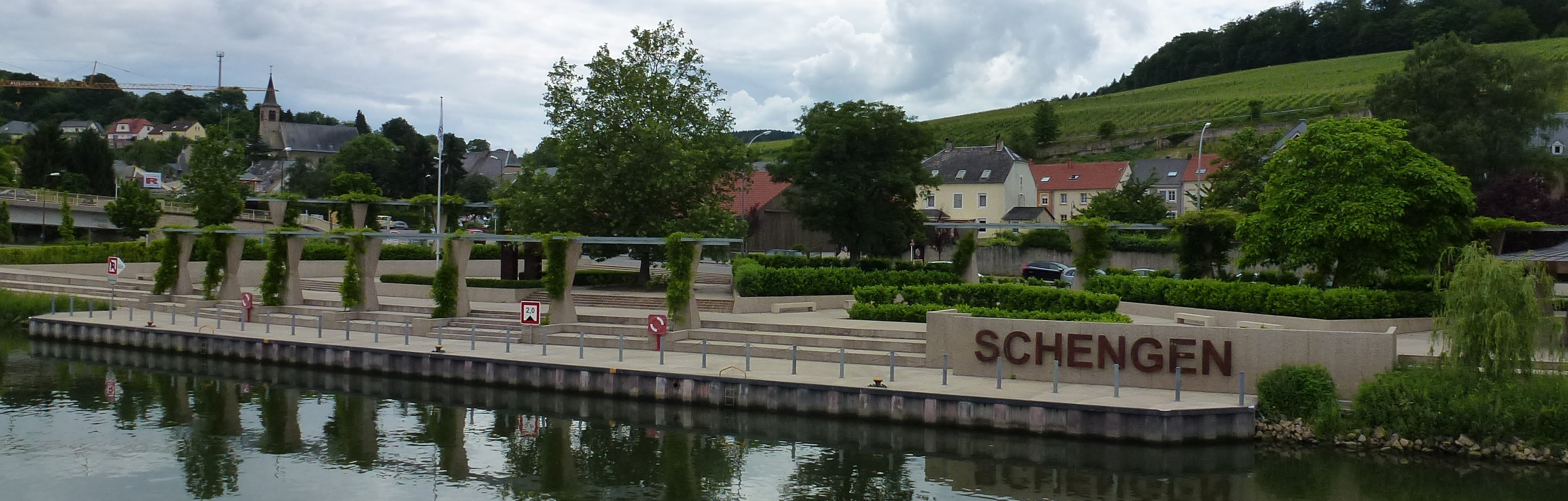
Schengen, border town in Luxembourg where the agreement was signed

Free movement of people was a core part of the original Treaty of Rome and, from the early days of the European Economic Community, nationals of EEC member states could travel freely from one member state to another on production of their passports or national identity cards. However, systematic identity controls were still in place at the border between most member states.

Disagreement between member states led to an impasse on the abolition of border controls within the Community, but in 1985 five of the then ten member states – Belgium, France, Luxembourg, the Netherlands, and West Germany – signed an agreement on the gradual abolition of common border controls. The agreement was signed aboard the MS Princesse Marie-Astrid on the river Moselle near the town of Schengen, Luxembourg, at the tripoint between France, Germany and Luxembourg. Three of the signatories, Belgium, Luxembourg, and the Netherlands, had already abolished common border controls in 1970 as part of the Benelux Economic Union.

EU member states participating EU member state not participating but obliged to join EU member state with an opt-out non-EU member states participating non-EU member states de facto participating non-EU member states with an open border

The Schengen Agreement was signed independently of the European Union, in part owing to the lack of consensus amongst EU member states over whether or not the EU had the jurisdiction to abolish border controls, and in part because those ready to implement the idea did not wish to wait for others (at this time there was no enhanced co-operation mechanism). The Agreement provided for harmonisation of visa policies, allowing residents in border areas the freedom to cross borders away from fixed checkpoints, the replacement of passport checks with visual surveillance of vehicles at reduced speed, and vehicle checks that allowed vehicles to cross borders without stopping.

In 1990, the Agreement was supplemented by the Schengen Convention which proposed the abolition of internal border controls and a common visa policy. It was this Convention that created the Schengen Area through the complete abolition of border controls between Schengen member states, common rules on visas, and police and judicial cooperation.

The Schengen Agreement and its implementing Convention were enacted in 1995 only for some signatories, but just over two years later during the Amsterdam Intergovernmental Conference, all European Union member states except the United Kingdom and Ireland had signed the Agreement. It was during those negotiations, which led to the Amsterdam Treaty, that the incorporation of the Schengen acquis into the main body of European Union law was agreed along with opt-outs for Ireland and the United Kingdom (which subsequently withdrew from the EU in 2020), which were to remain outside of the Schengen Area.

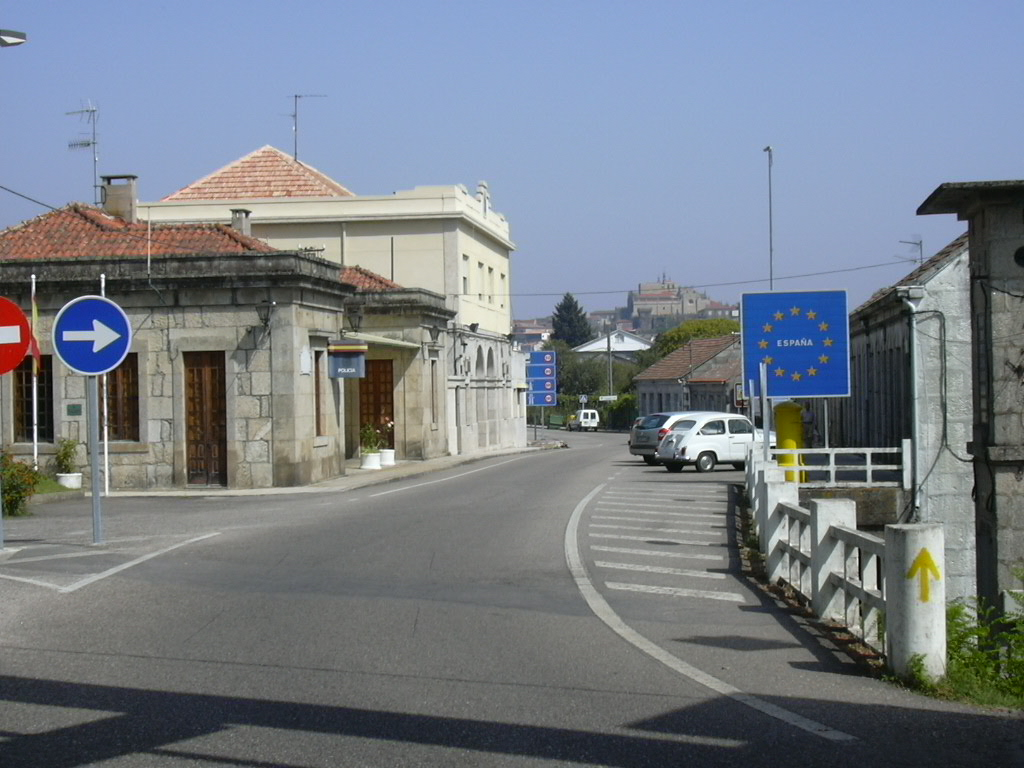
A simple sign marks the Schengen border between Spain and Portugal.

In December 1996, two non-EU member states, Norway and Iceland, signed an association agreement with the signatories of the Agreement to become part of the Schengen Area. While this agreement never came into force, both countries did become part of the Schengen Area after concluding similar agreements with the EU. The Schengen Convention itself was not open for signature by non-EU member states. In 2009, Switzerland finalised its official entry to the Schengen Area with the acceptance of an association agreement by popular referendum in 2005.

Now that the Schengen Agreement is part of the acquis communautaire, it has, for EU members, lost the status of a treaty, which could only be amended according to its terms. Instead, amendments are made according to the legislative procedure of the EU under EU treaties. Ratification by the former agreement signatory states is not required for altering or repealing some or all of the former Schengen acquis. New EU member states are bound to implement the Schengen rules as part of the pre-existing body of EU law, which every new entrant is required to accept as part of their treaty of accession.

This situation means that non-EU Schengen member states have few formally binding options to influence the shaping and evolution of Schengen rules; their options are effectively reduced to agreeing or withdrawing from the agreement. However, consultations with affected countries are conducted prior to the adoption of particular new legislation.

In 2016, border controls were temporarily reintroduced in seven Schengen countries (Austria, Denmark, France, Germany, Norway, Poland, and Sweden) in response to the European migrant crisis.

Portugal reintroduced checks several times along its border with Spain, during the UEFA Euro 2004 championships and when Portugal hosted the NATO 2010 Lisbon summit. Portugal also reintroduced border checks from 10 May 2017 to 14 May 2017, during Pope Francis's visit to Fátima, Portugal.

Border controls were reintroduced throughout the area during the COVID-19 pandemic.

On 8 December 2022, the Justice and Home Affairs Council voted to admit Croatia to the Schengen Area, effective from 1 January 2023.

On 30 December 2023, the Justice and Home Affairs Council agreed to partially include Bulgaria and Romania in the Schengen Area, with air and maritime border checks lifted from 31 March 2024. On 12 December 2024, the Council decided to lift the remaining border checks at land crossing effective 1 January 2025, making Bulgaria and Romania full members of the Schengen Area.

The European Union started the progressive implementation of the Entry/Exit System (EES) on 12 October 2025, and since 10 April 2026, the system has been fully operational and is in use at all external border crossings of the Schengen Area. This system aims to enhance border security by electronically registering the entry and exit data of non-EU nationals crossing the external borders of Schengen member states. The EES replaced the manual stamping of passports, streamlining border crossings and improving the detection of over-stayers.

== See also ==
- Central America-4 Border Control Agreement
- eu-LISA
- European Neighbourhood Policy
- Internal market
- Prüm Convention
