= Elvange, Moselle =

Elvange
- Commune
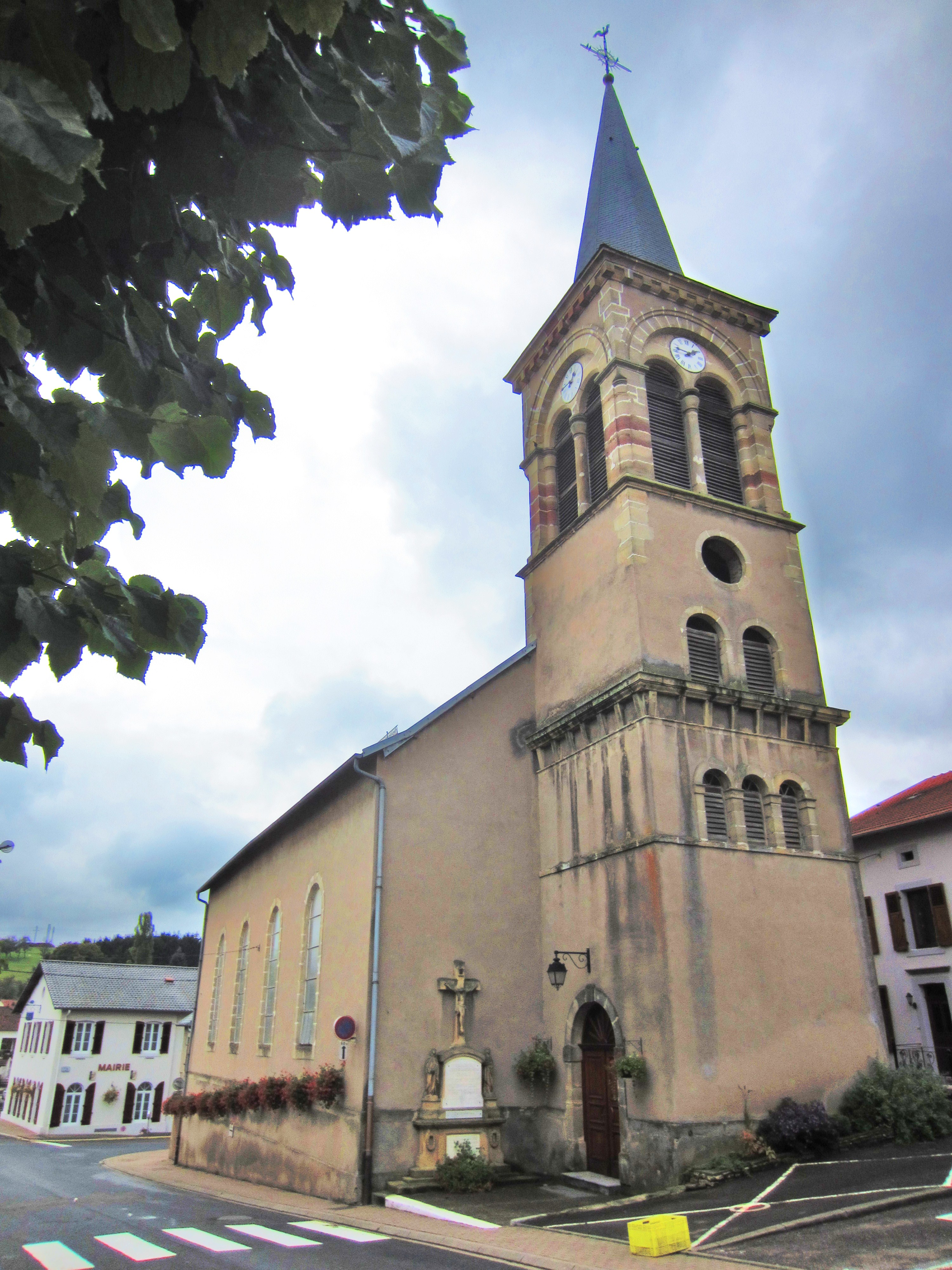
- The church in Elvange

- Coat of arms
- Location of Elvange
- Location within France Location within Grand Est
- Coordinates: 49°03′39″N 6°32′59″E
- Country: France
- Region: Grand Est
- Department: Moselle
- Arrondissement: Forbach-Boulay-Moselle
- Canton: Faulquemont
- Intercommunality: CC du District Urbain de Faulquemont

Government
  - Mayor (2020–2026): Jean-Michel Simon
- Area^{1}: 7.12 km^{2} (2.75 sq mi)
- Elevation: 233 m (764 ft)
- Highest elevation: 305 m (1,001 ft)
- Lowest elevation: 227 m (745 ft)
- Population (2023): 419
  - Density: 58.8/km^{2} (152/sq mi)
- Time zone: UTC+01:00 (CET)
  - Summer (DST): UTC+02:00 (CEST)
- INSEE/Postal code: 57190 /57690
- ^{1} French Land Register data, which excludes lakes, ponds, glaciers > 1 km^{2} (0.386 sq mi or 247 acres) and river estuaries.

Elvange (French pronunciation: [ɛlvɑ̃ʒ]; Lorraine Franconian Ilwingen; German: Elwingen) is a commune in the Moselle department in Grand Est in north-eastern France.

== See also ==
- Communes of the Moselle department
