= Burmerange =

Burmerange Boermereng
- Former commune
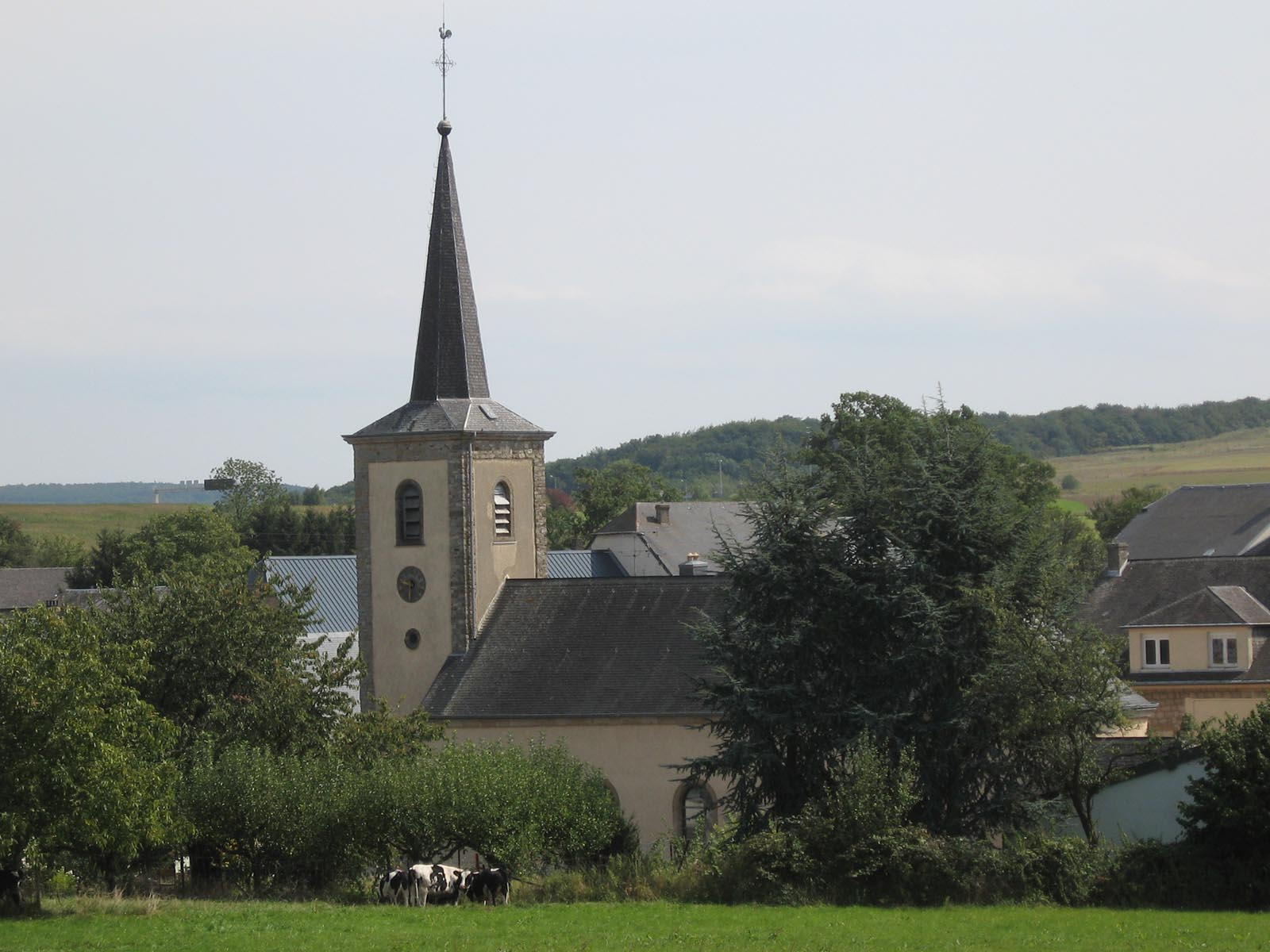
- Burmerange church

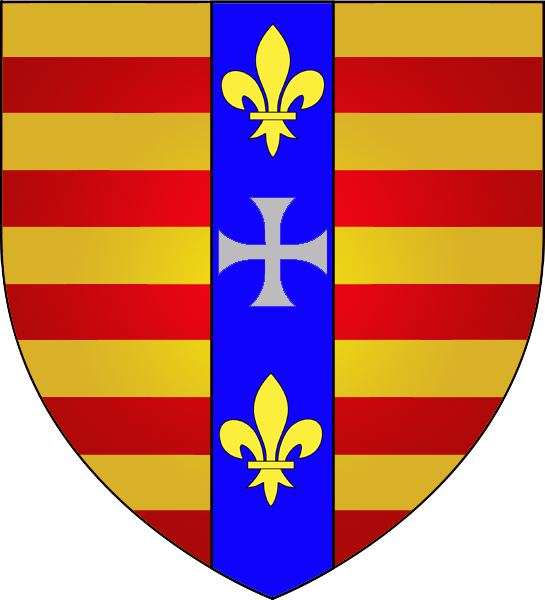
- Coat of arms

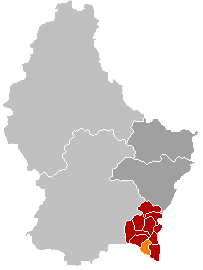
- Map of Luxembourg with Burmerange highlighted in orange, and the canton in dark red
- Coordinates: 49.4847°N 6.3222°E
- Country: Luxembourg
- Canton: Remich
- commune: Schengen
- Time zone: UTC+1 (CET)
  - Summer (DST): UTC+2 (CEST)
- Website: burmerange.lu

Burmerange (French pronunciation: [byʁməʁɑ̃ʒ]; Luxembourgish: Boermereng; German: Bürmeringen [ˈbʏʁməʁɪŋən]) is a village in the canton of Remich, in south-eastern Luxembourg.

It used to be a commune until it was merged into Schengen (along with Wellenstein) in 2011.

As of September 2026, the village of Burmerange, which lies in the south-east of the commune, had a population of 303.

== Former commune ==
The former commune consisted of the villages:

- Burmerange
- Elvange
- Emerange
- Froumillen
- Weidemillen
