= Elvange, Luxembourg =

Town in the commune of Schengen, Luxembourg

Coordinates: 49.5053°N 6.3160°E

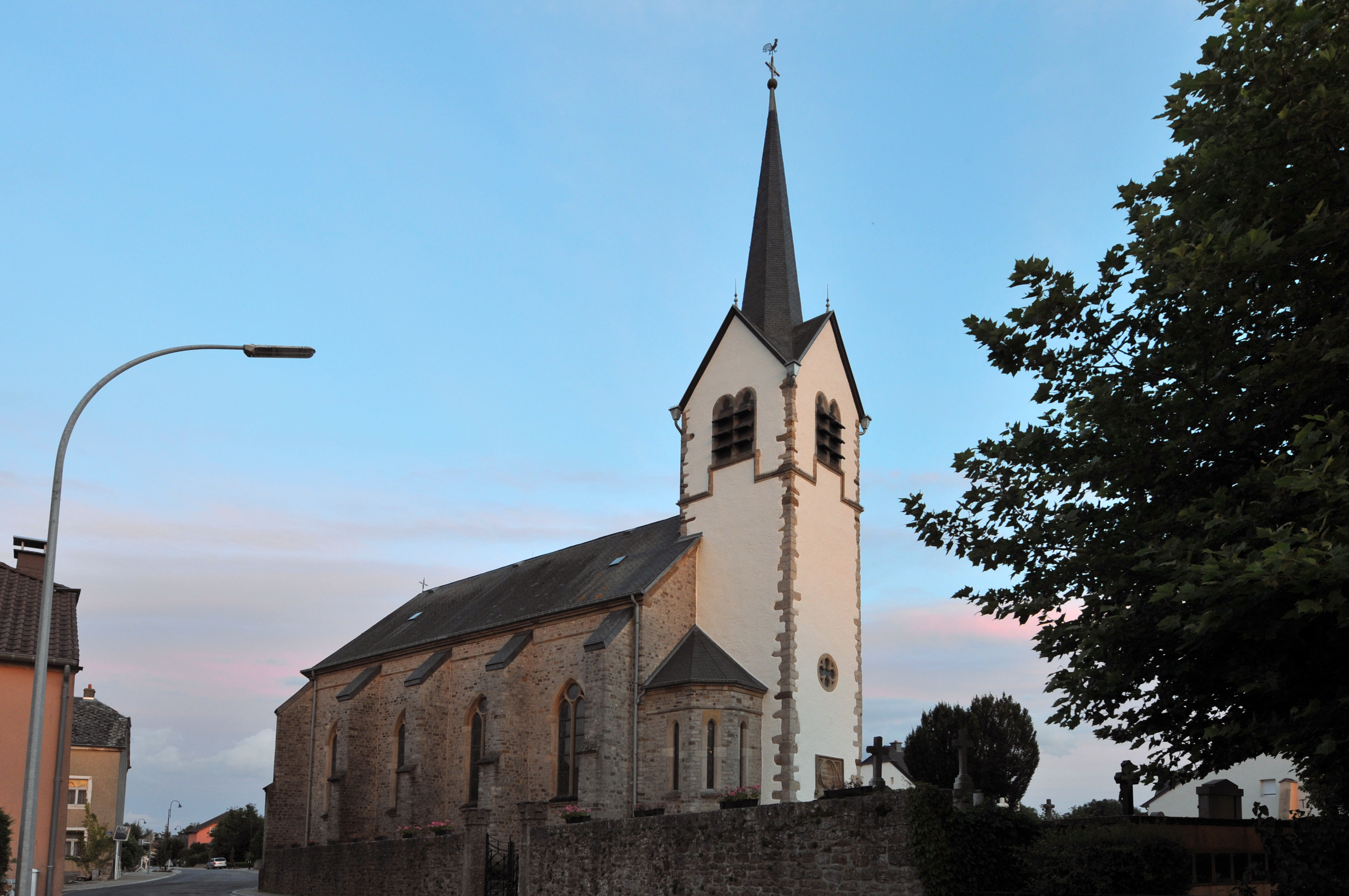
Parish church in Elvange

Elvange (French pronunciation: [ɛlvɑ̃ʒ]; Luxembourgish: Elveng, German: Elvingen) is a small town in the commune of Schengen, in south-eastern Luxembourg. As of September 2026, the town has a population of 1,026.
