= Lenningen, Luxembourg =

Lenningen Lenneng
- Commune
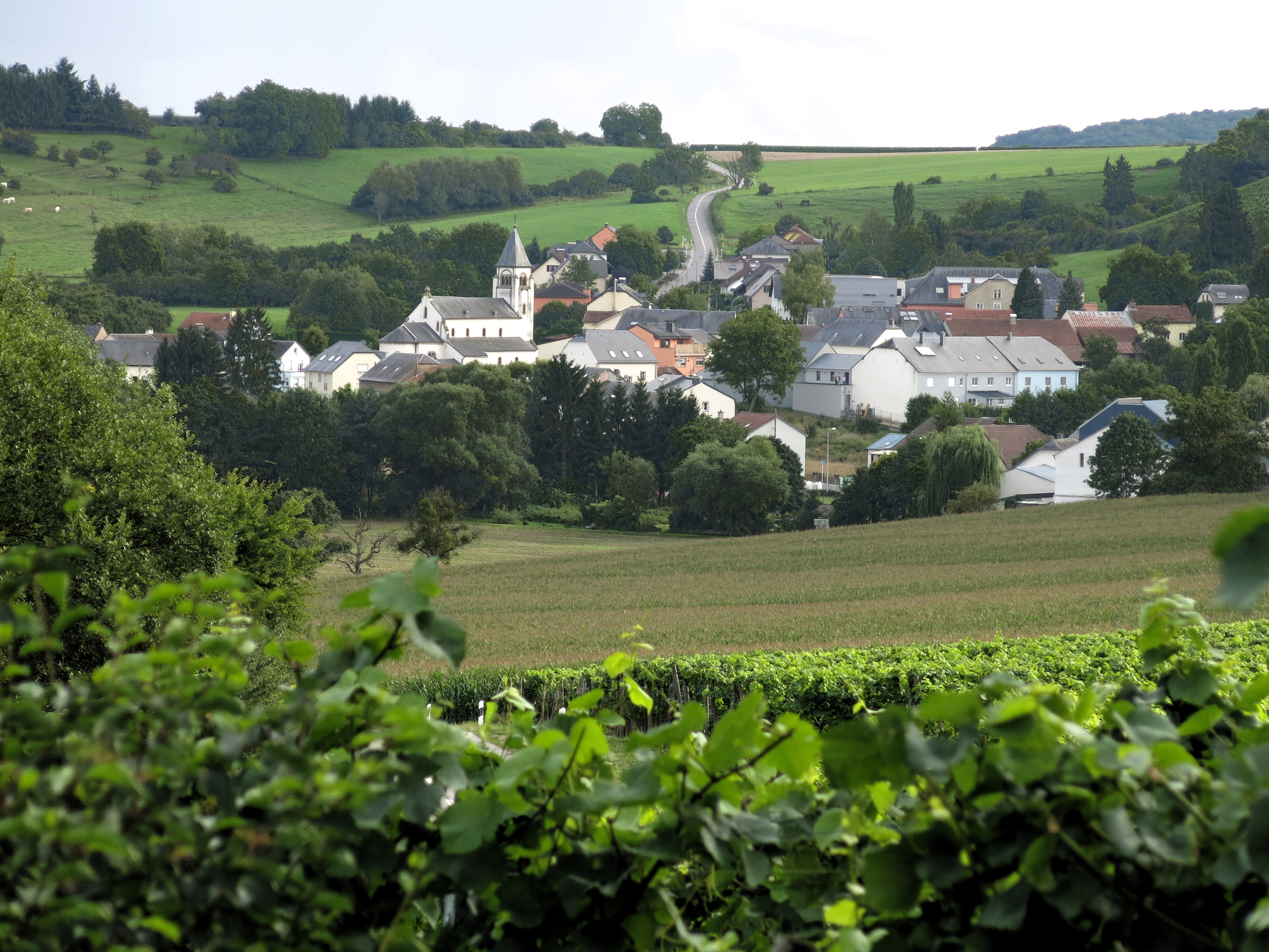

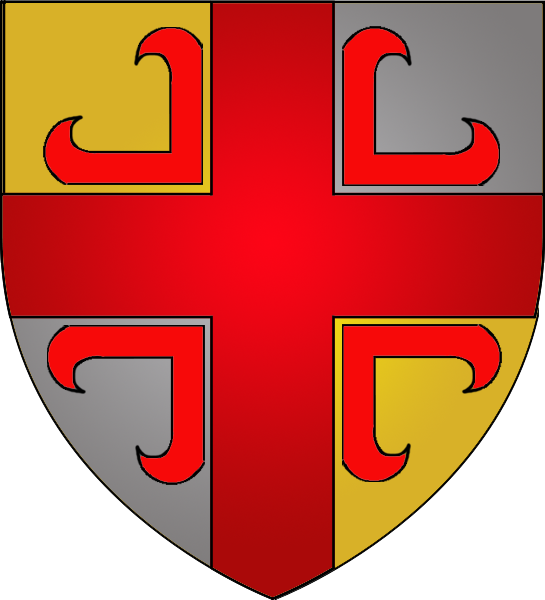
- Coat of arms

- Map of Luxembourg with Lenningen highlighted in orange, and the canton in dark red
- Coordinates: 49.6°N 6.3667°E
- Country: Luxembourg
- Canton: Remich

Government
  - Mayor: Tim Karius

Area
  - Total: 20.35 km^{2} (7.86 sq mi)
  - Rank: 57th of 100
- Highest elevation: 321 m (1,053 ft)
  - Rank: 94th of 100
- Lowest elevation: 166 m (545 ft)
  - Rank: 11th of 100

Population (2025)
  - Total: 2,145
  - Rank: 80th of 100
  - Density: 105.4/km^{2} (273.0/sq mi)
  - Rank: 68th of 100
- Time zone: UTC+1 (CET)
  - Summer (DST): UTC+2 (CEST)
- LAU 2: LU0001203
- Website: lenningen.lu

Lenningen (German pronunciation: [ˈlɛnɪŋən]; Luxembourgish: Lenneng) is a commune and small town in southeastern Luxembourg. The commune has a population of about 1,900. It is located about 20 km east of the capital city, Luxembourg City. The commune's administrative centre is Canach.

As of September 2026, the town of Lenningen, which lies in the east of the commune, has a population of 413. The only other town within the commune is Canach.

== Population ==
Historical population

Year	Pop.	±%
1821	1,070	—
1851	1,510	+41.1%
1900	1,038	−31.3%
1910	1,086	+4.6%
1922	1,081	−0.5%
1935	956	−11.6%

Year	Pop.	±%
1947	869	−9.1%
1960	786	−9.6%
1970	814	+3.6%
1981	912	+12.0%
1990	1,007	+10.4%
2000	1,204	+19.6%

Year	Pop.	±%
2005	1,406	+16.8%
2010	1,654	+17.6%
2015	1,805	+9.1%
2020	2,017	+11.7%
2021	2,071	+2.7%

Source data
