= Schwebsange =

Town in Schengen, Luxembourg

Coordinates: 49°31′N 6°21′E

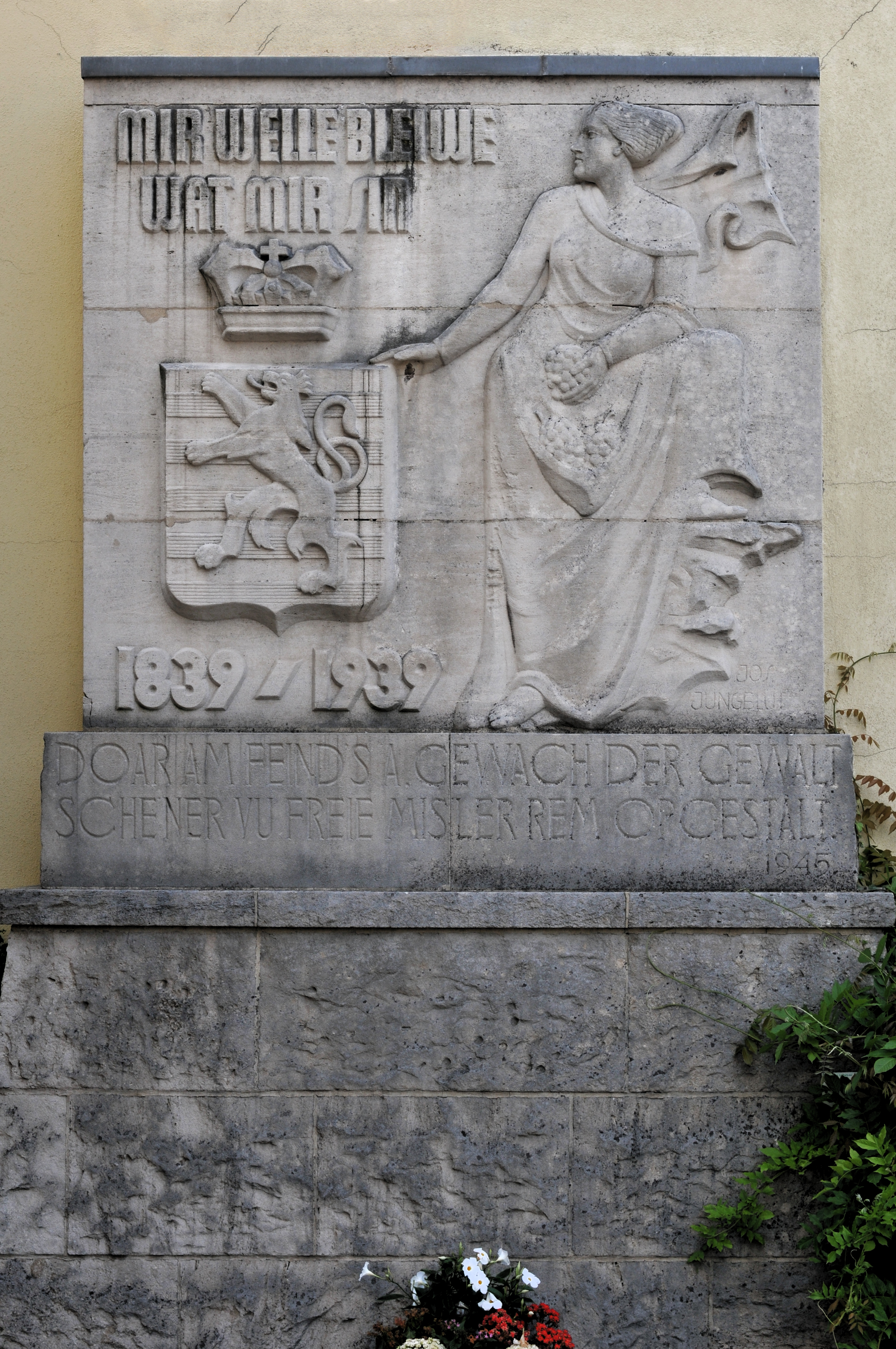
Doar am Feind's A. Gewach der Gewalt Schener vu freie Misler rem opgestallt

Schwebsange (Luxembourgish: Schwéidsbengen, German: Schwebsingen) is a small town in the commune of Schengen, in south-eastern Luxembourg. As of September 2026, the town has a population of 421.
