= Bech-Kleinmacher =

Village in Luxembourg

Coordinates: 49°32′N 6°21′E

Bech-Kleinmacher (German pronunciation: [ˌbɛçˈklaɪnmaxɐ]; Luxembourgish: Bech-Maacher [ˌbæɕˈmaːχɐ]) is a small village in the commune of Schengen, in south-eastern Luxembourg. As of September 2026, the village has a population of 711.

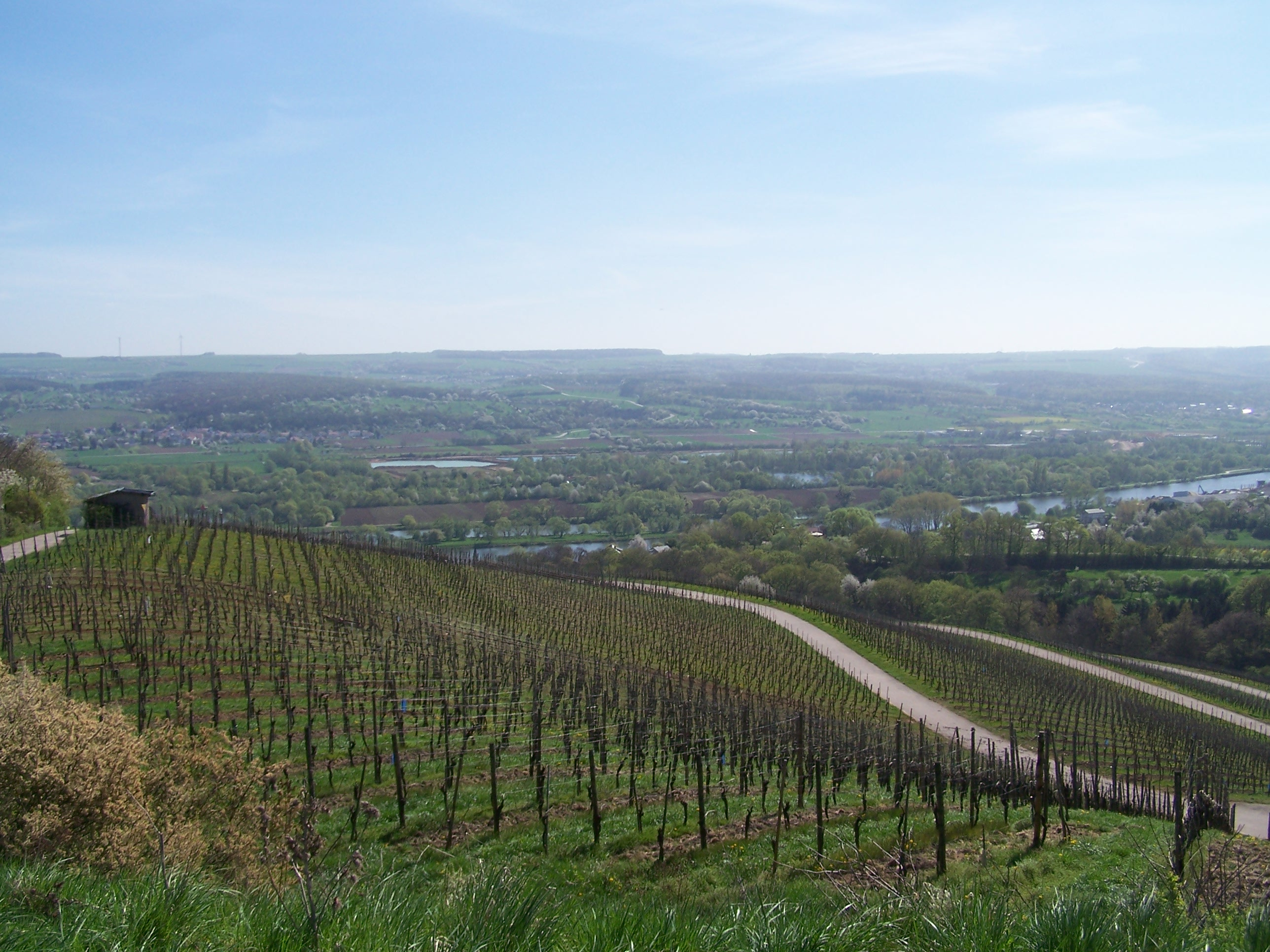
Vineyards near Bech-Kleinmacher with Germany in the background

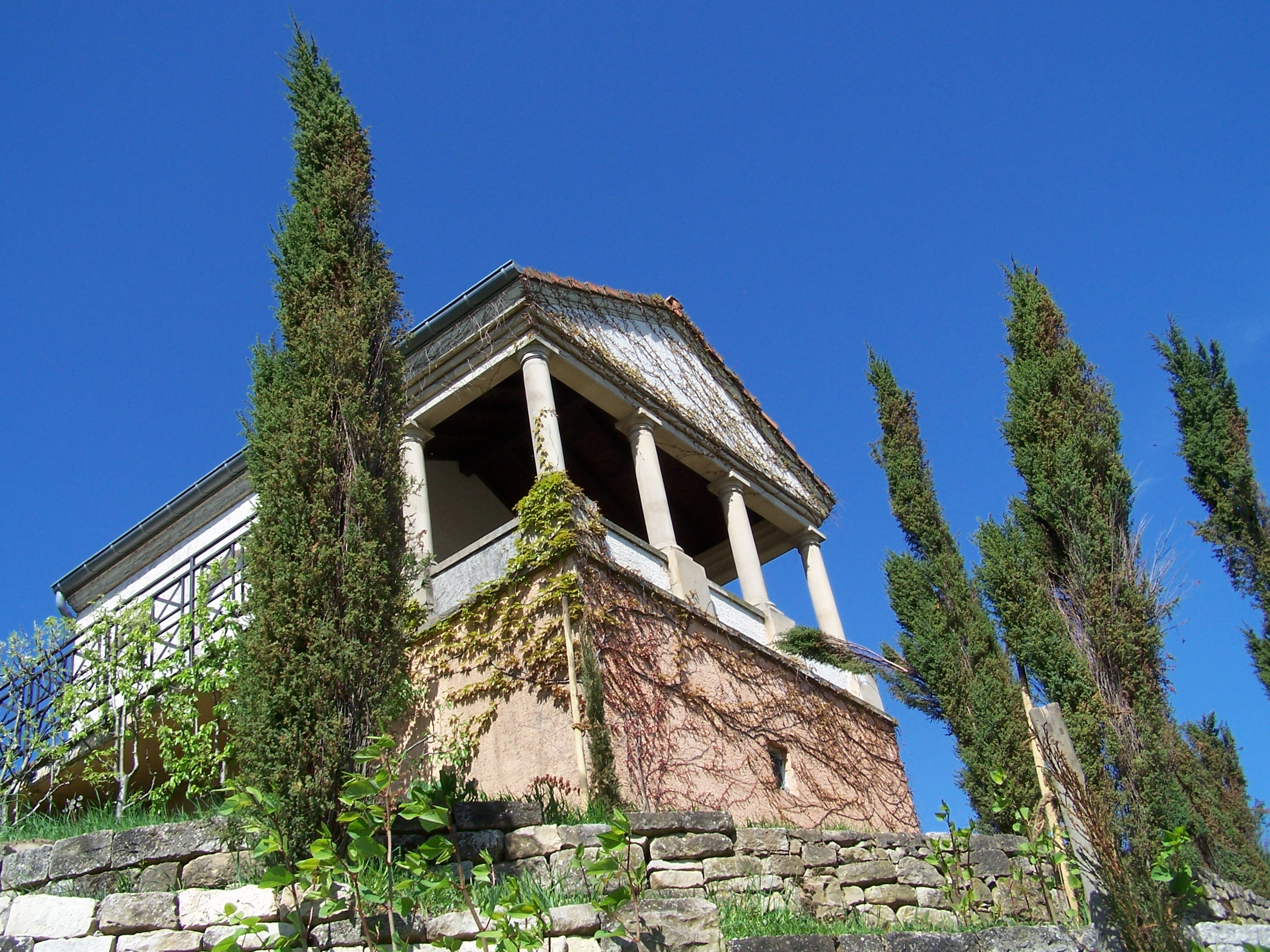
Reconstructed Roman Funeral Chamber in Bech-Kleinmacher

The village lies along the Moselle River, which forms the border with Germany. The area has been settled at least since Roman times as evidenced by the reconstructed funeral chamber that sits on a hilltop overlooking the river. Wine production is a major industry in Bech-Kleinmacher and the village is surrounded by vineyards.

The village is also home to Musée "A Possen" a folklore museum located in a 17th-century house that explores pre-industrial life, wine making, barrel making and toys.

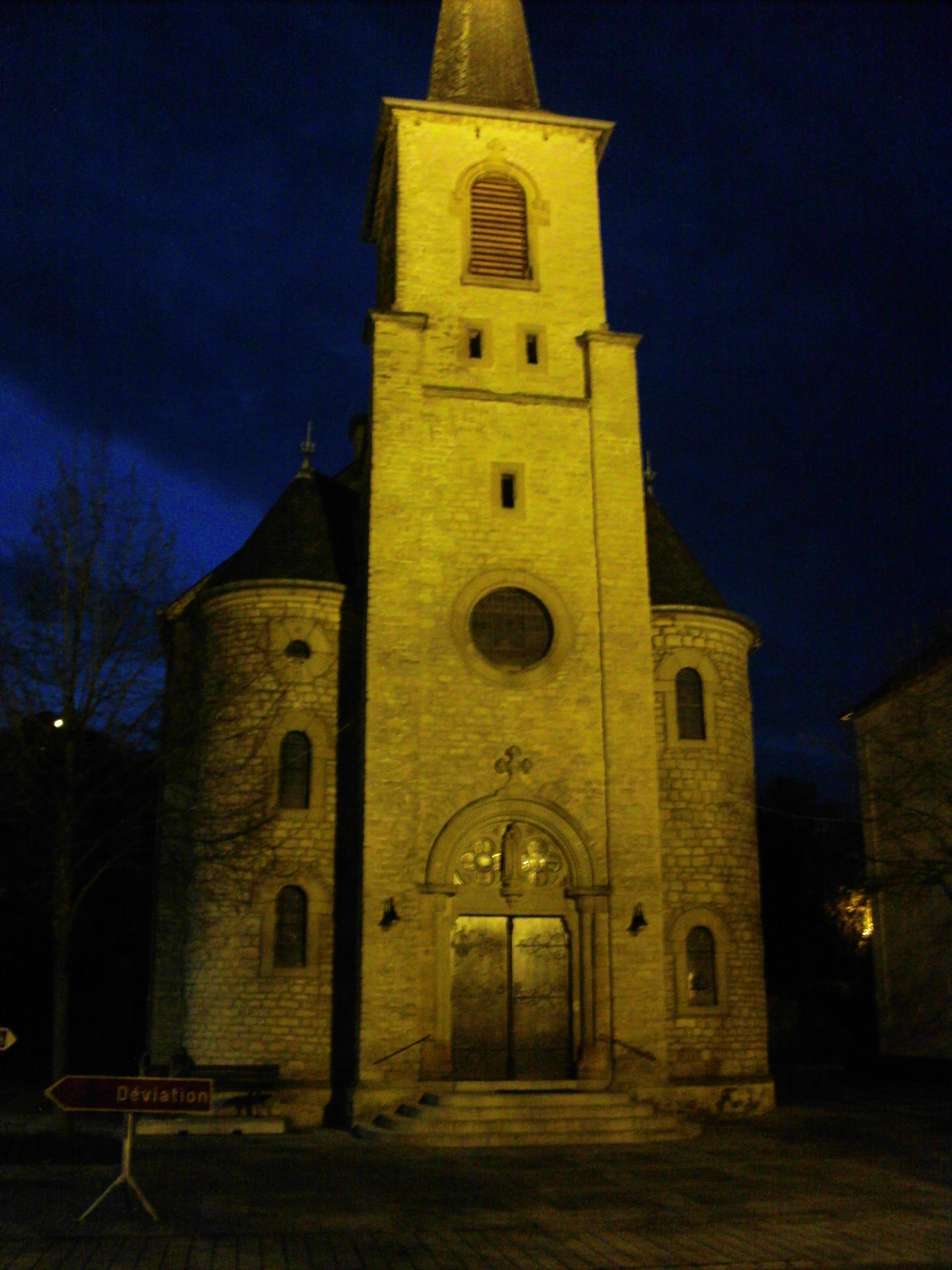
Church in Bech-Kleinmacher at night

The celebrated Luxembourg artist Nico Klopp was born in Bech-Kleinmacher on 18 September 1894. Olympian Marcel Chennaux was born here.
