= Remerschen =

Village in Luxembourg

Coordinates: 49°29′N 6°21′E

Aerial photograph of Remerschen, with Baggerweier Lake, the Moselle, and Germany in the background.

Remerschen (Luxembourgish: Rëmerschen) is a former commune and small wine-growing town in south-eastern Luxembourg, belonging to the commune of Schengen, near the point where the borders of Germany, France and Luxembourg come together.

As of September 2026, the town of Remerschen, which lies in the centre of the commune, has a population of 779.

To use the name recognition of the town of Schengen, the council of the commune of Remerschen decided on 18 January 2006 to rename the commune to Schengen. The Chamber of Deputies voted on 13 July 2006 a law allowing the change of name, which was published on 30 August 2006. The law took effect three days later, and the name of the commune of Remerschen was changed to Schengen as of 3 September 2006.

The town is famous for its Club des Jeunes, which organises enormous parties, such as the carnival fiesta Musel am Dusel.

== See also ==
- Remerschen nuclear power station
