= Rodenbourg =

Coordinates: 49°41′N 6°17′E

Rodenbourg Roudemer
- Former commune of Luxembourg
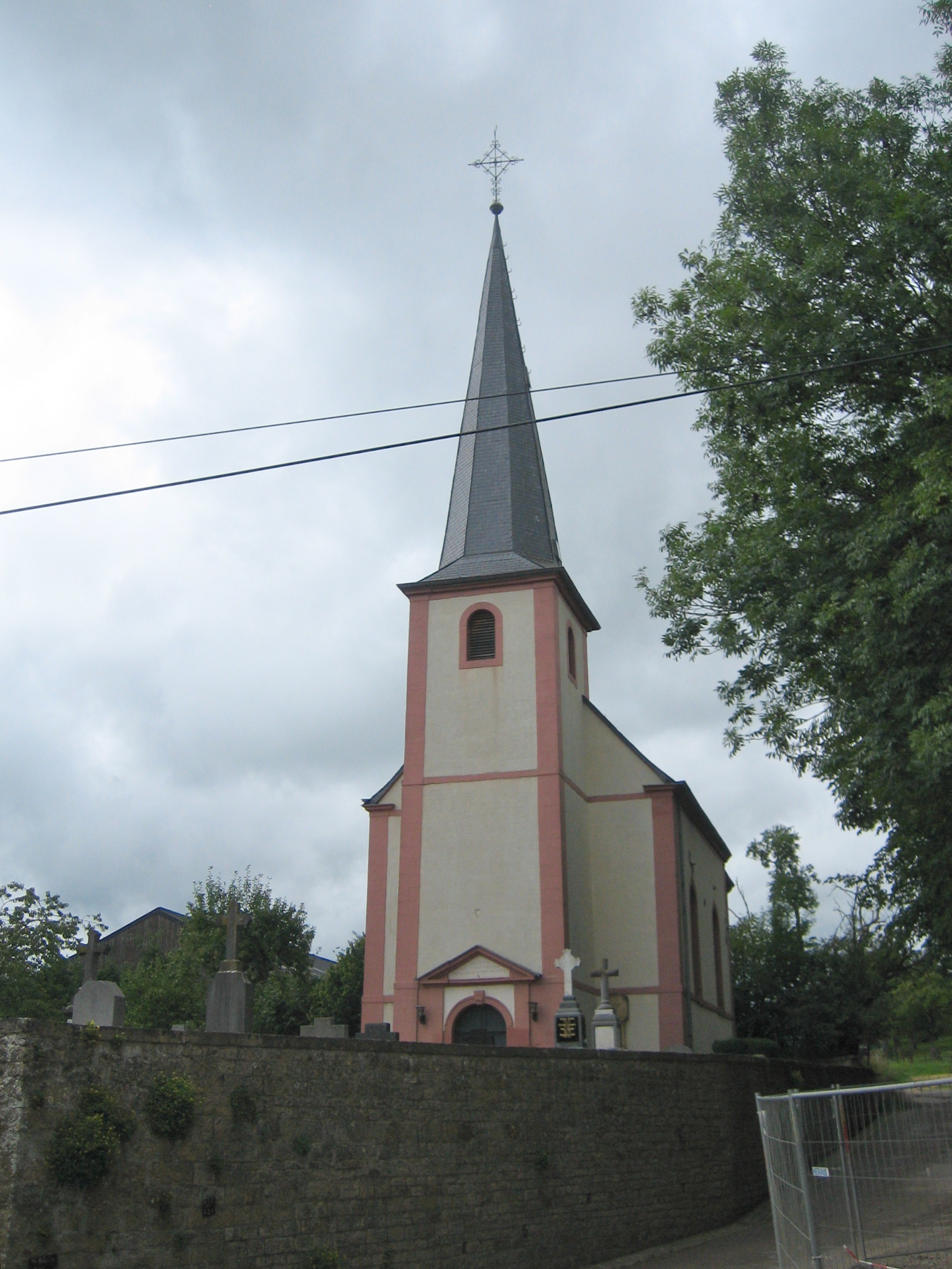
- Church of Rodenbourg, Luxembourg
- Interactive map of Rodenbourg
- Country: Luxembourg
- District: Grevenmacher
- Canton: Grevenmacher
- Created: Original commune
- Abolished: 1 January 1979
- Currently: Part of Junglinster

Rodenbourg (Luxembourgish: Roudemer, German: Rodenburg) is a village in the commune of Junglinster, in central Luxembourg. As of September 2026, the village has a population of 240 inhabitants.

Rodenbourg gave its name to a commune in the canton of Grevenmacher until 1 January 1979, when it was merged into the commune of Junglinster. The law merging Rodenbourg into Junglinster was passed on 23 December 1978.

== Former commune ==
The former commune consisted of the villages:

- Beidweiler
- Eschweiler
- Gonderange
- Rodenbourg
