= Wecker =

Wecker is a German word meaning "alarm clock" and may refer to:

- Wecker (surname), a list of people
- Wecker, Luxembourg, a town
  - Wecker railway station
- Der Wecker, a Romanian Yiddish newspaper published in 1896
- Baltimore Wecker, a 19th century German-language newspaper

== See also ==
- Weka
