= Stemper =

Stemper may refer to:

Surname:

- Alfred Matthew Stemper – bishop of Roman Catholic Archdiocese of Rabaul
- Charles J. Stemper – two-term member of the Wisconsin State Assembly
- Pierre Stemper – former mayor of Flaxweiler, Luxembourg

Geography:

- Lake Stemper, a lake in Florida
