= Godbrange =

Village in central Luxembourg

Coordinates: 49°44′N 6°14′E

Godbrange (Luxembourgish: Guedber; German: Godbringen) is a village in the commune of Junglinster, in the Canton of Grevenmacher, central Luxembourg. As of September 2026, the village has a population of 680 inhabitants.

== Geography ==
Godbrange lies within the commune of Junglinster in eastern Luxembourg. The CR130 passes through the village along Rue du Village and Rue de Schiltzberg.

The surrounding countryside includes woodland and sandstone formations. Two marked walking routes, the Walddëstelpad and Härdchespad, start at Godbrange. The Commune of Junglinster describes the landscape traversed by the Härdchespad as containing archaeological and natural features including mardelles and prehistoric traces.

== History ==
A chapel in Godbrange is documented as early as 1570. It was originally dedicated to Saint Quirin and was later dedicated to Saints Peter and Paul. The chapel was surrounded by a cemetery and appears in historical cartographic and cadastral records.

The old chapel was demolished in 1879 during the construction of the present church, with material from the earlier building reused in the new structure. The present church was designed by Luxembourgish state architect Charles Arendt. An architectural study by the Institut national pour le patrimoine architectural dates Arendt's work at Godbrange to 1879 and notes that elements developed in his earlier church designs were reused for the side elevations and portal at Godbrange.

The present-day Commune of Junglinster was formed in 1979 through the merger of the former communes of Junglinster and Rodenbourg. Godbrange is one of the localities forming the enlarged commune.

== Archaeology ==
The Gallo-Roman funerary monument at Häerdcheslee near Altlinster

The countryside around Godbrange and neighbouring Altlinster contains evidence of prehistoric and Gallo-Roman activity. The Commune of Junglinster identifies Neolithic grinding traces on sandstone rocks in the Härdchesbësch.

Nearby Häerdgeslay, in the locality of Altlinster, is a Gallo-Roman funerary monument cut into a sandstone rock formation. The surviving monument includes a weathered relief depicting two standing human figures within a niche and associated rock-cut features.

The archaeological study of Häerdgeslay describes a depression cut into the upper surface of the rock which was probably intended to receive cremated human remains. This feature distinguishes the site from a number of comparable Gallo-Roman funerary monuments in the region. The monument has also been the subject of conservation monitoring by Luxembourg's archaeological authorities.

== Church and religious heritage ==
Church of Godbrange, built in 1879

The present church stands on Rue du Village. The Commune of Junglinster includes the church among Godbrange's cultural and religious infrastructure.

The commune's heritage inventory identifies the church as an element of Godbrange's protected built environment. The inventory also records several examples of small religious heritage (petit patrimoine religieux) within the locality.

The present cemetery is located at Am Hesselter.

== Built heritage ==
Traditional building at 1 Rue de Junglinster in Godbrange

Godbrange retains a number of buildings and structures identified by the Commune of Junglinster as elements of local architectural heritage. The communal inventory includes traditional houses, principal residential buildings (corps de logis), barns and dependencies on Rue du Village, Rue du Cimetière, Rue de Schiltzberg, Rue de Junglinster and Op der Haerdchen.

Among the specifically identified structures are the village church and the Veräinshaus on Rue du Village, as well as a former labourer's house (maison de journalier) and associated agricultural buildings on Op der Haerdchen.

The commune's planning documentation places a substantial part of the historic village core within a protected built-environment sector and identifies individual constructions and small heritage features for conservation.

== Natural heritage ==
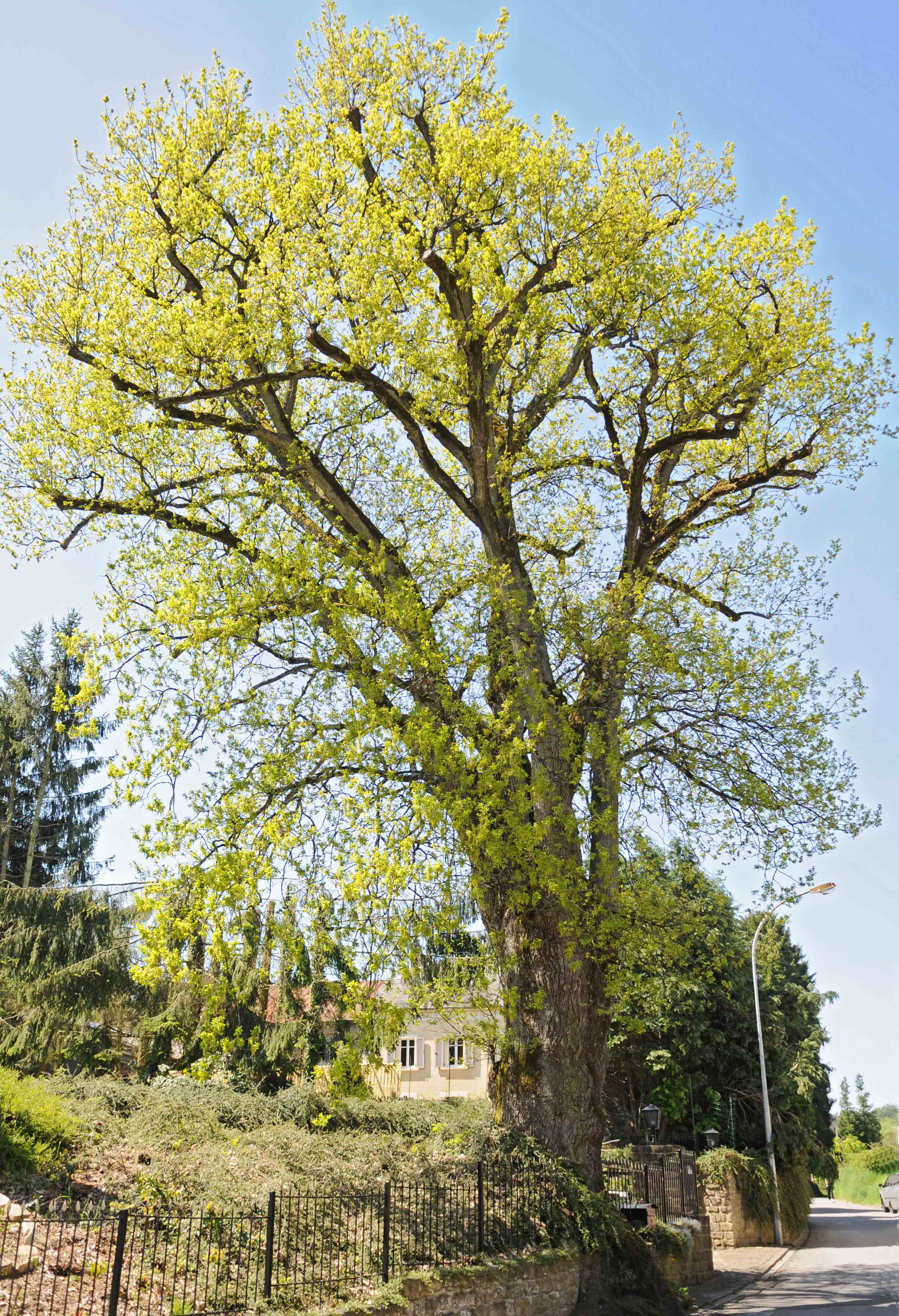
The remarkable oak known as the Guedber Eech in Godbrange

Godbrange is home to an oak (Quercus sp.) listed in Luxembourg’s official inventory of remarkable trees. The inventory records the tree for its landscape, morphological and dendrological significance, noting its prominence within the settlement, distinctive root structure and exceptional dimensions..

The tree is also included in Luxembourg's official Geoportail dataset of remarkable trees classified by Grand-Ducal regulation.

== Historic commerce ==
Commercial premises have operated on Rue du Village. In 1999, Nouveau Restaurant Dahm S.à r.l. had its registered office at 22 Rue du Village in Godbrange. The company was constituted on 11 January 1999 and dissolved on 22 December 1999.

== Culture and community ==
The Commune of Junglinster lists the Aal Schoul (Old School) on Rue du Village and the Veräinsbau Guedber at 29a Rue du Village among Godbrange's cultural infrastructure.

The village is associated with the mandolin society La Lyre Godbrange. The association's statutes, published in Luxembourg's official Mémorial, establish its registered office in Godbrange.

== Population ==
Population statistics for Godbrange are published by Luxembourg's National Register of Natural Persons (RNPP). The locality population dataset is maintained by the Centre des technologies de l'information de l'État and is updated quarterly.

== See also ==
- Junglinster
