= Eschweiler (disambiguation) =

Eschweiler is a municipality in North Rhine-Westphalia, Germany.

Eschweiler may also refer to:

== People ==
- Franz Gerhard Eschweiler (1796–1831), German botanist
- Franz C. Eschweiler (1863–1929), an American jurist
- Alexander C. Eschweiler (1865–1940), an American architect
- Karl Eschweiler (1886–1936), a German Catholic theologian and Nazi
- Walter Eschweiler (born 1935), a German football referee

== Places ==
- Eschweiler, Grevenmacher, a village in central Luxembourg
- Eschweiler, Wiltz, a town and former commune in northern Luxembourg

== Other uses ==
- Eschweiler Hauptbahnhof, a train station in the German municipality

== See also ==
- Eschweiler–Clarke reaction, named for the German chemist Wilhelm Eschweiler (1860–1936)
