= Gostingen =

Gostingen may refer to:

- Gostingen, Luxembourg
- Gostyń, Poland
