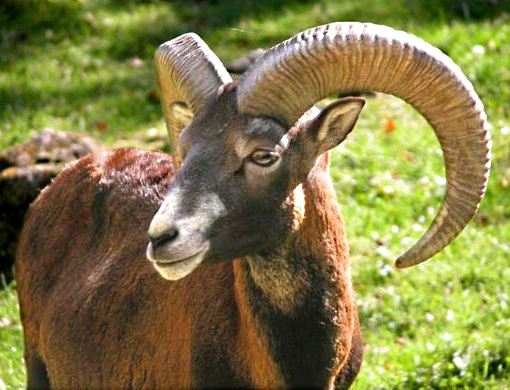

Conservation status
- Domesticated

Scientific classification
- Kingdom: Animalia
- Phylum: Chordata
- Class: Mammalia
- Order: Artiodactyla
- Family: Bovidae
- Subfamily: Caprinae
- Genus: Ovis
- Species: O. aries
- Subspecies: O. a. musimon

Trinomial name
- Ovis aries musimon (Pallas, 1811)

Synonyms
- Aegoceros musimon Pallas, 1811; Ovis aries musimon von Schreber, 1782; Ovis musimon (Pallas, 1811); Ovis musimon musimon (Pallas, 1811)

= European mouflon =

Subspecies of mammal

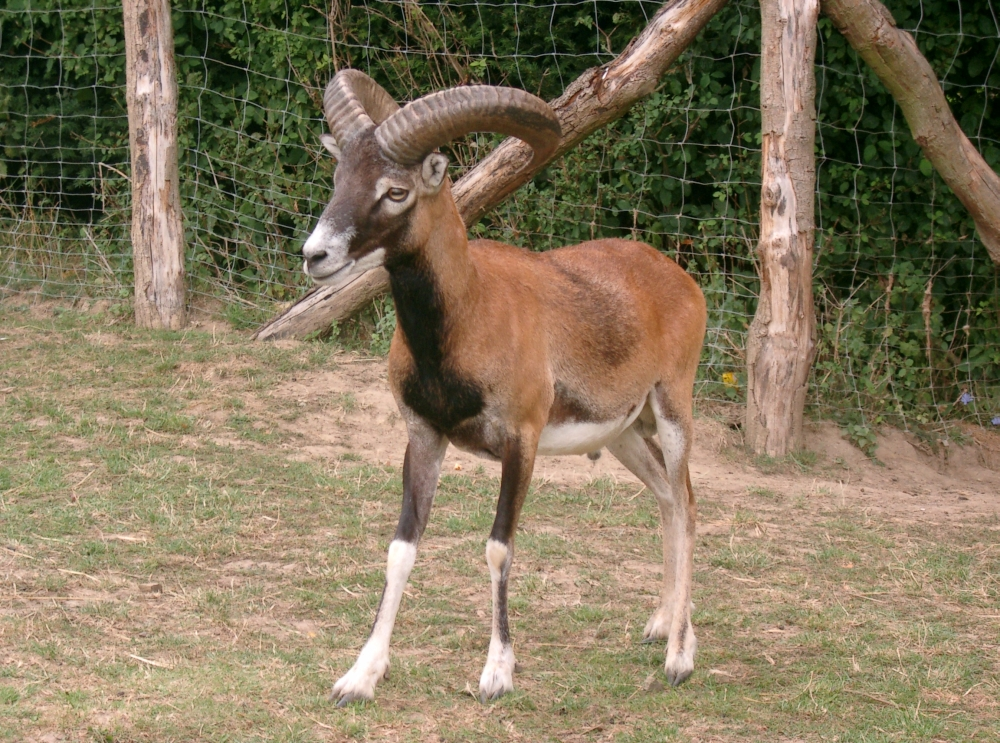
A young ram

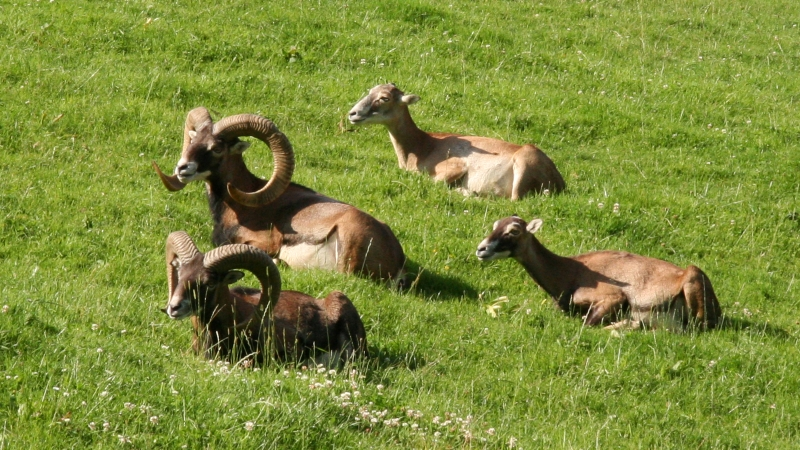
Two rams and two ewes

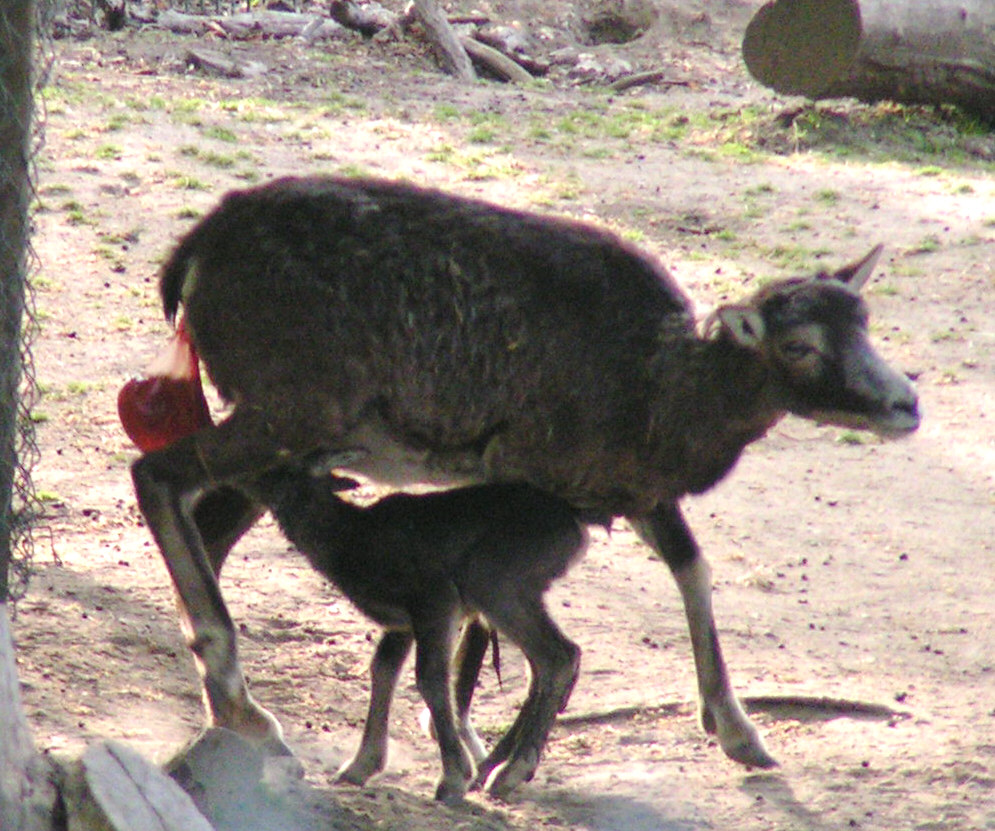
Female mouflon with young immediately after birth

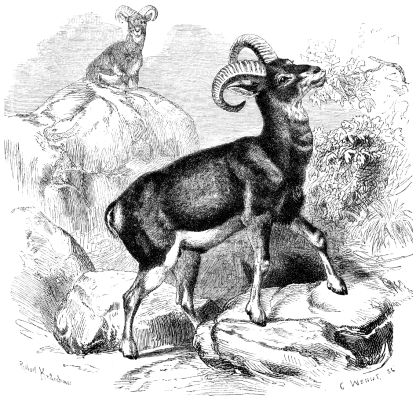
Mouflon from Brehms Tierleben

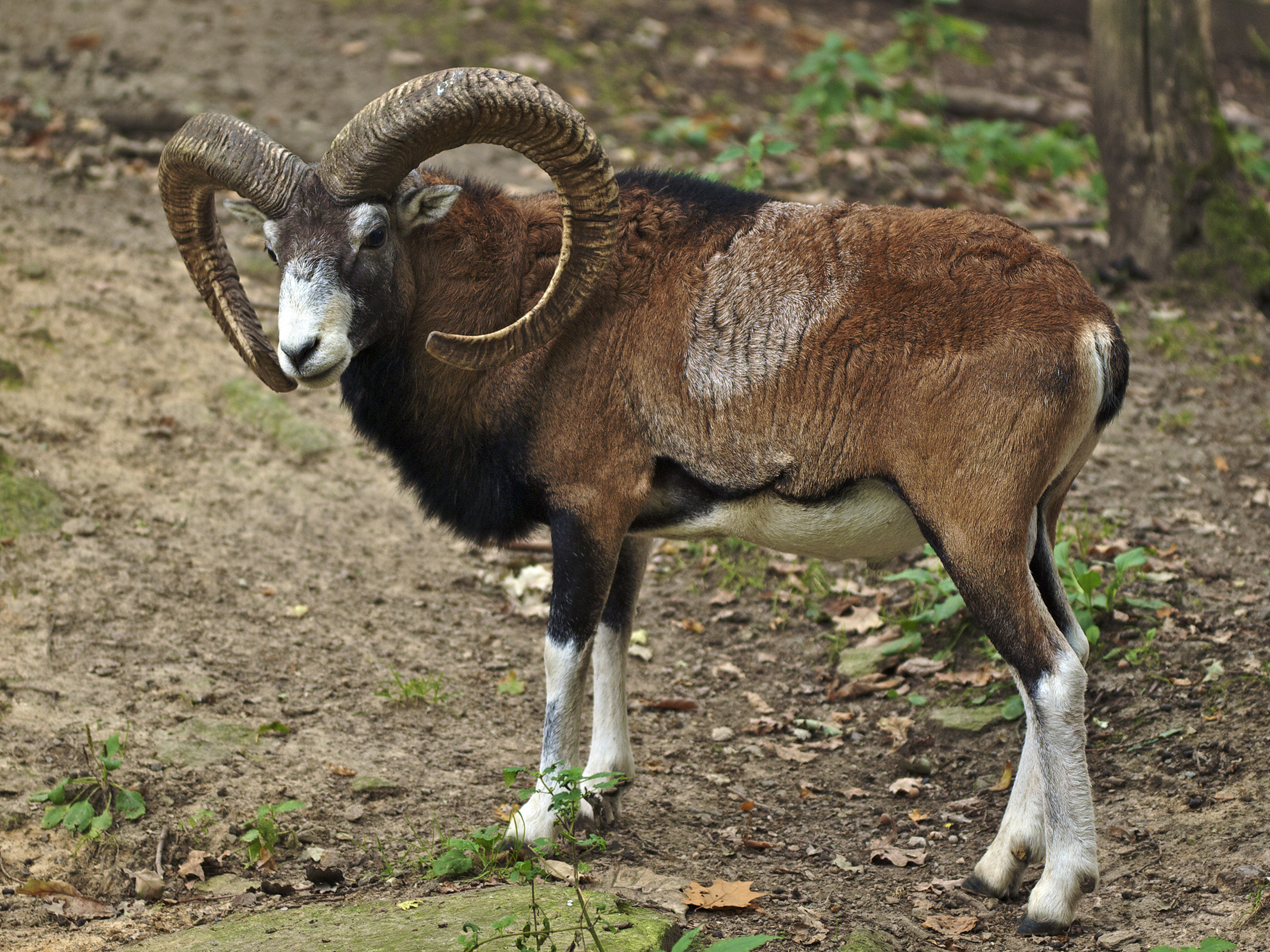
Mouflon ram

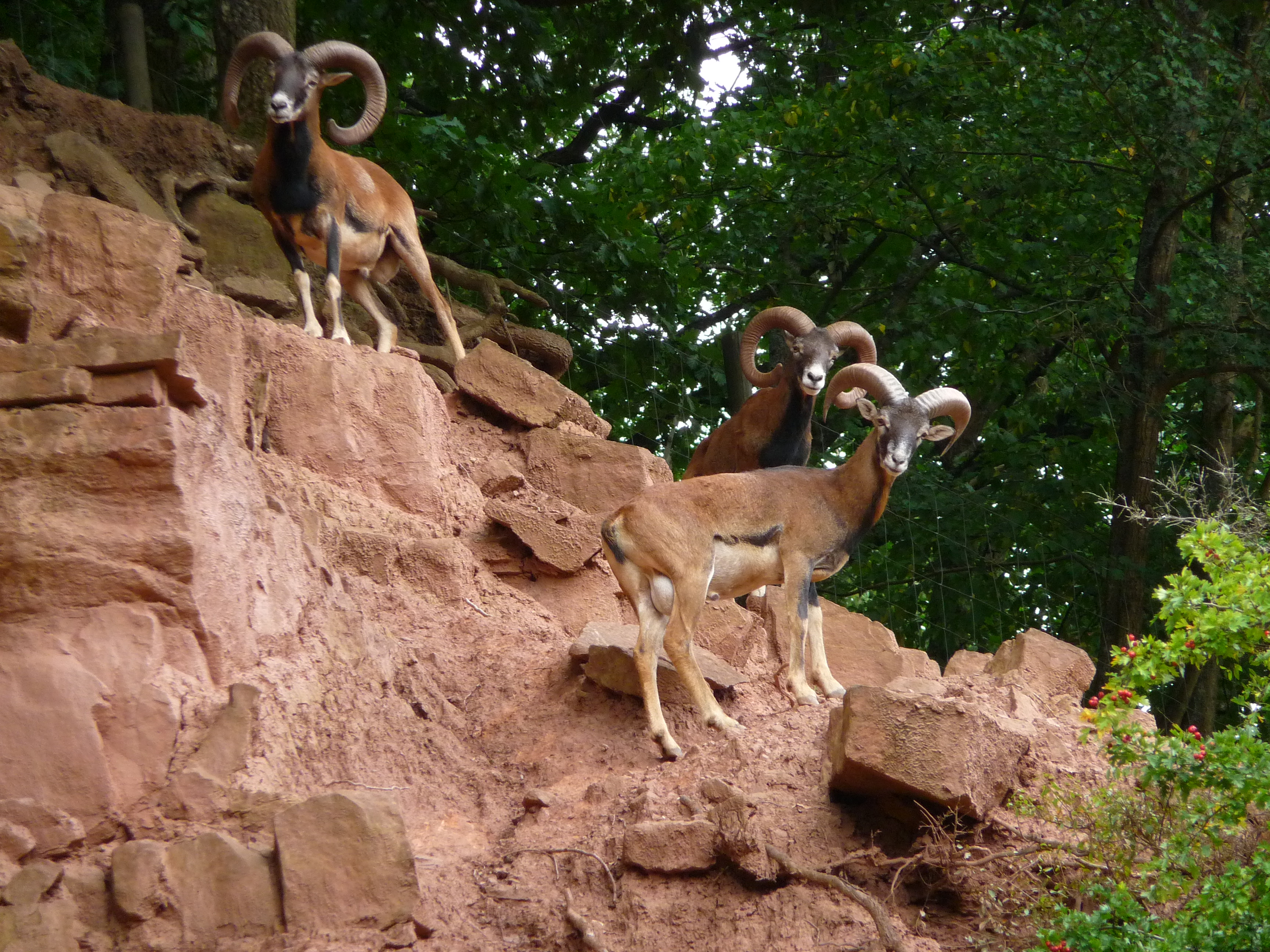
Mouflon rams in the Eifel Park, Gondorf

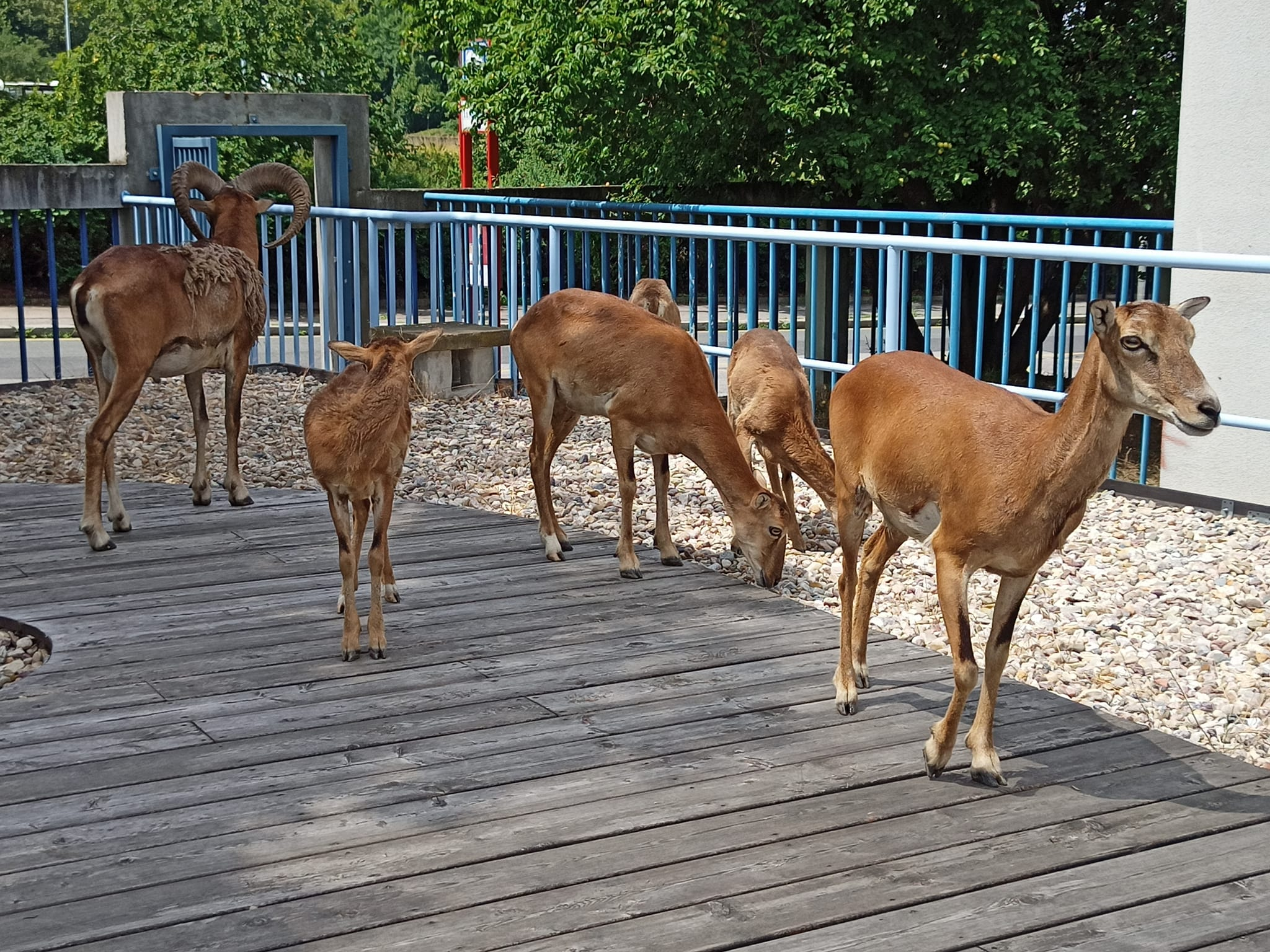
Few of the mouflon living at Thomayer Hospital in Prague

The European mouflon (Ovis aries musimon) is a feral subspecies of the primitive domestic sheep. It is found in Europe and western Asia. It is originally from western Asia.

== Description ==
Male mouflon are known as rams and the females as ewes. The young animals are known as lambs.

== Appearance ==
European mouflon have a body length of up to 120 cm, a shoulder height of 90 cm, a weight of 25 to 40 kg for ewes, 35 to 55 kg for the ram. The European mouflon has a smooth hairy coat, the rams are fox red-brown in the summer, usually with a whitish saddle patch, the ewes are brownish. Both sexes are darker in winter. The rams have helix-shaped horns up to 80 cm long; females have no horns on Sardinia, but on Corsica they have smaller horns that are slightly curved towards the rear.

== Senses ==
As an animal whose ancestors used to live in open terrain above the tree line, the eyesight of the mouflon is well developed. Its laterally-located eyes allow the mouflon to scan a wide arc without turning its head. In older rams, the field of view may be restricted by the position of the horn tip. As a result, rams begin to wear down these horns. Their binocular vision is limited to a relatively small facial arc of 60 percent; only in this area can they see any depth of field; in the rest of their visual arc, mouflon can mainly just perceive movement. If mouflon are disturbed by a movement in their lateral field of vision, they turn their head toward the object, thereby locating it within the depth of the landscape. Only then do they try to gain additional information by testing the wind and their sense of hearing, in order to assess the level of danger posed by the disturbance. People may be seen at distances of up to 1,000 metres. Their sense of sight also plays a significant role in the cohesion of the herd. Mouflon who have lost their connection to their herd, search for it by rapidly running back and forth. Only then do they use their smell to follow the herd. Hearing plays a role in the maintenance of the social relationship between the members of the herd.

== Vocalisations ==
The vocal repertoire of the mouflon is extensive and can be divided into contact and warning calls and wailing, as well as the mating calls of the rutting ram. Just a few minutes after the birth of a lamb, the ewe utters a short, sombre, bleating noise, to which the lamb replies, also bleating. In the herd, the sheep call for their lambs using a long drawn-out bleating. Lambs who are looking for their mothers bleat loudly, almost blaring. Wailing is heard from the lambs when they are attacked by an enemy or are severely injured. No wailing sound is made by adult mouflon.

When alarmed, mouflon emit a hiss through their nostrils. Often, the warning call is preceded by a nervous stomping of the front feet. The warning call is quiet when a mouflon is only slightly disturbed, but becomes much louder as danger threatens. A herd whose leader makes this sound, flees immediately. If the sound is made by another animal in the herd, the rest begin to take defensive action, but continue to wait for the reaction of the leader.

Rams make a rattling and snarling sound when chasing rutting ewes. The clashing of horns is one of the most familiar sounds of the mouflon. It is most common during the rutting season, but the rams fight each other all year round.

== Range ==
Originally, European mouflon lived in open, mountainous terrain on stony, dry soils. Today, in Central Europe, they live in deciduous and mixed forests, both on the lowlands and on the uplands and highlands such as the Central Uplands of Germany, but still preferring dry and stony soils. In unfavourable, humid soil conditions, it is easy for bowel diseases and foot rot to occur, which can be fatal.

== Predators ==
Because their escape behaviour is adapted to high mountain areas, European mouflon cannot survive in lowland areas unless natural predators are absent. Thus, for example, the mouflon population in regions of Lusatia recently settled by grey wolves was wiped out within a short period of time, while those areas' populations of wild boar and the main prey of wolves, deer, were barely affected. The applicability of this observation to other areas will be verifiable only as wolves expand their territory in Central Europe.

The reintroduction of Eurasian lynx into the Harz Mountains of Germany, in combination with hard winters, has also led to a decline in the mouflon population there.

Within the hunting community it was noted that the mouflon which were introduced in 1903 into the Göhrde State Forest was decimated by the return of the wolf and might eventually be extirpated.

== Behaviour ==
European mouflon usually form small herds with an older ewe as the leader. Rams often form separate groups outside the rutting season. During the rutting season, the rams fight over the ewes, especially by ramming each other with their curved horns, in order to push their rivals away. European mouflon are herbivores and eat a wide range of food. They also debark trees and seriously hinder tree growth. Their rutting season is in October/November; the gestation period is about five months, and birthing takes place in March/April. One or two lambs are born, the suckling time is about six months.

The escape behaviour of European mouflon is adapted to their actual high mountain habitat: in case of danger, they flee to inaccessible rock faces. In the lowlands, they can only escape short distances and become easy prey for pursuers.

== History ==
It is unclear whether the European mouflon became largely extinct in Europe as a result of its habitats being cut off and through over-hunting between 3,000 and 4,000 years ago and survived only in Corsica and Sardinia, or whether it was only introduced into the Mediterranean basin in prehistoric times. According to some zoologists, the European mouflon is not a genuine game species, but a descendant of a very early race of domestic sheep, derived from the first stocks of sheep domesticated in the Levant and other parts of the Eastern Mediterranean around 9000-8500 BCE. Therefore, it represents a nearly ten-thousand-year-old "snapshot" of the first domestication of sheep. In fact, genetic evidence suggests that European mouflon came to Corsica and Sardinia only some 7,000 years ago along with Neolithic peoples, since no traces can be found from earlier times.

Over the last 200 years, European mouflon have been kept in various places in Europe. Prince Eugene of Savoy kept mouflon in his Viennese wildlife park, some of which were transferred to the Lainz Wildlife Park. In 1840, another 19 specimens were imported from Corsica and Sardinia. After 20 years of gamekeeping, as many as sixty rams were able to be shot as game, and there were similar experiences with animals that were later reared for game in Hungary, Bohemia, and Silesia.

From the beginning of the 20th century, mouflon were introduced directly from Sardinia and Corsica as park and game animals in Germany. Here, above all, the Hamburg merchant, Oscar Louis Tesdorpf, was instrumental in driving forward their naturalisation. The first specimens were released into the Göhrde State Forest in 1903, the next ones in Harzgerode in 1906, followed by further releases in the Taunus and the Solling. In all cases, the mouflon favoured level or low-lying plains with forest cover and not, as expected, rocky, mountainous areas. Gradually they were mixed with varieties of domestic sheep, especially crossbreeding with the racka.

After the European mouflon population declined during the First World War, in the German Reich alone about 2,500 were counted in 1938. After a further decline during the Second World War, the number of European mouflon worldwide in 1954 was only about 4,500. After that, numbers recovered due to careful management and grew to about 20,000 in 1967. At that time there were 7,000 in Germany, over 2,000 in Austria, and 2,000 in Hungary and Czechoslovakia.

In the Bavarian Forest, mouflon were naturalised from 1971 to 1974 on the southern side of the forest, with the aid of the Wittelsbach Compensation Fund. At times, the population grew to almost 100 animals. By early 2008, it fell again due to tourism, hunting and the newly released lynx leaving just over 30 mouflon in the area of the Geisskopf.

In January 1969 in Luxembourg, several mouflon from the Grand Ducal park at Imbringen in the Grunewald (where mouflon had been kept since 1905), were brought to the state enclosure at Kaundorf in the Ösling. They were released in 1970 and spread to the Obersauer region. There are also mouflon in the area of Hosingen (Ösling) and especially in the canton of Echternach (Gutland).

== Current distribution ==
In Corsica and Sardinia the European mouflon was endangered by hunting and poaching. Only strict regulation and resettlements appear to have slowly stabilized the population. In Corsica, where hunting for mouflon has been prohibited since 1953, there were only about 180 in 1967, but by the 2010 the population had grown to 800. In Sardinia, the numbers in 1955 were around 700, but in 1967 this had fallen to just 300. Through protection programmes, the population rose however to over 1,000 in 1980. In 2015 there were an estimated 6,000 mouflon in Sardinia.

The relatively low numbers in Corsica contrast with the rest of the current range of the mouflon. Today the largest numbers live in the Czech Republic, Germany, Hungary and Austria and there are still large populations in Spain, Poland, France, Slovenia, Slovakia, Croatia, Bosnia Herzegovina, Serbia and Bulgaria.

In the introduced populations of Central Europe it is estimated that there are over 60,000 mouflon (in 2005 there were 90,000), the largest population being in the Czech Republic (17,500). A herd of mouflon lives in the garden of the Thomayer University Hospital in Prague. The population in Germany was around 15,600 animals in 2010 (c. 20,600 in 2005) living in about 120 groups. In Hungary there are around 10,600 and in Austria about 7,500 mouflon (no herds in Vorarlberg). In the early 1980s, mouflon migrated from France to the Swiss canton of Valais, where there are now two colonies with a population of around 200 animals. The IUCN considers the European mouflon as feral populations of ancient domestic livestock, and therefore does not provide an assessment for the subspecies' conservation status.

== Hunting ==
Mouflon have a well-developed vision and can recognize a human at a range of over 1,000 metres, unlike deer which rely mainly on smell. Despite their small size and weight, mouflon are very hard to kill and have to be hunted with weapons of sufficiently high calibre in order to ensure successful first-time kills. It is commonly hunted in Texas due to the number of game ranches there.

It has also been introduced to Hawaii.

=== Germany ===
In Germany the hunting of mouflon is governed by hunting rights in accordance with the Federal Hunting Act. In the 2015/16 hunting season the bag in Germany amounted to 8,000 mouflon (in 2010/11 there were 7,270), of which 3,000 were shot in Rhineland-Palatinate and Thuringia alone, 38% of the total cull. The numbers shot have remained almost constant for over ten years. The relatively high cull compared to the overall population arises from the need to keep wildlife damage under control as well as to ensure a healthy population.

=== Austria ===
In the 2015/16 hunting season, the total numbers culled in Austria came to 2,450 mouflon (in 2014/15 it was 2,640), of which 885 were shot in Lower Austria alone, corresponding to 36 per cent of the total cull.
