= Hagelsdorf =

Village in Biwer, Grevenmacher, Luxembourg

Coordinates: 49°41′N 6°22′E

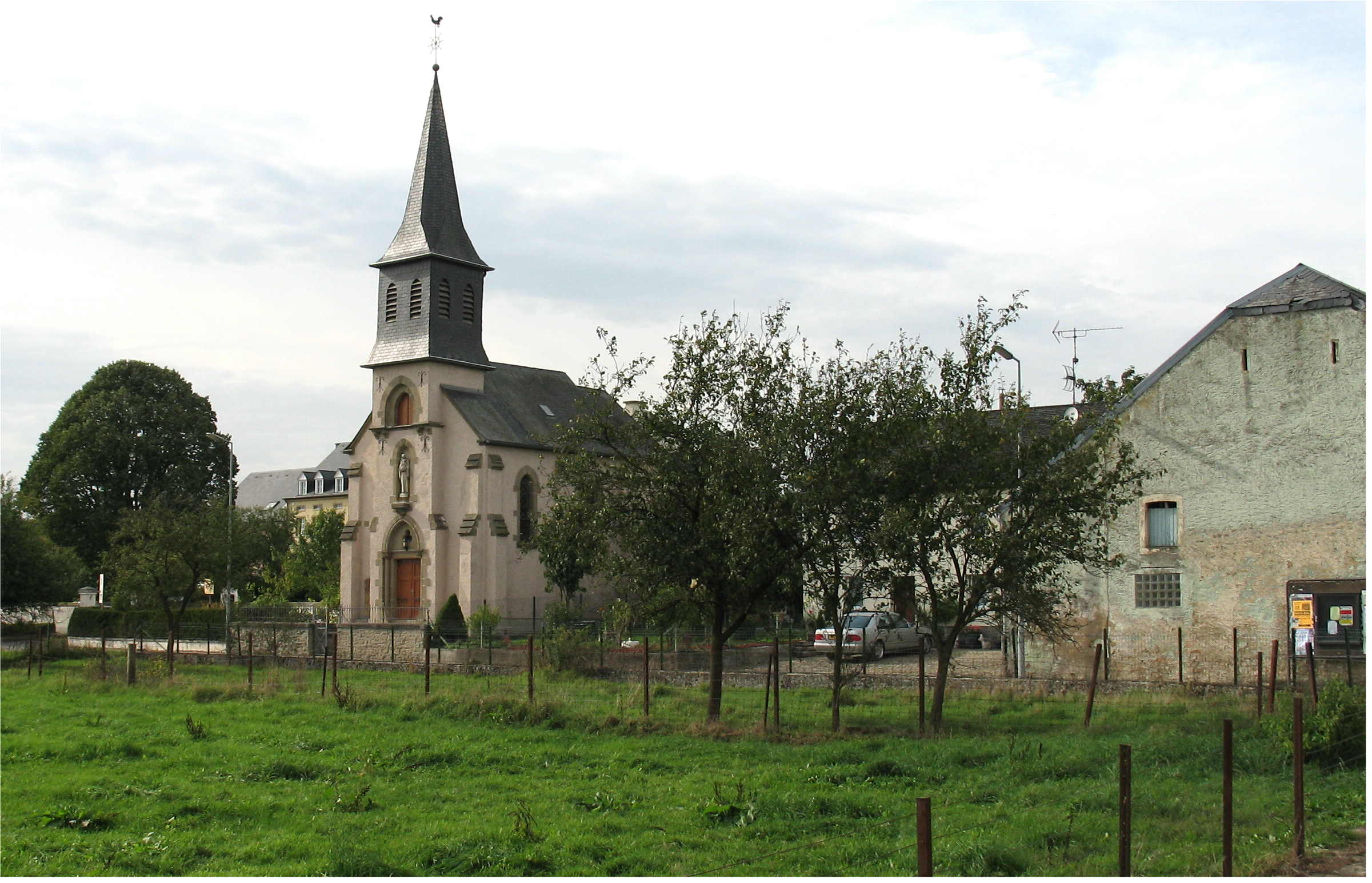
Manor in Hagelsdorf

Hagelsdorf (German pronunciation: [ˈhaːɡl̩sˌdɔʁf]; Luxembourgish: Haastert) is a small village in the commune of Biwer, in the canton of Grevenmacher, in Luxembourg. As of September 2026 it has a population of 26 inhabitants.
