= Biwer =

- Commune
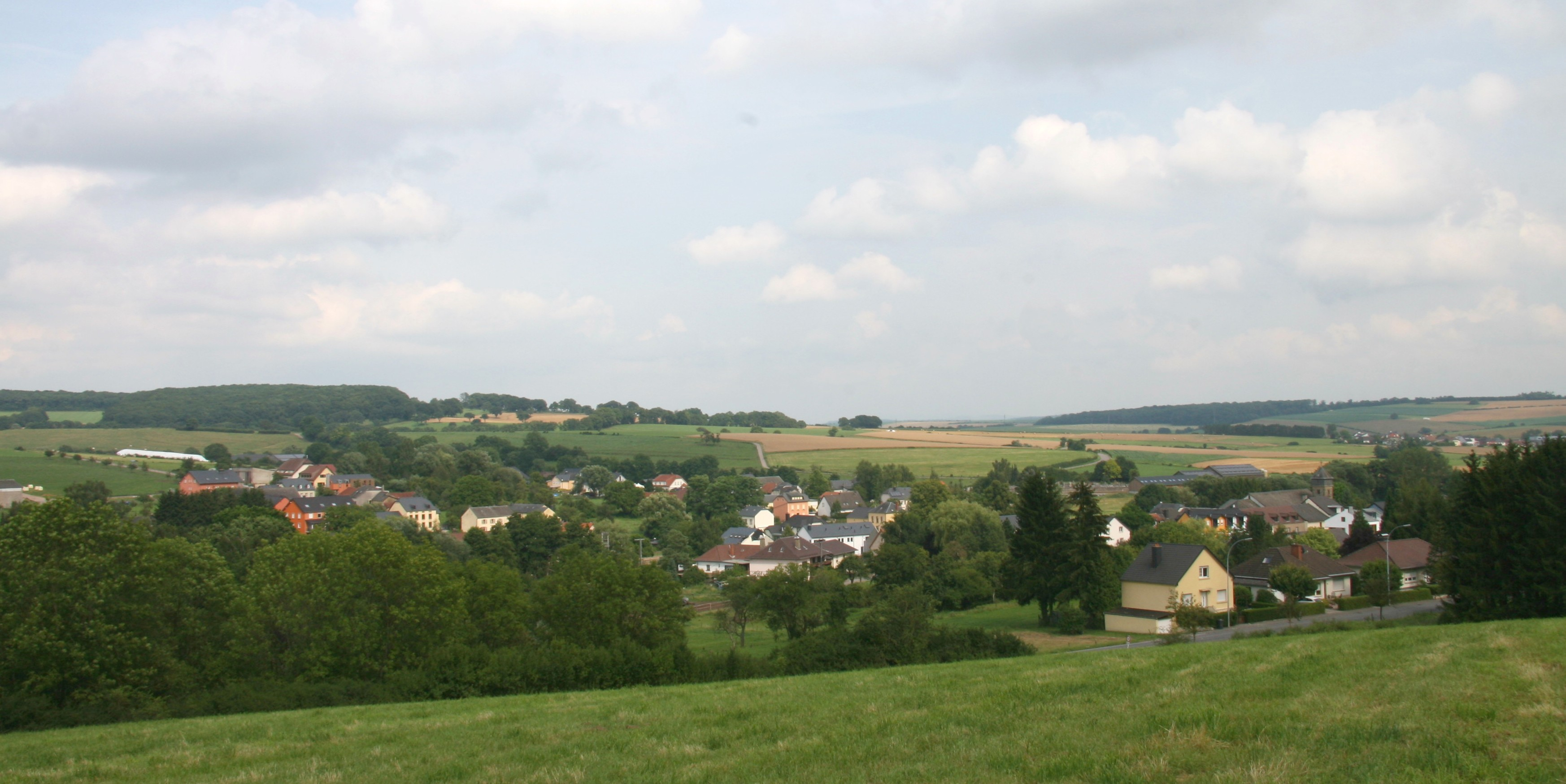

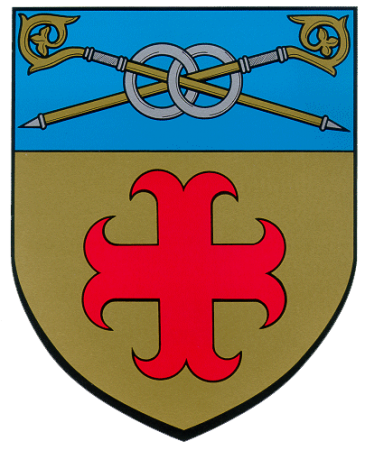
- Coat of arms

- Map of Luxembourg with Biwer highlighted in orange, and the canton in dark red
- Coordinates: 49.7069°N 6.3722°E
- Country: Luxembourg
- Canton: Grevenmacher

Government
  - Mayor: Marc Lentz (Independent)

Area
  - Total: 23.08 km^{2} (8.91 sq mi)
  - Rank: 42nd of 100
- Highest elevation: 332 m (1,089 ft)
  - Rank: 91st of 100
- Lowest elevation: 210 m (690 ft)
  - Rank: 30th of 100

Population (2025)
  - Total: 1,911
  - Rank: 85th of 100
  - Density: 82.80/km^{2} (214.4/sq mi)
  - Rank: 76th of 100
- Time zone: UTC+1 (CET)
  - Summer (DST): UTC+2 (CEST)
- LAU 2: LU0001102
- Website: biwer.lu

Biwer (Luxembourgish pronunciation: [ˈbiːvɐ]) is a commune and small town in eastern Luxembourg. It is part of the canton of Grevenmacher. As of 2023, the commune has a population of 1,926 inhabitants.

As of September 2026, the town of Biwer, which lies in the east of the commune, has a population of 849 inhabitants. Other localities within the commune include, Boudler, Brouch, Hagelsdorf, Wecker, and Weydig.

== Population ==
Historical population

Year	Pop.	±%
1821	626	—
1851	1,003	+60.2%
1900	1,169	+16.6%
1910	1,282	+9.7%
1922	1,172	−8.6%
1935	1,131	−3.5%

Year	Pop.	±%
1947	1,083	−4.2%
1960	1,070	−1.2%
1970	1,035	−3.3%
1981	1,005	−2.9%
1990	1,127	+12.1%
2000	1,404	+24.6%

Year	Pop.	±%
2005	1,655	+17.9%
2010	1,647	−0.5%
2015	1,821	+10.6%
2020	1,834	+0.7%
2021	1,884	+2.7%

Source data
