= Eisenborn =

Village in Luxembourg

Coordinates: 49°41′22″N 6°11′11″E

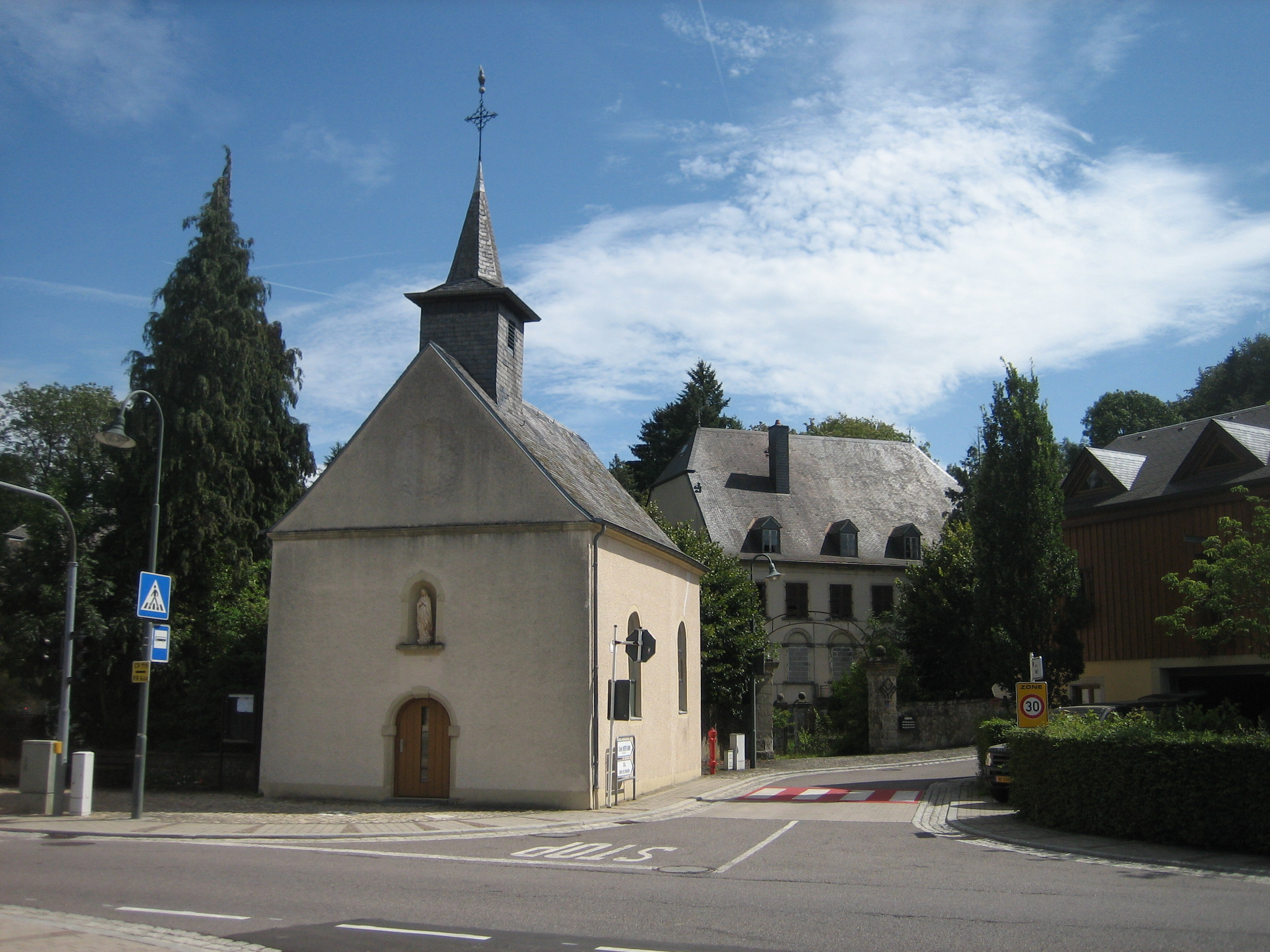
Chapel in Eisenborn, Luxembourg

Eisenborn (German pronunciation: [ˈaɪzn̩ˌbɔʁn]; Luxembourgish: Eesebur) is a village in the commune of Junglinster, in central Luxembourg. As of September 2026, the village has a population of 357.
