= St Martin's church, Junglinster =

Roman Catholic church in Luxembourg

Coordinates: 49.71449°N 6.25231°E

Church of St Martin
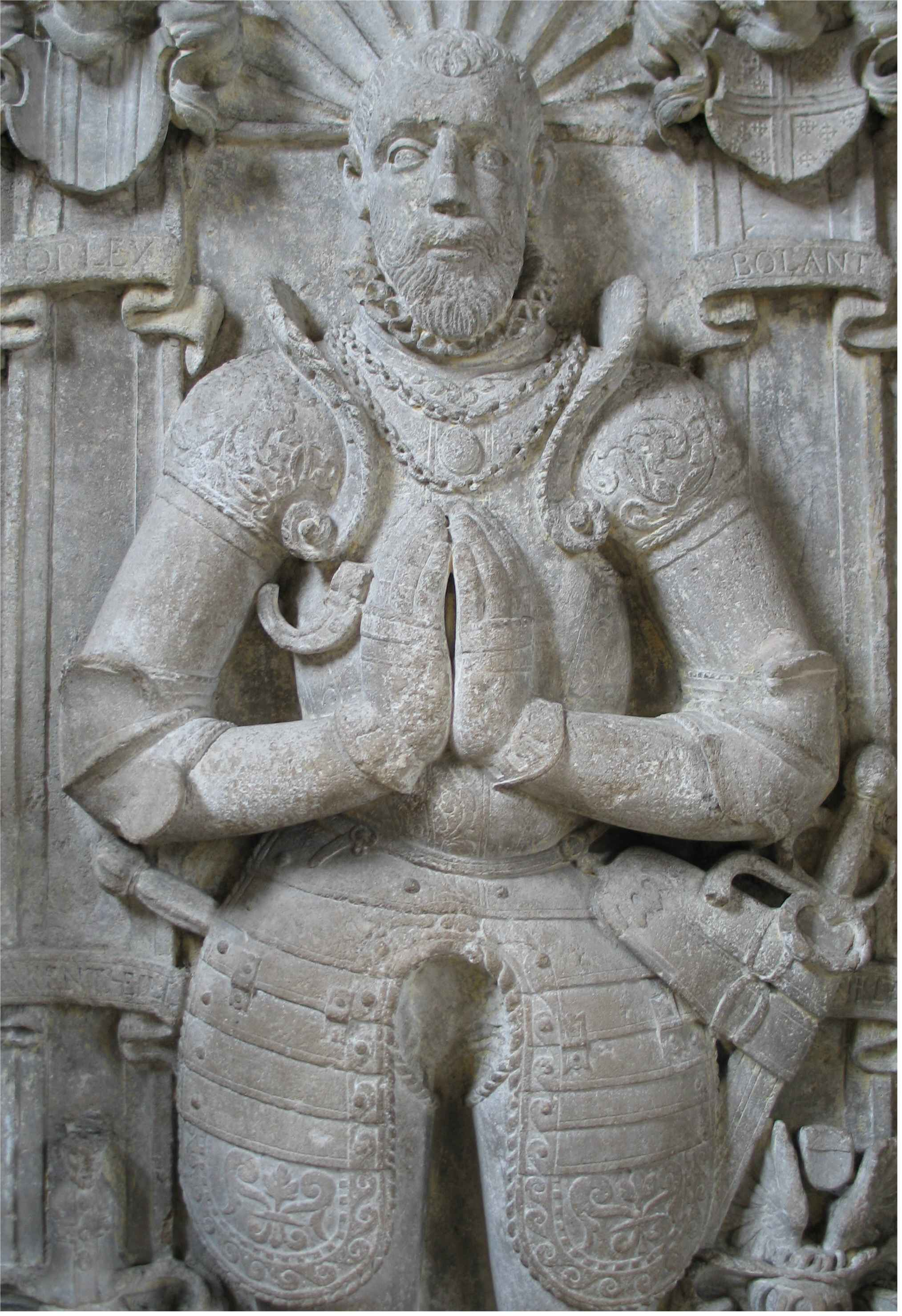
- Monument of Bernhardt, Lord d'Orley (died 1591)
- Church of St Martin
- Country: Luxembourg
- Denomination: Catholic

History
- Dedication: Martin of Tours
- Consecrated: 24 July 1774

Architecture
- Heritage designation: national monument
- Architect: Paul Mungenast (1735–1797)
- Architectural type: Baroque
- Years built: 1772–1773
- Completed: 1 April 1773
- Construction cost: 6000 écu

St Martin's church is an 18th-century listed building and Catholic parish church in Junglinster, Grevenmacher (Luxembourg). It contains artworks and monuments from the older parish church that the building replaced. The oldest monuments commemorate members of the noble d'Orley family, to whom the Renaissance artist Bernard van Orley was related.

== History ==
The parish has existed since medieval times, but by 1688 the original church was in a state of disrepair, and litigation about who was responsible for upkeep delayed renovation. In January 1744, Johannes Otto Borrigs became parish priest. In the 1750s Borrigs laid out a walled garden around the presbytery, and in 1762 had a new presbytery built in the style of a manor house. The contrast between the new presbytery and the dilapidation of the church itself led to pressure to build a new church. Agreement was reached in 1771, and the new building was erected in 1772–1773, to plans attributed to Paul Mungenast (1735–1797), master of works to the Abbey of Echternach. The inspiration for the design was the Basilica of St. Paulinus, Trier.

The building was consecrated on 24 July 1774 by the auxiliary bishop, Johann Nikolaus von Hontheim. The murals were painted by the Czech artist Ignatius Millim (1747–1820). The Altar of Our Lady dates to 1903.

Enlargement works were carried out in 1938, and restorations in 1973 and 2010.
