= Niederdonven =

Town in the commune of Flaxweiler in Luxembourg

Coordinates: 49°38′N 6°24′E

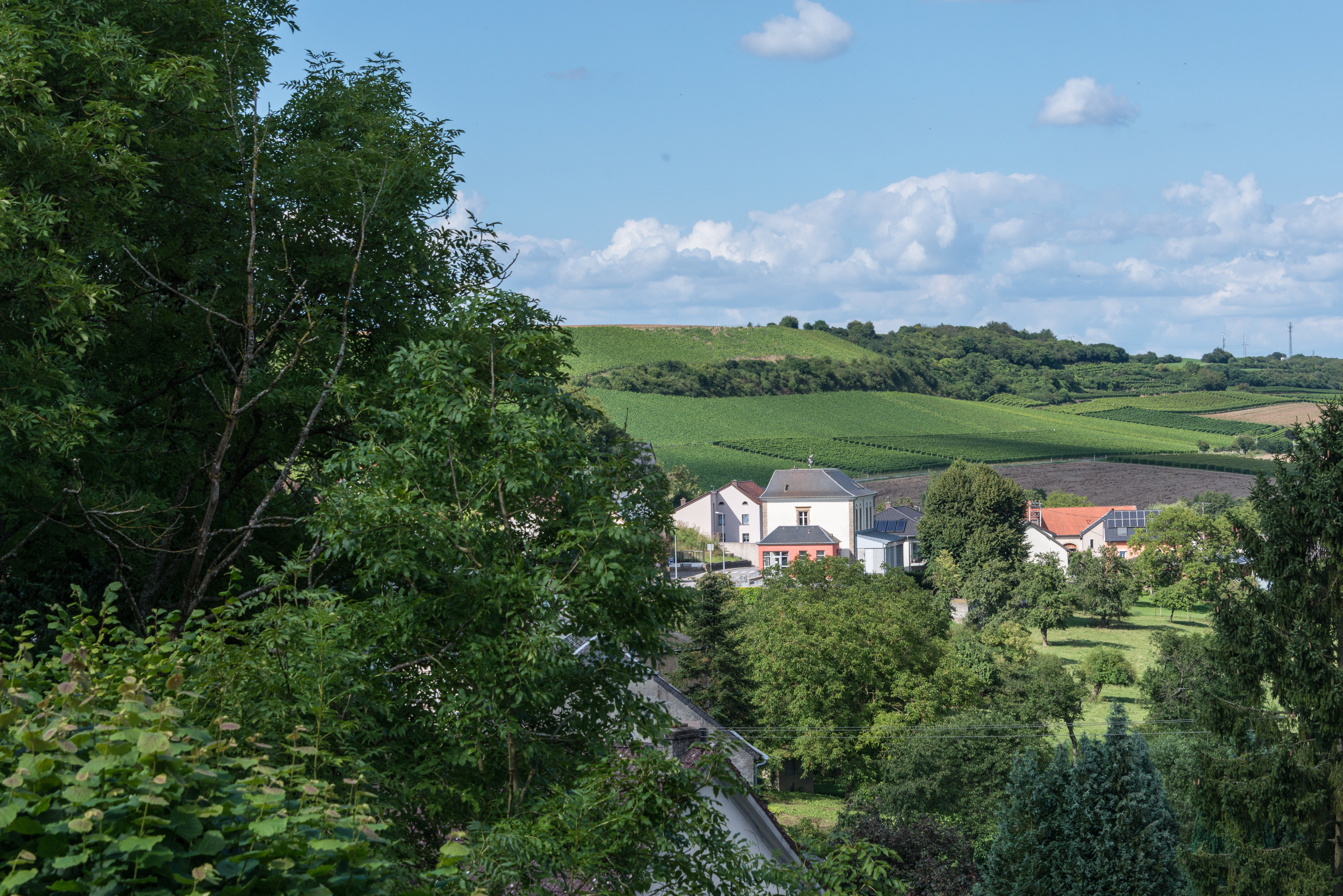
Niederdonven among vineyards

Niederdonven (Luxembourgish: Nidderdonwen) is a small town in the commune of Flaxweiler, in the canton of Grevenmacher in south-eastern Luxembourg. The town name refers to the crop Flax which once grew there. As of September 2026, the town has a population of 476.
