= Beyren =

Village in Luxembourg

Coordinates: 49°38′N 6°20′E

Beyren (Luxembourgish: Beyeren) is a village in the commune of Flaxweiler, in south-eastern Luxembourg. As of September 2026, the town has a population of 414.
