= Junglinster =

Administrative division in Grevenmacher, Luxembourg

Junglinster Jonglënster (Luxembourgish)
- Commune
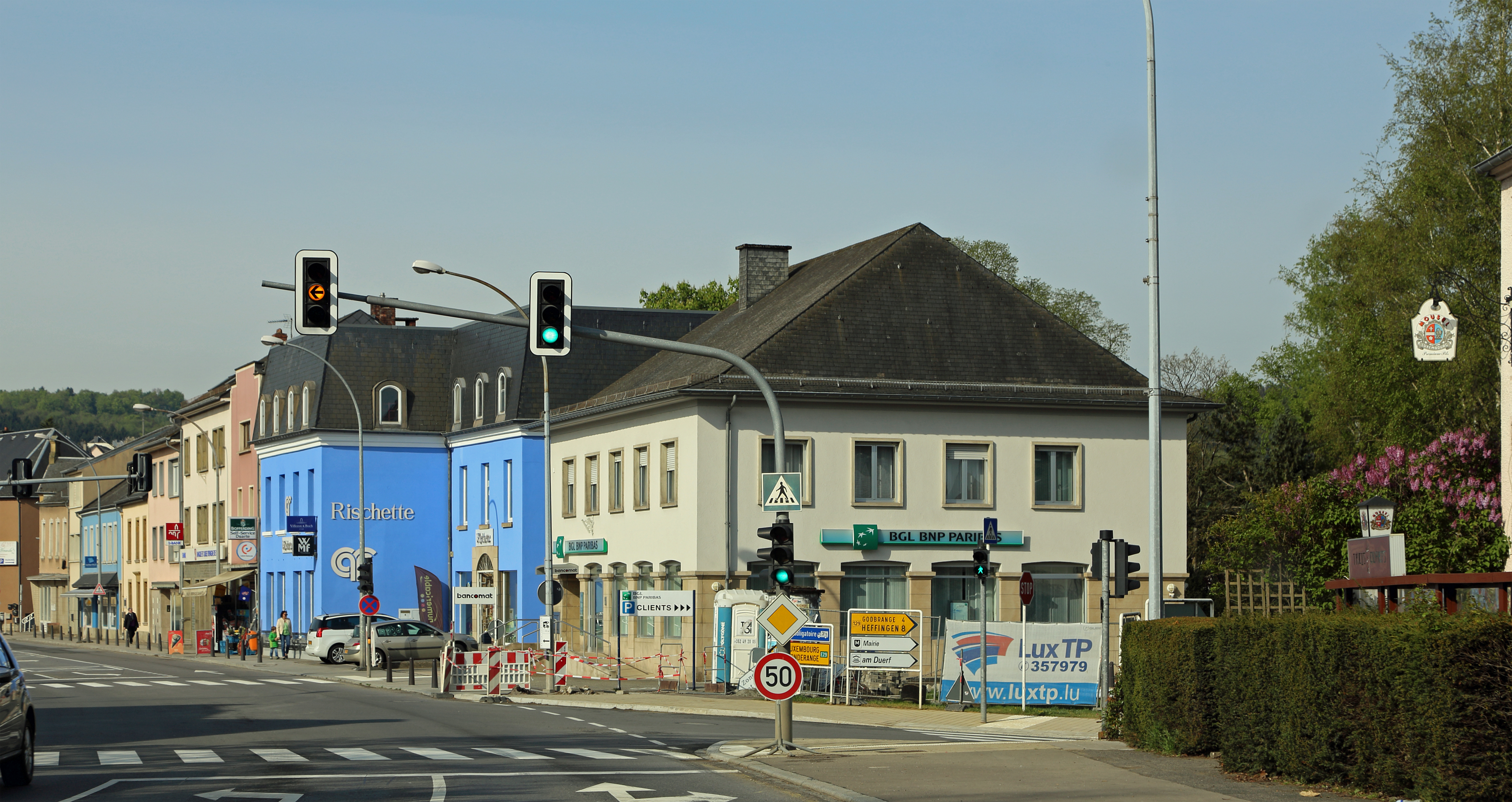

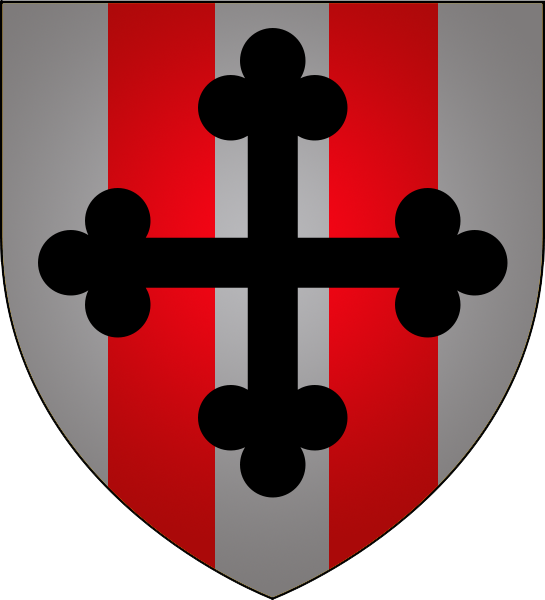
- Coat of arms

- Map of Luxembourg with Junglinster highlighted in orange, and the canton in dark red
- Coordinates: 49.7111°N 6.2514°E
- Country: Luxembourg
- Canton: Grevenmacher

Government
  - Mayor: Ben Ries

Area
  - Total: 55.38 km^{2} (21.38 sq mi)
  - Rank: 6th of 100
- Highest elevation: 411 m (1,348 ft)
  - Rank: 41st of 100
- Lowest elevation: 243 m (797 ft)
  - Rank: 53rd of 100

Population (2026)
  - Total: 9,307
  - Rank: 18th of 100
  - Density: 168.1/km^{2} (435.3/sq mi)
  - Rank: 50th of 100
- Time zone: UTC+1 (CET)
  - Summer (DST): UTC+2 (CEST)
- LAU 2: LU0001105
- Website: www.junglinster.lu

Junglinster (German pronunciation: [jʊŋˈlɪnstɐ]) (Luxembourgish: Jonglënster) is a commune and town in central Luxembourg, in the canton of Grevenmacher. The 18th-century St Martin's church is a national monument.

== History ==
The oldest mention of Lincera (the "linster" part of the place name) is in documents going back to 983, with the status of parish first attested in 1128.

== Population ==
As of September 2026, the town of Junglinster has a population of 3,957, whilst the wider commune of Junglinster has a population of 8,622. Figures from 2018 report that 64.11% of the population of the commune holds Luxembourgish nationality, with the five largest immigrant populations in the commune being those of Portuguese (7.77%), French (5.12%), German (3.88%), Belgian (3.27%) and British (1.91%) nationalities.

Historical population

Year	Pop.	±%
1821	2,145	—
1851	3,263	+52.1%
1900	2,828	−13.3%
1910	2,699	−4.6%
1922	2,517	−6.7%
1935	2,491	−1.0%

Year	Pop.	±%
1947	2,540	+2.0%
1960	2,522	−0.7%
1970	2,662	+5.6%
1981	3,657	+37.4%
1990	4,606	+26.0%
2000	5,561	+20.7%

Year	Pop.	±%
2005	5,915	+6.4%
2010	6,341	+7.2%
2015	7,094	+11.9%
2020	8,090	+14.0%
2021	8,233	+1.8%

Source data

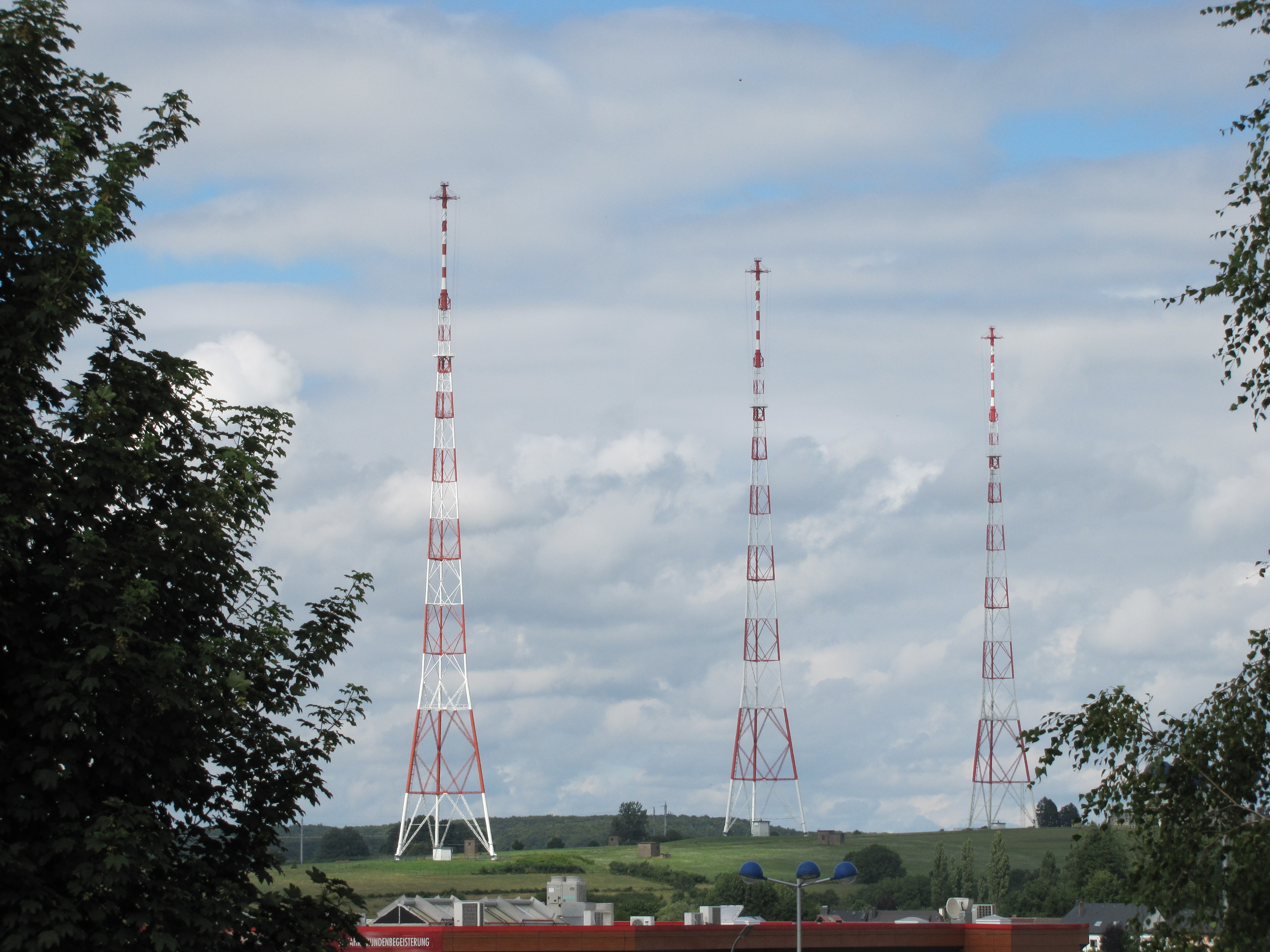
Junglinster Transmitter

== Transmitters ==
The commune hosted two of the world's most powerful longwave transmitters, with the older transmitter based just north of the town of Junglinster since 1933, and a more powerful longwave transmitter located in Beidweiller since 1972. These transmitters were utilised by Radio Luxembourg, which gained iconic status amongst audiences in Britain and Ireland in the 1930s and again in the 1960s and 1970s, for popular programmes that circumvented restrictive broadcasting laws, particularly in the UK. This gave Junglinster an important role in the history of pirate radio. The transmitters were previously in use by French-speaking radio station RTL, but were switched off on 2 January 2023. The Beidweiler masts were demolished in a controlled explosion on 6 November 2026 at just after 3:00 pm, while the Junglinster towers are also facing demolition within 2026.

== Populated places ==
The commune consists of the following towns and villages:

Junglinster Section:

- Altlinster
- Blumenthal
- Bourglinster
- Eisenborn
- Godbrange
- Graulinster
- Imbringen
- Junglinster (seat)
- Behlen
- Jeanharis

Rodenbourg Section:

- Beidweiler
- Eschweiler
- Gonderange
- Rodenbourg

== Notable people ==
- Eugène Schaus (1901–1978), a Luxembourgish politician and jurist.
- Lex Jacoby (1930 in Junglister – 2015), writer; winner of the Servais Prize for Literature

== Twin towns ==
Junglinster is twinned with:

- Üdersdorf, Germany
- La Crosse, United States
