= Oberdonven =

Coordinates: 49°39′N 6°24′E

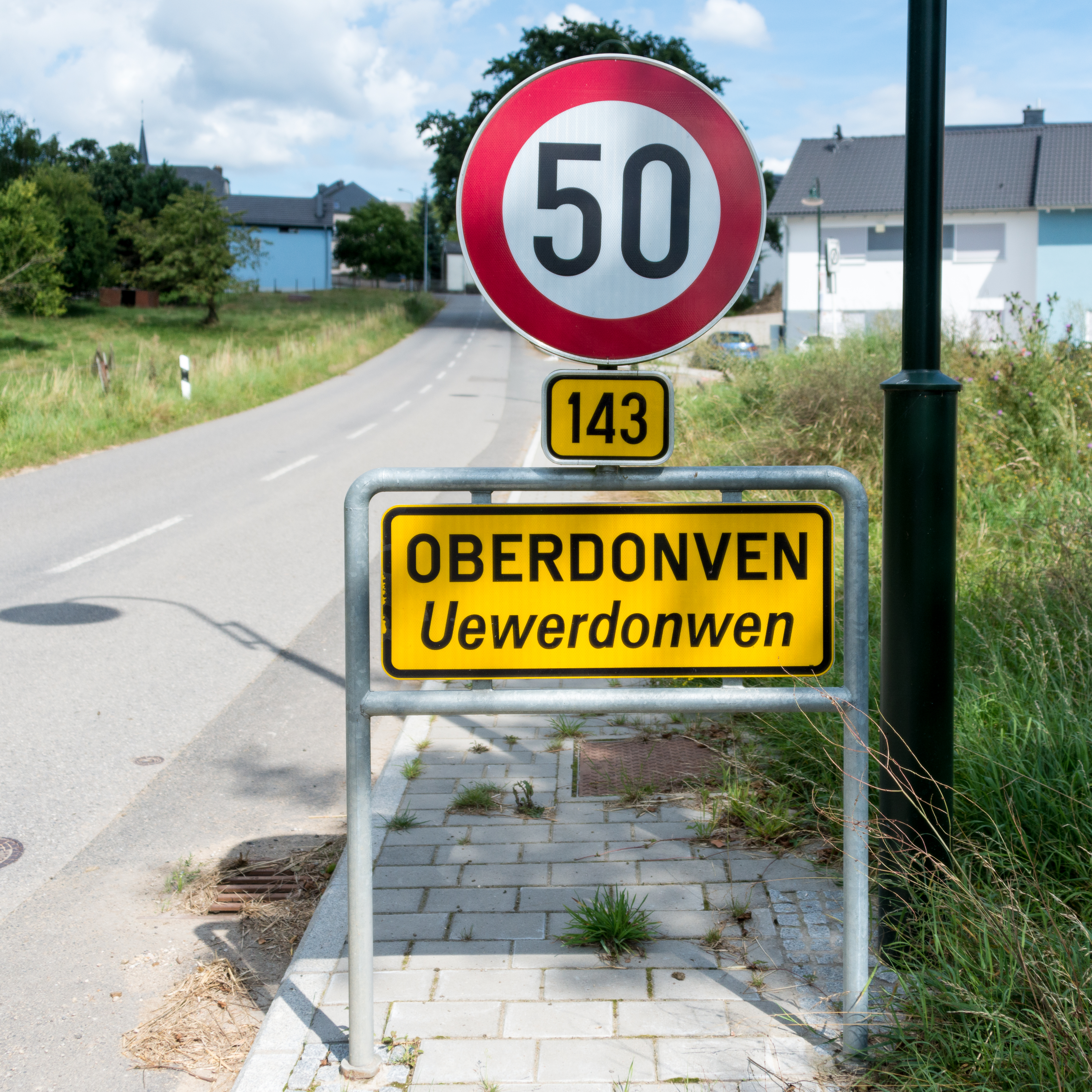

Oberdonven (Luxembourgish: Uewerdonwen) is a village in the commune of Flaxweiler, in south-eastern Luxembourg. As of September 2026, the village had a population of 233.
