= Cholera epidemics in Luxembourg =

The first major cholera outbreak in Luxembourg was in 1827, with further outbreaks in 1832, 1849, 1854 and 1865. Due to population growth, poverty and poor hygiene conditions, outbreaks were relatively frequent in Luxembourg in the 19th century.

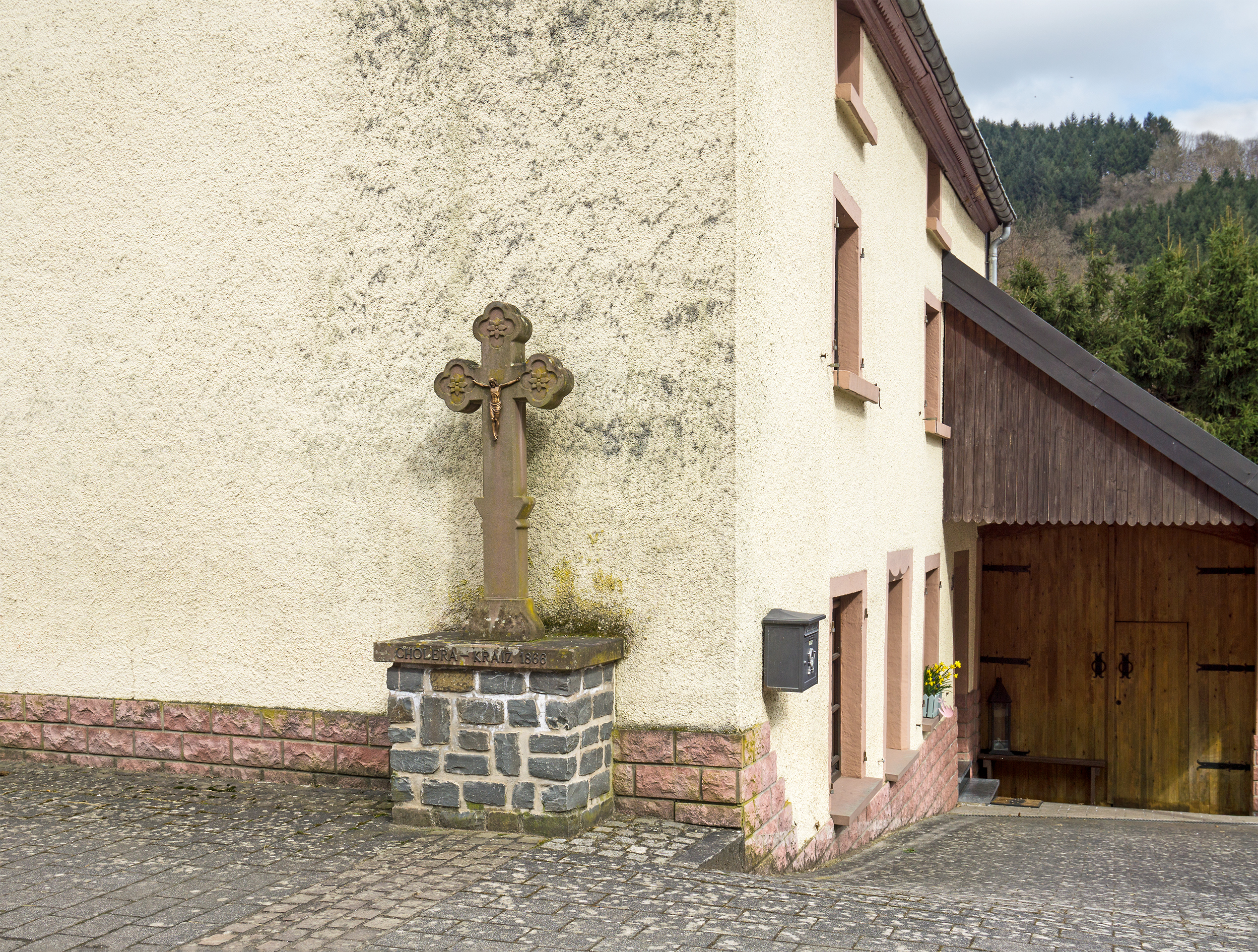
Wayside cross (cholera cross), 1866, in Stolzembourg, north-eastern Luxembourg, to remember the cholera epidemic

Cholera was evidently a common enough fact of life in Luxembourg at one point for the witticism "Schnaps ass gudd géint d'Cholera" — "Liquor works well against cholera" — to enter common parlance.

The outbreak of 1866 was the last in the country. The various instances of cholera in the 19th century left several physical reminders in Luxembourg in the form of chapels and wayside crosses, as a memorial to the many victims.

== Origins ==
Originating from Asia, cholera entered Europe through the Caspian Sea or the Mediterranean, arriving either through France, with Marseille as the gateway, or through the German ports of the Baltic and the North Sea.

Cholera outbreaks were doubly spectacular, both in terms of the number of victims and the suddenness of the attacks and their resolution. A person who was healthy one day could die of cholera the next. Recovery could be just as sudden, with the dying person suddenly regaining strength.

The first cholera pandemic occurred in the Bengal region of India, near Calcutta (now Kolkata), starting in 1817 through 1824. The disease dispersed from India to Southeast Asia, the Middle East, Europe, and Eastern Africa through trade routes. The second pandemic lasted from 1826 to 1837 and particularly affected North America and Europe, due to the result of advancements in transportation and global trade, and increased human migration, including soldiers. The third pandemic erupted in 1846, persisted until 1860, extended to North Africa, and reached South America, for the first time specifically affecting Brazil. The fourth pandemic lasted from 1863 to 1875, and spread from India to Naples and Spain, and to the United States in 1873.

== Outbreaks ==
The first appearance of cholera in Luxembourg was in August 1827, with victims mainly in the city of Luxembourg.

=== 1832 ===
The second appearance was in 1832, spreading across Europe from Russia and Germany, causing about 20,000 deaths in Paris alone. The centre of the epidemic was in Luxembourg City, particularly the Grund quarter and the nearby communes of Eich and Hollerich, that is the areas with a poorer population. Outside the capital and its environs, there were 29 deaths in Habay-la-Neuve, 8 in Remich and 7 in Dudelange.

=== 1849 ===
The third epidemic occurred in 1849, with less virulence, mainly affecting the Moselle region, Echternach, and for unknown reasons, the village of Crauthem.

=== 1854 ===
The year 1854, marked by famine, was also afflicted by cholera originating from Denmark and Northern Germany. Cases first appeared in August in Bertrange, followed by 70 deaths in Bissen. Arlon was particularly affected, with 138 victims in a population of 5,000. The epidemic ended in October.

Similar to the 1832 epidemic in Luxembourg, the poorest neighborhoods of Arlon, around Hetschegas, with narrow and not always well cleaned streets, were the epicenter of the disease.

The origin of cholera was unknown, but a sophisticated name was given to the unknown: the "deleterious miasma". Various remedies were suggested, including juniper cure, intensive tobacco use among military personnel, and large fires in the streets and fumigations in rooms, all to combat "the miasma." When cholera devastated Bavaria in 1854, the priest Sébastien Kneip, renowned for fresh water cures, also recommended them against cholera, apparently with success. While fresh water applications did not harm the cholera vibrio, at least fresh water, or bodily cleanliness, reduced the risk of infection.

=== 1865-1866 ===
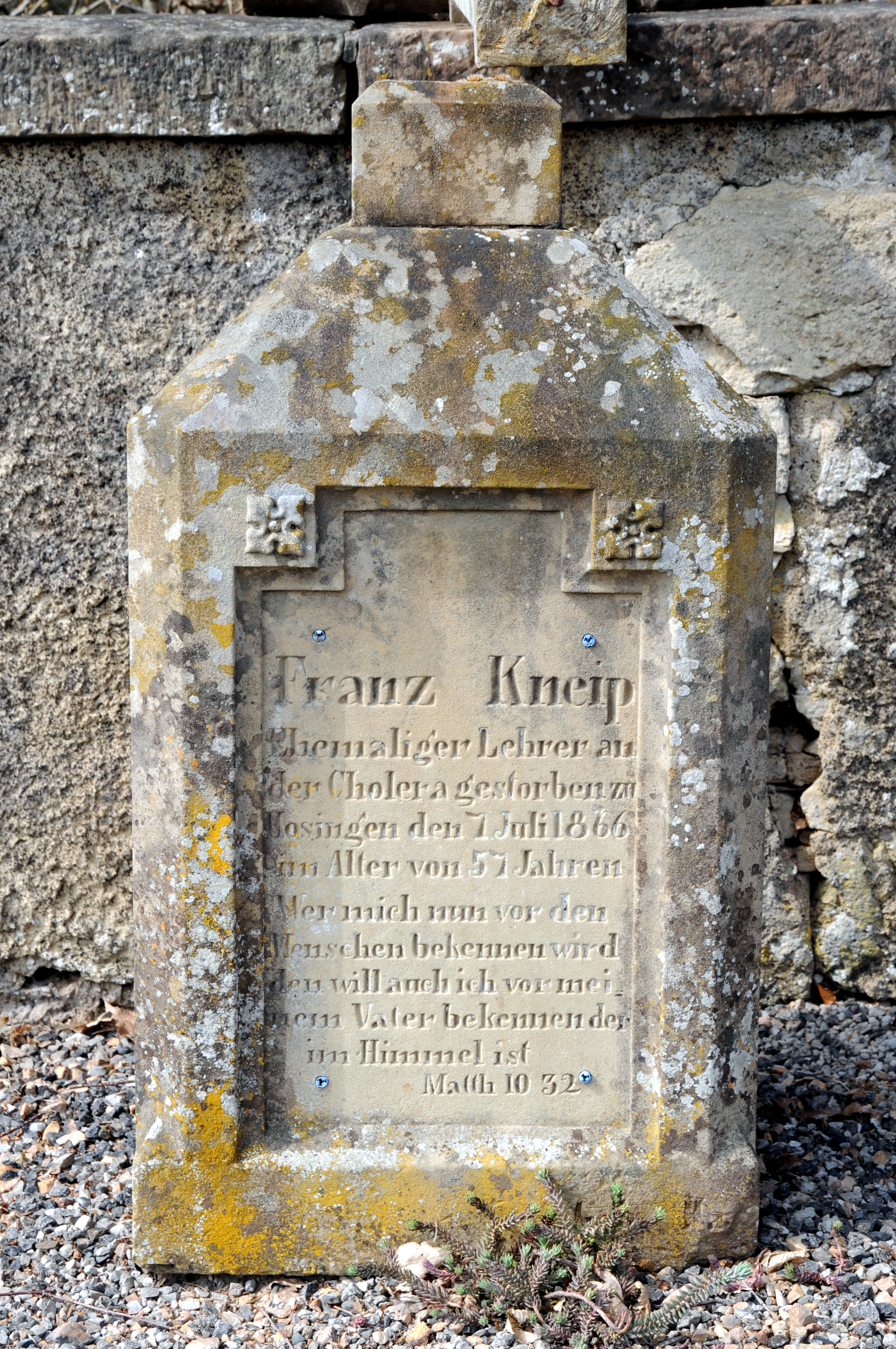
Gravestone of schoolteacher Franz Kneip, passed away 7 July 1866 of cholera in Hosingen, northern Luxembourg

The next outbreak occurred in 1865-1866.

==== Beginning ====
The first epidemic broke out in Mamer on 5 November 1865, and also shortly thereafter in Clemency. From then on, its progress was marked by macabre highpoints: it raged relentlessly in Eich, and the fortress of Luxembourg, as well as the small village of Gilsdorf. In Echternach, the second-biggest city of the country at the time, 100 people died of cholera within 2 months. Diekirch broke records, with 31 cholera deaths in one single day, and 252 during the epidemic.

In late April 1866, hopes were arising that the epidemic was fading away.

==== Second phase ====
These cautious hopes came to an end in June, when the epidemic started its second offensive. Wiltz, in the hitherto unharmed Oesling region, was now overwhelmed. It also spread like wildfire in the Moselle region. No community there was spared, with the most casualties in the town of Remich and the villages of Gostingen and Remerschen. Similarly, the cholera epidemic returned with a vengeance in Luxembourg city and its neighbouring areas. Esch, which had previously escaped major misfortune, saw many deaths.

==== End and aftermath ====
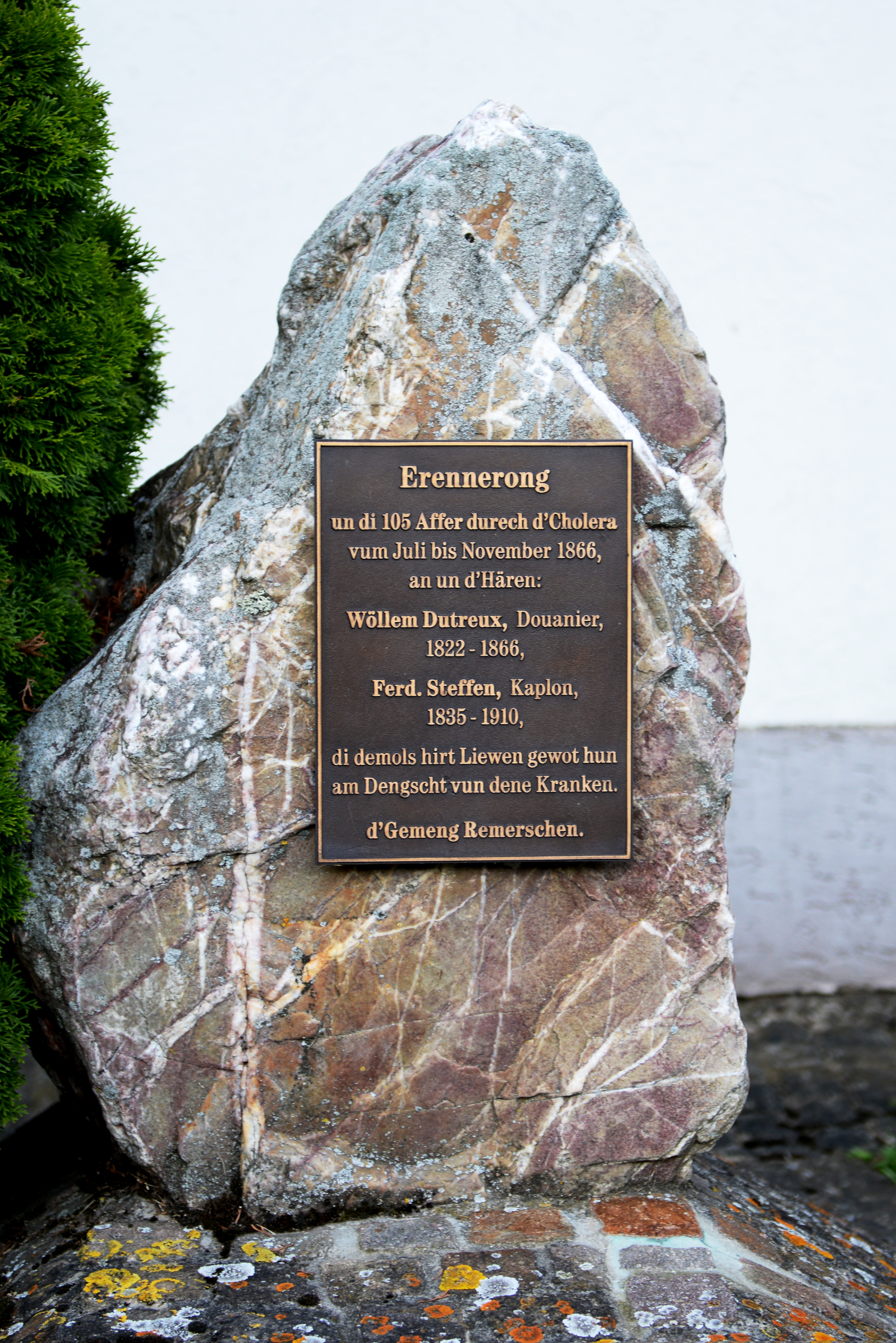
Memorial to 105 victims of cholera in 1866 in Remerschen, south-eastern Luxembourg

By November 1866, the grim episode was coming to an end, and by December it was definitely eradicated. Within a year, the disease had taken the lives of 3,500 Luxembourgers, about 1,8% of the population at the time. The total number of infected was around 8,000-10,000.

This outbreak left many chapels in the countryside as a testament to the disaster. Another relic was the Cholerasbrak, ("cholera shacks") which existed around 1900 on the Glacis of Luxembourg to serve as an isolation site. This was at the end of the Boulevard Emmanuel Servais, where the modern extensions of the Lycée Robert Schuman are now located; these were quarantine "shacks", erected in 1866, to shelter and isolate the cholera-infected a short distance away from the city; luckily they never had to be put to use for this purpose. Nor did the Villa Amberg, in the Municipal Park, which had similarly been turned into an isolation house in case of need.

== After 1866 ==
The epidemic of 1866 was the last in the country. Although its nature was still unknown, cholera now retreated in the face of progress in hygiene through bodily cleanliness and the construction of sewers and water pipes.

Finally, in 1883, Robert Koch isolated the cholera vibrio. It was revealed that the germs were found in the vomit and feces of the sick. Infection occurred either directly, especially through the soiled hands of doctors, nurses, and laundresses, or indirectly through the use of water contaminated by the excretions of cholera patients. Until then, precautions had been focused on the corpses of cholera victims, which had to be buried immediately and in tar-coated coffins.

== References and further reading ==
- Calmes, Albert (29 September 1954). "Le choléra en 1854". Luxemburger Wort (in French). p. 13.
- Dondelinger, Patrick (1 January 2008). "Le glacis de la forteresse de Luxembourg, lieu(e) de mémoire nationale". Hémecht (in French). 60 (1): 5–78.
- Hiltrud, Holzberger (1 October 1994). "Cholera und politische Verfolgung: Das verloren geglaubte Tagebuch des Mathias Wellenstein". Hémecht (in German). 46 (4): 699ff.
- Jung, J.P.A. (1 January 1981). "Die Choleraepidemie des Jahres 1854 in Berg, Colmar und Welsdorf". Hémecht (in German). 33 (1): 107ff.
- Massard, Jos. A. (1985). "Der Kanton Esch und die Cholera 1865/66". Galerie: revue culturelle et pédagogique (in German). 3 (1/2): 41–52, 207–218.
- Massard, Jos. A.; Geimer, Gaby (1997). "Luxemburg en de cholera 1832" (PDF). Geschiedenis der Geneeskunde (in Dutch). 4 (2): 118–125.
- Massard, Jos. A.; Geimer, Gaby (2000). "Das Großherzogtum Luxemburg und die asiatische Cholera um die Jahrhundertwende" (PDF). Scientiarum Historia (in German). 26 (1–2): 55–71.
- Ney, Marc (1 January 2002). "Les élections dans la ville de Luxembourg depuis la loi communale du 24 février 1843 (7ᵉ partie: de 1885-1894)". Hémecht (in French). 54 (1): 67ff.
- Pundel, J.-Paul; Beckius, Camille (1 October 1990). "La mortalité infantile et maternelle à Wormeldange dans les années 1752 à 1895". Hémecht (in French). 42 (4): 541ff.
