= Beidweiler =

Village in Grevenmacher canton, Luxembourg

Coordinates: 49°43′N 6°18′E

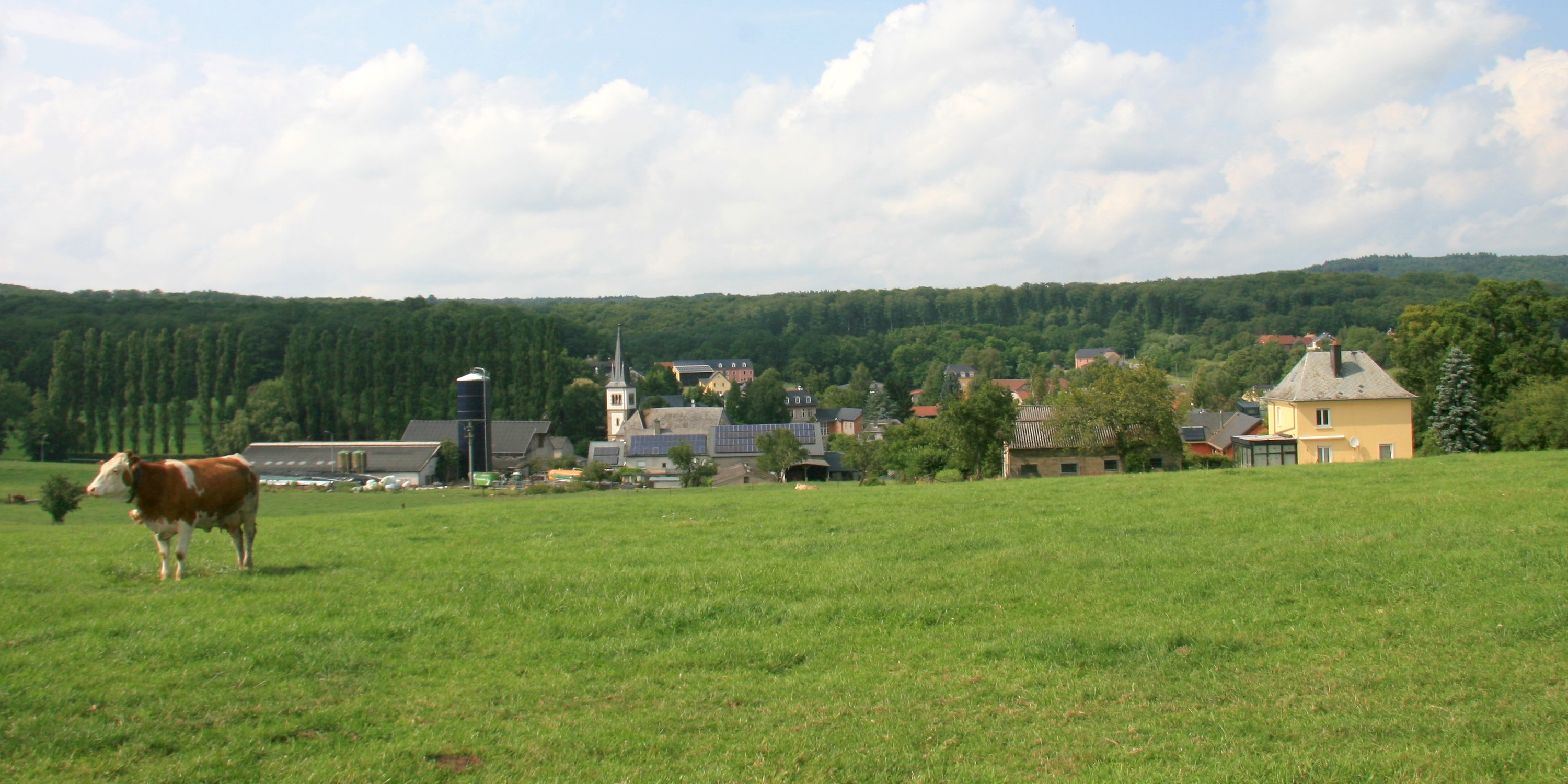
View of Beidweiler

Beidweiler (German pronunciation: [ˈbaɪtvaɪlɐ]; Luxembourgish: Beidler) is a village in the commune of Junglinster, in central Luxembourg. As of September 2026, the village has a population of 325.

Beidweiler's goes back to at least 930, at which point there was already a parish of the same name, served by priests from the Abbey of Echternach. Until the French Revolution, which saw the dissolution of the abbey, the parish maintained close ties with Echternach, although Beidweiler then belonged partially to the House of Meysembourg. To this end, the priest of Beidweiler was obliged to deliver two setiers of wine to the Castle of Meysembourg per year, implying that there may have been vineyards in the village during this period (ca. 1450).

Beidweiler was the site of the 2000 kilowatt-transmitter for transmitting the French-speaking programme of RTL, which ceased operating on 2 January 2023. The transmitter masts were demolished in a controlled explosion on 6 November 2026.
