= Imbringen =

Commune in Luxemburg

Coordinates: 49°42′N 6°12′E

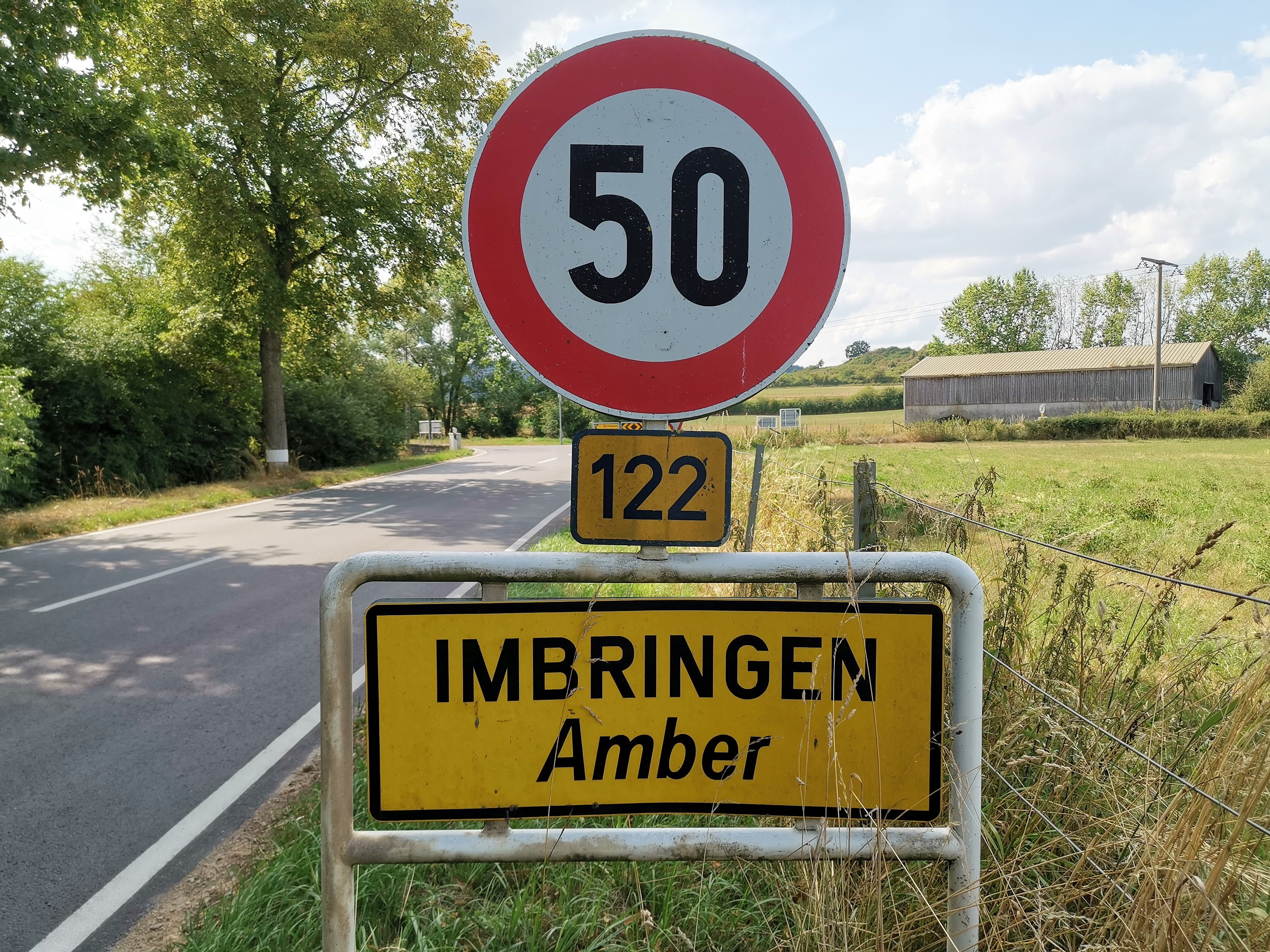
Luxembourg, Imbringen/Amber location sign.

Imbringen (German pronunciation: [ˈɪmbʁɪŋən]; Luxembourgish: Amber) is a village in the commune of Junglinster, in central Luxembourg.

As of September 2026 it has population of 414 inhabitants.
