= Wecker (surname) =

Wecker is a surname. Notable people with the surname include:

- Andreas Wecker (born 1970), German Olympic gymnast
- David Wecker, American radio host and newspaper columnist
- Georg Caspar Wecker (c. 1632–1695), German Baroque organist and composer
- Helene Wecker (born 1975), American writer, Mythopoeic Award-winner for historical fantasy
- Johannes Jacob Wecker (1528–1586), Swiss physician
- Kendra Wecker (born 1982), American basketball player
- Konstantin Wecker (born 1947), German singer and songwriter
- Louis de Wecker (1832–1906), French ophthalmologist
- William Booth Wecker (1892–1969), American entertainer, showman, and army veteran
