= Wecker, Luxembourg =

Coordinates: 49°41′N 6°23′E

Wecker (German pronunciation: [ˈvɛkɐ]) is a small town in the commune of Biwer, in eastern Luxembourg. It is located on banks of the Syr. As of September 2026, the town had a population of 229. The largest employer is the tool factory Proxxon S.A.
