= Gonderange =

Town in Junglinster, Luxembourg

Coordinates: 49°41′30″N 6°14′57″E

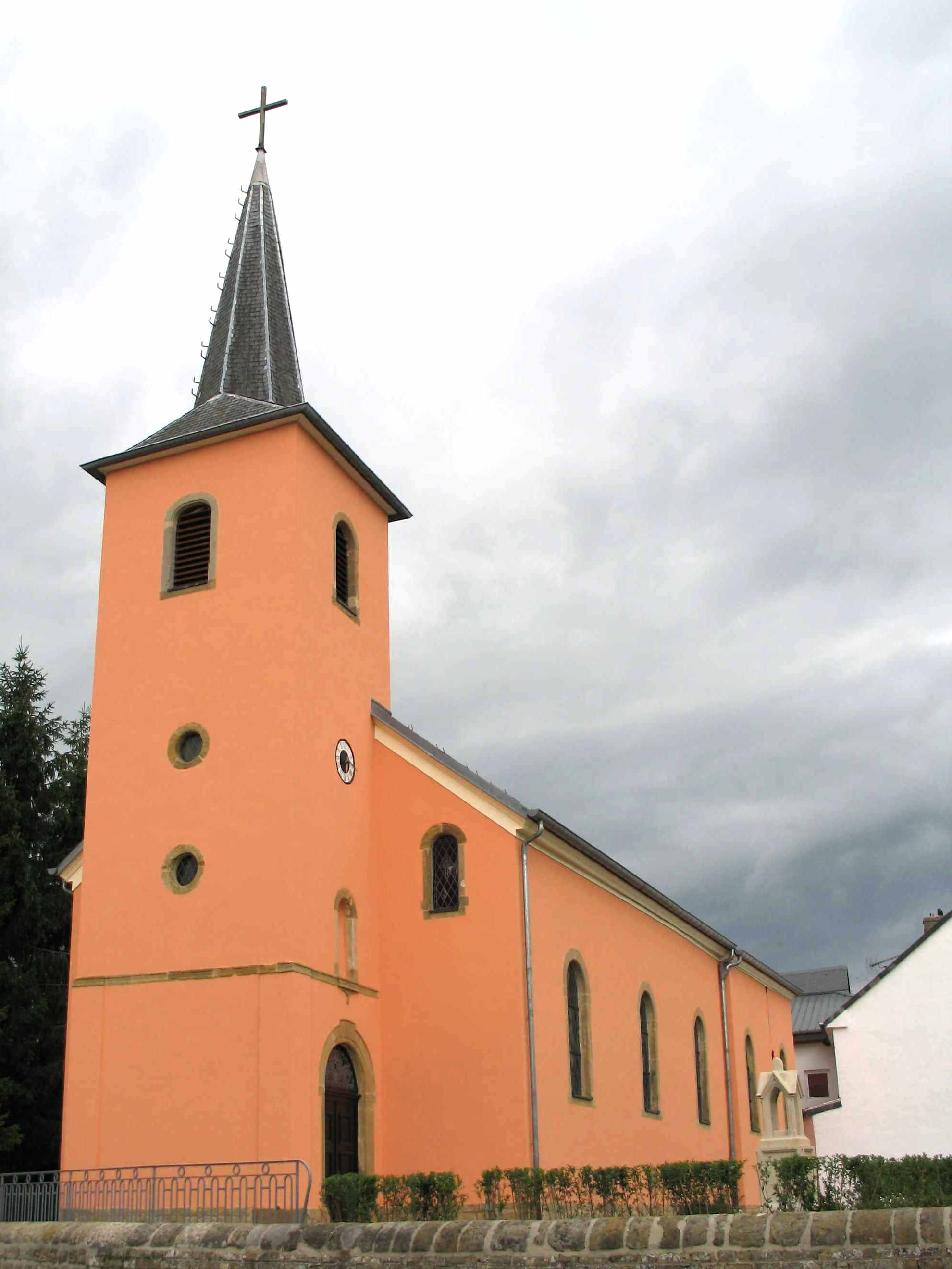
The parish church of Gonderange

Gonderange (French pronunciation: [ɡɔ̃dʁɑ̃ʒ]; Luxembourgish: Gonnereng; German: Gonderingen [ˈɡɔndəʁɪŋən]) is a town in the commune of Junglinster, in central Luxembourg. As of September 2026, the town has a population of 2,066 inhabitants.

Cyclist Franz Neuens, who competed at the 1936 Summer Olympics, was born here.
