= Altlinster =

Coordinates: 49°43′N 6°13′E

View of Altlinster from Dännebierg hill

Altlinster (Luxembourgish: Allënster) is a village in the commune of Junglinster, in central Luxembourg. As of September 2026, it has a population of 156 inhabitants.
