= Lake Stemper =

Lake in the state of Florida, United States

- Location within Florida
- Location: Hillsborough County, Florida
- Coordinates: 28.1336797°N 82.4561768°W
- Type: lake

Lake Stemper is a lake in Hillsborough County, Florida, in the United States.

Lake Stemper was named for Father Francis Xavier Augustus Stemper, a Catholic priest who oversaw a local mission.
