= Flaxweiler =

Flaxweiler Fluessweiler (Luxembourgish)
- Commune
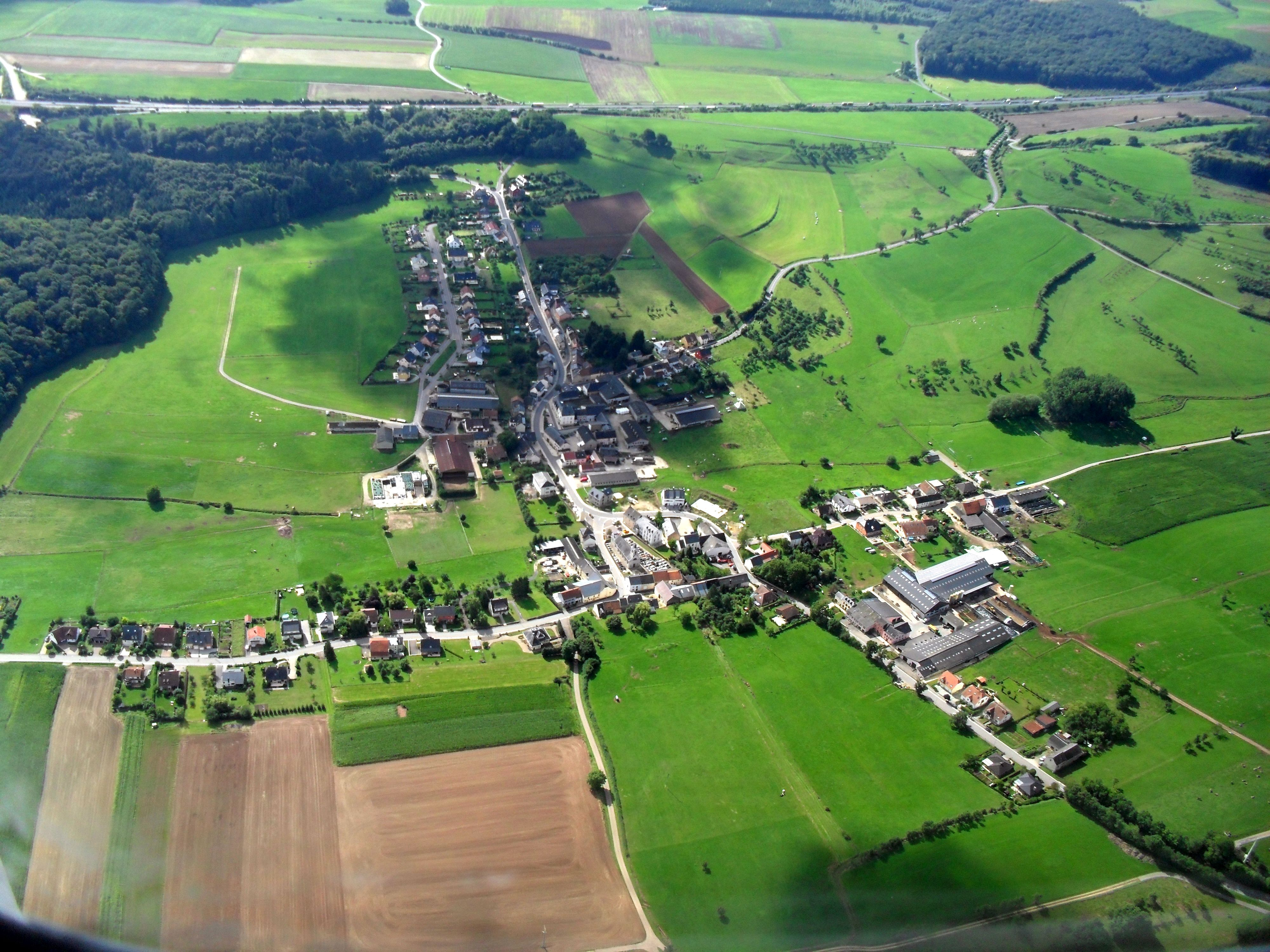

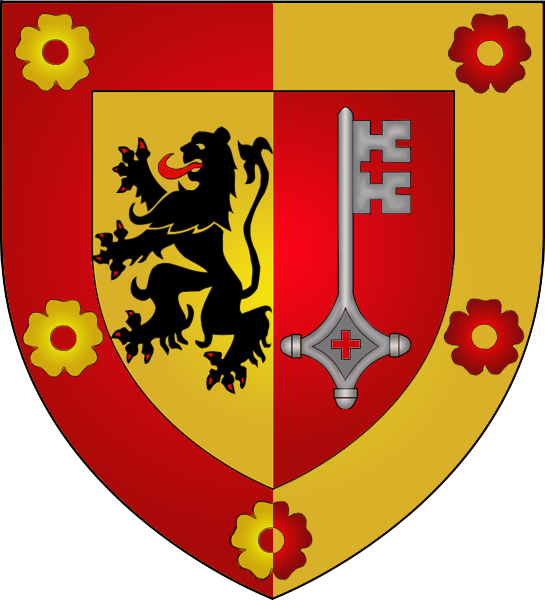
- Coat of arms

- Map of Luxembourg with Flaxweiler highlighted in orange, and the canton in dark red
- Coordinates: 49.6653°N 6.3431°E
- Country: Luxembourg
- Canton: Grevenmacher

Government
  - Mayor: Paul Ruppert

Area
  - Total: 30.17 km^{2} (11.65 sq mi)
  - Rank: 26th of 100
- Highest elevation: 387 m (1,270 ft)
  - Rank: 63rd of 100
- Lowest elevation: 208 m (682 ft)
  - Rank: 28th of 100

Population (2025)
  - Total: 2,281
  - Rank: 78th of 100
  - Density: 75.60/km^{2} (195.8/sq mi)
  - Rank: 80th of 100
- Time zone: UTC+1 (CET)
  - Summer (DST): UTC+2 (CEST)
- LAU 2: LU0001103
- Website: flaxweiler.lu

Flaxweiler (German pronunciation: [ˈflaksˌvaɪlɐ]; Luxembourgish: Fluessweiler) is a commune and small town in south-eastern Luxembourg. It is part of the canton of Grevenmacher.

As of September 2026, the town of Flaxweiler, which lies in the north-west of the commune, has a population of 587. Other towns within the commune include Beyren, Gostingen, Niederdonven, and Oberdonven.

== Population ==
Historical population

Year	Pop.	±%
1821	1,347	—
1851	2,215	+64.4%
1900	1,750	−21.0%
1910	1,739	−0.6%
1922	1,655	−4.8%
1935	1,549	−6.4%

Year	Pop.	±%
1947	1,397	−9.8%
1960	1,265	−9.4%
1970	1,163	−8.1%
1981	1,077	−7.4%
1990	1,087	+0.9%
2000	1,409	+29.6%

Year	Pop.	±%
2005	1,609	+14.2%
2010	1,725	+7.2%
2015	1,890	+9.6%
2020	2,148	+13.7%
2021	2,158	+0.5%

Source data

== List of Mayors ==
Name	Start	End
Michel Metzdorf	1806	1810
Pierre Stemper	1810	1812
Jean Nielles	1813	1816
François Strasser	1816	1819
Jean Huberty	1819	1825
Jean Peters (first time)	1825	1830
Michel Pettinger (first time)	1830	1839
Jean Peters (second time)	1840	1848
Michel Pettinger (second time)	1848	1854
Jean-Pierre Huberty	1854	1867
Michel Engel	1867	1876
Antoine Boss	1876	1887
Adolphe Musquar	1889	1895
Jean Molitor	1895	1928
Michel Schritz	1929	1944 (Note: Mayor in name only under Nazi occupation (1940 - 1944))
Jean Sturm	1945	1945
Edouard Steffes	1946	1965
Eugène Kauffmann	1966	1970
Roger Lenert	1970	2005
Théo Weirich	2005	2017
Roger Barthelmy	2017	2023
Paul Ruppert	2023	present
