= Canton of Grevenmacher =

Canton of Grevenmacher Kanton Gréiwemaacher (Luxembourgish) Kanton Grevenmacher (German)
- Canton
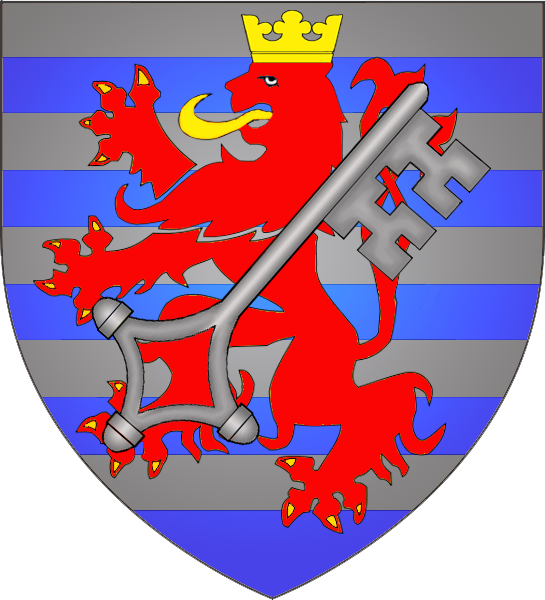
- Coat of arms

- Coordinates: 49°36′N 6°24′E
- Country: Luxembourg
- Legislative constituency: Est
- LAU 1: LU00011
- Communes (cities in bold): Betzdorf; Biwer; Flaxweiler; Grevenmacher; Junglinster; Manternach; Mertert; Wormeldange

Area
  - Total: 211.4 km^{2} (81.6 sq mi)
  - Rank: 7th of 12
- Highest elevation (10th of 12): 411 m (1,348 ft)
- Lowest elevation (1st of 12): 132 m (433 ft)

Population (2026)
  - Total: 34,007
  - Rank: 6th of 12
  - Density: 160.9/km^{2} (416.6/sq mi)
  - Rank: 7th of 12

Grevenmacher (Luxembourgish: Gréiwemaacher) is a canton in the east of Luxembourg. The canton's name derives from Grevenmacher, a commune with town status. Neither the canton, town, or commune of Grevenmacher should be confused with the former district of Grevenmacher, one of three administrative units in Luxembourg abolished in October 2015. It borders Germany.

== Administrative divisions ==
Grevenmacher Canton consists of the following eight communes:

- Betzdorf
- Biwer
- Flaxweiler
- Grevenmacher
- Junglinster
- Manternach
- Mertert
- Wormeldange

== History ==
After Luxembourg’s defeat by the armies of the French Revolution, on 31 August 1795, the Committee for Public Safety divided Luxembourg into 37 cantons. These included the canton of Grevenmacher, whose territory extended over both sides of the Moselle river. On the right bank, it encompassed the lands of the old duchy of Luxembourg from Igel (near Trier) to Wincheringen, near Wormeldange. On the left bank, Grevenmacher canton included the communes of Berbourg, Biwer, Manternach, Mertert and Grevenmacher.

At this time, the Moselle region did not form an arrondissement, as the cantons which would later form this district (Grevenmacher, Betzdorf and Remich) belonged to the arrondissement of Luxembourg, while Echternach canton belonged to that of Diekirch. At the end of the Napoleonic era, due to the decisions of the Vienna Congress, Luxembourg lost its possessions east of the Moselle: this river now became a national border. The canton of Grevenmacher lost half its territory, which now became part of the Prussian Rhineland.

In 1822-1823 the Dutch king William I changed the administrative divisions of the Grand-Duchy by creating 8 arrondissements, later called districts. This included a district of Grevenmacher, made up of the cantons of Echternach, Grevenmacher, Betzdorf and Remich. This was the situation at the time of the third partition of Luxembourg in 1839.

At this time and by virtue of the decrees of 1822 and 1823, Grevenmacher was one of the 7 recognised cities recognised as such in the territory of the current Grand Duchy. With 2,254 inhabitants in 1839, Grevenmacher had, as industries, 3 playing cards factories, one oil mill, and 5 tanneries.

But Grevenmacher was primarily a trading centre for grain, wine and livestock as well as a transit centre for travel by road and river. The city was located at the junction of the Moselle and the road from Luxembourg to Trier, which was also the military route that connected the Prussian garrison in Luxembourg City with the Prussian Rhineland. The products of the iron foundries flowed through Grevenmacher.

And when, in the mid-19^{th} century, minette started to be mined, processed and exported, the minette was expedited via the Moselle and Saar rivers toward factories in Quint, near Trier, Sankt Ingbert, in the Palatinate, and Neunkirchen and Bürbach, in Sarre. The ships were loaded in the 4 river ports of Wasserbillig, Grevenmacher, Ehnen and Stadtbredimus. The foundries of Eich and of Septfontaines preferred to use the port of Ehnen. On 2 May 1855, an ore depot with a loading dock of 130 metres was built there. It was used to load alluvial ore from Itzig and minette. The foundries of Fischbach and Berbourg mostly used the port of Grevenmacher, whereas the foundry of Grundhof loaded its products onto barges which descended the Sauer river, and whose cargo was crossloaded in Wasserbillig. As to the return freight, that is the exports from the Rhineland to Luxembourg, this was assured from when the export of coal from the Saar to Luxembourgish foundries became significant; in other words, when coal (linked to minette production) supplanted charcoal (linked to alluvial ore).

After the partition of 1839, which took two thirds of the Grand Duchy’s territory and half its population, the cantons were re-examined, including those of Grevenmacher and Betzdorf. The former, with 4 communes (Grevenmacher, Biwer, Manternach and Mertert), had 5256 inhabitants. The latter, with 5 communes (Betzdorf, Flaxweiler, Junglinster, Rodenbourg and Wormeldange), had 8,168. The country now had a population of 180,000 habitants, which were divided up among 11 cantons; the 12th, the canton of Vianden, had been abolished. This gave an average of 16,000 inhabitants per canton. These two cantons were therefore too small and had to be merged. The administrative centre was placed in the region’s only city: Grevenmacher. Thus, the decree of 12 October 1841 created the canton of Grevenmacher, as it now exists, with the 9 communes mentioned above.

== Mergers ==
- On 1 January 1979 the former commune of Rodenbourg (from Grevenmacher Canton) was absorbed into the commune of Junglinster. The law expanding Junglinster was passed on 23 December 1978.

== Population ==
Historical population

Year	Pop.	±%
1821	11,096	—
1851	16,071	+44.8%
1900	15,507	−3.5%
1910	16,162	+4.2%
1922	15,160	−6.2%
1935	15,413	+1.7%

Year	Pop.	±%
1947	14,446	−6.3%
1960	14,647	+1.4%
1970	15,269	+4.2%
1981	16,403	+7.4%
1990	17,993	+9.7%
2000	21,279	+18.3%

Year	Pop.	±%
2005	22,944	+7.8%
2010	24,969	+8.8%
2015	27,959	+12.0%
2020	30,887	+10.5%
2021	31,378	+1.6%

Source data
