= Gostingen, Luxembourg =

Village in Luxemburg

Coordinates: 49°37′N 6°21′E

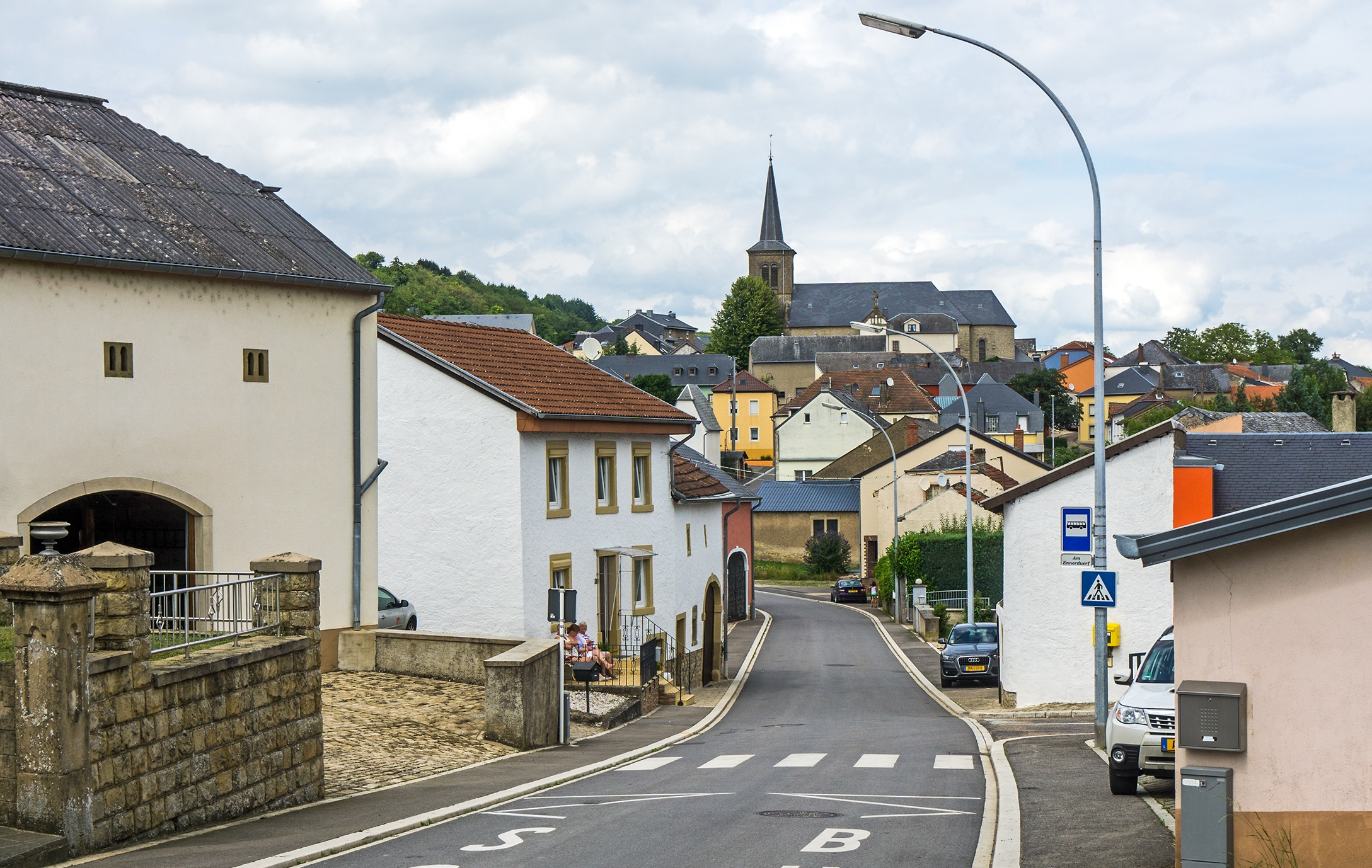
View of Gostingen (2016).

Gostingen (German pronunciation: [ˈɡɔstɪŋən]; Luxembourgish: Gouschteng) is a small town in the commune of Flaxweiler, in south-eastern Luxembourg.

== Demographics ==
As of September 2026, the town has a population of 562.
