= Eschweiler, Grevenmacher =

Village in central Luxembourg

Coordinates: 49.711°N 6.311°E

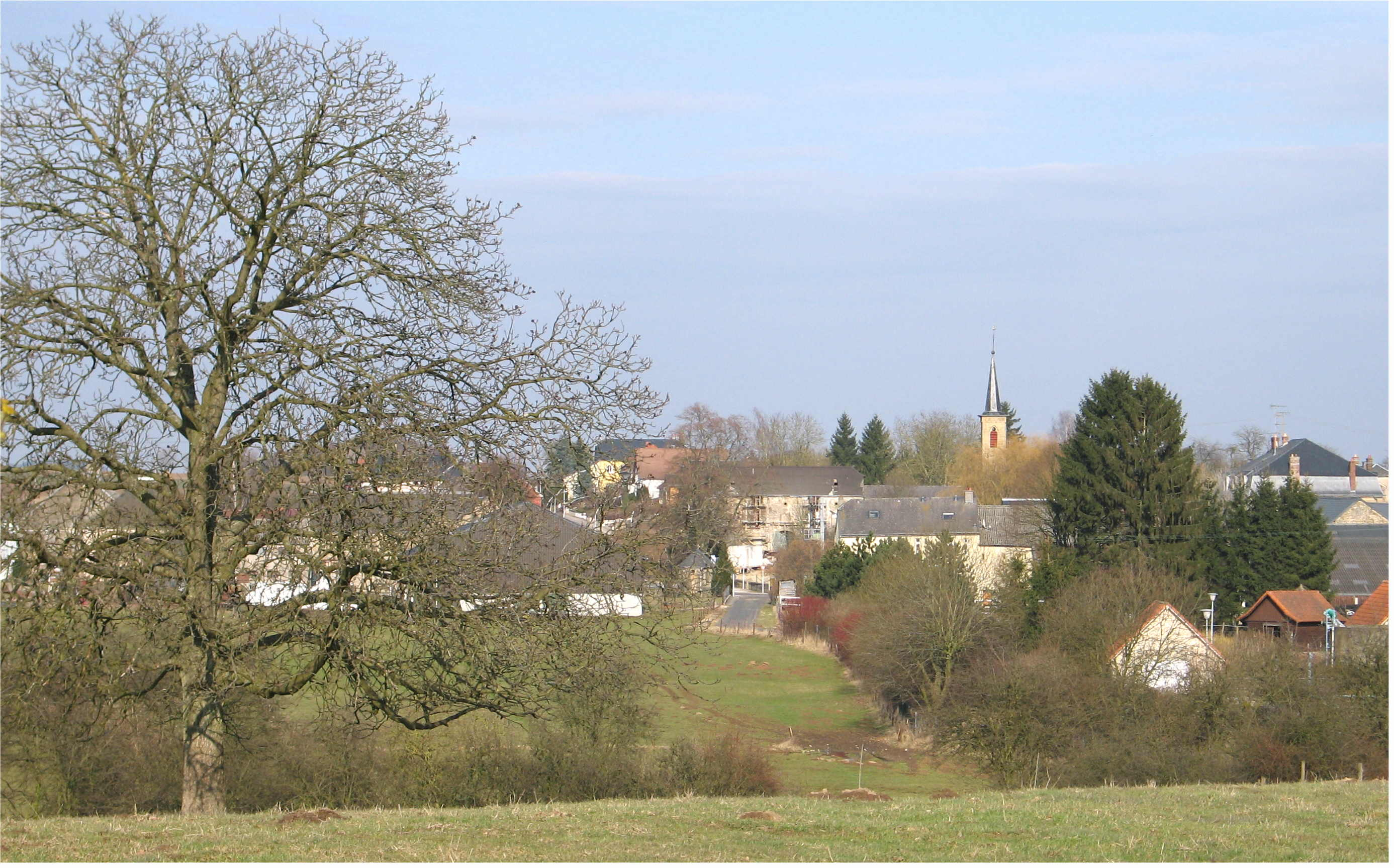
Eeschweller Landscape

Eschweiler (German pronunciation: [ˈɛʃvaɪlɐ]; Luxembourgish: Eeschweller) is a village in the commune of Junglinster, in central Luxembourg. As of September 2026, it had a population of 200.
