= Celtic Luxembourg =

Luxembourg between 600 BC and 100 AD

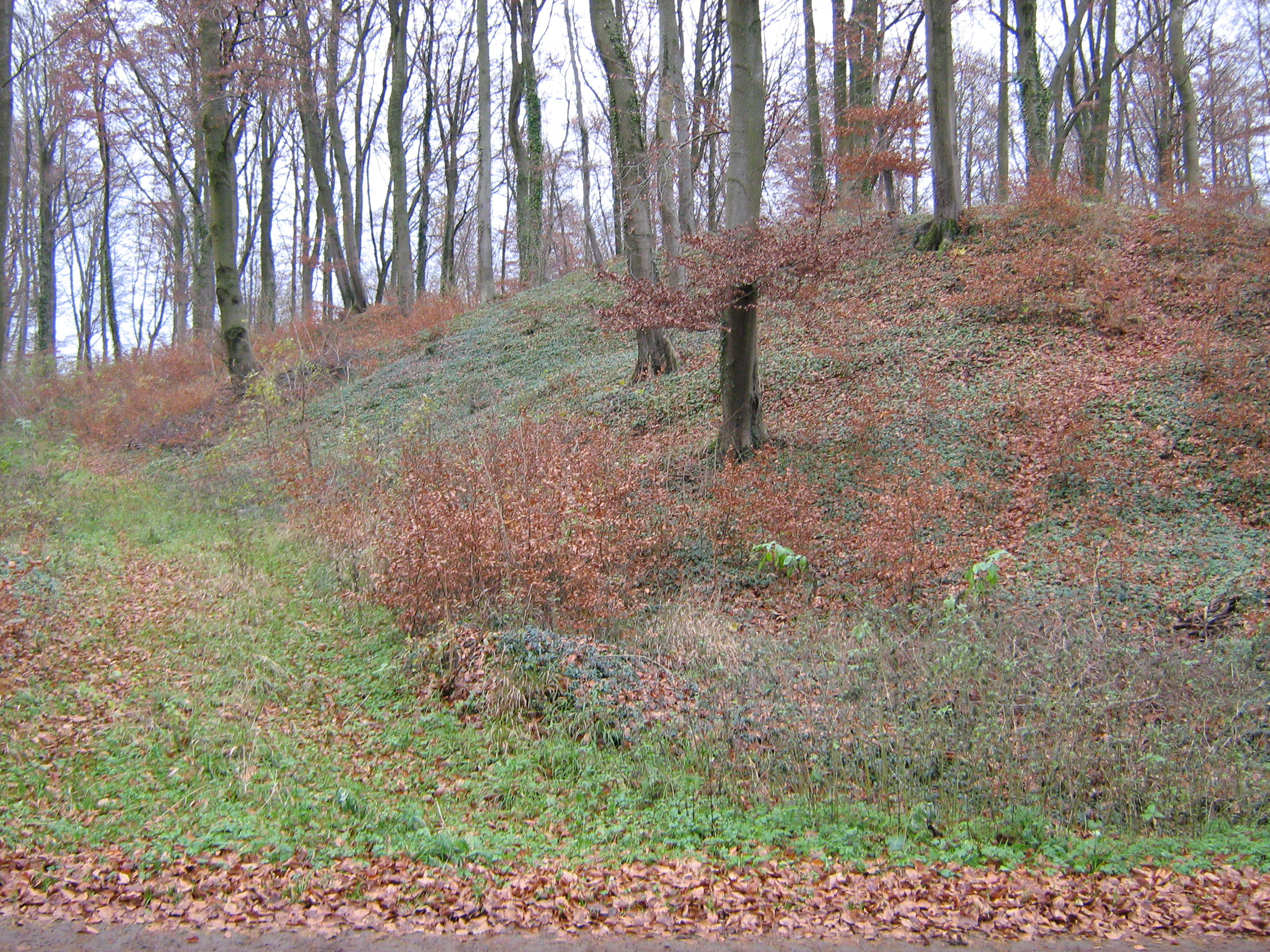
Titelberg, a Celtic oppidum: the ramparts

Celtic Luxembourg existed during the period from roughly 600 BC until 100 AD, when the Celts inhabited what is now the territory of the Grand Duchy of Luxembourg. Their culture was well developed, especially from the 1st century BC, as can be seen from the remains of the extensive Titelberg site in the far southwest of the country and from the impressive finds in several tombs and necropolises in the Moselle valley and its surroundings.

The Celts inhabited large areas of Europe from the Danube to the Rhine and Rhône during the 6th to 1st centuries BC, a period sometimes referred to as La Tène after a site in Switzerland where Celtic remains were discovered in 1857. It was around 100 BC that the Treveri, one of the Celtic tribes, entered a period of prosperity. They constructed a number of fortified settlements or oppida near the Moselle valley in what is now southern Luxembourg, western Germany and eastern France.

== Early inhabitants ==
In the territory now covered by the Grand Duchy of Luxembourg, there is evidence of primitive inhabitants right back to the Paleolithic or Old Stone Age over 35,000 years ago. The oldest artifacts from this period are decorated bones found at Oetrange.

However, the first real evidence of civilization is from the Neolithic or 5th millennium BC when houses began to appear. Traces have been found in the south of Luxembourg at Aspelt, Weiler-la-Tour, as well as at Grevenmacher and Diekirch. The dwellings were made of a combination of tree trunks for the basic structure, mud-clad wickerwork walls, and roofs of thatched reeds or straw. Pottery from this period has been found near Remerschen.

While there is not much evidence of communities in Luxembourg at the beginning of the Bronze Age, a number of sites dating back to the period between the 13th and the 8th centuries BC provide evidence of dwellings and reveal artifacts such as pottery, knives and jewelry. These include Nospelt, Dalheim, Mompach and Remerschen.

== The Hallstatt culture ==
The discovery in 1846 of a prehistoric cemetery at Hallstatt in Austria revealed distinctive artifacts from the Neolithic through to the early Iron Age from 600 to 450 BC. These are considered to be the first evidence of Celtic civilization and served as a model for similar finds which were to occur in other parts of Europe in areas inhabited by the Celts. In Luxembourg too, evidence of this early period comes mainly from fairly modest tombs such as those found in Niederanven. However, the tombs found in south-east Luxembourg at Grosbous, Flaxweiler and Altrier which date back to between 450 and 250 BC contained much richer finds.

Judging from the objects discovered at Altrier, the tomb from about 450 BC must have been that of a high-ranking chieftain. It contained a bronze Etruscan stamnos, an iron sword, an ornate bronze and coral fibula (brooch) and a gold bracelet. The Grosbous tomb, part of a small cemetery, is particularly interesting as the corpse had been placed on a two-wheeled chariot providing indications of how the Celts constructed such vehicles.

== Principal Celtic sites ==
The Celtic civilization was at its peak at around 300 BC, prior to the Roman conquest in 54 BC. Most of the evidence from that period has been discovered in tombs, many closely associated with Titelberg, a 50-ha site which reveals much about the dwellings and handicrafts of the period.

=== Titelberg ===
Titelberg is the site of a large Celtic settlement or oppidum in the extreme southwest of Luxembourg near Rodange and Differdange. Though it had been inhabited from about 300 BC, by the 1st century BC, the community had reached a high level of urbanization and was almost certainly the capital of the Treveri people. It was by far the largest of the Treveri settlements at the time, no doubt as a result of its proximity to two of the most important Celtic roads, one from the south connecting the Rhône to the Moselle valley and the north, the other leading to Reims and the west. Another attraction was the iron ore which could be mined in the immediate vicinity and was indeed increasingly smelted to produce knives, lances, swords and cooking utensils and equipment.

Covering an area of some 50 ha, the oval-shaped Titelberg plateau rising 100 m above the river Chiers is approximately 1 km long (NW to SE) and 500 m wide. Evidence of the foundations of numerous dwellings, a public space for religious or political purposes, and the 9-m high ramparts which still stand at the SW entrance today, clearly demonstrate the importance of the oppidum which, until the Roman conquest, appears to have been the seat of the Treveri chieftains.

One of the most important finds on Titelberg has been a huge number of Celtic coins which come from not only the Treveri themselves but also several other Celtic tribes, indicating that this had become a centre of trade and commerce showing signs of urbanization. Facilities for minting coins have been excavated close to the residential area and appear to have been used over an extended period, both during the purely Celtic period and under the Romans as the Celts began to adopt Roman culture.

A very large number of both Celtic and Gallo-Roman fibulae have also been found on the site. In a multitude of different shapes and sizes, these bronze clasps, sometimes hinged, were used either as ornamental brooches or for pinning garments together.

Initially, the Romans converted the Celtic dwellings to houses with stone foundations. But towards the end of the 1st century BC, the Romans established their centre of interest in Trier which also became the new capital for the Treveri. Indeed, the Romans dismantled the ramparts and reduced the oppidum to a vicus which nevertheless continued to be inhabited for another 400 years.

=== Clemency ===
A Celtic funeral chamber measuring 4.30 m by 4.20 m, the largest Gallic tomb ever found, was discovered in 1987 at Clemency. From the offerings in the tomb, it was obviously the burial place of a Celtic nobleman. These included at least ten wine amphorae, an Italic bronze basin, an oil lamp from Campania, an iron grill and some 30 Gallic pots. There was also a chimney from an iron smelter in the chamber testifying to the deceased's association with iron production.

=== Nospelt ===
Tombs excavated at Kreckelbierg, just north-west of the village of Nospelt, contain an impressive range of articles including wine flagons, articles of pottery, spurs, knives, lances and a lantern testifying to the nobility of those buried. It is thought the tombs might belong to chieftains from the Titelberg settlement. Some of the artefacts including a tall amphora came from as far away as the Mediterranean, showing the extent of trade with other regions at the time.

=== Kehlen ===
A necropolis from the 1st century was discovered in the early 1970s on the Juckelsboesch plateau between Mamer and Kehlen. A beautiful dark blue glass bowl was among the offerings found there.

=== Goeblange ===
In 1993, the National Museum of History and Art excavated Celtic tombs dating back to 50 BC to 30 BC which had been discovered in 1966 about 1 km NE of the Roman ruins in an area known as Scheierheck. The tombs were no doubt the resting place of aristocrats - four men and one woman - judging from the artifacts which were found there. These included: 1 amphoric wine flagon, 4 bottles, 7 plates, 5 pots, 7 bowls, 5 cups, 1 flat plate, 1 goblet, 1 drinking horn, 1 iron knife, 2 lance blades, 2 spurs, 3 bronze brooches, 1 pair of scissors and the remains of cremation, including those of a wild boar.

=== Feulen ===
The 133 tombs uncovered at Feulen in 1996 date from the 2nd century BC until Gallo-Roman times. They have revealed numerous fibulae, arms and tools made of iron, and a large collection of pottery including two amphorae.

== Crisis of the 3rd century BC ==
During the century from 250 to 150 BC, the area between the Rhine and the Meuse underwent a drastic restructuring as some crisis forced most signs of inhabitation into the heights of the Hunsrück. Following this crisis, population returned to the lowlands in the form of the Gaulish tribes known to us from classical texts.

== The Treveri ==
The Celtic tribe in what is now Luxembourg during and after the La Tène period was known as the Treveri. Though Celtic in language, they claimed to be descended from the Germans to bolster their warlike reputation. By and large, the Treveri were more successful than most Gallic tribes in cooperating with the Romans who completed their occupation in 53 BC under Julius Caesar. Two 1st-century AD revolts did not permanently damage their cordial relations with Rome, and the Treveri adapted readily to Roman civilisation.
