= Rizzigau =

In the early Middle Ages, the Rizzigau (Latin Recensis pagus, pagus Rizogohensis, pagus Rizzigowi) was a territory (Latin pagus, German gau) in the Ardennes Forest in what is today the Moselle department of France and Luxembourg. It corresponds to the ancient Roman vicus of Ricciacum, which has been variously identified with sites near Dalheim, Ritzing or Roussy. In the tenth century, the Rizzigau was the lower part of the county of Waldefinga along the river Moselle, including such towns as Thionville, Remich and Évrange. It is described as the "country of Ricciacum in the county [or country] of Waldefinga" (Recensis pagus in comitatus Waldelefinganno or Rezcensis pagus in pago Waldefinga).

== Sources ==
- Bouteiller, Ernest de. Dictionnaire topographique de l'ancien département de la Moselle comprenant les noms de lieu anciens et modernes. Paris: Imprimerie Nationale, 1874. (cf. p. 210)
