= Rippig =

Village in Bech, Luxembourg

Coordinates: 49°44′N 6°19′E

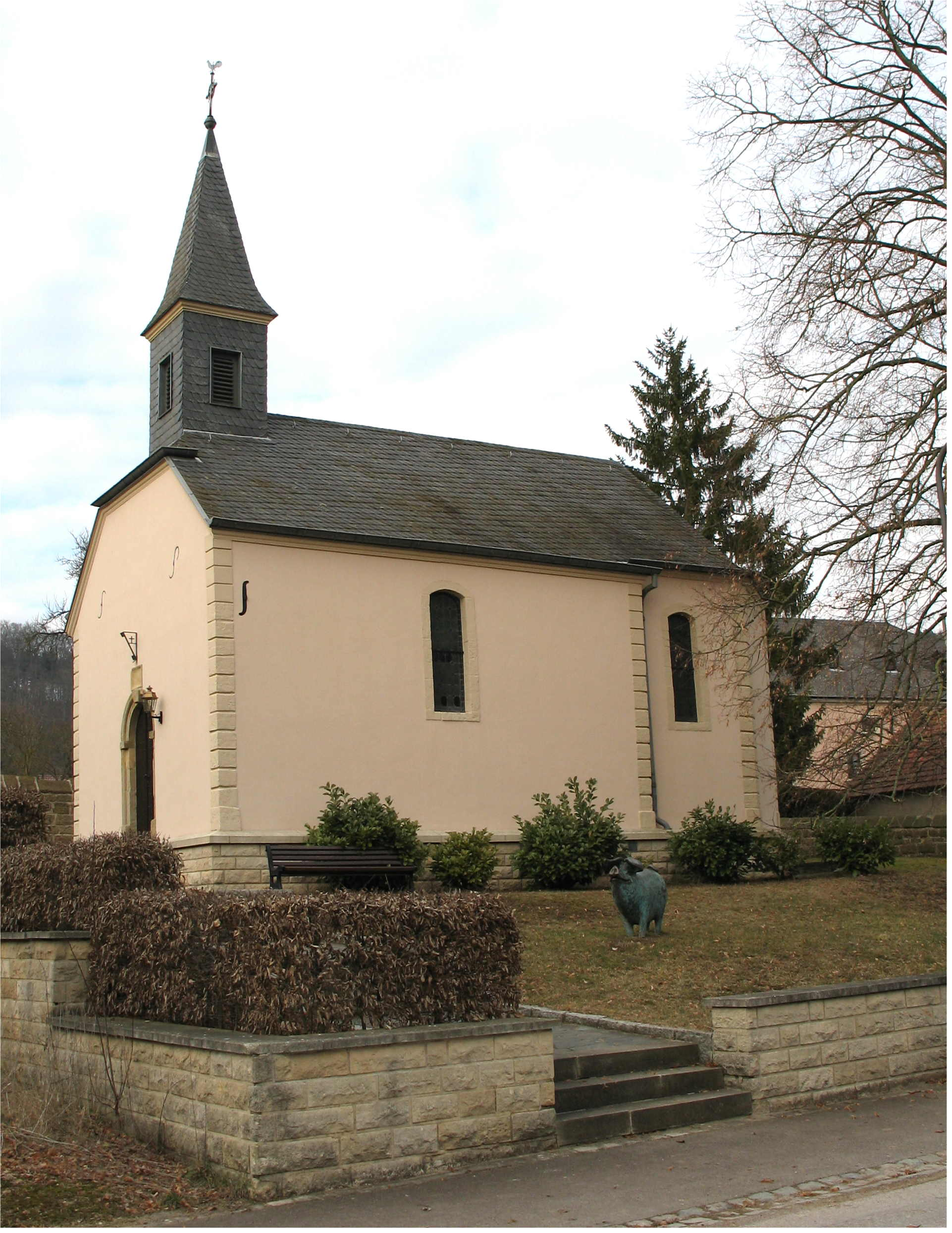
Church of Rippig

Rippig (German pronunciation: [ˈʁɪpɪç]; Luxembourgish: Rippeg) is a village in the commune of Bech, in eastern Luxembourg. As of September 2026, the village has a population of 153.
