= Bech =

- Commune
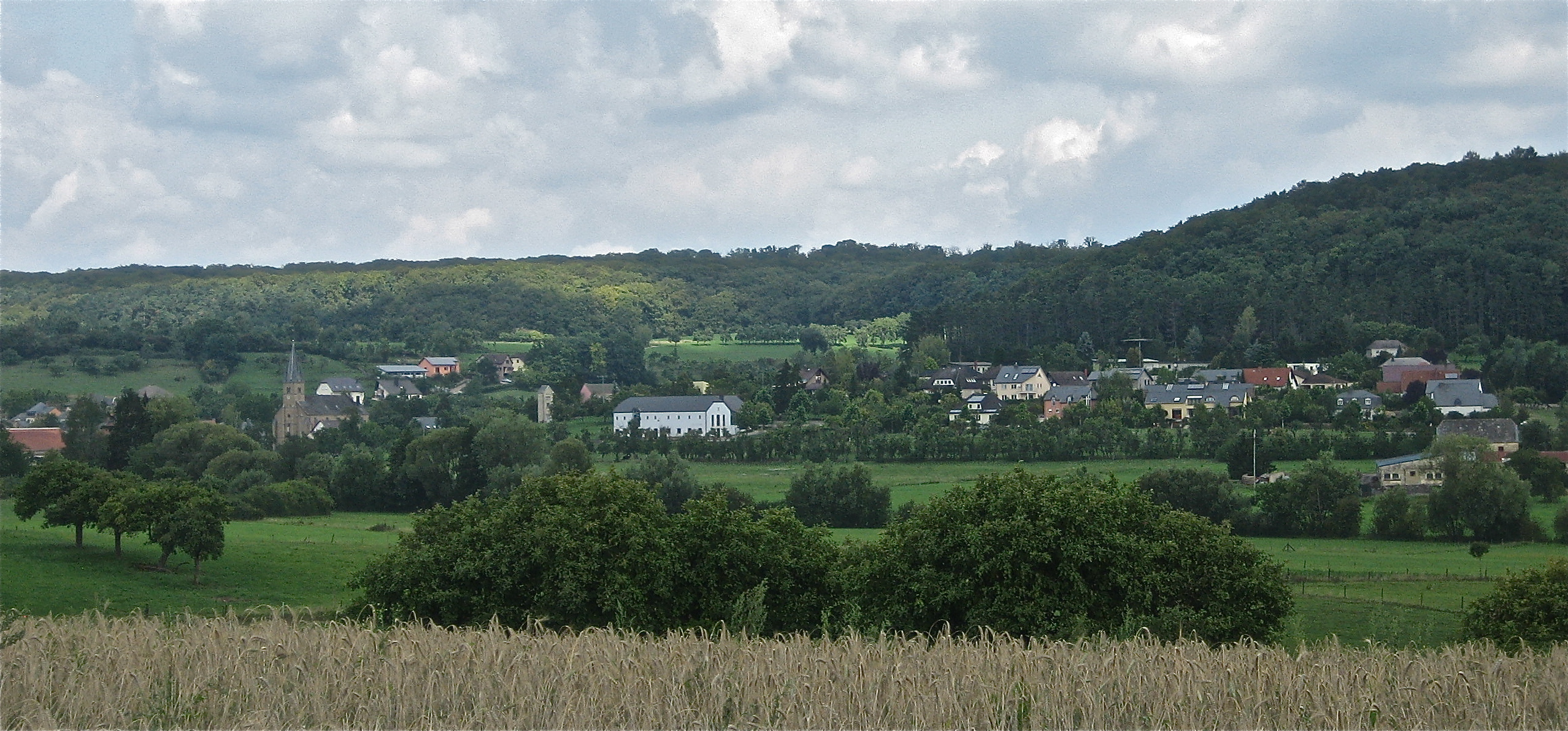

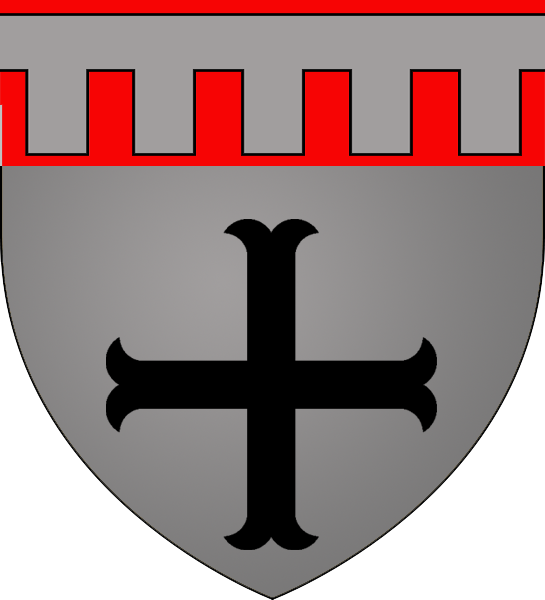
- Coat of arms

- Map of Luxembourg with Bech highlighted in orange, and the canton in dark red
- Coordinates: 49.7528°N 6.3611°E
- Country: Luxembourg
- Canton: Echternach

Government
  - Mayor: Max Pesch (Independent)

Area
  - Total: 23.31 km^{2} (9.00 sq mi)
  - Rank: 39th of 100
- Highest elevation: 408 m (1,339 ft)
  - Rank: 43rd of 100
- Lowest elevation: 261 m (856 ft)
  - Rank: 64th of 100

Population (2025)
  - Total: 1,379
  - Rank: 96th of 100
  - Density: 59.16/km^{2} (153.2/sq mi)
  - Rank: 91st of 100
- Time zone: UTC+1 (CET)
  - Summer (DST): UTC+2 (CEST)
- LAU 2: LU0001002
- Website: bech.lu

Bech (German pronunciation: [bɛç], Luxembourgish pronunciation: [bæɕ]) is a commune and small town in eastern Luxembourg. It is part of the canton of Echternach, which until 2015 was part of the district of Grevenmacher.

As of September 2026, the town of Bech, which lies in the east of the commune, has a population of 469. Villages within the commune include Altrier and Rippig.

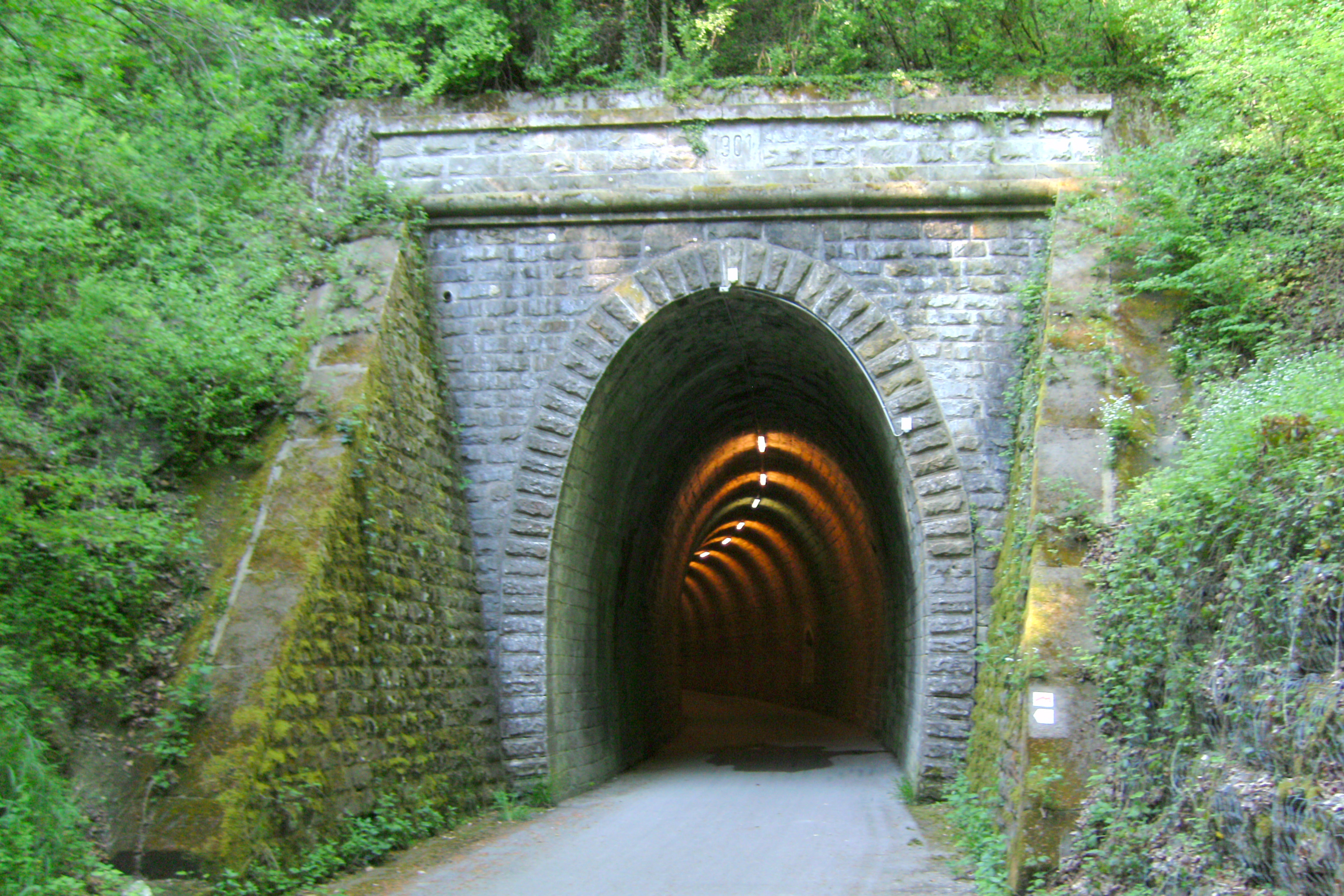
Western side of the old railway tunnel built in 1901, now converted to a bicycle route

== Population ==
Historical population

Year	Pop.	±%
1821	766	—
1851	1,347	+75.8%
1900	1,324	−1.7%
1910	1,096	−17.2%
1922	1,088	−0.7%
1935	961	−11.7%

Year	Pop.	±%
1947	893	−7.1%
1960	739	−17.2%
1970	688	−6.9%
1981	715	+3.9%
1990	793	+10.9%
2000	985	+24.2%

Year	Pop.	±%
2005	970	−1.5%
2010	1,034	+6.6%
2015	1,260	+21.9%
2020	1,273	+1.0%
2021	1,305	+2.5%

Source data
