= Manderen-Ritzing =

- Commune
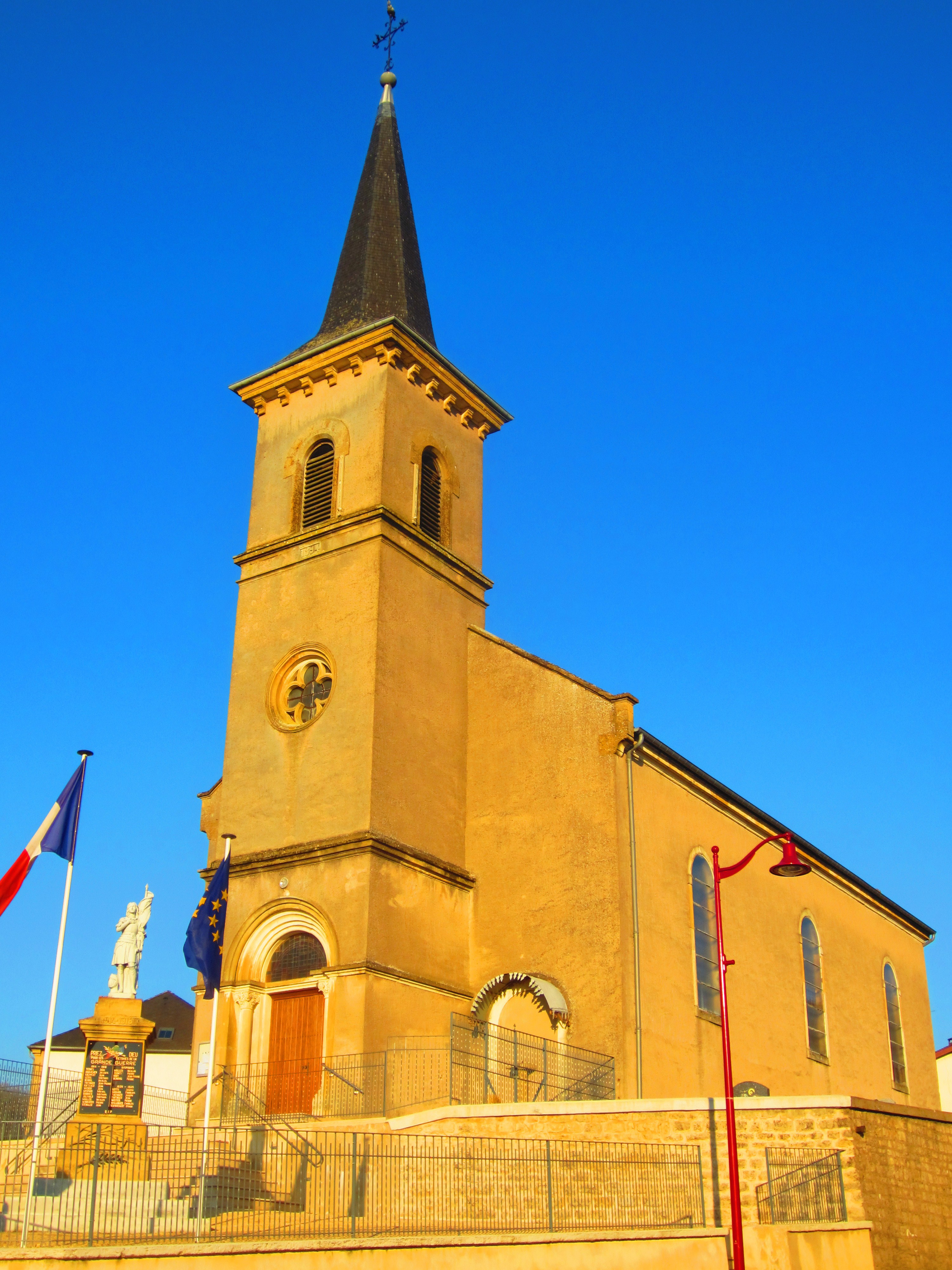
- The church in Manderen
- Location of Manderen-Ritzing
- Location within France Location within Grand Est
- Coordinates: 49°27′03″N 6°26′13″E
- Country: France
- Region: Grand Est
- Department: Moselle
- Arrondissement: Thionville
- Canton: Bouzonville
- Intercommunality: Bouzonvillois-Trois Frontières

Government
  - Mayor (2020–2026): Régis Dorbach
- Area^{1}: 15.07 km^{2} (5.82 sq mi)
- Highest elevation: 416 m (1,365 ft)
- Lowest elevation: 216 m (709 ft)
- Population (2023): 613
  - Density: 40.7/km^{2} (105/sq mi)
- Time zone: UTC+01:00 (CET)
  - Summer (DST): UTC+02:00 (CEST)
- INSEE/Postal code: 57439 /57480
- ^{1} French Land Register data, which excludes lakes, ponds, glaciers > 1 km^{2} (0.386 sq mi or 247 acres) and river estuaries.

Manderen-Ritzing (German: Mandern) is a commune in the Moselle department in Grand Est in north-eastern France. It was established on 1 January 2019 by merger of the former communes of Manderen (the seat) and Ritzing.

== See also ==
- Communes of the Moselle department
