= Welfrange =

Coordinates: 49°32′N 6°17′E

Welfrange (Luxembourgish: Welfreng, German: Welfringen) is a village in the commune of Dalheim, in south-eastern Luxembourg. As of September 2026, the village has a population of 240.

== See also ==
- List of villages in Luxembourg
