= Manderen =

Commune in Moselle, France

- Part of Manderen-Ritzing
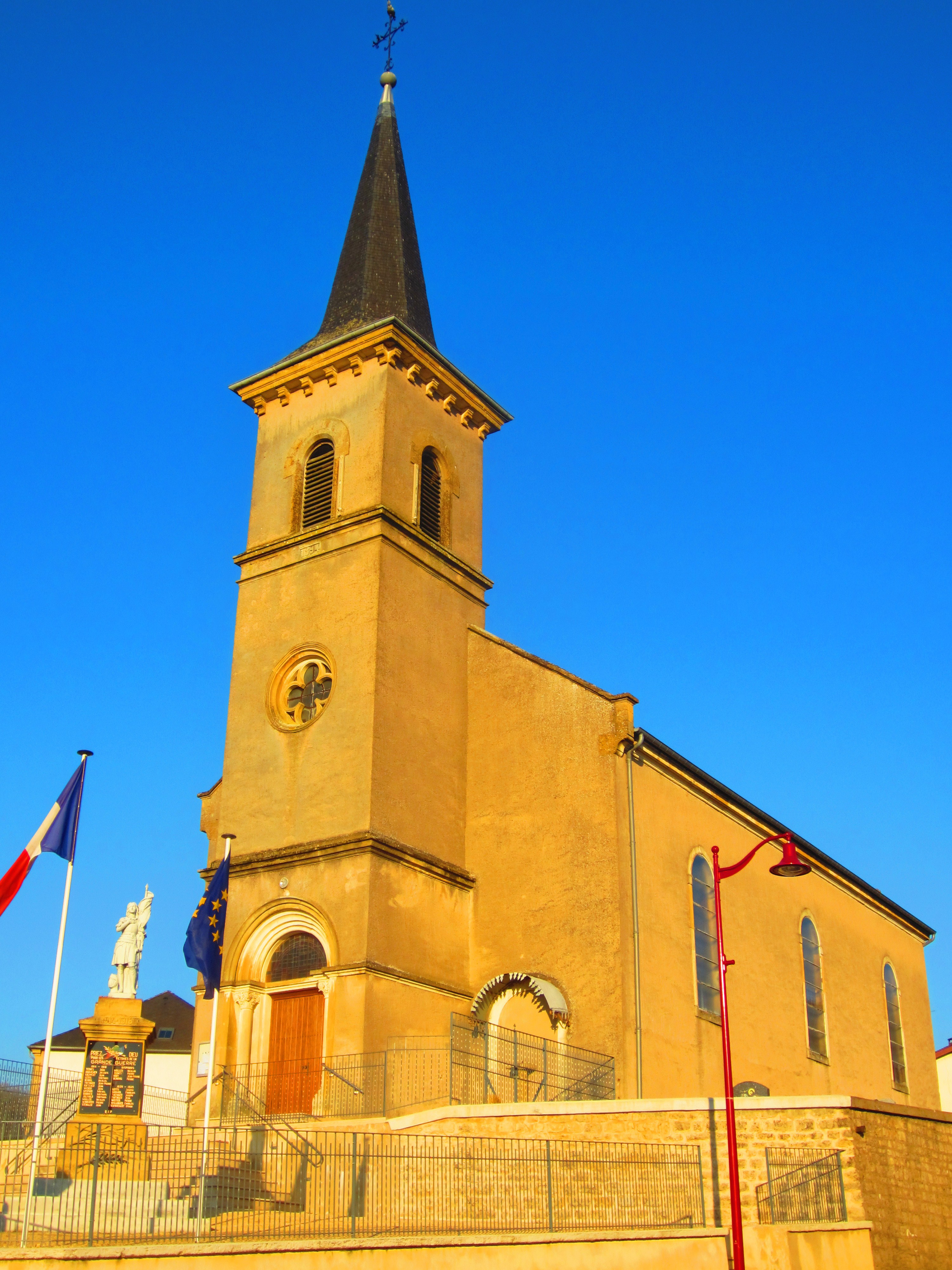
- The church in Manderen

- Coat of arms
- Location of Manderen
- Location within France Location within Grand Est
- Coordinates: 49°27′03″N 6°26′13″E
- Country: France
- Region: Grand Est
- Department: Moselle
- Arrondissement: Thionville
- Canton: Bouzonville
- Commune: Manderen-Ritzing
- Area^{1}: 8.92 km^{2} (3.44 sq mi)
- Elevation: 255 m (837 ft)
- Highest elevation: 416 m (1,365 ft)
- Lowest elevation: 216 m (709 ft)
- Population (2019): 421
  - Density: 47.2/km^{2} (122/sq mi)
- Time zone: UTC+01:00 (CET)
  - Summer (DST): UTC+02:00 (CEST)
- Postal code: 57480
- ^{1} French Land Register data, which excludes lakes, ponds, glaciers > 1 km^{2} (0.386 sq mi or 247 acres) and river estuaries.

Manderen (French pronunciation: [mɑ̃dʁən]; German: Mandern; Luxembourgish: Manneren) is a former commune in the Moselle department in Grand Est in north-eastern France. On 1 January 2019, it was merged into the new commune Manderen-Ritzing.

== See also ==
- Communes of the Moselle department
