= Filsdorf =

Filsdorf Fëlschdref
- Town
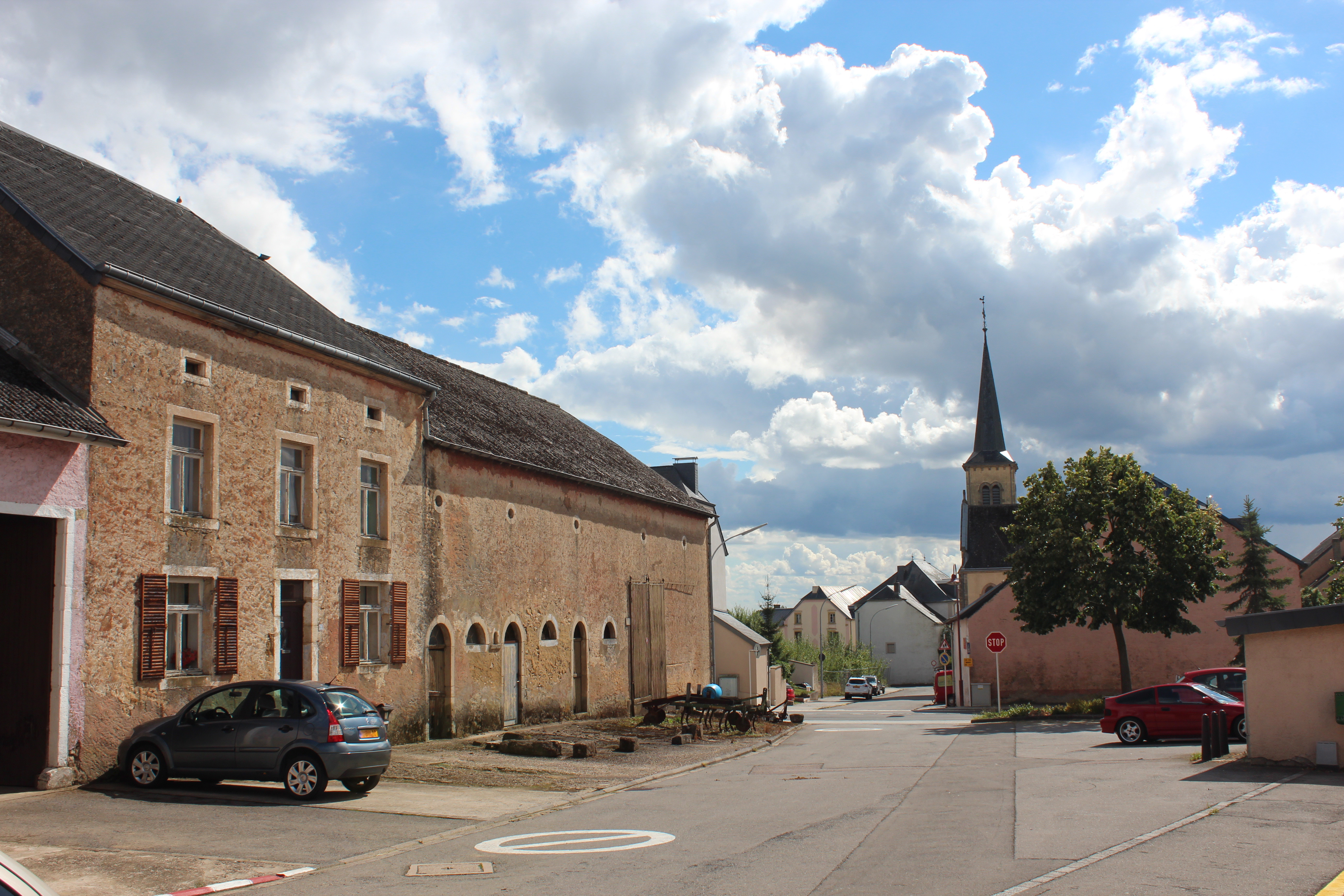

- Location within Luxembourg
- Coordinates: 49.533857°N 6.247101°E
- Country: Luxembourg
- Canton: Remich
- Commune: Dalheim
- Elevation: 288 m (945 ft)

Population (2026)
  - Total: 588
- Time zone: UTC+1 (CET)
  - Summer (DST): UTC+2 (CEST)
- Postal code: L-5471

Filsdorf (German pronunciation: [ˈfɪlsˌdɔʁf]; Luxembourgish: Fëlschdref) is a small town in the commune of Dalheim, in south-eastern Luxembourg.

As of 2026, the town had a population of 588.
