= Titelberg =

Celtic oppidum in Luxembourg

Coordinates: 49°32′15″N 5°51′45″E

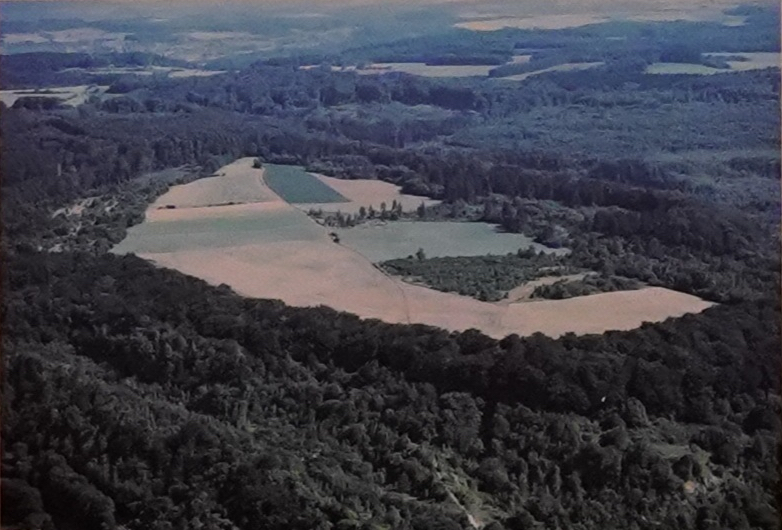
Photo of the Titelberg plateau

Titelberg (Luxembourgish: Tëtelbierg) is the site of a large Celtic or Germanic settlement or oppidum in the extreme south west of Luxembourg. In the 1st century BCE, this thriving community was probably the capital of the Treveri people. The site thus provides telling evidence of urban civilization in the century before the Roman conquest.

== Geography ==
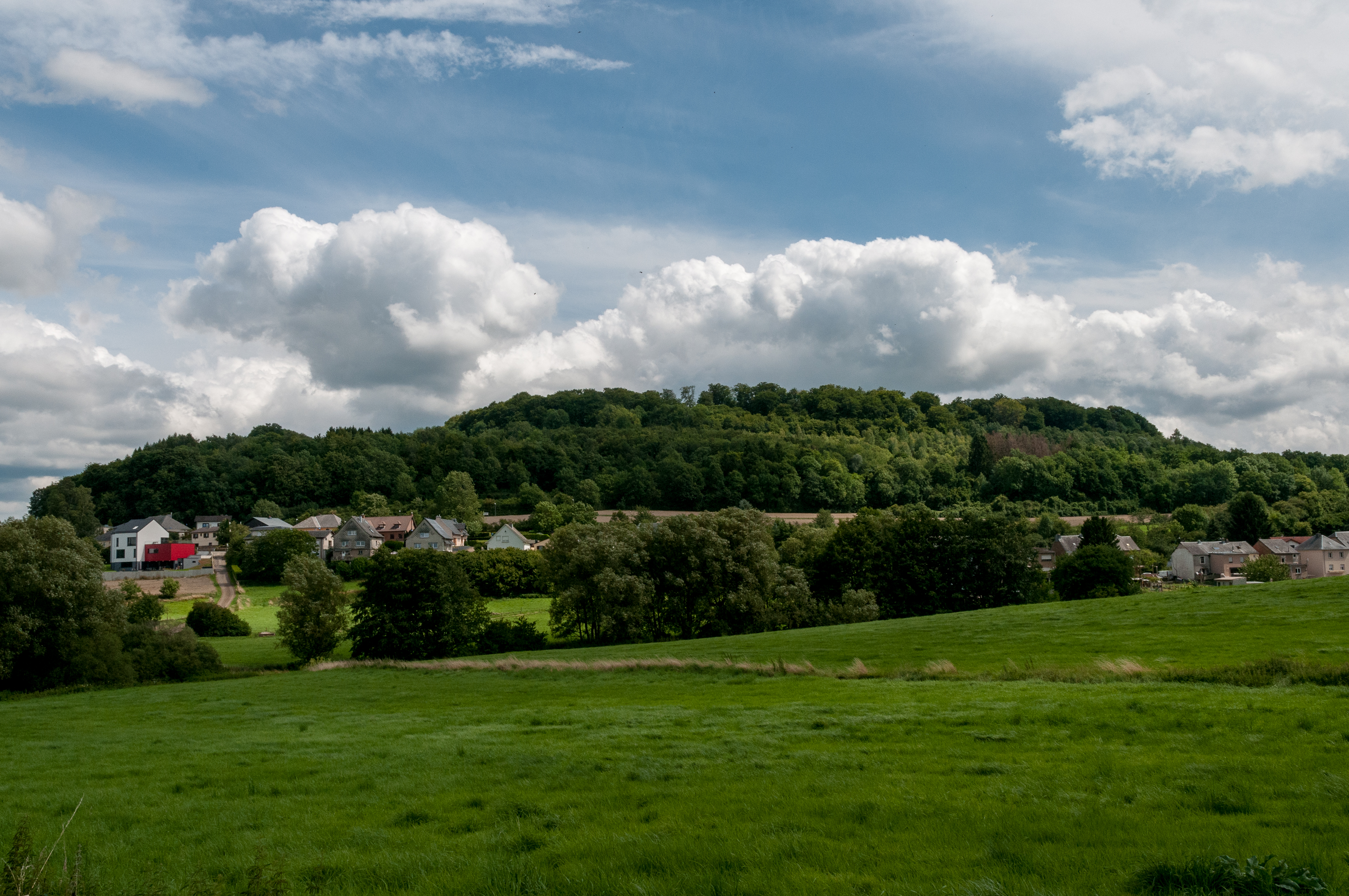
Titelberg hill

The site lies some three kilometres (1.9 mi) to the southwest of Pétange and three kilometres (1.9 mi) northwest of Differdange on a bare plateau some 390 metres (1,280 ft) above sea level. It is surrounded by steep forested slopes which run down to the Chiers, a 100 metres (330 ft) below. It can be reached from Niedercorn by taking the road to Roudenhaff and making a right turn towards the Fond de Gras.

== Background ==
The Celts inhabited large areas of Europe from the Danube to the Rhine and Rhône during the 6th to 1st centuries BCE, a period sometimes referred to as La Tène after a site in Switzerland where continental Celtic remains were first discovered. It was around 100 BCE that the Treveri, one of the Celtic tribes, came into a period of prosperity. They constructed a number of settlements or oppida near the Moselle valley in what is now southern Luxembourg, western Germany and eastern France. Titelberg was by far the largest of the Treveri settlements, no doubt as a result of its proximity to two of the most important Celtic roads, one from the south connecting the Rhone to the upper Moselle and the north, the other leading to Reims and the west. Another attraction were the iron ore which could be mined in the immediate vicinity and fertile lands.

== The site ==
Covering an area of some 50 ha, the oval-shaped Titelberg plateau is approximately one kilometre (0.62 mi) long (NW to SE) and 500 metres (1,600 ft) wide. It was occupied continuously for 700 years from about 300 BCE. There is evidence of sporadic settlements dating back even further, perhaps to 2000 BCE or before. From the 1st century BCE and during the Gallo-Roman period, foundations of masonry replaced the earlier, less durable constructions. These, together with the nine-metre-high (30 ft) earthen ramparts around the periphery, clearly demonstrate the importance of the Celtic oppidum which appears to have been the seat of the Treveri chiefs.

Although some interest had been shown in the site in 1928, serious archaeological excavations began in 1968 and continue today. These have been coordinated by Luxembourg's National Museum of History and Art with the assistance of specialists from the University of Missouri in the 1960s. In particular, the digs have unearthed the main residential area in the centre of the plateau and the public or recreational area, a few hundred meters to the south east. Both are located to the west of the farm road through the site which loosely follows the path of the main Celtic road that connects the two gates of the oppidum. There is also evidence of metal working and coin-minting activities long before the Roman conquest.

=== Celtic period ===
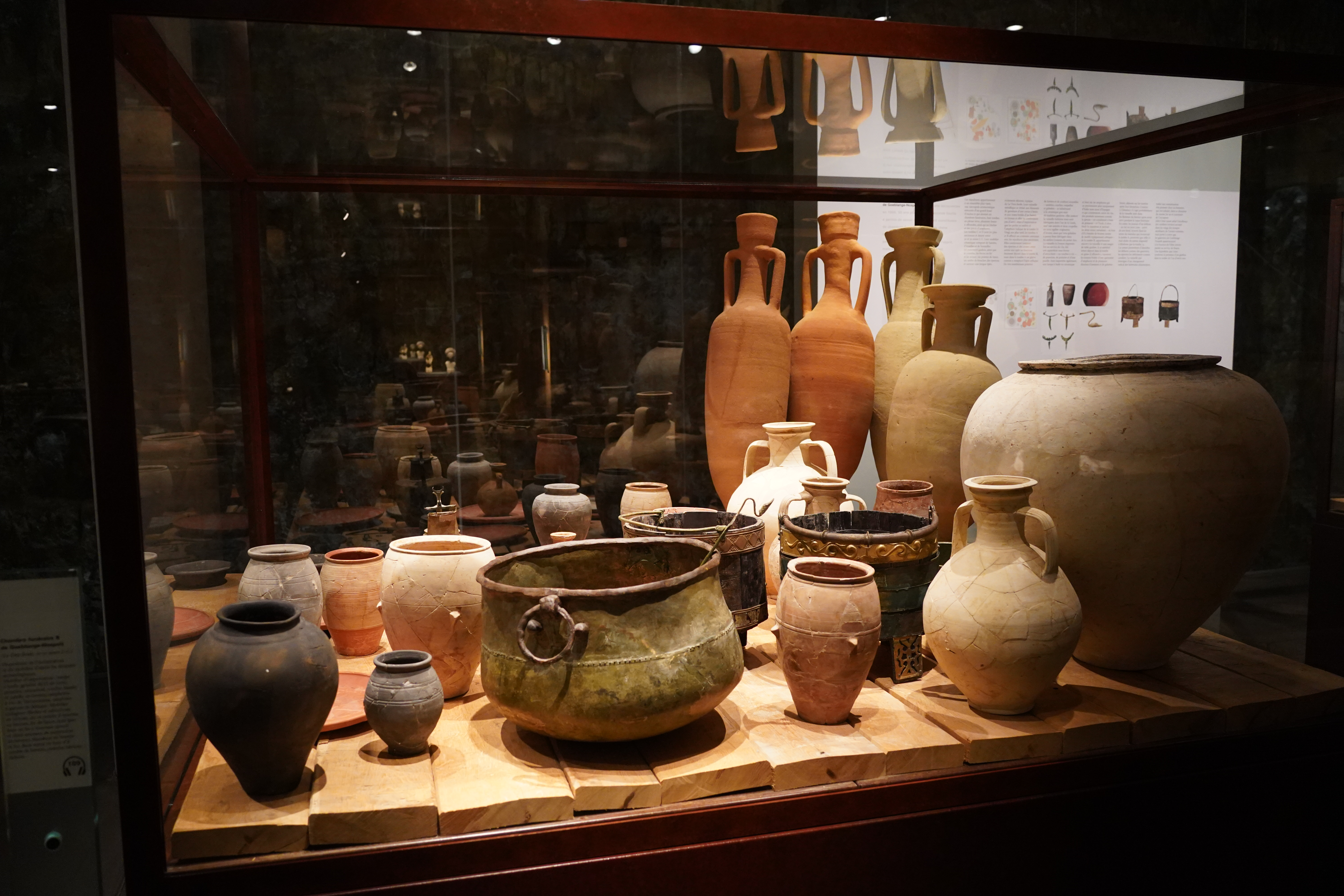
Goeblange-Nospelt Celtic grave

While there is evidence that the site was probably inhabited as far back as 2000 BCE, the beginnings of urban civilization can certainly be traced back to the 2nd century BCE when there were bronze-working shops at the site. In the 1st century BCE and the 1st century CE, the oppidum had become a civilized community trading with other Gallic centres. The Treveri nobles appear to have occupied the dwellings at the centre of the plateau. The Celtic tombs excavated in the vicinity, specifically at Clemency, at Scheierheck near Goeblange and at Kreckelbierg near Nospelt contain a range of articles including wine flagons, spurs, knives, lances and oil lanterns testifying to the aristocracy of those buried.

The entire site was originally surrounded by 10-metre-high (33 ft) reinforced ramparts of Murus Gallicus type, with fortified doors at either end of the main road through the site. The ramparts then collapsed over the years due to the lack of maintenance after the Roman conquest.

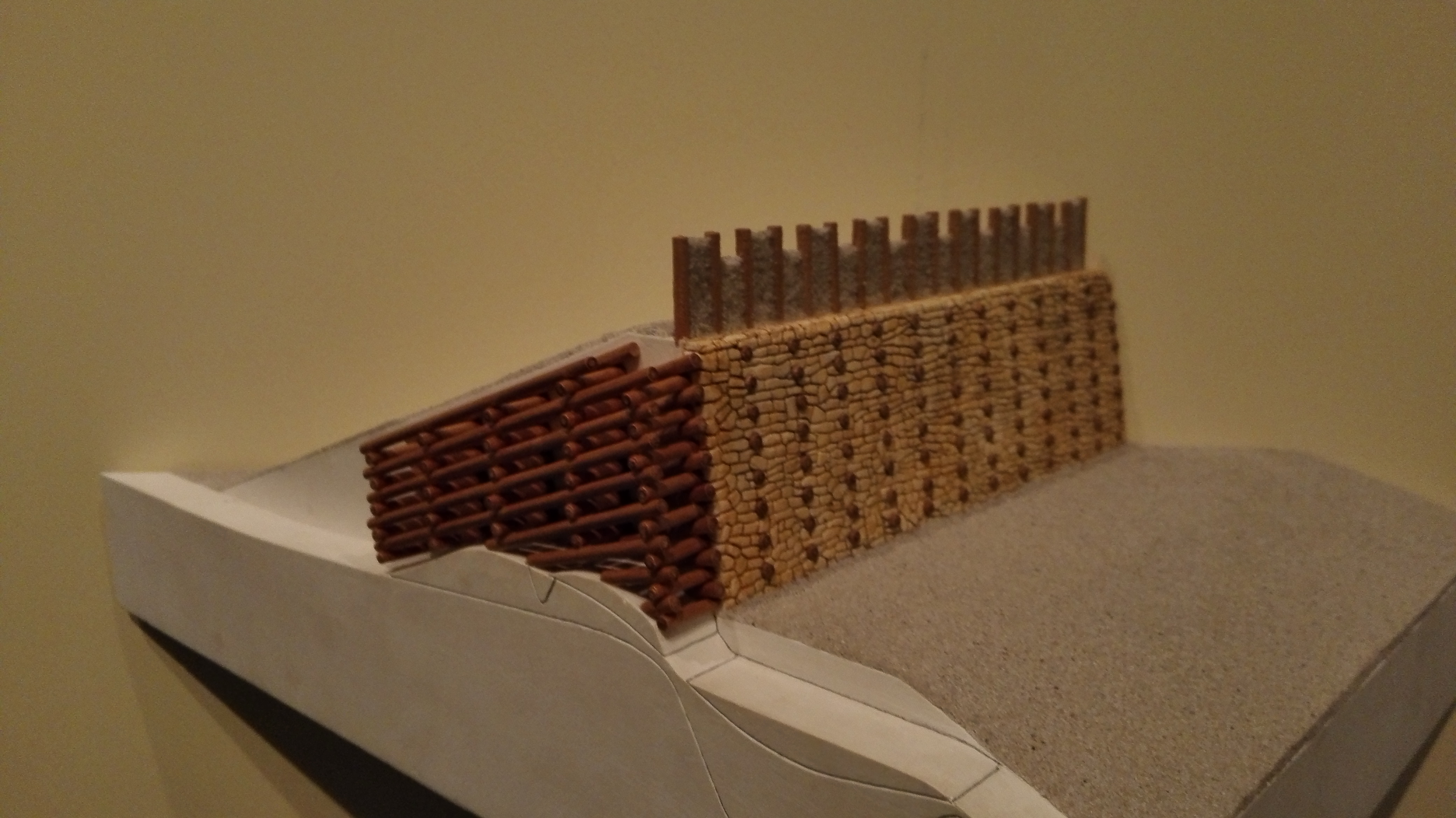
Titelberg Murus Gallicus model

A deep ditch, four metres (13 ft) wide, perpendicular to the road, separated the residential space from the public space. The residential area covering about 30 hectares (74 acres) consisted of rectangular houses, 14 metres (46 ft) long by 8 metres (26 ft) wide, built of light masonry. They were equipped with fireplaces and sometimes ovens. Trenches to drain rainwater among the houses were also discovered. In the public space, the remains of a large hall, 14-metre-square (46 ft), have been found, but no dwellings were discovered. This could have been a meeting place for political, economic and/or religious purposes.

One of the most important finds on Titelberg has been a huge number of Celtic coins which come not only from the Treveri themselves but from several other Celtic tribes. This indicates that it was a centre of trade and commerce during the Celtic period. In addition, facilities for minting coins have also been excavated close to the residential area and appear to have been used over an extended period.

A very large number of both Celtic and Gallo-Roman fibulae have also been found on the site. In a multitude of different shapes and sizes, these bronze clasps, sometimes hinged, were used either as ornamental brooches or for holding garments together.

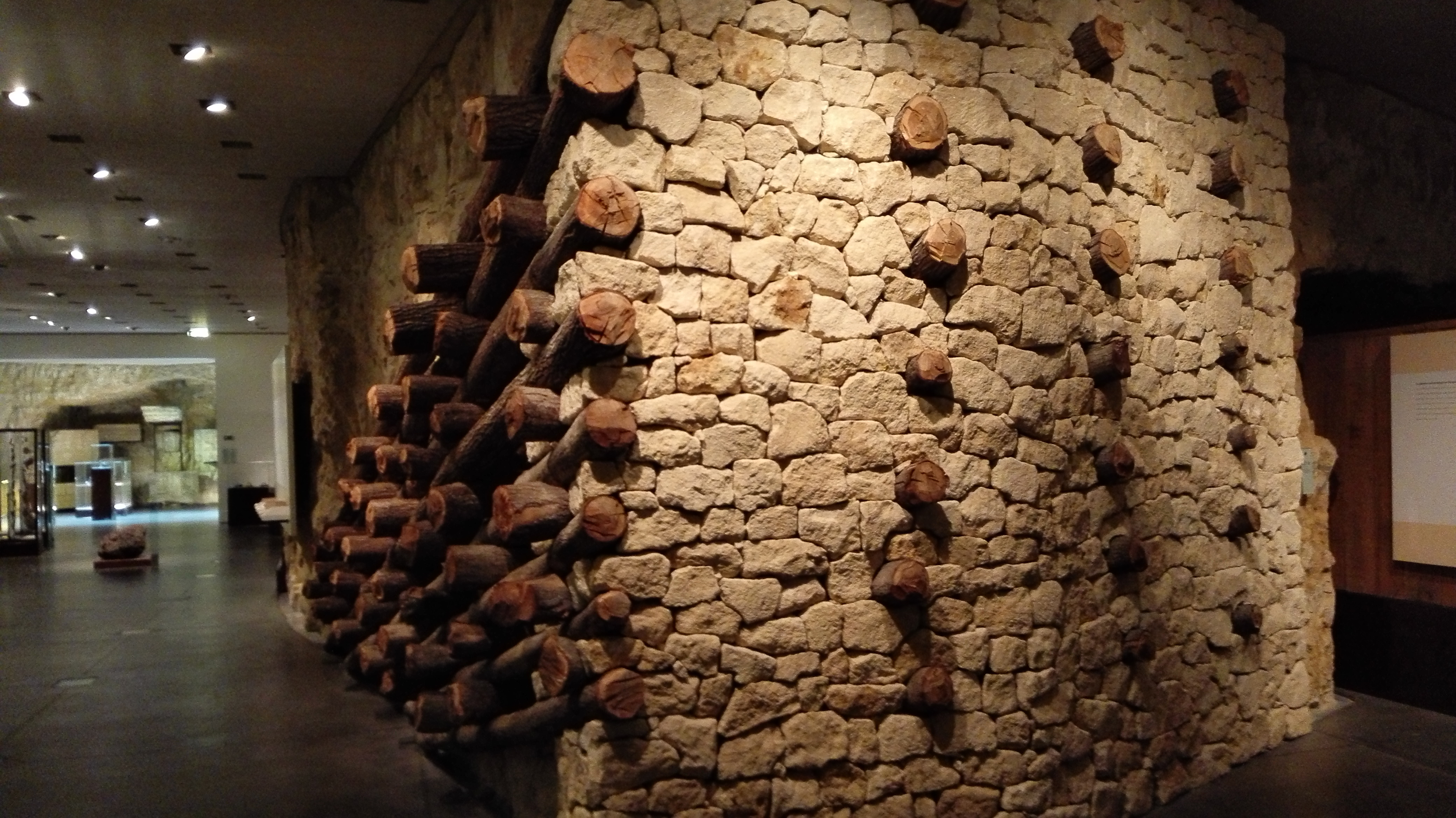
Reconstruction of the Titelberg Murus Gallicus

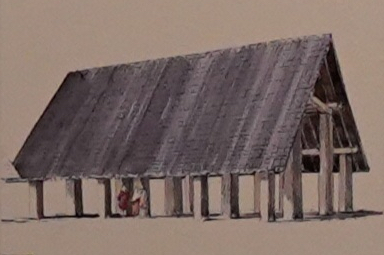
Celtic sanctuary or hall

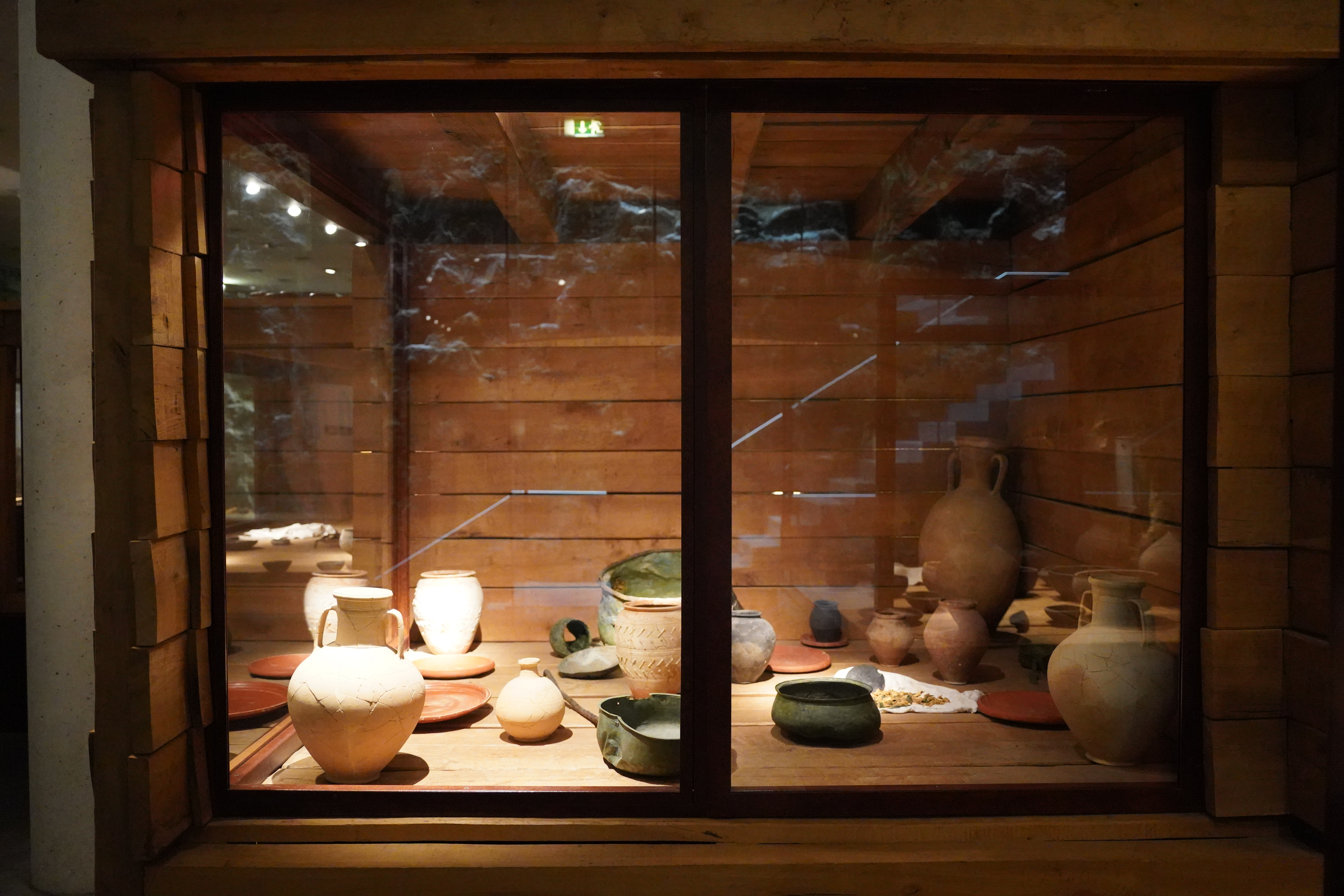
Goeblange-Nospelt Celtic grave

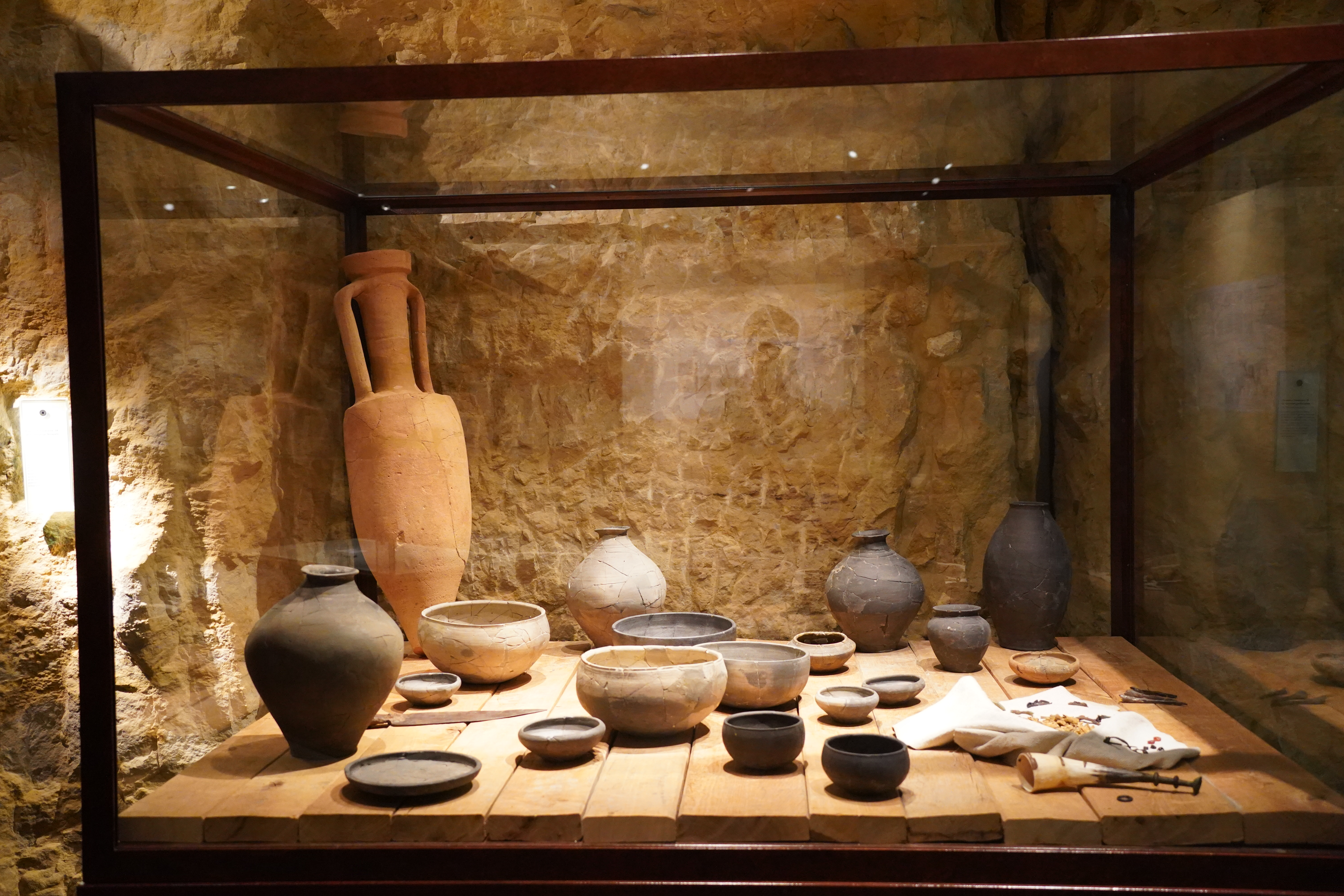
Goeblange-Nospelt Celtic grave

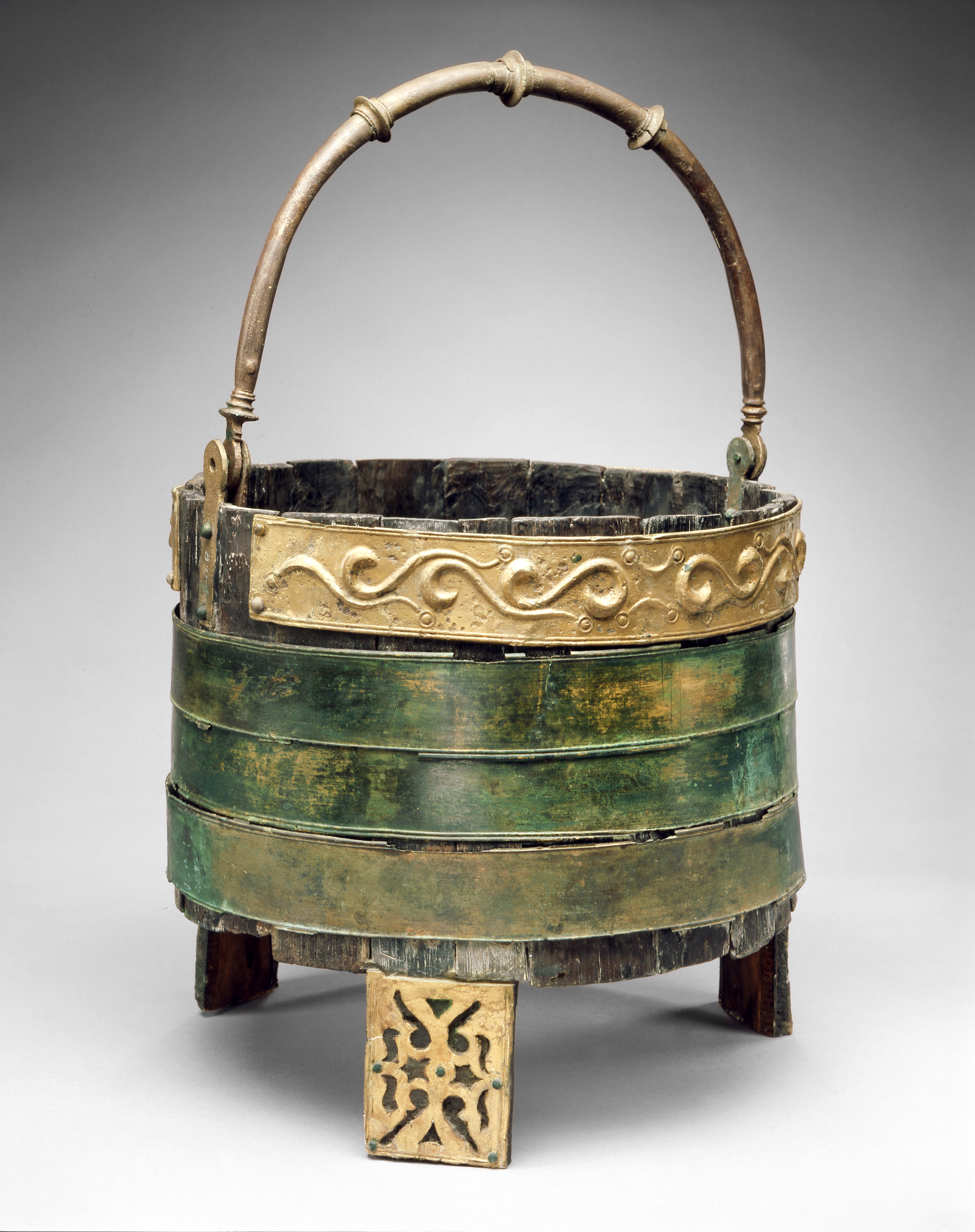
Decorated vessel from Goeblange-Nospelt

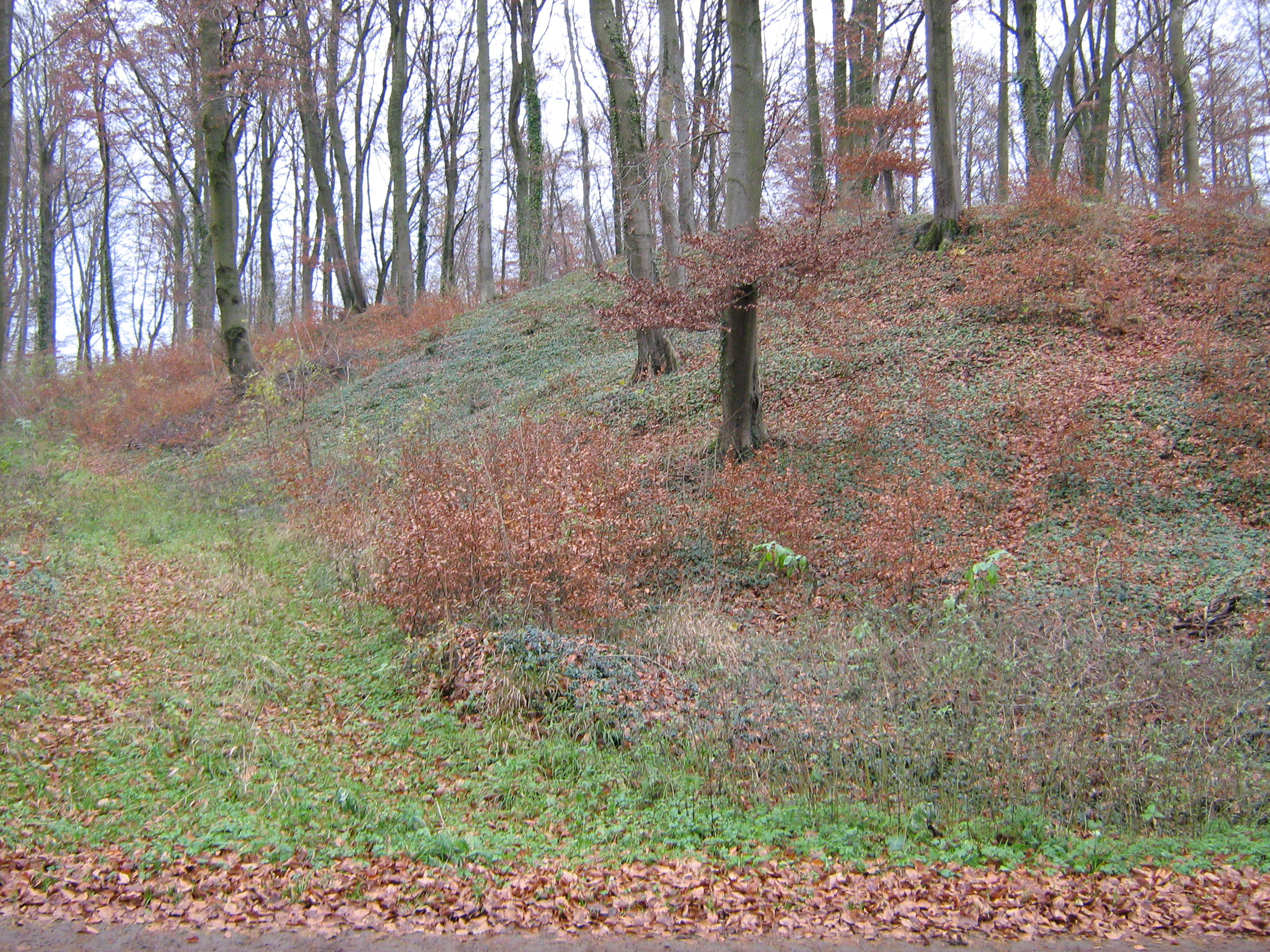
Remains of the oppidum ramparts

=== Gallo-Roman period ===
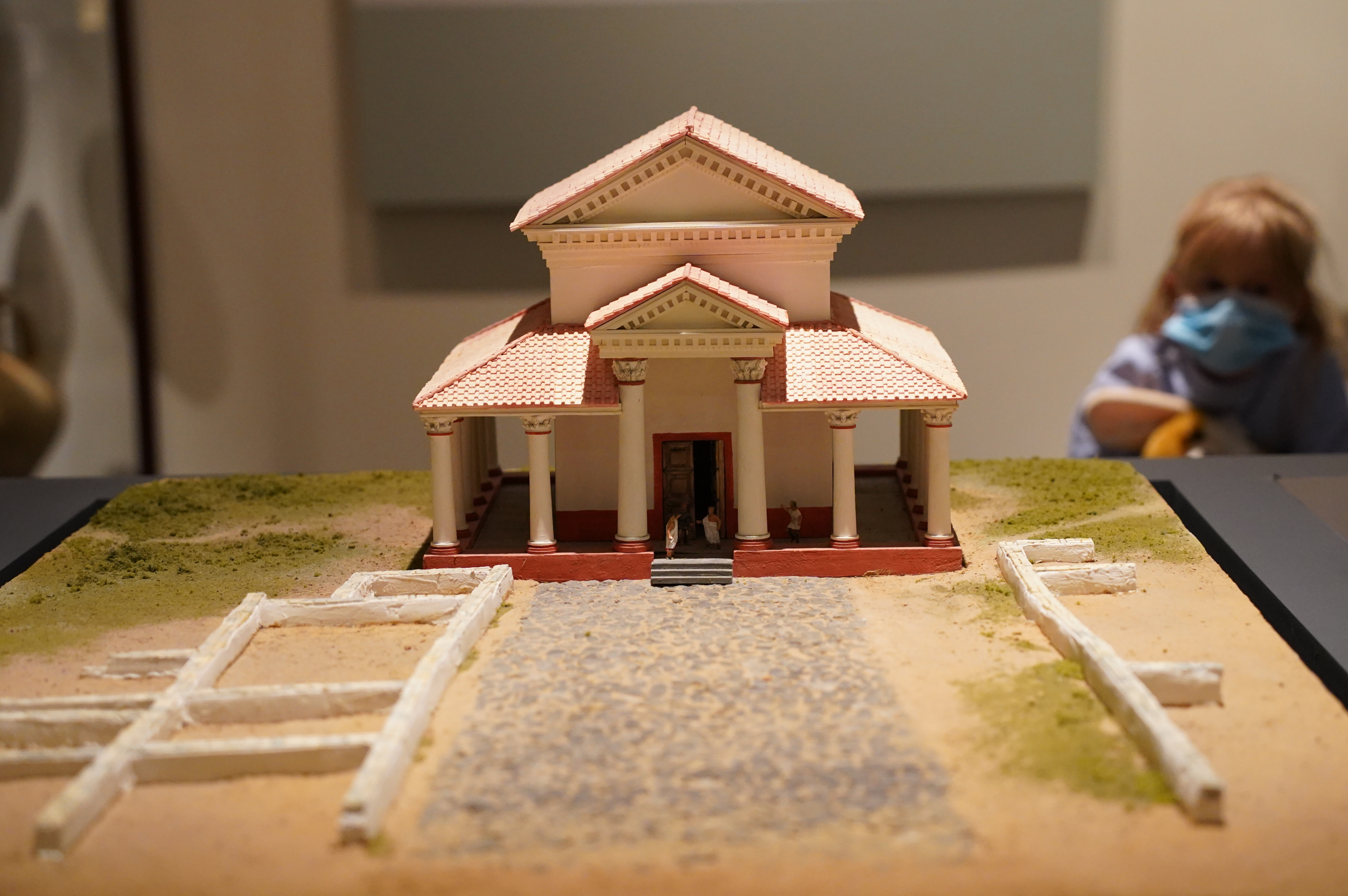
Gallo-Roman temple at Titelberg

About 20 years after the Roman conquest, the Celtic oppidum was completely reworked and at least two streets perpendicular to the main were constructed. The houses too were replaced with Roman buildings which had stone foundations and cellars.

The Treveri, despite their conflictual relationship with the Roman world, apparently adopted Roman culture and religion fairly quickly, even long before the Roman conquest. Titelberg, though no longer a capital, became a prosperous vicus with a range of activities, especially metal working. In particular, minting of coins and smelting extended at least until around 337 as one of the coins found at the site of the smelter bears the likeness of Constantine II. In the former public area, a square-shaped monumental Gallo-Roman edifice was built among dwellings and later transformed into a traditional Gallo-Roman fanum, a square-shaped temple with a roofed porch on all sides of its sacred room.

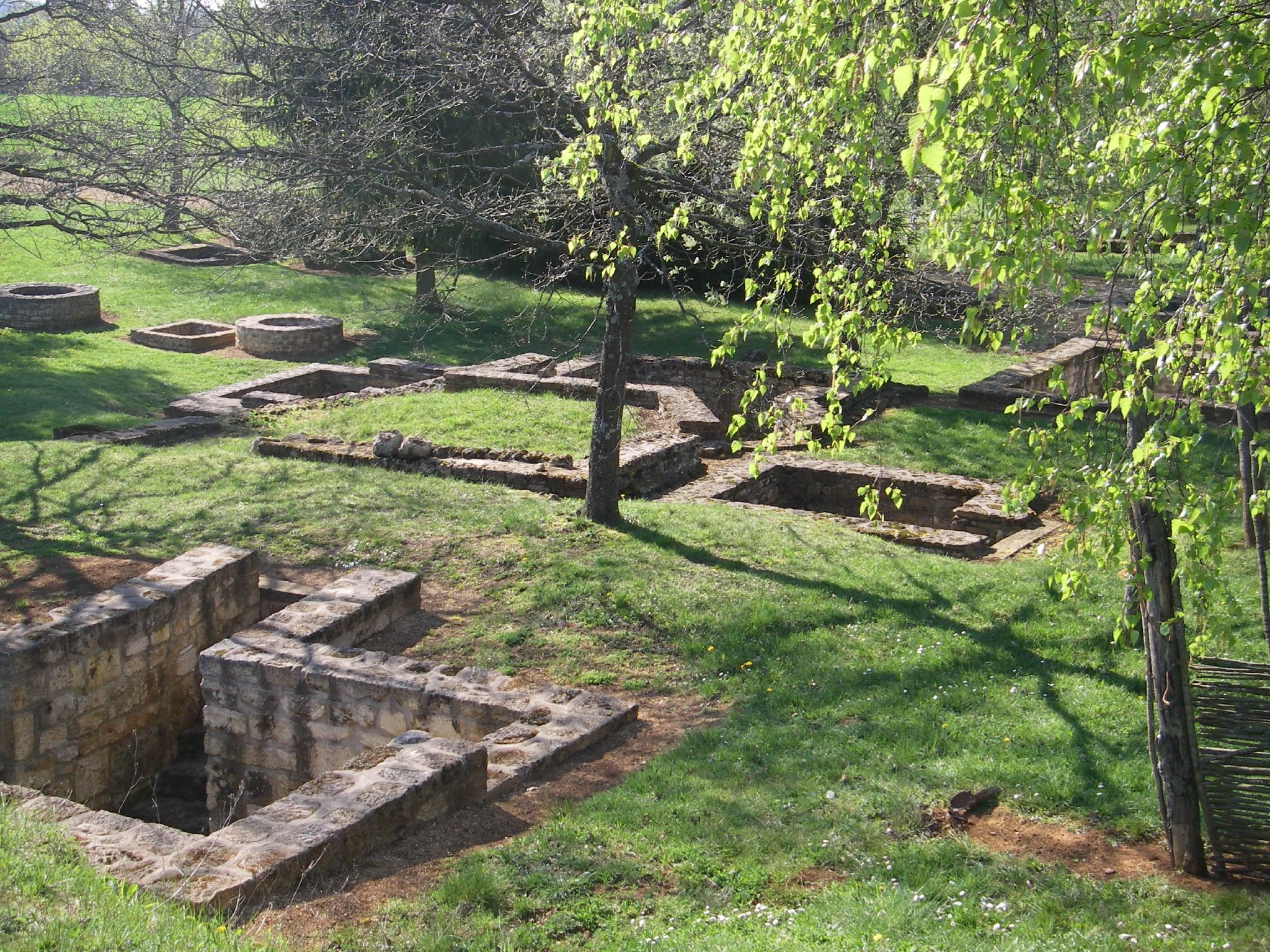
Foundations in the residential area

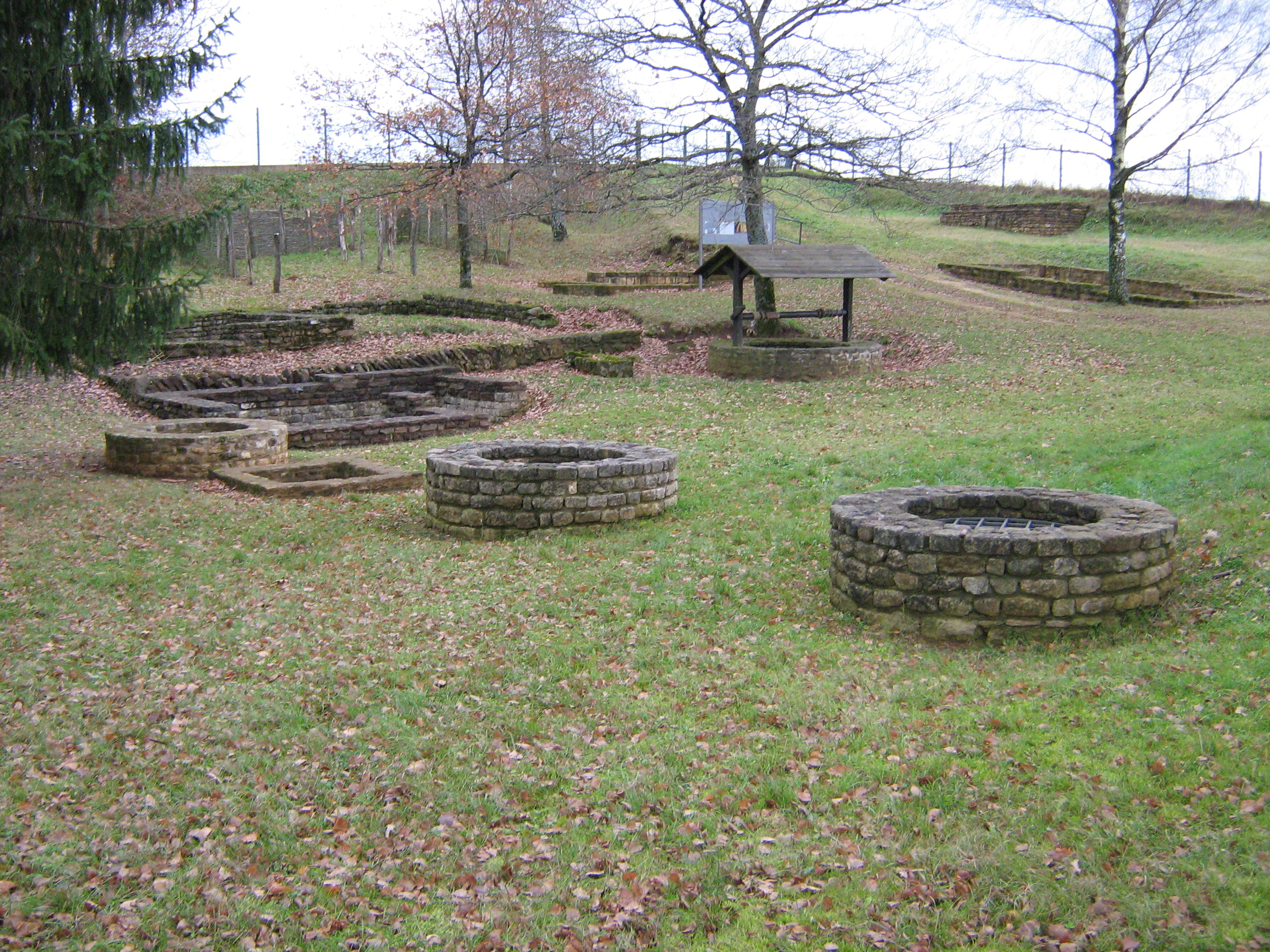
Foundations in the residential area

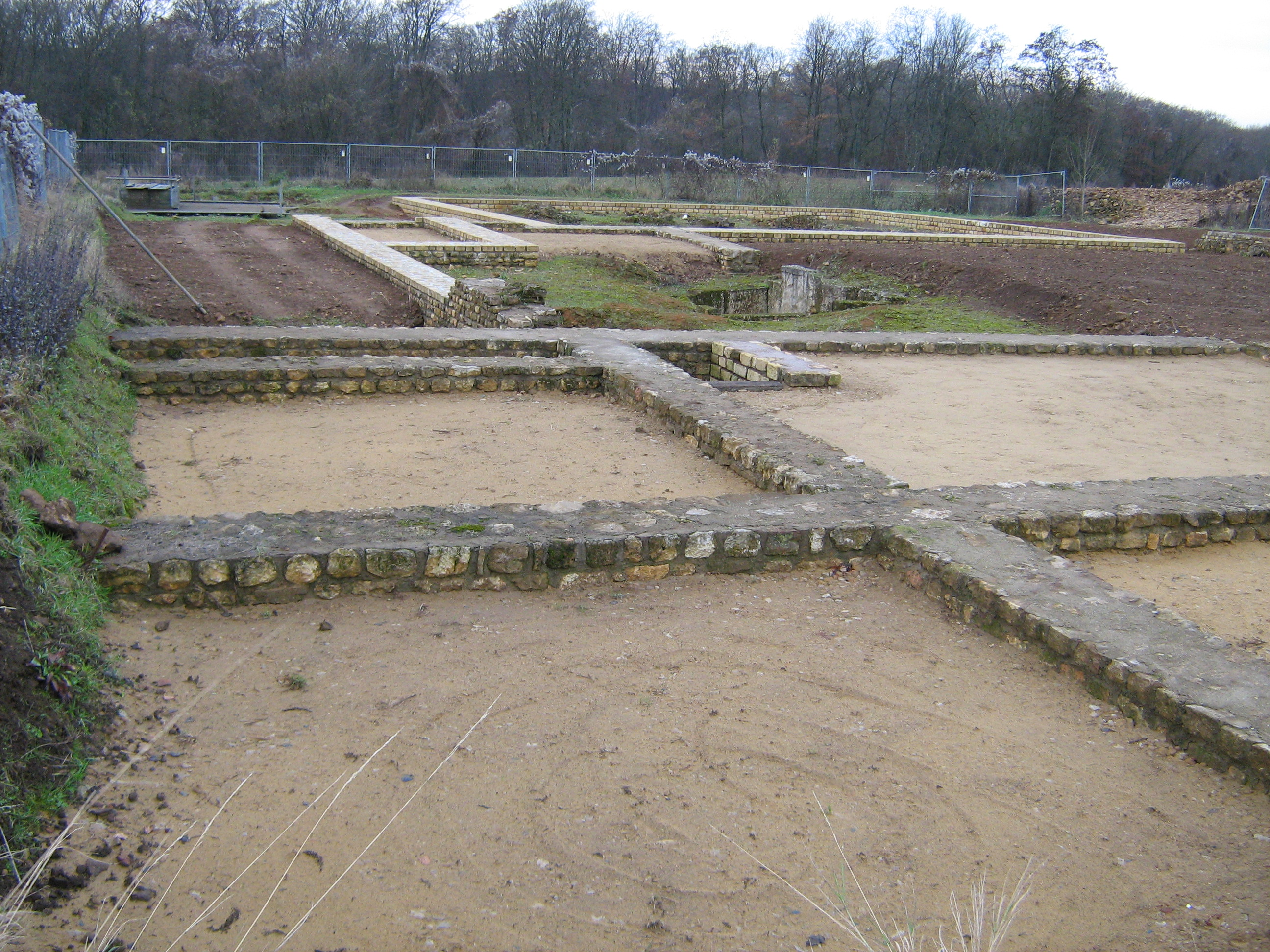
Foundations in the public area

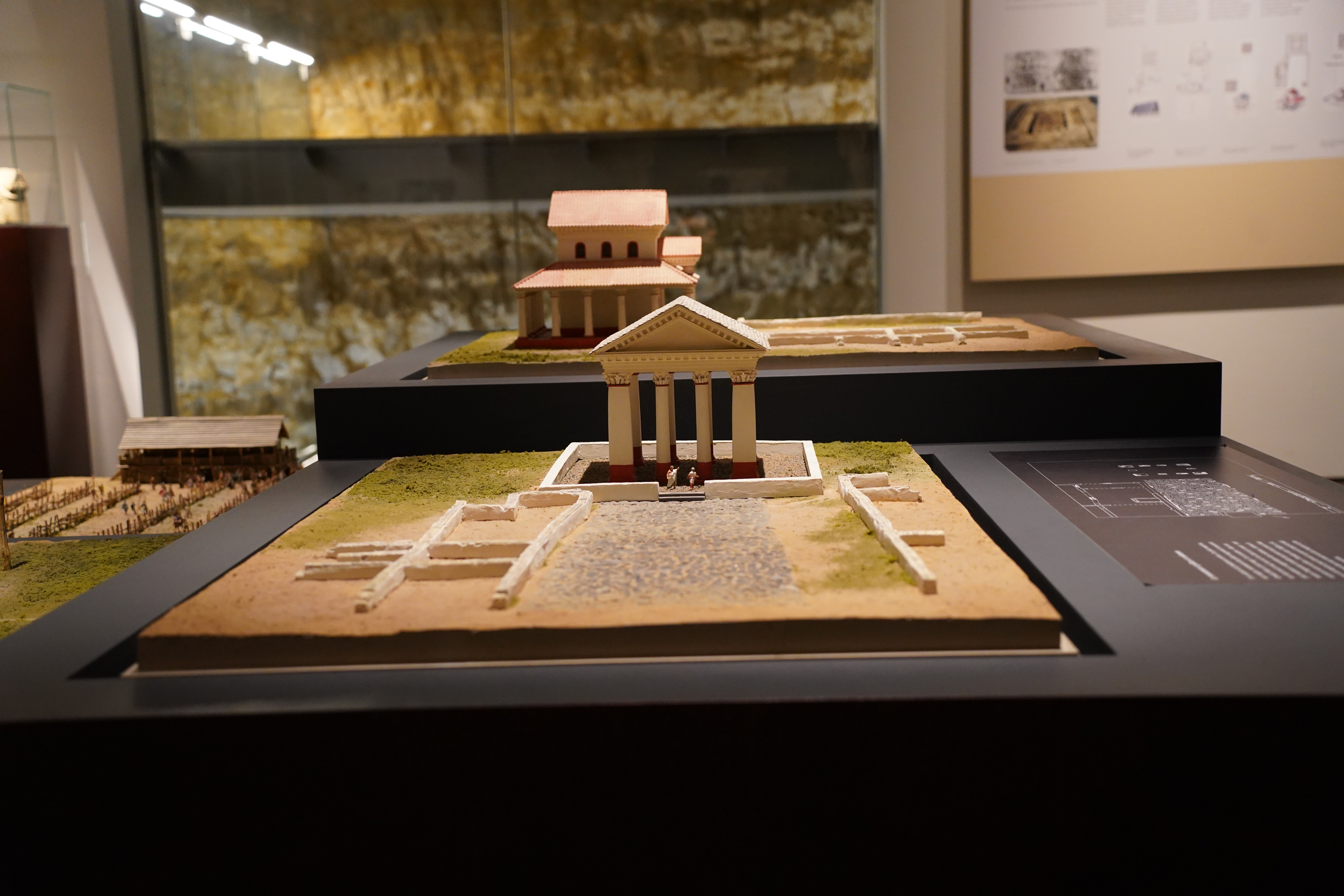
Early Gallo-Roman temple at Titelberg

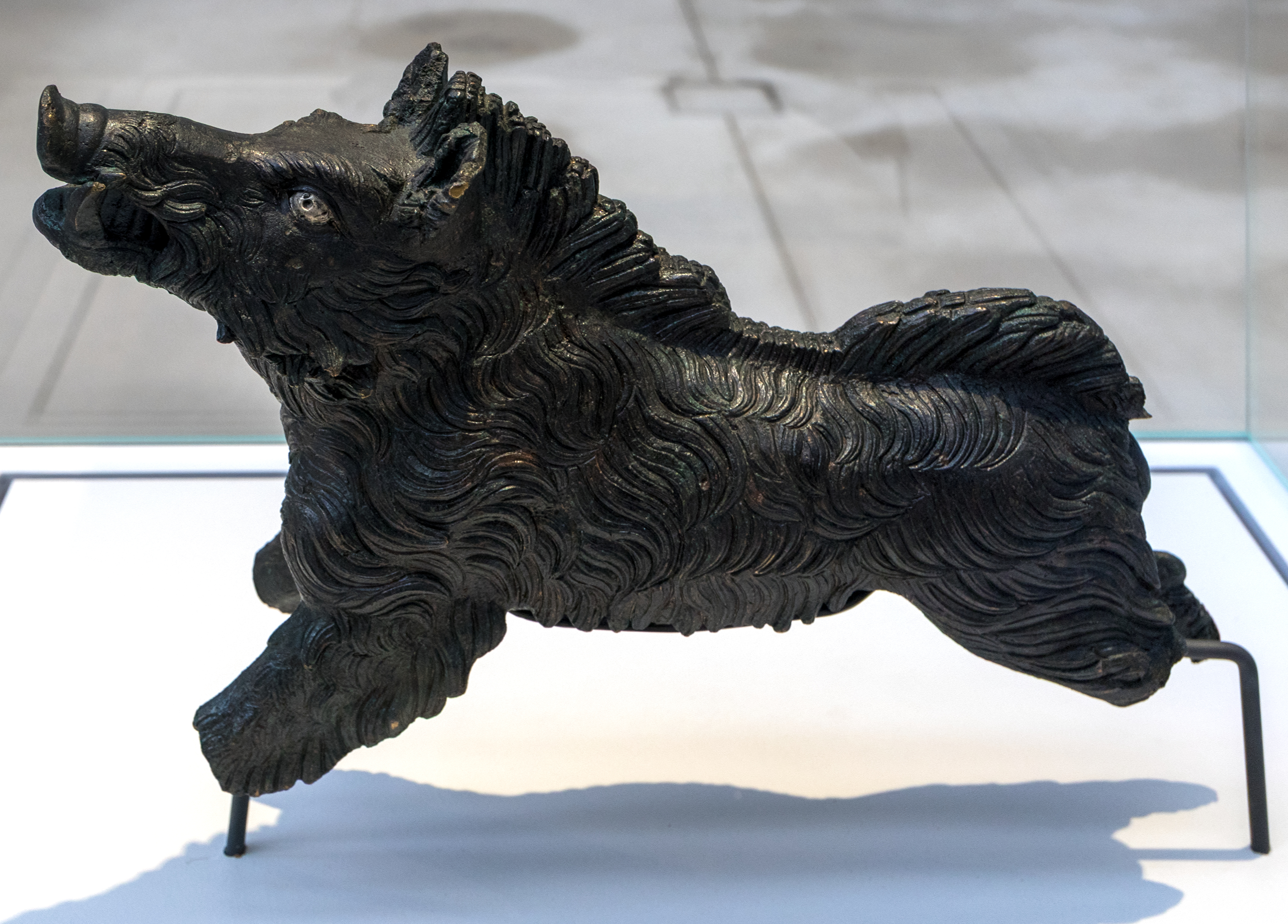
Statuette of a boar (2nd century AD), Louvre Museum

== Similar sites ==
Titelberg resembles a number of other Celtic oppidum sites. In particular, Bibracte, probably the capital of the Aedui, near Autun in France has similar dimensions and fortifications. Manching in Bavaria is a considerably larger site and Ensérune near Béziers in southern France also has a hilltop position.

== See also ==
- Celtic Luxembourg

== Bibliography ==
- Gaspar, Nicolas: Die keltischen und gallo-römischen Fibeln vom Titelberg: Les fibules gauloises et gallo-romaines du Titelberg, Luxembourg, Musée national d’histoire et d’art, 2007, 325 p., ISBN 9782879859361
- Metzler, Jeannot: Das treverische Oppidum auf dem Titelberg : zur Kontinuität zwischen der spätkeltischen und der frührömischen Zeit in Nord-Gallien, Luxembourg, Musée national d’histoire et d’art, 1995, 789 p., ISBN 2-87985-024-X
- Metzler, J.,/ Metzler-Zens, N./ Méniel, P. et al. (Hrsg.): Lamadelaine – une nécropole de l’oppidum du Titelberg. Dossier d’Archeologie du Musée National d’Histoire et d’Art IV. Luxembourg 1999.
- Rowlett, R. M./ Thomas, H. L./ Rowlett, E. S.-J..: Stratified Iron Age House Floors in the Titelberg, Luxembourg. In: Journal of Field Archaeology. Vol. 9, No. 3, 1982, 301–312.
- Thomas, H. L., Rowlett, R. M., Rowlett, E. S.-J.: The Titelberg: A Hill Fort of Celtic and Roman Times. In: Archaeology, Vol. 28, No. 1, 1975, 55–57.
- Thomas, H. L., Rowlett, R. M., Rowlett, E. S.-J.: Excavations of the Titelberg. Luxembourg. In: Journal of Field Archaeology, Vol. 3, No. 3, 1976, 241–259.
- Trausch, Gilbert / Metzler, Jeannot / Margue, Michel / Gengler, Claude: Histoire du Luxembourg – Le destin européen d'un "petit pays", Editions Privat, Toulouse, 333 pp. ISBN 2-7089-4773-7
- Shaw, Matthew L.: The North Smelter at Titelberg – Post-imperial Bronze Recycling in Belgic Gaul. University of Missouri. 2007.
- Weiller, Raymond: Coins From Features Found by the Missouri Excavations at Titelberg. In Horizons and Styles: Studies in Art and Archaeology in Honour of Professor Homer L. Thomas, ed. Paul Åström, pp. 269–289, Paul Åströms Förlag: Jonsered. 1993, ISBN 91-7081-072-9
