= Dalheim Ricciacum =

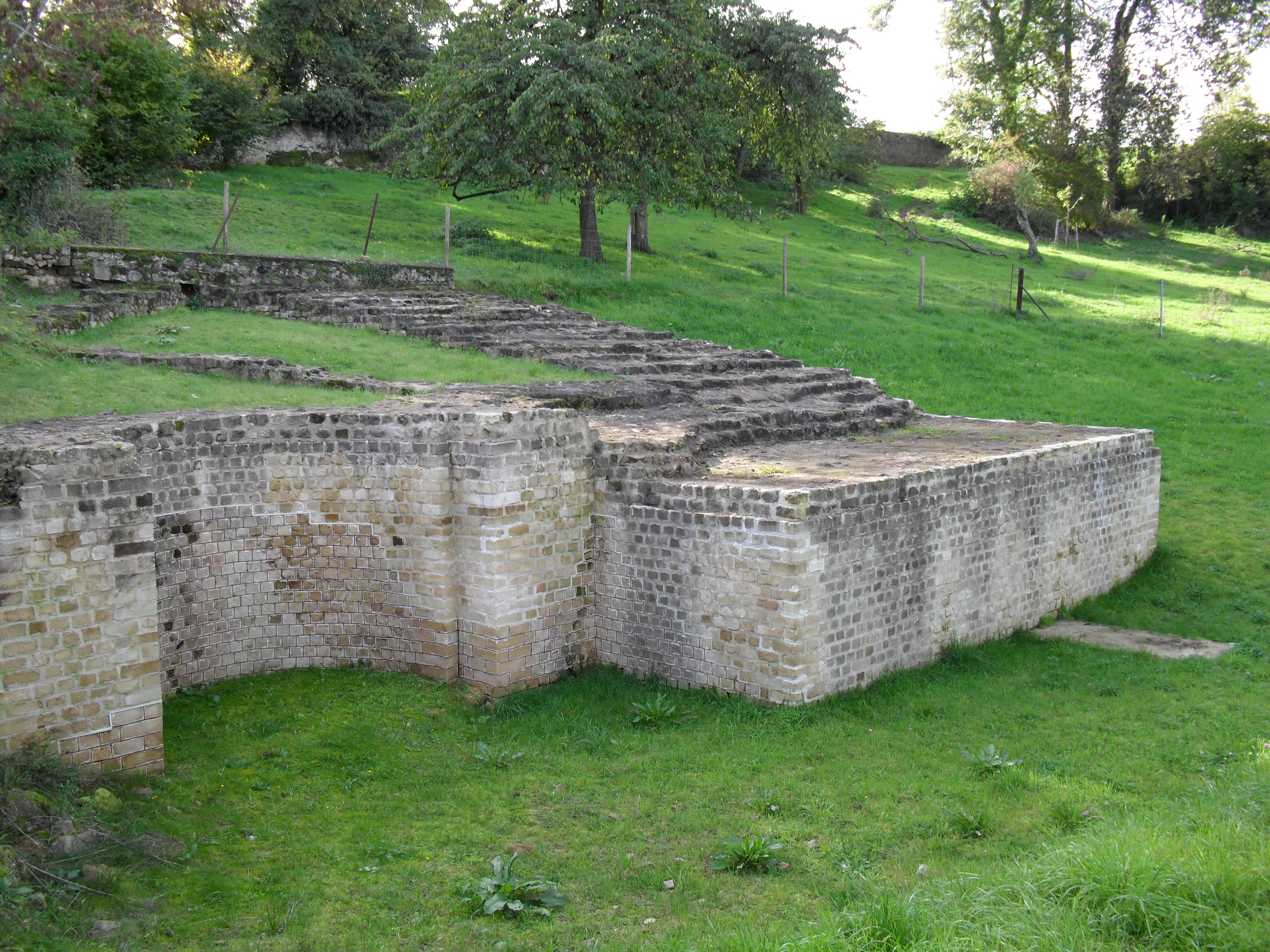
The Gallo-Roman theatre, Dalheim

Dalheim Ricciacum is the site of a Gallo-Roman vicus at Dalheim in south eastern Grand Duchy of Luxembourg. Founded during the reign of the Emperor Augustus, the site was at a strategic point on the Via Agrippa, the main Roman road from the Mediterranean to the Rhine. The well-preserved theatre dating from the 2nd century AD could accommodate 3,500 people.

== Excavation ==
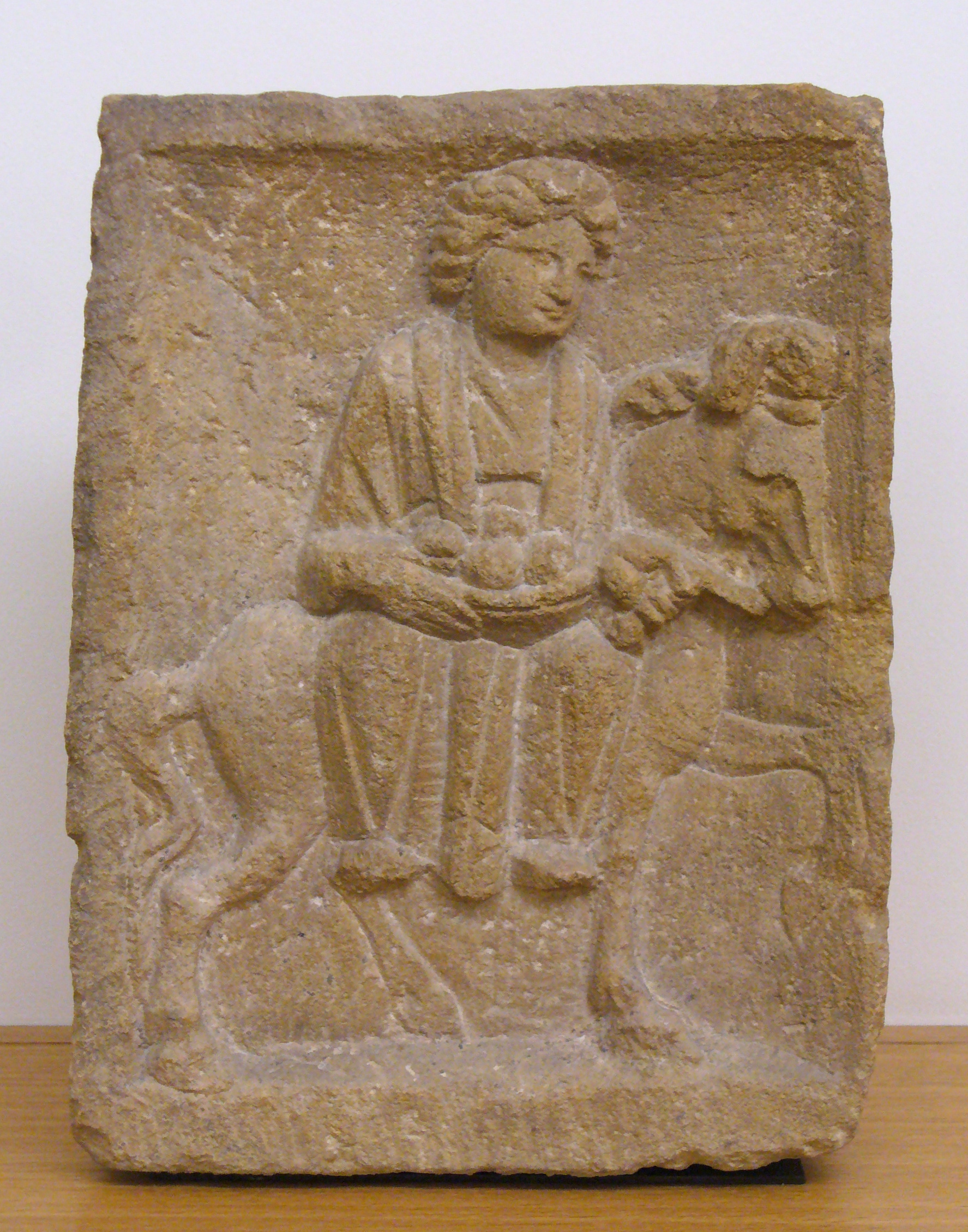
Relief of the Gallo-Roman goddess Epona, found at Dalheim

The site was first excavated by the Société Archéologique around 1850 under Antoine Namur (1812–1828). Thousands of objects were discovered, registered and described in three reports. More systematic excavations were carried out by the National Museum of History and Art over a 30-year period starting in the 1980s.

== History ==
It appears that the settlement grew considerably until by the 3rd century AD it covered an area of about 25 hectares (62 acres). In addition to the theatre there were private houses and large public buildings including a hostel, several temples and baths. There were also two large cemeteries. The findings indicate the population consisted of artisans and merchants. One of the more important finds was a magnificent temple measuring 28 by 19 metres. It dates from Emperor Hadrian's reign, about 130 AD.

Important dates in connection with the Vicus Ricciacum are:

- 58-50 BC: Conquest of Gaul by Julius Caesar
- 18–17 BC: Construction of the highway from the Mediterranean to the Rhine by Marcus Agrippa and the founding of Vicus Ricciacum
- 70–71 AD: reallocation of the settlement area
- 275–276: Germanic invasion, the first violent destruction of the vicus
- 353–355: Germanic invasion, renewed destruction of the vicus
- 407: beginning of the Barbarian invasions, final destruction of the Roman settlement

The name Ricciacum survived into the 10th century in the name of pagus of Rizzigau.

== Eagle monument ==
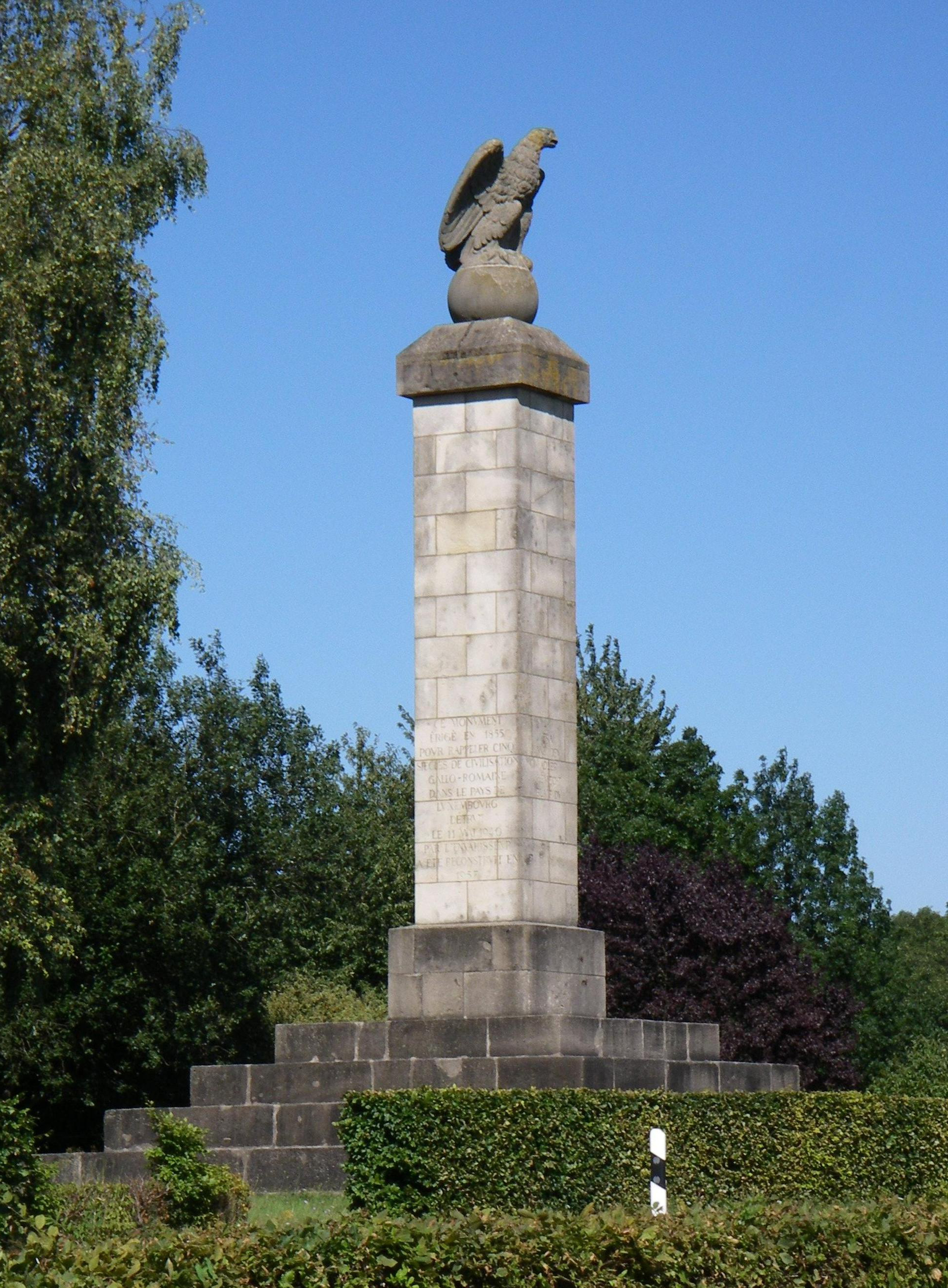
The Dalheim eagle monument

The eagle monument commemorates the old Roman town Ricciacum and is also the symbol of Dalheim. The huge stone blocks forming the solid base of the monument were excavated in the 19th century, not far from their present location. The blocks no doubt date back to Roman times (middle of the 3rd century). They may have been removed from the Roman theatre in order to serve as the foundations of a burgus or defensive watchtower. The monument itself was built by the Archaeological Society of Luxembourg. On 28 May 1855, the groundbreaking ceremony was held in the presence of William III of the Netherlands who was also Grand Duke of Luxembourg. The memorial commemorates the presence of the Romans on Dalheim's Petzel plateau. Standing on a globe, the eagle seems to be looking in the direction of Trier while its body is facing Metz, symbolizing the old road from Metz to Trier.

== Dispute ==
Not everyone agrees that Dalheim is in fact ancient Ricciacum. Charles Marie Ternes maintains there is little to support the association which is based solely on the Tabula Peutingeriana map which bears the inscriptions:

DIVODVRO MEDIOMATRICORVM-CARANVSCA XLII
CARANVSCA-RICCIACO X
RICCIACO-AVG.TRESVIRORVM X

meaning:

Metz-Caranusca 42 miles
Caranusca-Ricciacum 10 miles
Ricciacum-Trier 10 miles

Unfortunately, the Tabula Peutingeriana was copied, not very reliably, by 13th century monks from a Roman original. Ternes argues that Caranusca and Ricciacum could equally well be situated on the Roman road from Metz to Trier on the south side of the Moselle and that, in any case, there appear to be errors in the calculations. Whatever the case, the label Ricciacum has now been adopted to describe the site at Dalheim.
