= Altrier =

Village in Bech, Luxembourg

Coordinates: 49°45′N 6°20′E

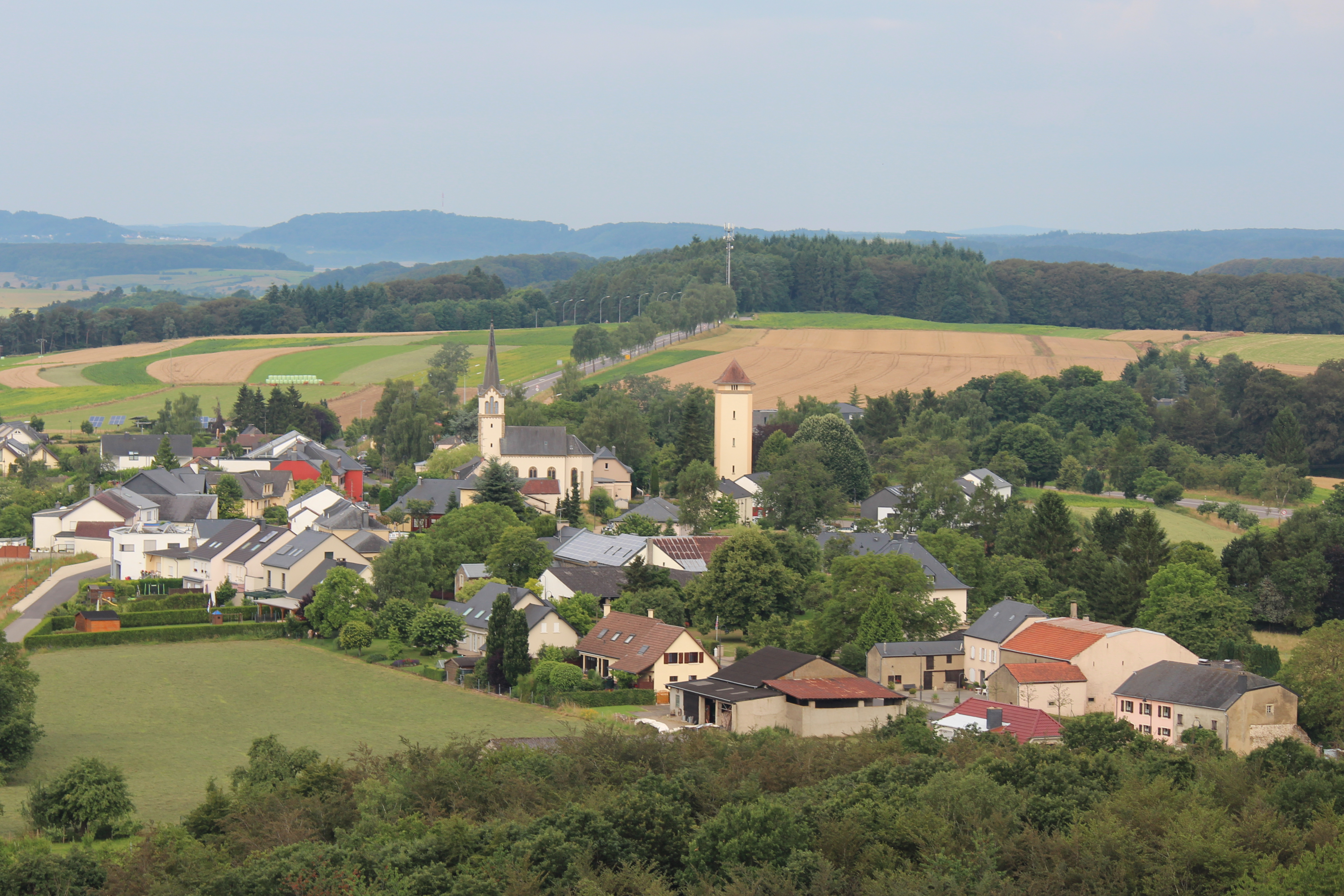
Altrier (2016).

Altrier (Luxembourgish: op der Schanz pronounced [opdɐˈʃɑnts]) is a village in the commune of Bech, in eastern Luxembourg. As of September 2026, the village had a population of 296.
