= Ritzing, Moselle =

Ritzing
- Part of Manderen-Ritzing
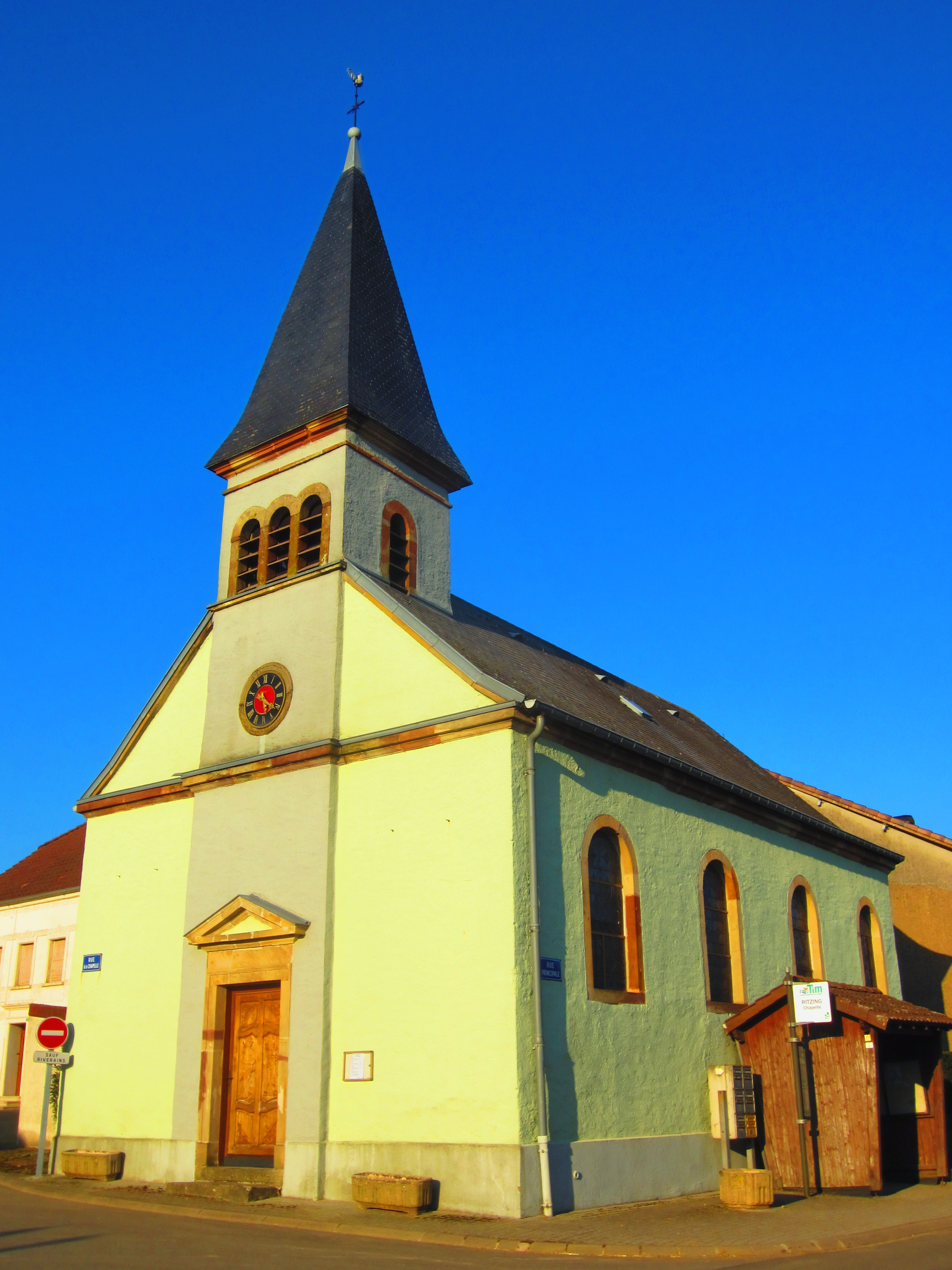
- The church in Ritzing

- Coat of arms
- Location of Ritzing
- Location within France Location within Grand Est
- Coordinates: 49°26′13″N 6°27′43″E
- Country: France
- Region: Grand Est
- Department: Moselle
- Arrondissement: Thionville
- Canton: Bouzonville
- Commune: Manderen-Ritzing
- Area^{1}: 6.15 km^{2} (2.37 sq mi)
- Elevation: 850 m (2,790 ft)
- Highest elevation: 398 m (1,306 ft)
- Lowest elevation: 284 m (932 ft)
- Population (2019): 181
  - Density: 29.4/km^{2} (76.2/sq mi)
- Time zone: UTC+01:00 (CET)
  - Summer (DST): UTC+02:00 (CEST)
- Postal code: 57480
- ^{1} French Land Register data, which excludes lakes, ponds, glaciers > 1 km^{2} (0.386 sq mi or 247 acres) and river estuaries.

Ritzing (German: Ritzingen, Luxembourgish: Réitzingen) is a former commune in the Moselle department in Grand Est in north-eastern France. On 1 January 2019, it was merged into the new commune Manderen-Ritzing.

== See also ==
- Communes of the Moselle department
