= Dalheim =

Dalheim Duelem
- Commune
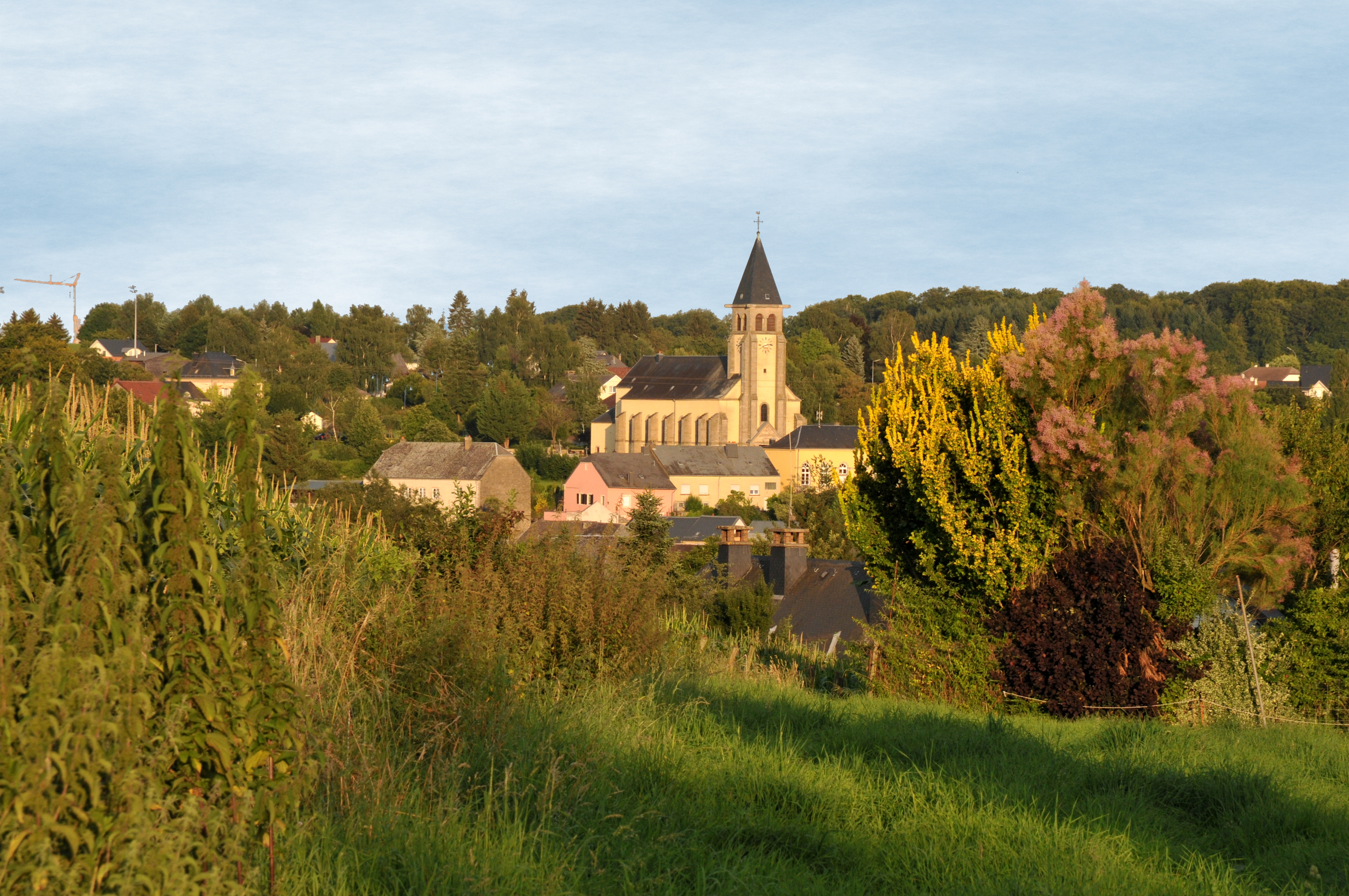

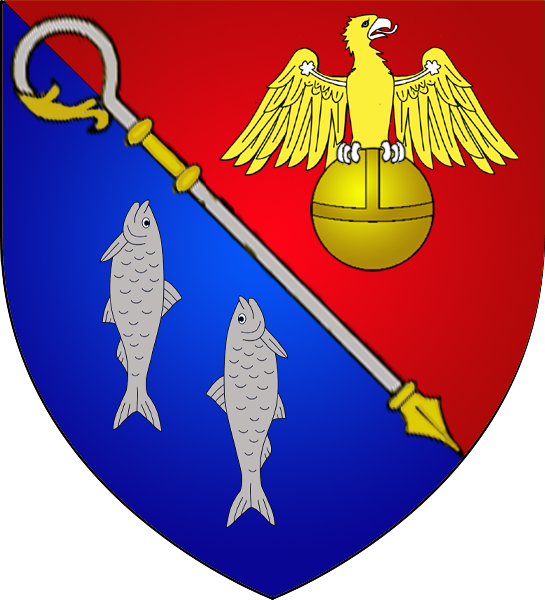
- Coat of arms

- Map of Luxembourg with Dalheim highlighted in orange, and the canton in dark red
- Coordinates: 49.5431°N 6.2583°E
- Country: Luxembourg
- Canton: Remich

Government
  - Mayor: Romain Kill (Independent)

Area
  - Total: 18.98 km^{2} (7.33 sq mi)
  - Rank: 61st of 100
- Highest elevation: 368 m (1,207 ft)
  - Rank: 74th of 100
- Lowest elevation: 167 m (548 ft)
  - Rank: 12th of 100

Population (2025)
  - Total: 2,388
  - Rank: 69th of 100
  - Density: 125.8/km^{2} (325.9/sq mi)
  - Rank: 60th of 100
- Time zone: UTC+1 (CET)
  - Summer (DST): UTC+2 (CEST)
- LAU 2: LU0001202
- Website: dalheim.lu

Dalheim (German pronunciation: [ˈdaːlhaɪm]; Luxembourgish: Duelem) is a commune and town in south-eastern Luxembourg. It is part of the canton of Remich, which is part of the district of Grevenmacher.

As of September 2026, the town of Dalheim, which lies in the centre of the commune, has a population of 1,560. Other towns within the commune include Filsdorf and Welfrange.

== Church ==
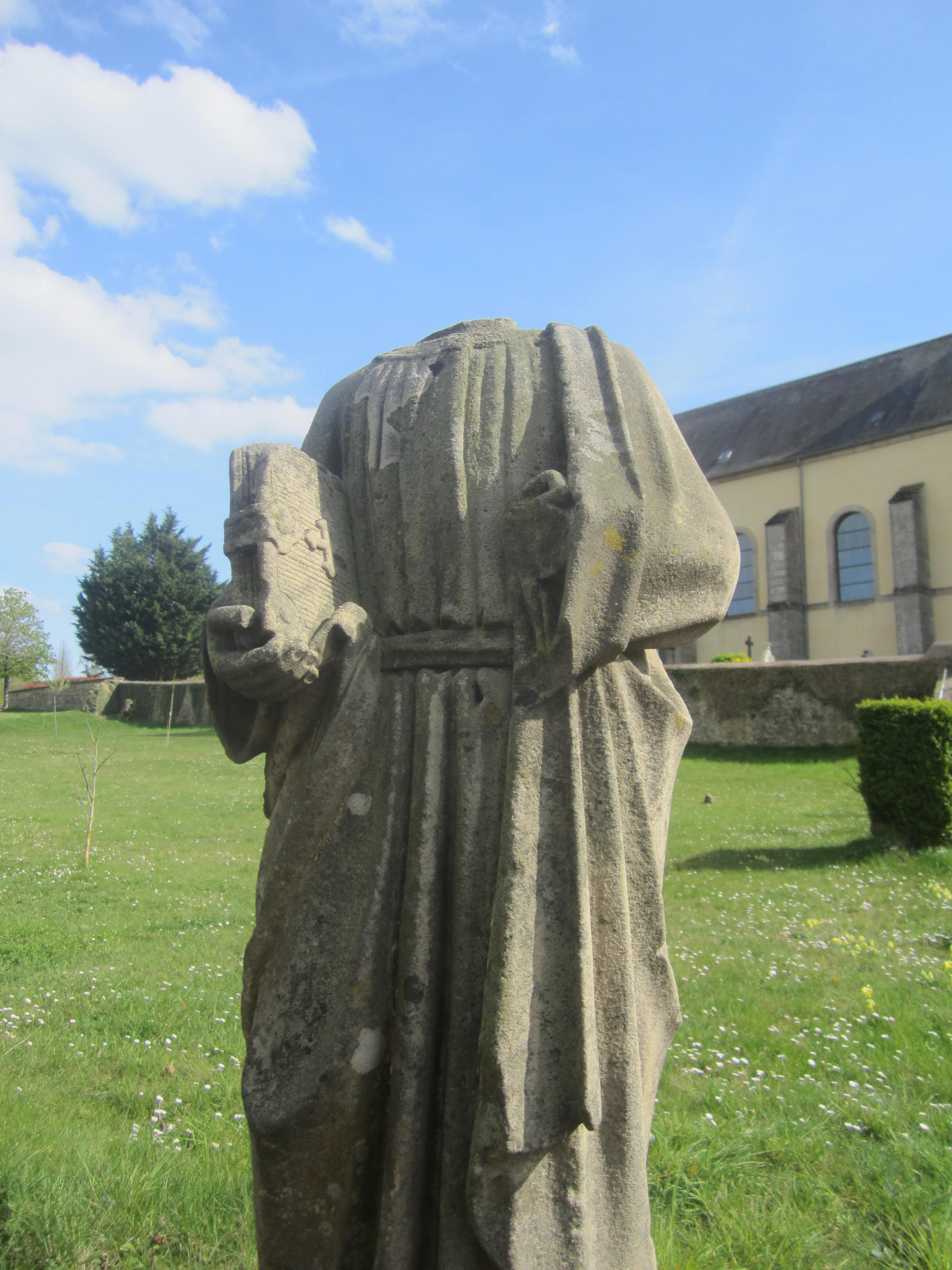
Decapitated statue of St Paul at Dalheim. The head was placed outside the presbytery door for the priest to find.

The church in Dalheim, built in 1743, is a Catholic church dedicated to Saints Peter and Paul. It is situated on the "Péiteschbierg" high above the village center. It is particularly distinguished by its unique frescoes from the second half of the 18th century (painted by the Luxembourgish artist Johann Georg Weiser) and statues of the two patron saints situated outside the church. However, in 2017, the statue of St Paul was decapitated and the head placed outside the front door of the presbytery. There has been press speculation that this incident occurred in order to intimidate the resident priest, Fr Jean-Marie Belanga. Both statues were removed shortly after the incident by the local administration for repairs. Fr Belanga, who had previously been stopped from preaching by the Archdiocese due to complaints about the conservative and Catholic nature of his homilies, was also subsequently removed from his position as parish priest in the village and told to leave Luxembourg. Fr Belanga was the first priest of African origin to serve as the parish priest of Dalheim.

== Roman Settlement ==
To the south of today's village of Dalheim, is evidence of a Roman settlement named Ricciacum, located on the highest point of a gentle slope facing south-west.

Ricciacum had impressive public buildings (theatre, thermal baths and temple), which gave it the attributes of a small Roman town. Some of these monuments can still be visited today.

== Population ==
Historical population

Year	Pop.	±%
1821	1,070	—
1851	1,510	+41.1%
1900	1,038	−31.3%
1910	1,086	+4.6%
1922	1,081	−0.5%
1935	956	−11.6%

Year	Pop.	±%
1947	869	−9.1%
1960	786	−9.6%
1970	814	+3.6%
1981	912	+12.0%
1990	1,007	+10.4%
2000	1,204	+19.6%

Year	Pop.	±%
2005	1,406	+16.8%
2010	1,654	+17.6%
2015	1,805	+9.1%
2020	2,017	+11.7%
2021	2,071	+2.7%

Source data

== Gallery ==
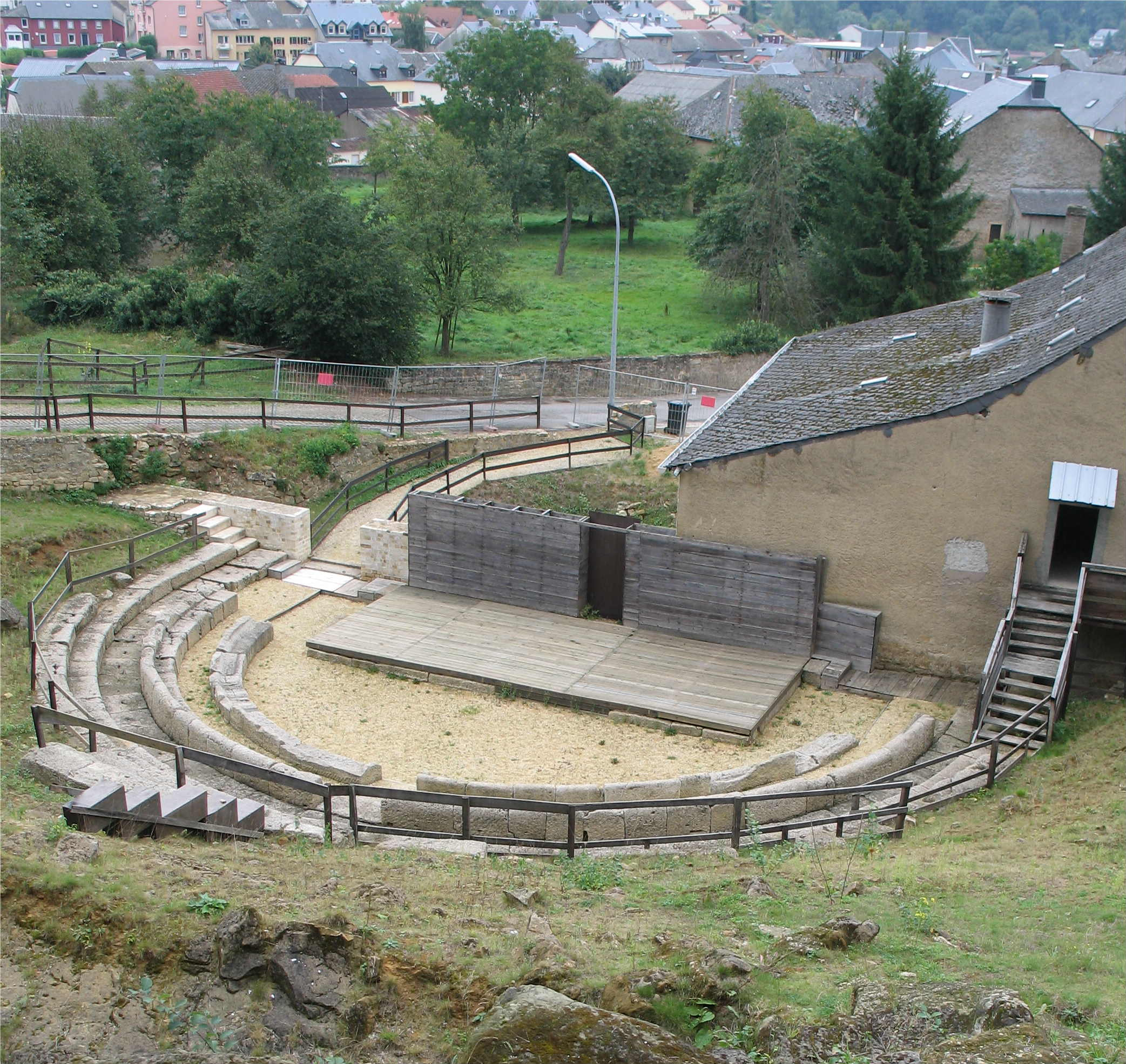
The ancient Roman theatre

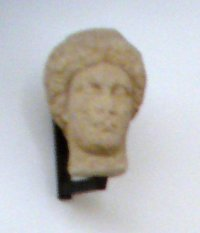
Rosmerta in the Musée national d’art et d’histoire de Luxembourg
