= List of communes of Luxembourg by elevation =

This is a sortable list of communes of Luxembourg by elevation. Cities are given in italics.

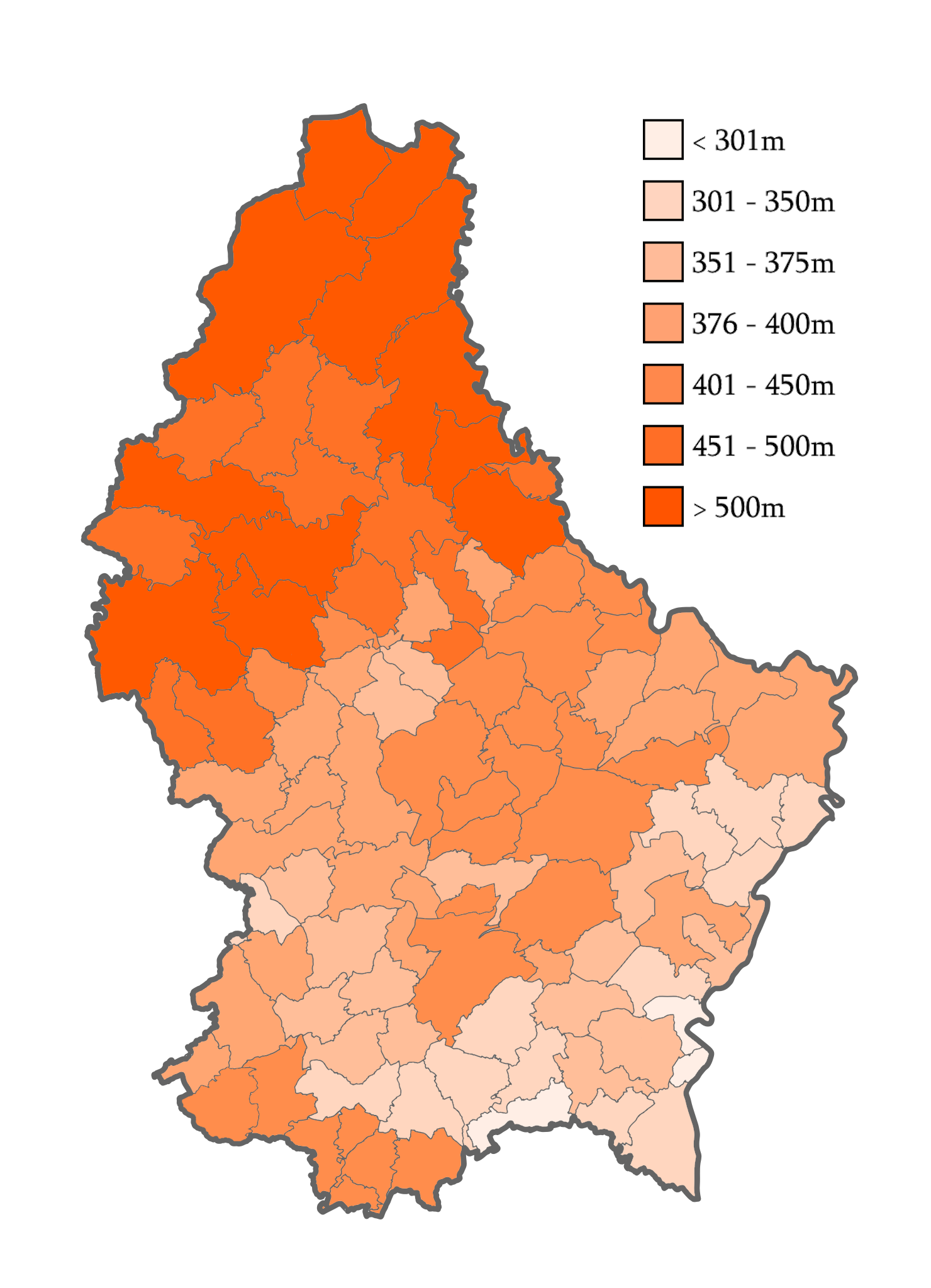
Map of communes shaded by elevation of the highest point. Higher elevation is reflected by darker shades of orange.

Rank	Name	Canton	Highest Point Elevation (m) (Situation as of 2025)
1	Troisvierges	Clervaux	560
2	Rambrouch	Redange	554
3	Clervaux	Clervaux	548
4	Groussbus-Wal	Redange	544
5	Putscheid	Vianden	542
6	Weiswampach	Clervaux	538
7	Lac de la Haute-Sûre	Wiltz	537
8	Tandel	Vianden	537
9	Parc Hosingen	Clervaux	535
10	Esch-sur-Sûre	Wiltz	529
11	Wincrange	Clervaux	528
12	Winseler	Wiltz	520
13	Wiltz	Wiltz	518
14	Schieren	Diekirch	515
15	Vianden	Vianden	515
16	Bourscheid	Diekirch	513
17	Ell	Redange	508
18	Goesdorf	Wiltz	498
19	Kiischpelt	Wiltz	498
20	Redange	Redange	493
21	Feulen	Diekirch	488
22	Boulaide	Wiltz	487
23	Erpeldange-sur-Sûre	Diekirch	459
24	Lorentzweiler	Mersch	436
25	Dudelange	Esch-sur-Alzette	435
26	Rumelange	Esch-sur-Alzette	432
27	Niederanven	Luxembourg	429
28	Mersch	Mersch	428
29	Differdange	Esch-sur-Alzette	427
30	Fischbach	Mersch	427
31	Esch-sur-Alzette	Esch-sur-Alzette	426
32	Kayl	Esch-sur-Alzette	425
33	Bettendorf	Diekirch	422
34	Sanem	Esch-sur-Alzette	422
35	Larochette	Mersch	420
36	Vallée de l'Ernz	Diekirch	420
37	Nommern	Mersch	417
38	Beaufort	Echternach	414
39	Lintgen	Mersch	414
40	Junglinster	Grevenmacher	411
41	Mertzig	Diekirch	409
42	Bech	Echternach	408
43	Reisdorf	Diekirch	406
44	Schifflange	Esch-sur-Alzette	406
45	Heffingen	Mersch	405
46	Walferdange	Luxembourg	405
47	Luxembourg-City	Luxembourg	402
48	Préizerdaul	Redange	402
49	Beckerich	Redange	400
50	Rosport-Mompach	Echternach	399
51	Garnich	Capellen	398
52	Pétange	Esch-sur-Alzette	397
53	Diekirch	Diekirch	396
54	Käerjeng	Capellen	395
55	Consdorf	Echternach	393
56	Echternach	Echternach	393
57	Helperknapp	Mersch	393
58	Kopstal	Capellen	392
59	Habscht	Capellen	391
60	Strassen	Luxembourg	391
61	Kehlen	Capellen	389
62	Flaxweiler	Grevenmacher	387
63	Waldbillig	Echternach	387
64	Berdorf	Echternach	384
65	Vichten	Redange	384
66	Sandweiler	Luxembourg	383
67	Ettelbruck	Diekirch	382
68	Saeul	Redange	382
69	Useldange	Redange	377
70	Schuttrange	Luxembourg	373
71	Steinsel	Luxembourg	373
72	Colmar-Berg	Mersch	372
73	Dalheim	Remich	368
74	Koerich	Capellen	368
75	Reckange-sur-Mess	Esch-sur-Alzette	368
76	Leudelange	Esch-sur-Alzette	359
77	Bous-Waldbredimus	Remich	359
78	Betzdorf	Grevenmacher	358
79	Bissen	Mersch	358
80	Contern	Luxembourg	356
81	Wormeldange	Grevenmacher	355
82	Mamer	Capellen	353
83	Bertrange	Luxembourg	352
84	Dippach	Capellen	352
85	Steinfort	Capellen	349
86	Manternach	Grevenmacher	341
87	Bettembourg	Esch-sur-Alzette	338
88	Mondercange	Esch-sur-Alzette	337
89	Hesperange	Luxembourg	334
90	Biwer	Grevenmacher	332
91	Weiler-la-Tour	Luxembourg	329
92	Mertert	Grevenmacher	325
93	Lenningen	Remich	321
94	Mondorf-les-Bains	Remich	317
95	Grevenmacher	Grevenmacher	315
96	Roeser	Esch-sur-Alzette	311
97	Schengen	Remich	302
98	Frisange	Esch-sur-Alzette	293
99	Stadtbredimus	Remich	289
100	Remich	Remich	253

== See also ==
- List of communes of Luxembourg by area
- List of communes of Luxembourg by population
- List of communes of Luxembourg by population density
