= List of communes of Luxembourg =

As of 2023, Luxembourg has 100 communes.

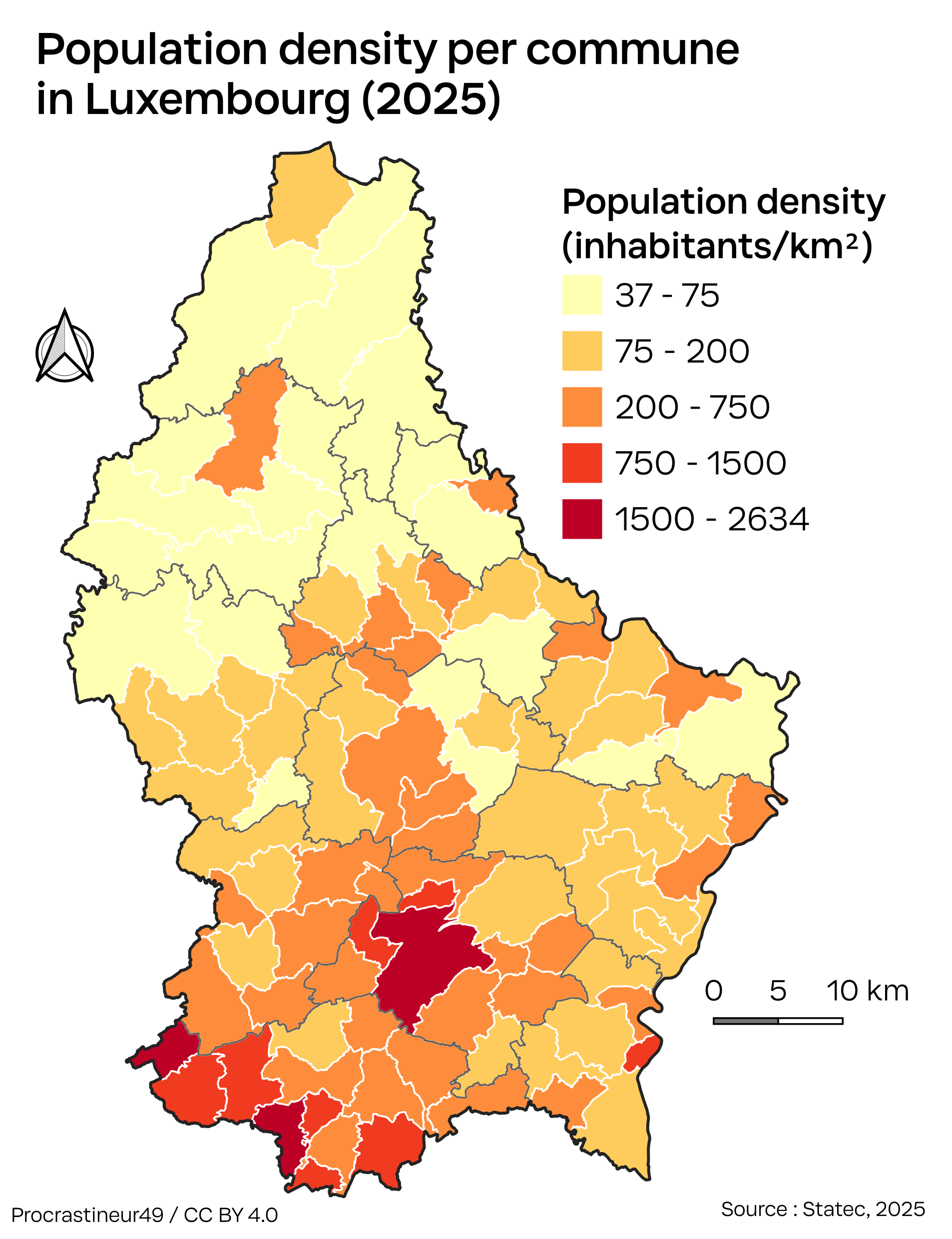
Map of communes shaded by population density. Greater population density is reflected by darker shades of red.

Communes shaded by population in 2018. Greater population is reflected by darker shades of blue.

This is a list of the 100 communes of Luxembourg, a basic administrative division in Luxembourg, (Note: Luxembourg City and Esch-sur-Alzette are further subdivided into 24 and 16 municipal quarters respectively.) of which each canton is required to contain at least one. Communes with town status are listed in italics.

== List ==
‡ National capital

Name Luxembourgish name	Canton	Population (2026)	Area		Population density
Name Luxembourgish name	Canton	Population (2026)	km^{2}	mi^{2}	Population density
Beaufort Beefort	Echternach	3,102	13.74	5.31	225.8/km^{2} (584.7/sq mi)
Bech Bech	Echternach	1,370	23.31	9.00	58.8/km^{2} (152.2/sq mi)
Beckerich Biekerech	Redange	2,913	28.41	10.97	102.5/km^{2} (265.6/sq mi)
Berdorf Bäerdref	Echternach	2,293	21.93	8.47	104.6/km^{2} (270.8/sq mi)
Bertrange Bartreng	Luxembourg	9,489	17.39	6.71	545.7/km^{2} (1,413.2/sq mi)
Bettembourg Beetebuerg	Esch-sur-Alzette	11,651	21.49	8.30	542.2/km^{2} (1,404.2/sq mi)
Bettendorf Bettenduerf	Diekirch	3,051	23.24	8.97	131.3/km^{2} (340.0/sq mi)
Betzdorf Betzder	Grevenmacher	4,127	26.08	10.07	158.2/km^{2} (409.8/sq mi)
Bissen Biissen	Mersch	3,564	20.75	8.01	171.8/km^{2} (444.9/sq mi)
Biwer Biwer	Grevenmacher	1,902	23.08	8.91	82.4/km^{2} (213.4/sq mi)
Boulaide Bauschelt	Wiltz	1,579	32.13	12.41	49.1/km^{2} (127.3/sq mi)
Bourscheid Buerschent	Diekirch	1,784	36.86	14.23	48.4/km^{2} (125.4/sq mi)
Bous-Waldbredimus Bous-Waldbriedemes	Remich	3,368	28	11	120.3/km^{2} (311.5/sq mi)
Clervaux Klierf	Clervaux	6,327	85.05	32.84	74.4/km^{2} (192.7/sq mi)
Colmar-Berg Colmer-Bierg	Mersch	2,471	12.31	4.75	200.7/km^{2} (519.9/sq mi)
Consdorf Konsdref	Echternach	2,093	25.72	9.93	81.4/km^{2} (210.8/sq mi)
Contern Conter	Luxembourg	5,006	20.55	7.93	243.6/km^{2} (630.9/sq mi)
Dalheim Duelem	Remich	2,377	18.98	7.33	125.2/km^{2} (324.4/sq mi)
Diekirch Dikrech	Diekirch	7,398	12.42	4.80	595.7/km^{2} (1,542.7/sq mi)
Differdange Déifferdeng	Esch-sur-Alzette	31,421	22.18	8.56	1,416.6/km^{2} (3,669.1/sq mi)
Dippach Dippech	Capellen	4,721	17.42	6.73	271.0/km^{2} (701.9/sq mi)
Dudelange Diddeleng	Esch-sur-Alzette	22,379	21.38	8.25	1,046.7/km^{2} (2,711.0/sq mi)
Echternach Iechternach	Echternach	6,031	20.49	7.91	294.3/km^{2} (762.3/sq mi)
Ell Ell	Redange	1,668	21.55	8.32	77.4/km^{2} (200.5/sq mi)
Erpeldange-sur-Sûre Ierpeldeng op der Sauer	Diekirch	2,662	17.97	6.94	148.1/km^{2} (383.7/sq mi)
Esch-sur-Alzette Esch-Uelzecht	Esch-sur-Alzette	38,275	14.35	5.54	2,667.2/km^{2} (6,908.1/sq mi)
Esch-sur-Sûre Esch-Sauer	Wiltz	3,373	51.26	19.79	65.8/km^{2} (170.4/sq mi)
Ettelbruck Ettelbréck	Diekirch	10,212	15.18	5.86	672.7/km^{2} (1,742.4/sq mi)
Feulen Feelen	Diekirch	2,431	22.76	8.79	106.8/km^{2} (276.6/sq mi)
Fischbach Fëschbech	Mersch	1,344	19.61	7.57	68.5/km^{2} (177.5/sq mi)
Flaxweiler Fluessweiler	Grevenmacher	2,268	30.17	11.65	75.2/km^{2} (194.7/sq mi)
Frisange Fréiseng	Esch-sur-Alzette	5,039	18.43	7.12	273.4/km^{2} (708.1/sq mi)
Garnich Garnech	Capellen	2,421	20.95	8.09	115.6/km^{2} (299.3/sq mi)
Goesdorf Géisdref	Wiltz	1,682	29.41	11.36	57.2/km^{2} (148.1/sq mi)
Grevenmacher Gréiwemaacher	Grevenmacher	5,297	16.48	6.36	321.4/km^{2} (832.5/sq mi)
Groussbus-Wal Groussbus-Wal	Redange	2,390	39.85	15.39	60.0/km^{2} (155.3/sq mi)
Habscht Habscht	Capellen	5,337	32.51	12.55	164.2/km^{2} (425.2/sq mi)
Heffingen Hiefenech	Mersch	1,597	13.34	5.15	119.7/km^{2} (310.1/sq mi)
Helperknapp Helperknapp	Mersch	5,326	37.61	14.52	141.6/km^{2} (366.8/sq mi)
Hesperange Hesper	Luxembourg	17,264	27.22	10.51	634.2/km^{2} (1,642.7/sq mi)
Junglinster Jonglënster	Grevenmacher	9,139	55.38	21.38	165.0/km^{2} (427.4/sq mi)
Käerjeng Käerjeng	Capellen	11,343	33.67	13.00	336.9/km^{2} (872.5/sq mi)
Kayl Keel	Esch-sur-Alzette	9,989	14.86	5.74	672.2/km^{2} (1,741.0/sq mi)
Kehlen Kielen	Capellen	7,449	28.18	10.88	264.3/km^{2} (684.6/sq mi)
Kiischpelt Kiischpelt	Wiltz	1,309	33.58	12.97	39.0/km^{2} (101.0/sq mi)
Koerich Käerch	Capellen	2,814	18.88	7.29	149.0/km^{2} (386.0/sq mi)
Kopstal Koplescht	Capellen	4,740	7.9	3.1	600.0/km^{2} (1,554.0/sq mi)
Lac de la Haute-Sûre Stauséigemeng	Wiltz	2,320	48.5	18.7	47.8/km^{2} (123.9/sq mi)
Larochette Fiels	Mersch	2,241	15.4	5.9	145.5/km^{2} (376.9/sq mi)
Lenningen Lenneng	Remich	2,114	20.35	7.86	103.9/km^{2} (269.1/sq mi)
Leudelange Leideleng	Esch-sur-Alzette	2,765	13.57	5.24	203.8/km^{2} (527.7/sq mi)
Lintgen Lëntgen	Mersch	3,484	15.25	5.89	228.5/km^{2} (591.7/sq mi)
Lorentzweiler Luerenzweiler	Mersch	4,760	17.45	6.74	272.8/km^{2} (706.5/sq mi)
Luxembourg City ‡ Lëtzebuerg	Luxembourg	137,678	51.46	19.87	2,675.4/km^{2} (6,929.4/sq mi)
Mamer Mamer	Capellen	11,583	27.54	10.63	420.6/km^{2} (1,089.3/sq mi)
Manternach Manternach	Grevenmacher	2,340	27.68	10.69	84.5/km^{2} (219.0/sq mi)
Mersch Miersch	Mersch	10,888	49.74	19.20	218.9/km^{2} (566.9/sq mi)
Mertert Mäertert	Grevenmacher	5,685	15.25	5.89	372.8/km^{2} (965.5/sq mi)
Mertzig Mäerzeg	Diekirch	2,435	11.1	4.3	219.4/km^{2} (568.2/sq mi)
Mondercange Monnerech	Esch-sur-Alzette	7,312	21.4	8.3	341.7/km^{2} (885.0/sq mi)
Mondorf-les-Bains Munneref	Remich	5,524	13.66	5.27	404.4/km^{2} (1,047.4/sq mi)
Niederanven Nidderaanwen	Luxembourg	7,161	41.36	15.97	173.1/km^{2} (448.4/sq mi)
Nommern Noumer	Mersch	1,516	22.44	8.66	67.6/km^{2} (175.0/sq mi)
Parc Hosingen Parc Housen	Clervaux	4,407	70.65	27.28	62.4/km^{2} (161.6/sq mi)
Pétange Péiteng	Esch-sur-Alzette	21,290	11.93	4.61	1,784.6/km^{2} (4,622.0/sq mi)
Préizerdaul Préizerdaul	Redange	1,802	15.6	6.0	115.5/km^{2} (299.2/sq mi)
Putscheid Pëtschent	Vianden	1,191	27.13	10.47	43.9/km^{2} (113.7/sq mi)
Rambrouch Rammerech	Redange	5,064	79.09	30.54	64.0/km^{2} (165.8/sq mi)
Reckange-sur-Mess Reckeng op der Mess	Esch-sur-Alzette	2,957	20.42	7.88	144.8/km^{2} (375.1/sq mi)
Redange-sur-Attert Réiden op der Attert	Redange	3,149	31.95	12.34	98.6/km^{2} (255.3/sq mi)
Reisdorf Reisduerf	Diekirch	1,422	14.84	5.73	95.8/km^{2} (248.2/sq mi)
Remich Réimech	Remich	4,156	5.29	2.04	785.6/km^{2} (2,034.8/sq mi)
Roeser Réiser	Esch-sur-Alzette	7,184	23.8	9.2	301.8/km^{2} (781.8/sq mi)
Rosport-Mompach Rouspert-Mompech	Echternach	3,795	57.07	22.03	66.5/km^{2} (172.2/sq mi)
Rumelange Rëmeleng	Esch-sur-Alzette	5,767	6.83	2.64	844.4/km^{2} (2,186.9/sq mi)
Saeul Sëll	Redange	1,081	14.86	5.74	72.7/km^{2} (188.4/sq mi)
Sandweiler Sandweiler	Luxembourg	3,872	7.73	2.98	500.9/km^{2} (1,297.3/sq mi)
Sanem Suessem	Esch-sur-Alzette	19,611	24.42	9.43	803.1/km^{2} (2,079.9/sq mi)
Schengen Schengen	Remich	5,265	31.42	12.13	167.6/km^{2} (434.0/sq mi)
Schieren Schieren	Diekirch	2,172	10.41	4.02	208.6/km^{2} (540.4/sq mi)
Schifflange Schëffleng	Esch-sur-Alzette	11,674	7.71	2.98	1,514.1/km^{2} (3,921.6/sq mi)
Schuttrange Schëtter	Luxembourg	4,500	16.1	6.2	279.5/km^{2} (723.9/sq mi)
Stadtbredimus Stadbriedemes	Remich	2,023	10.17	3.93	198.9/km^{2} (515.2/sq mi)
Steinfort Stengefort	Capellen	6,154	12.16	4.70	506.1/km^{2} (1,310.8/sq mi)
Steinsel Steesel	Luxembourg	6,186	21.81	8.42	283.6/km^{2} (734.6/sq mi)
Strassen Stroossen	Luxembourg	10,831	10.71	4.14	1,011.3/km^{2} (2,619.2/sq mi)
Tandel Tandel	Vianden	2,374	41.72	16.11	56.9/km^{2} (147.4/sq mi)
Troisvierges Ëlwen	Clervaux	3,708	37.86	14.62	97.9/km^{2} (253.7/sq mi)
Useldange Useldeng	Redange	2,181	23.92	9.24	91.2/km^{2} (236.2/sq mi)
Vallée de l'Ernz Äerenzdallgemeng	Diekirch	2,963	39.73	15.34	74.6/km^{2} (193.2/sq mi)
Vianden Veianen	Vianden	2,243	9.67	3.73	232.0/km^{2} (600.8/sq mi)
Vichten Viichten	Redange	1,453	12.26	4.73	118.5/km^{2} (307.0/sq mi)
Waldbillig Waldbëlleg	Echternach	1,999	23.28	8.99	85.9/km^{2} (222.4/sq mi)
Walferdange Walfer	Luxembourg	9,256	7.06	2.73	1,311.0/km^{2} (3,395.6/sq mi)
Weiler-la-Tour Weiler zum Tuer	Luxembourg	2,523	17.07	6.59	147.8/km^{2} (382.8/sq mi)
Weiswampach Wäiswampech	Clervaux	2,699	35.25	13.61	76.6/km^{2} (198.3/sq mi)
Wiltz Wolz	Wiltz	8,538	39.25	15.15	217.5/km^{2} (563.4/sq mi)
Wincrange Wëntger	Clervaux	5,038	113.36	43.77	44.4/km^{2} (115.1/sq mi)
Winseler Wanseler	Wiltz	1,590	30.42	11.75	52.3/km^{2} (135.4/sq mi)
Wormeldange Wuermer	Grevenmacher	3,249	17.25	6.66	188.3/km^{2} (487.8/sq mi)

== See also ==
- List of communes of Luxembourg by elevation
