= Haut-Martelange =

Village in Luxembourg

Coordinates: 49°49′28″N 5°44′59″E

Haut-Martelange Uewermaartel
- Village
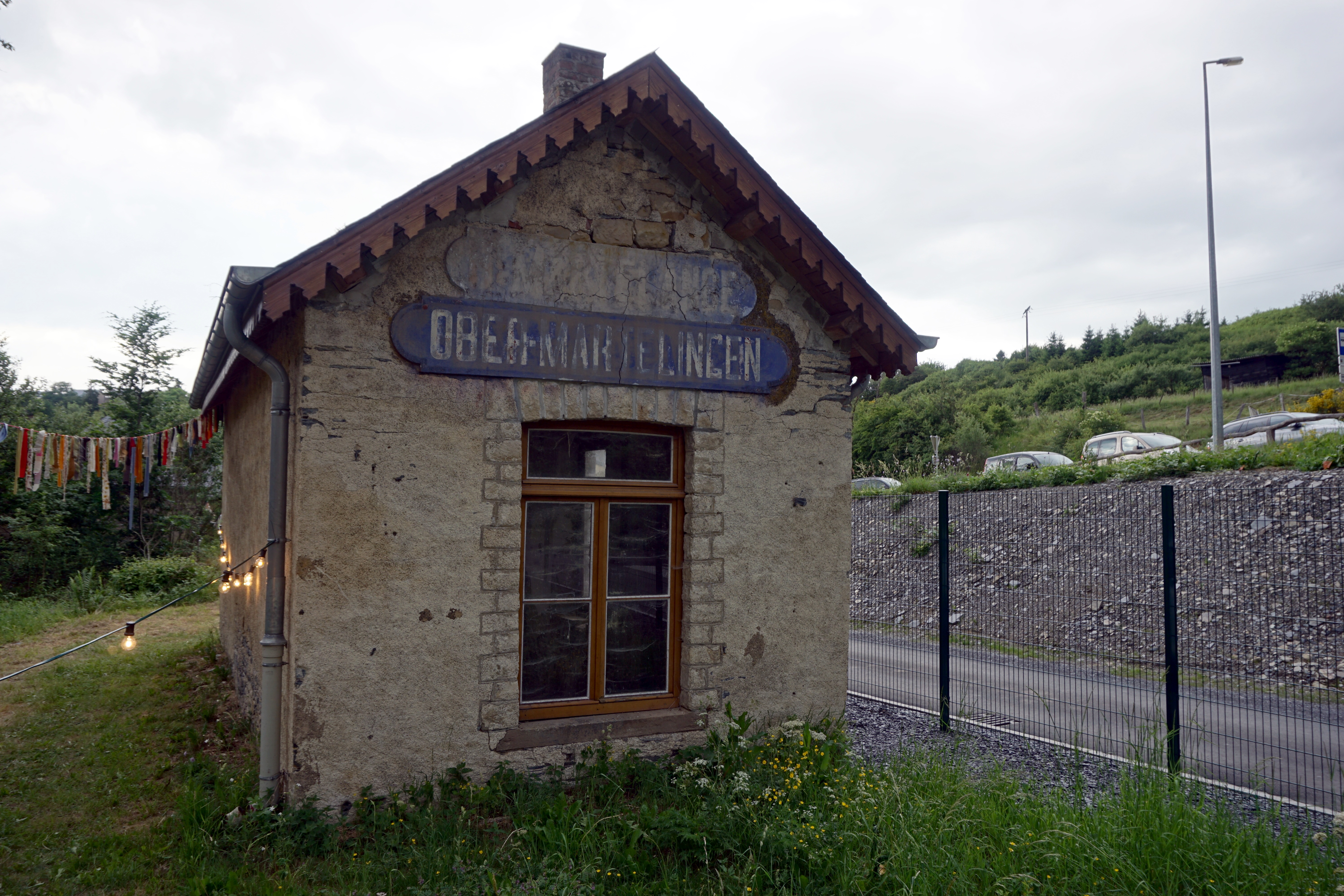
- Disused railway station
- Interactive map of Haut-Martelange
- Country: Luxembourg
- Canton: Redange
- Commune: Rambrouch

Population
  - Total: 16
- Time zone: UTC+1 (CET)
  - Summer (DST): UTC+2 (CEST)

Haut-Martelange (French pronunciation: [o maʁtəlɑ̃ʒ]; Luxembourgish: Uewermaartel; German: Obermartelingen [ˈoːbɐˌmaʁtəlɪŋən]; all lit. 'Upper Martelange/Maartel/Martelingen', in contrast to Martelange/Maartel/Martelingen) is a village in northwestern Luxembourg.

It is situated in the commune of Rambrouch, right along the border with Belgium.

As of 2026, it has a population of 16.

== Slate industry ==
During the 19th century, mines in Haut-Martelange were one of the main exporters of slate in Europe.

The village of Haut-Martelange formed around underground slate mines, which were established towards the end of the 17th century in the valley Haut-Martelange is located in.

The importance of the site grew significantly after investments were made by the Rother family from Frankfurt. The connection of Haut-Martelange to the Noerdange-Martelange railway line (Jhangeli) in 1890 gave the possibility for high-volume exports to the whole of Europe.

During this time, the slate mines of Haut-Martelange accounted for a significant amount of Luxembourg's exports and were a major provider of labour in the region. The underground mines grew to become among the most important in Europe.

The extraction of slate stopped in 1986 after the death of Christiane Rother in 1985, the last descendant of the Rother family.

Today, a museum has been established in the disused slate facilities.

== In popular culture ==
The 2015 film Colonia, starring Emma Watson and Daniel Brühl, was partly shot in the village, with the slate museum serving as a backdrop to the Chilean torture camp in which the film is set.

== Gallery ==
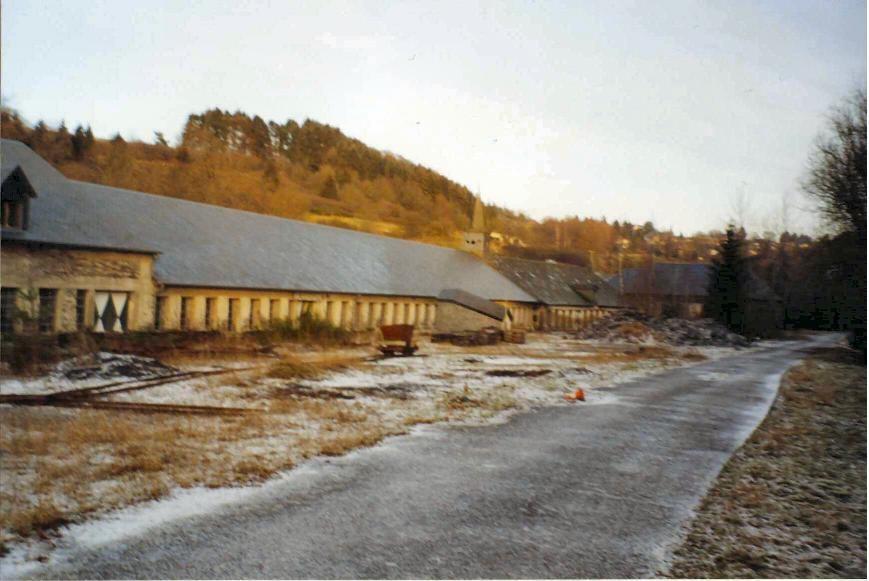
Slate mine in Haut-Martelange

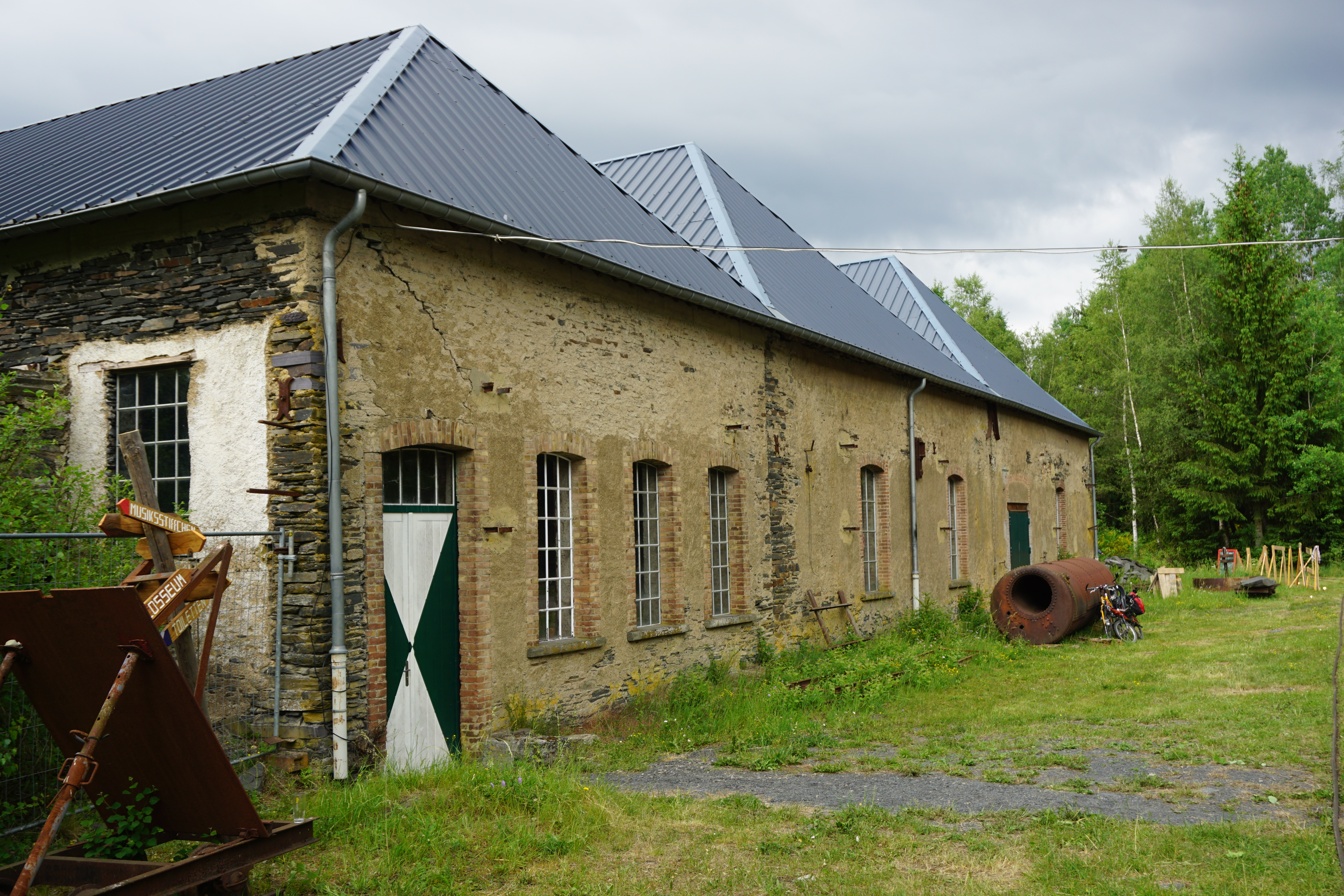

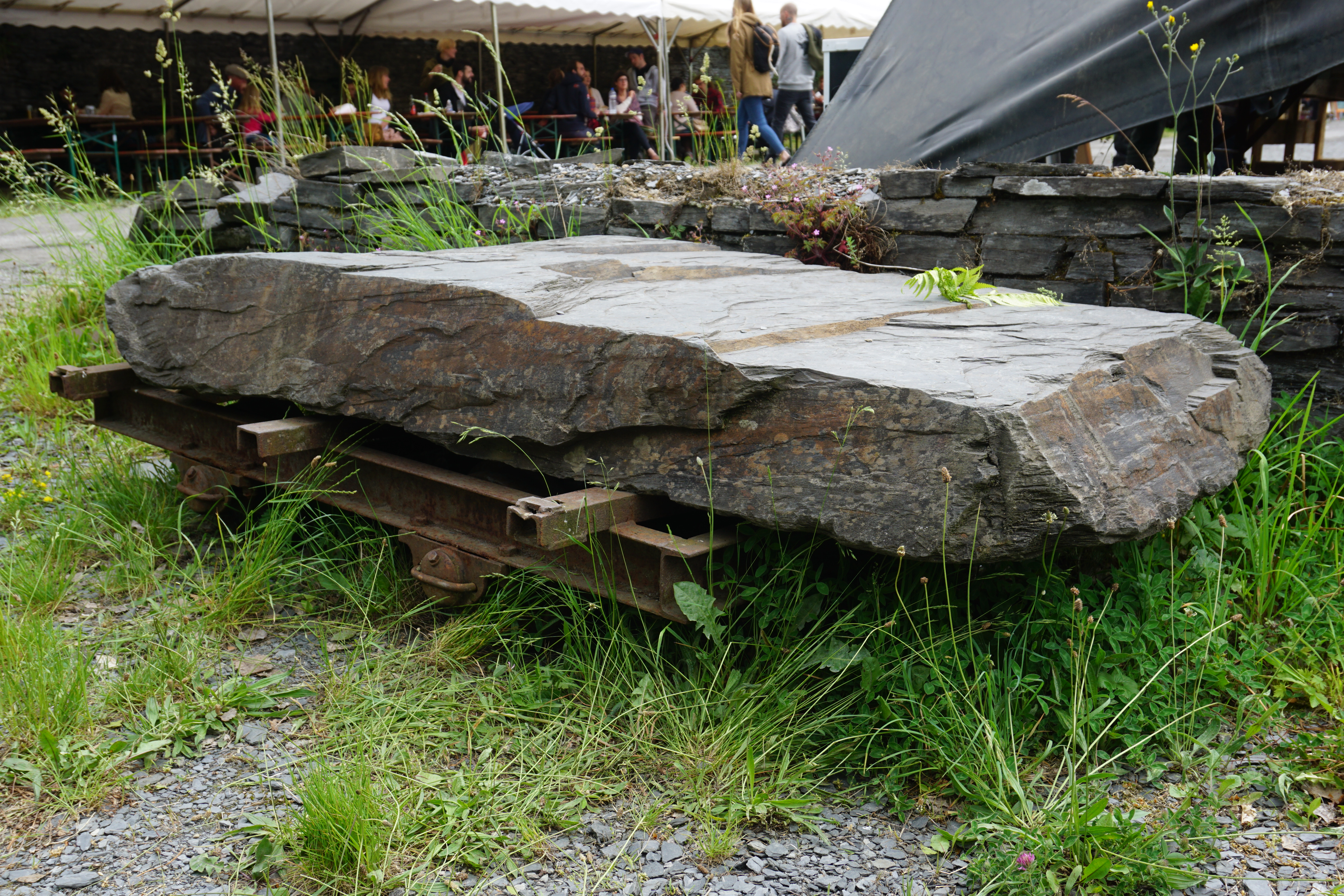

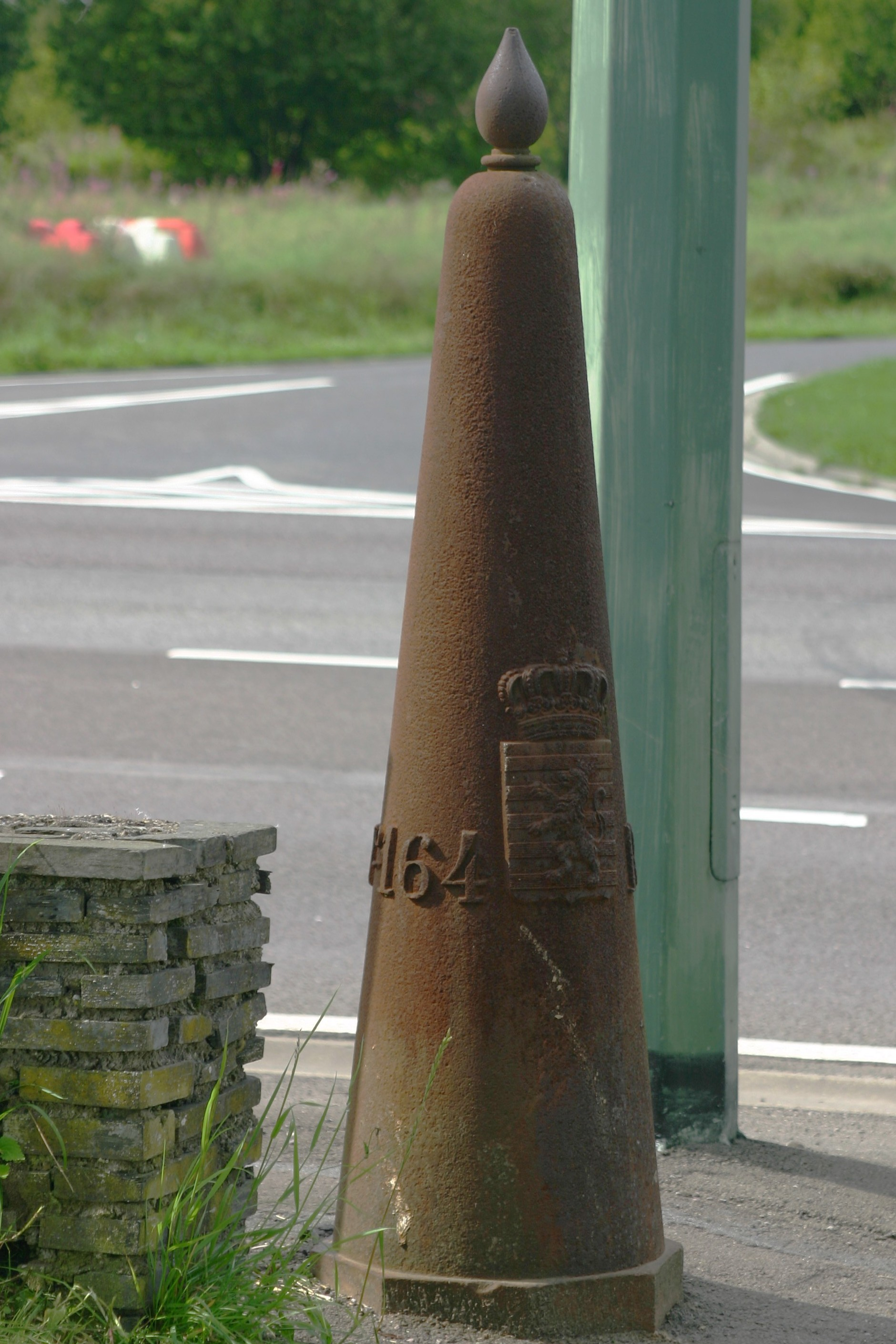
Border mark along the international border with Belgium
