= Canton of Redange =

Canton of Redange Kanton Réiden (Luxembourgish) Canton de Redange (French)
- Canton
- Coat of arms

- Coordinates: 49°48′N 5°48′E
- Country: Luxembourg
- Legislative constituency: Nord
- LAU 1: LU00007
- Communes (cities in bold): Beckerich; Ell; Groussbus-Wal; Préizerdaul; Rambrouch; Redange; Saeul; Useldange; Vichten

Area
  - Total: 267.5 km^{2} (103.3 sq mi)
  - Rank: 2nd of 12
- Highest elevation (2nd of 12): 554 m (1,818 ft)
- Lowest elevation (10th of 12): 232 m (761 ft)

Population (2026)
  - Total: 21,701
  - Rank: 9th of 12
  - Density: 81.13/km^{2} (210.1/sq mi)
  - Rank: 9th of 12

Redange (Luxembourgish: Réiden) is a canton in the northwest of Luxembourg. Its namesake commune is Redange, officially known as Redange-sur-Attert. It borders the cantons of Wiltz to the north, Diekirch and Mersch to the east, Capellen to the south and Belgium to the west (Province de Luxembourg).

== Geography ==
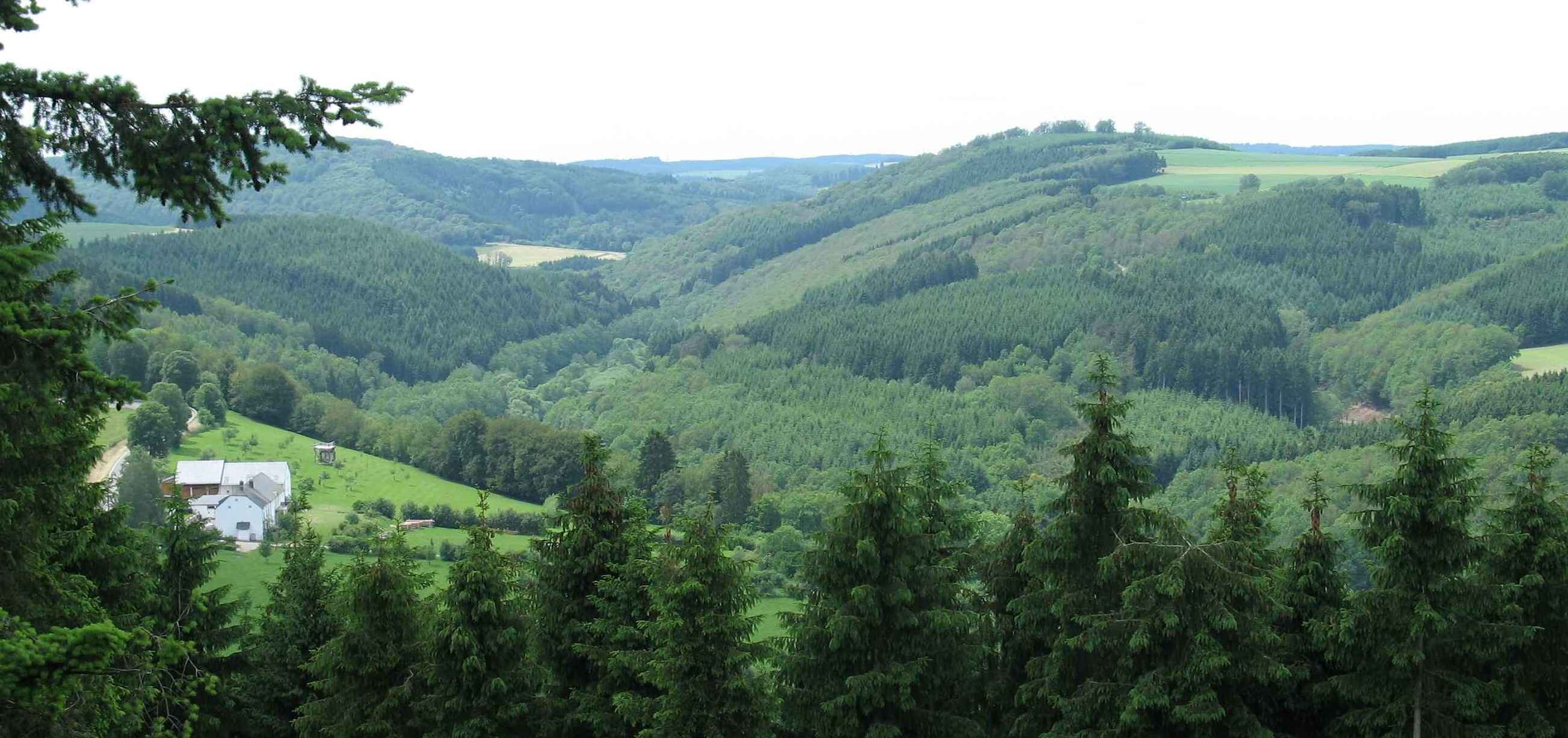
Typical Oesling landscape near Ferme Misère, commune of Rambrouch, canton of Redange

The canton lies right on the border of the two main landscapes of Luxembourg.

To the north, the landscape is dominated by the Oesling mountain range, which is a part of the greater Ardennes region. This region is characterised by densely forested hills with an average altitude of 400 to 500m above sealevel, with the highest point being Napoléonsgaard standing at 554m.

Furthermore this region shows deep valleys which were carved into the ground by rivers and streams, the Sauer and Wark being the most notable ones. The upper Sûre lake reservoir also lies partly within the Canton of Redange, at the border with the Canton of Wiltz.

The Oesling part of the Canton mainly comprises the communes of Rambrouch and Groussbus-Wal with the communes of Ell, Redange and Préitzerdaul partly being situated in the Oesling region.

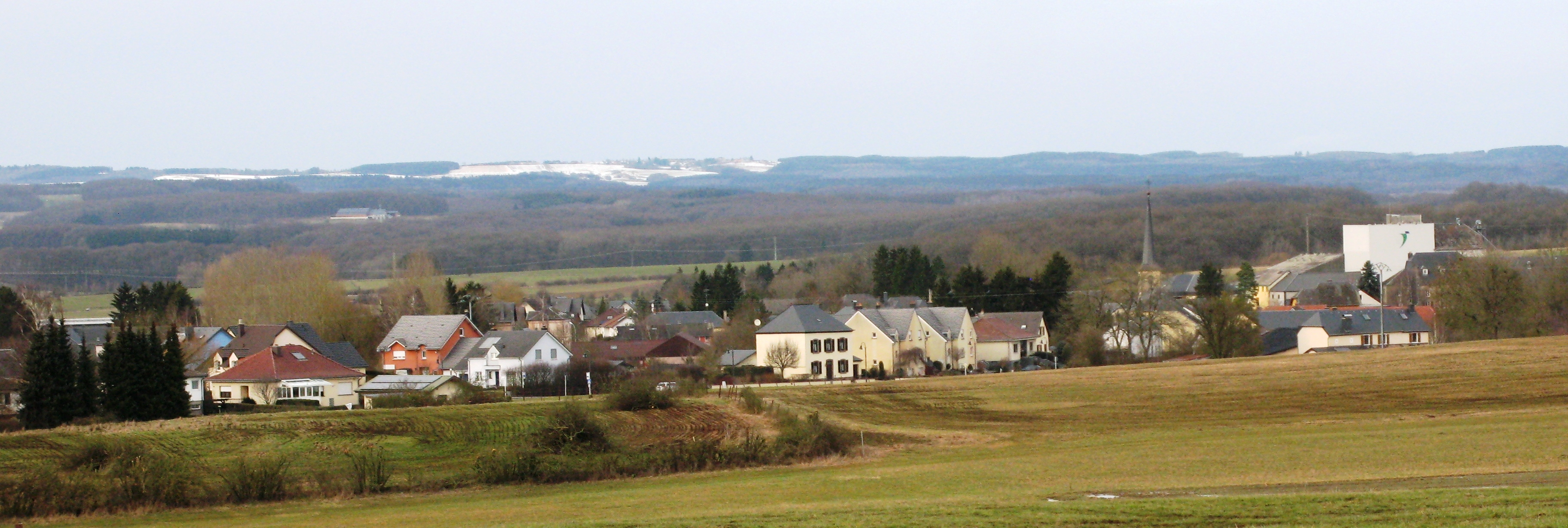
Flat Gutland plain near Noerdange (commune of Beckerich), with the snow-capped tops of the Oesling rising on the horizon

To the south, the landscape is dominated by the Gutland plain. This area is characterised by lower altitudes, averaging at around 300m above sealevel.

Wide shallow river valleys dominate the landscape with less forest coverage than in the north. The most important river in this region is the Attert.

The communes lying in the Gutland part of the Canton are Beckerich, Saeul, Useldange, and Vichten.

=== Urbanisation and Infrastructure ===
The canton of Redange has a rural character. The only major town with more than 1'000 inhabitants is Redange-sur-Attert, the capital of the canton. Most infrastructure is therefore concentrated around the capital. Here a secondary school, supermarkets and a retirement home can be found.

Furthermore, there is a high concentration of gas stations linked to fuel tourism along the border with Belgium, in towns such as Haut-Martelange and Oberpallen.

==== Transportation ====
The canton of Redange is not connected to Luxembourg's national railway network.

By road, the canton of Redange is linked to various routes nationales, for example the N12 between Luxembourg City and Wiltz, or between Arlon (B) and Ettelbruck. Furthermore, the canton is covered by an extensive public bus network, which is a part of the Régime général des transports routiers (RGTR).

=== Administrative divisions ===
Redange Canton consists of the following nine communes:

- Beckerich
- Groussbus-Wal
- Rambrouch
- Saeul
- Vichten
- Ell
- Préitzerdaul
- Redange
- Useldange

==== Mergers ====
- On 25 July 1846 the former commune of Oberpallen was absorbed into the commune of Beckerich.
- On 1 January 1979 the former communes of Arsdorf, Bigonville, Folschette and Perlé (all from Redange Canton) were merged to create the commune of Rambrouch. The law creating Rambrouch was passed on 27 July 1978.
- On 27 July 2021 the inhabitants of the communes of Grosbous and Wahl voted in favor of a fusion of the two communes in a referendum. The fusion was implemented on 1 September 2023, creating the new commune of Groussbus-Wal

== History ==
There have been human settlements in the modern day region of the canton of Redange since antiquity.

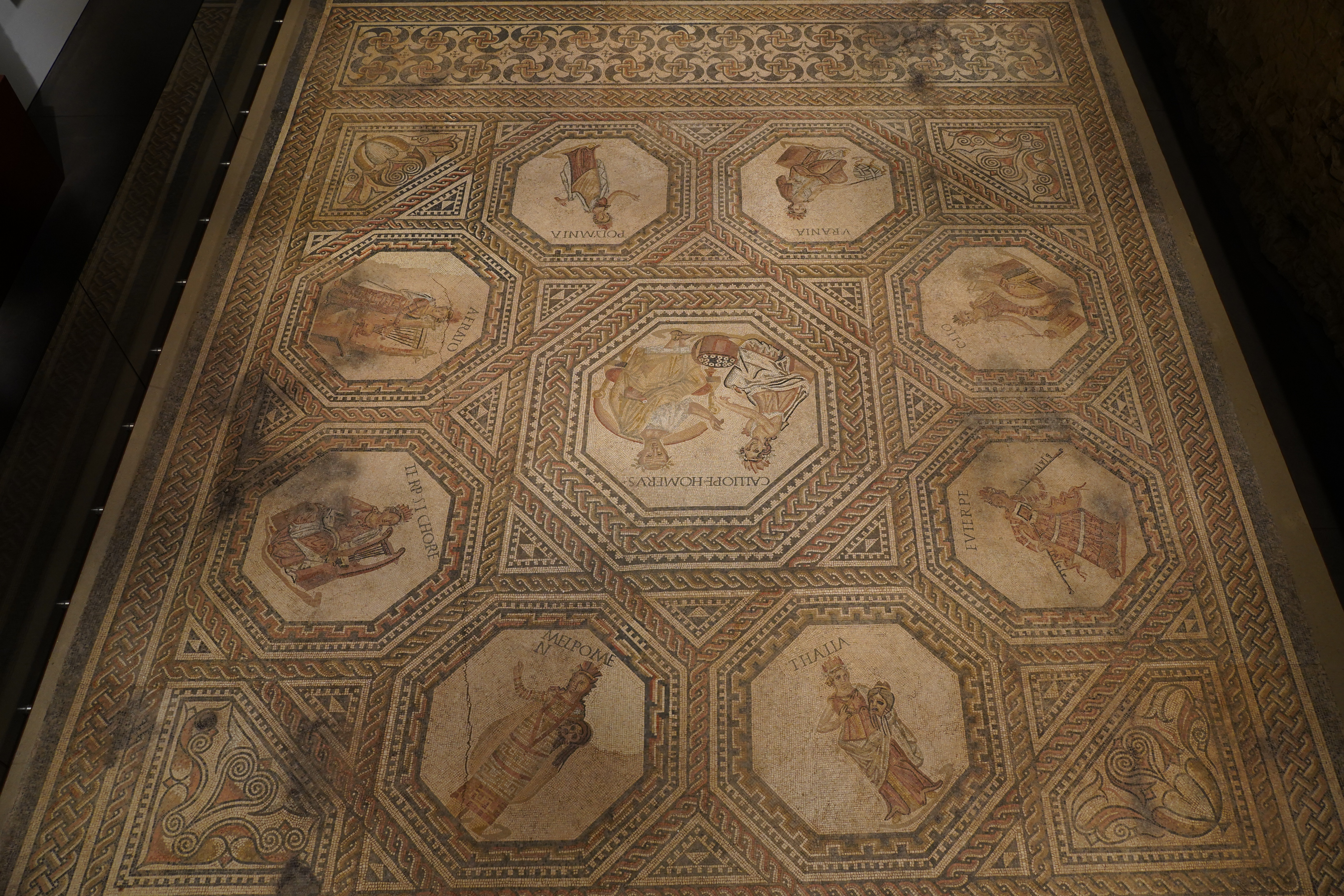
The Vichten mosaic

=== Gallo-Roman period ===
The most important archeological discovery in the canton of Redange from the Gallo-Roman period is a 10.36 × 5.92m mosaic that was discovered in 1994 in Vichten, in the east of the canton.

The mosaic was part of the floor in the entrance hall of a villa rustica and depicts the nine muses alongside the Greek poet Homer. It was most likely created around 240 AD.

Furthermore, numerous other archaeological sites can be fount throughout the canton, for example in Rippweiler, Hovelange and Schandel, among others.

=== Middle Ages ===
During the Middle Ages, the territory of the canton of Redange was part of the Duchy of Luxembourg, and was ruled by numerous lords and counts, who resided in castles dotted all around the canton. Even today, many ruins of castles can be found across the canton, the most notable one being Useldange castle.

=== French revolution and establishment of the canton ===
During the French revolution, the Duchy of Luxembourg was incorporated into the French Republic as part of the Département des Forêts. Following multiple territorial reforms, communes were established, and in October 1796 the Département des Forêts was divided into 26 cantons. Among those the canton of Ospern, with most borders identical to the present-day canton of Redange (except the present-day eastern border with Belgium, which was established in 1839 following the 3rd partition of Luxembourg).

On 12 October 1841, the capital of the canton was ordered to be transferred from Ospern to Redange.

=== Industrialisation ===
Towards the end of the 17th century, slate mines were excavated near present-day Haut-Martelange and Rombach, in the northwest of the canton.

The importance of this site grew significantly after investments were made by the Rother family from Frankfurt. The connection of Haut-Martelange to the Noerdange-Martelange railway line (Jhangeli) in 1890 provided the possibility for high-volume exports across the whole of Europe.

During this time, the slate mines of Haut-Martelange accounted for a significant amount of Luxembourg's exports and were a major provider of labour in the region. The underground mines grew to become among the most important producers of slate in Europe.

The extraction of slate stopped in 1986 after the death of Christiane Rother in 1985, the last descendant of the Rother family.

== Population ==
Historical population

Year	Pop.	±%
1821	10,345	—
1851	15,785	+52.6%
1900	14,243	−9.8%
1910	13,960	−2.0%
1922	12,947	−7.3%
1935	12,024	−7.1%

Year	Pop.	±%
1947	11,657	−3.1%
1960	10,500	−9.9%
1970	10,305	−1.9%
1981	10,268	−0.4%
1990	11,007	+7.2%
2000	13,569	+23.3%

Year	Pop.	±%
2005	14,504	+6.9%
2010	16,005	+10.3%
2015	17,401	+8.7%
2020	19,473	+11.9%
2021	19,866	+2.0%

Source data
