= Leudelange =

Leudelange Leideleng (Luxembourgish) Leudelingen (German)
- Commune
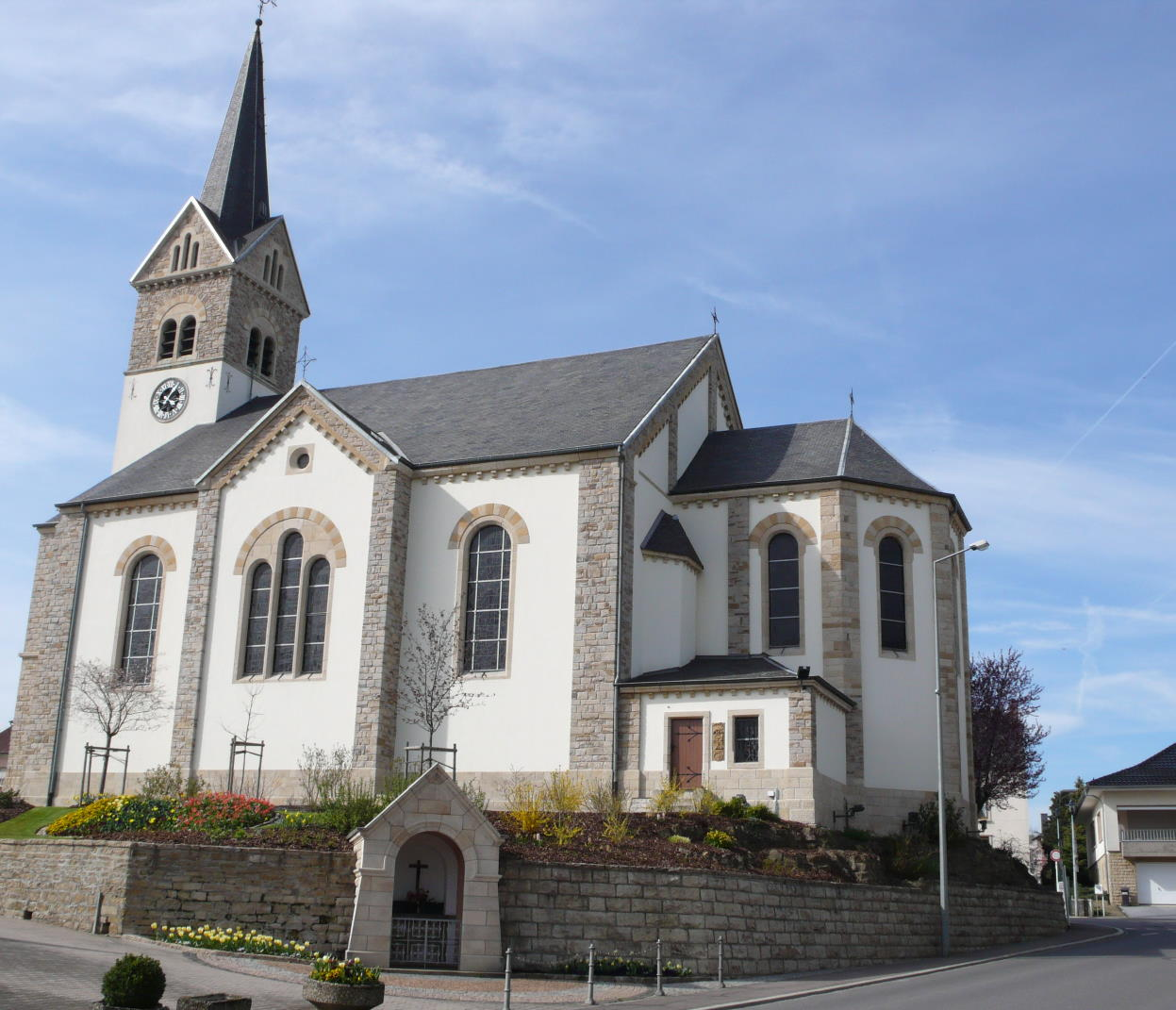
- The church of Leudelange

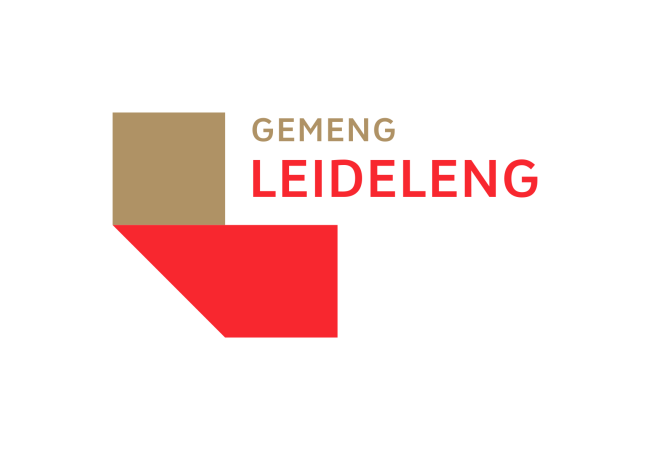
- Coat of arms Brandmark

- Map of Luxembourg with Leudelange highlighted in orange, and the canton in dark red
- Coordinates: 49.5667°N 6.0667°E
- Country: Luxembourg
- Canton: Esch-sur-Alzette

Government
  - Mayor: Lou Linster

Area
  - Total: 13.57 km^{2} (5.24 sq mi)
  - Rank: 84th of 100
- Highest elevation: 359 m (1,178 ft)
  - Rank: 77th of 100
- Lowest elevation: 276 m (906 ft)
  - Rank: 77th of 100

Population (2025)
  - Total: 2,788
  - Rank: 61st of 100
  - Density: 205.5/km^{2} (532.1/sq mi)
  - Rank: 43rd of 100
- Time zone: UTC+1 (CET)
  - Summer (DST): UTC+2 (CEST)
- LAU 2: LU0000207
- Website: leudelange.lu

Leudelange (French pronunciation: [lødlɑ̃ʒ]; Luxembourgish: Leideleng; German: Leudelingen) is a commune and town in south-western Luxembourg. It is situated in the canton of Esch-sur-Alzette.

As of September 2026, the town of Leudelange, which lies in the centre of the commune, had a population of 2,748.

Leudelange was formed on 1 July 1856, when it was detached from the commune of Reckange-sur-Mess. The law forming Leudelange was passed on the 3 March 1856.

== Population ==
Historical population

Year	Pop.	±%
1821	282	—
1851	583	+106.7%
1900	694	+19.0%
1910	692	−0.3%
1922	763	+10.3%
1935	690	−9.6%

Year	Pop.	±%
1947	714	+3.5%
1960	788	+10.4%
1970	1,077	+36.7%
1981	1,340	+24.4%
1990	1,479	+10.4%
2000	1,690	+14.3%

Year	Pop.	±%
2005	1,923	+13.8%
2010	2,108	+9.6%
2015	2,400	+13.9%
2020	2,702	+12.6%
2021	2,704	+0.1%

Source data

== Notable people ==
- Norbert Sinner (1907–1945); a Luxembourgish cyclist, competed at the 1928 Summer Olympics; executed for Nazi collaboration
- Gilles Müller (born 1983), a professional tennis player
