= Mertzig =

Mertzig Mäerzeg (Luxembourgish)
- Commune
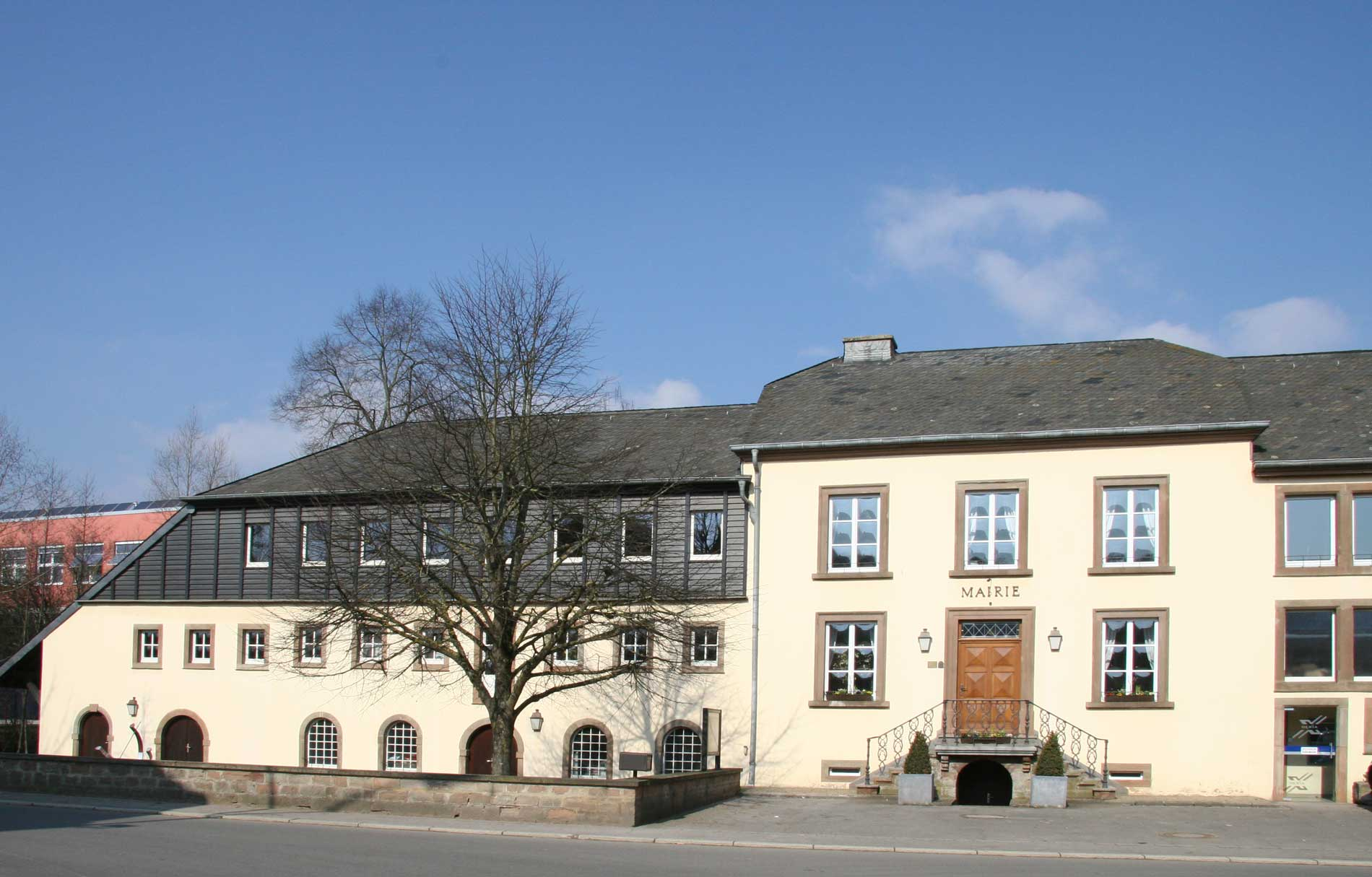
- Mertzig town hall

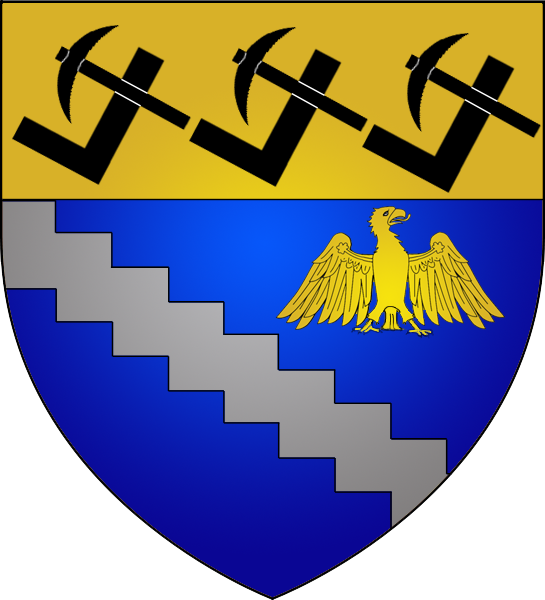
- Coat of arms

- Map of Luxembourg with Mertzig highlighted in orange, and the canton in dark red
- Coordinates: 49.83109°N 6.00366°E
- Country: Luxembourg
- Canton: Diekirch

Government
  - Mayor: Mike Poiré

Area
  - Total: 11.1 km^{2} (4.3 sq mi)
  - Rank: 92nd of 100
- Highest elevation: 409 m (1,342 ft)
  - Rank: 42nd of 100
- Lowest elevation: 302 m (991 ft)
  - Rank: 94th of 100

Population (2025)
  - Total: 2,415
  - Rank: 68th of 100
  - Density: 218/km^{2} (563/sq mi)
  - Rank: 39th of 100
- Time zone: UTC+1 (CET)
  - Summer (DST): UTC+2 (CEST)
- LAU 2: LU0000607
- Website: mertzig.lu

Mertzig (German pronunciation: [ˈmɛʁtsɪç]; Luxembourgish: Mäerzeg) is a commune and town in central Luxembourg. It is part of Diekirch Canton.

Mertzig was formed on 30 December 1874, when it was detached from the commune of Feulen. The law forming Mertzig was passed on 20 November 1874.

== Population ==
Historical population

Year	Pop.	±%
1821	576	—
1851	1,052	+82.6%
1900	826	−21.5%
1910	807	−2.3%
1922	817	+1.2%
1935	705	−13.7%

Year	Pop.	±%
1947	702	−0.4%
1960	746	+6.3%
1970	814	+9.1%
1981	920	+13.0%
1990	1,051	+14.2%
2000	1,410	+34.2%

Year	Pop.	±%
2005	1,546	+9.6%
2010	1,705	+10.3%
2015	1,998	+17.2%
2020	2,293	+14.8%
2021	2,285	−0.3%

Source data
