= Forêts =

French department (1795–1814)

Department of Forêts Département des Forêts (French)
- 1795–1814

- Arrondissements and cantons of Forêts
- Status: Department of: French First Republic; French First Empire
- Chef-lieu: Luxembourg; 49°36′38″N 6°7′58″E
- Official languages: French
- Common languages: Luxembourgish, German
- Religion: Catholic
- History
  - Creation: 1 October 1795
  - Treaty of Paris, disestablished: 30 May 1814

Area
  - Total: 6,910 km^{2} (2,670 sq mi)

Population
  - 1812: 246,333
- Currency: French franc
Preceded by	Succeeded by
Duchy of Luxembourg; Republic of Bouillon	Grand Duchy of Luxembourg; Grand Duchy of the Lower Rhine
- Today part of: Belgium; Germany; Luxembourg

Forêts (French: [fɔ.ʁɛ]) was a department of the French First Republic, and later the First French Empire, in present-day Belgium, Luxembourg, and Germany. Its name, meaning 'forests', comes from the Ardennes forests. It was formed on 24 October 1795, after the Austrian Netherlands had been annexed by France on 1 October. Before annexation, the territory was part of the Duchy of Luxembourg and small parts of the Duchy of Bouillon. Its capital was Luxembourg City.

14,176 men from the former Duchy of Luxembourg were conscripted into the French Revolutionary Army and the Grande Armée in these years, of whom 9,809 died on the battlefields of Europe.

After Napoleon was defeated in 1814, most of Forêts became part of the Grand Duchy of Luxembourg (in a personal union with the United Kingdom of the Netherlands); the part on the east side of the rivers Our and Sauer became part of the Prussian Grand Duchy of the Lower Rhine, which was succeeded by the Rhine Province in 1822. Luxembourg was partitioned following the Belgian Revolution, with the western part becoming the Belgian Province of Luxembourg. Prussia established the German Empire in 1871, the precursor to modern Germany. Today the territory is divided between the Grand Duchy of Luxembourg, the Belgian Province of Luxembourg, and the German state of Rhineland-Palatinate.

The department was subdivided into the following arrondissements and cantons (situation in 1812):

- Luxembourg: cantons Luxembourg (2 cantons), Arlon, Bettembourg, Betzdorf, Grevenmacher, Mersch, Messancy, and Remich (Arlon and Messancy now in Belgium, others in Luxembourg).
- Bitburg: cantons Bitburg, Arzfeld, Dudeldorf, Echternach, and Neuerburg (Echternach now in Luxembourg, others in Germany).
- Diekirch: cantons Diekirch, Clervaux, Ospern, Vianden, and Wiltz (now in Luxembourg).
- Neufchâteau: cantons Neufchâteau, Bastogne, Étalle, Fauvillers, Florenville, Houffalize, Paliseul, Sibret and Virton (all now in Belgium).

Its population in 1812 was 246,333, and its area was 691,035 hectares.

== Background ==
The city and fortress of Luxembourg capitulated to French Revolutionary troops on 7 June 1795 after a 6-month siege. On 1 October, the National Convention decreed the French annexation of the Austrian Netherlands.

== Regime ==
Luxembourg's administrative, institutional, economic, social, and political framework was swept away without restraint. Rather than a simple transfer of sovereignty, such as Luxembourg had experienced many over the previous decades, this period was to put Luxembourg and surrounding areas on the path to a new kind of society.

The privileges of the masters and guilds of artisans were abolished in November 1795. Under the Austrian Netherlands, civil registrations (births, deaths, marriages) were left to the parishes, and linked to sacraments administered by the Church. From June 1796, this changed: registrations were performed by a civil registrar. In Luxembourg's deeply Catholic, traditional society, in which religion was omnipresent and resistant to change, the secularisation of marriage and the introduction of divorce were fault lines that caused great consternation.

The institutions and administrative machinery introduced by the French in this period provided the basis of today's government institutions in Luxembourg: districts (arrondissements), cantons and communes were introduced under the French, and continue to exist.

The Code civil or Code Napoléon, introduced by the French in 1804, had a profound impact on Luxembourgish society, and is still in force 200 years later. Luxembourgish law remains close to French law: Luxembourgish law students study in France or in Belgium. Arguments before the courts, and the announcement of verdicts, are conducted in French. Laws and regulations were published in French and German from 1816, but since 1945, only in French.

French rule in Luxembourg provoked widespread discontent, for several reasons: religious persecutions, the suppression of the religious orders in the city of Luxembourg, military requisitions, taxation, and the introduction of obligatory military service from 1798. This discontent culminated in the Peasants' War that same year, a revolt in the northern part of the department that was limited to the peasantry. Among other classes of society, however, the benefits of the Napoleonic reforms met with a level of appreciation.

At the same time, a fundamental characteristic of the French Revolutionary government, administrative centralisation, collided with Luxembourgish traditions: each department received a central commissioner. The department of Forêts saw four commissioners over the years, all of them from France proper.

=== Economy ===
In the city of Luxembourg, due to the abolition of the corporations, a commercial and artisanal revolution took place, allowing a middle class to emerge, whose members could for the first time participate in political life under the French regime.

Another development linked to the disappearance of the corporations occurred in the countryside: small artisanal business sprang up, often with only one employee. Employer and worker would enjoy a certain proximity, eating at the same table. In 1803, the livret d'ouvrier (labourer's booklet) was introduced. This was to list what work labourers did for whom, and a reference from their last employer every time they changed workplace. If travelling without their booklet, they could be reported as a vagabond, and punished accordingly. The Code civil's Article 1781 established the "legal superiority of the employer," while the Code pénal in 1810 forbade workers from forming trade unions. These provisions were evidence of a great mistrust of the world of the workers, who were seen as a danger to society. The overarching objective of the livret d'ouvrier was to keep under surveillance a social class judged seen as dangerous, and to prevent poaching of labourers amongst competing enterprises, in this period of manpower shortages. Finally, it represented an "effective means of domination by the employers," and "a veritable internal passport."

== References and further reading ==
- Clesse, René (1995). "De Ruckels Pier an d'Knätzelkätt: Die Luxemburger und der Geist der Französischen Revolution" (PDF). Ons Stad (in German) (49): 22–23.
- Hirsch, Mario (1995). "L'héritage de la Révolution française" (PDF). Ons Stad (in French) (49): 2–3.
- Kreins, Jean-Marie (2003). Histoire du Luxembourg (in French) (3rd ed.). Paris: Presses Universitaires de France. ISBN 978-2-13-053852-3.
- Margue, Paul (2011). "Institutions nouvelles créées par la Révolution française et leur survie dans l'histoire du Grand-Duché". Du Luxembourg à l'Europe. Hommages à Gilbert Trausch à l'occasion de son 80e anniversaire (in French). Luxembourg: Editions Saint-Paul. ISBN 978-2-87963-836-2.
