= Vichten =

Vichten Viichten
- Commune
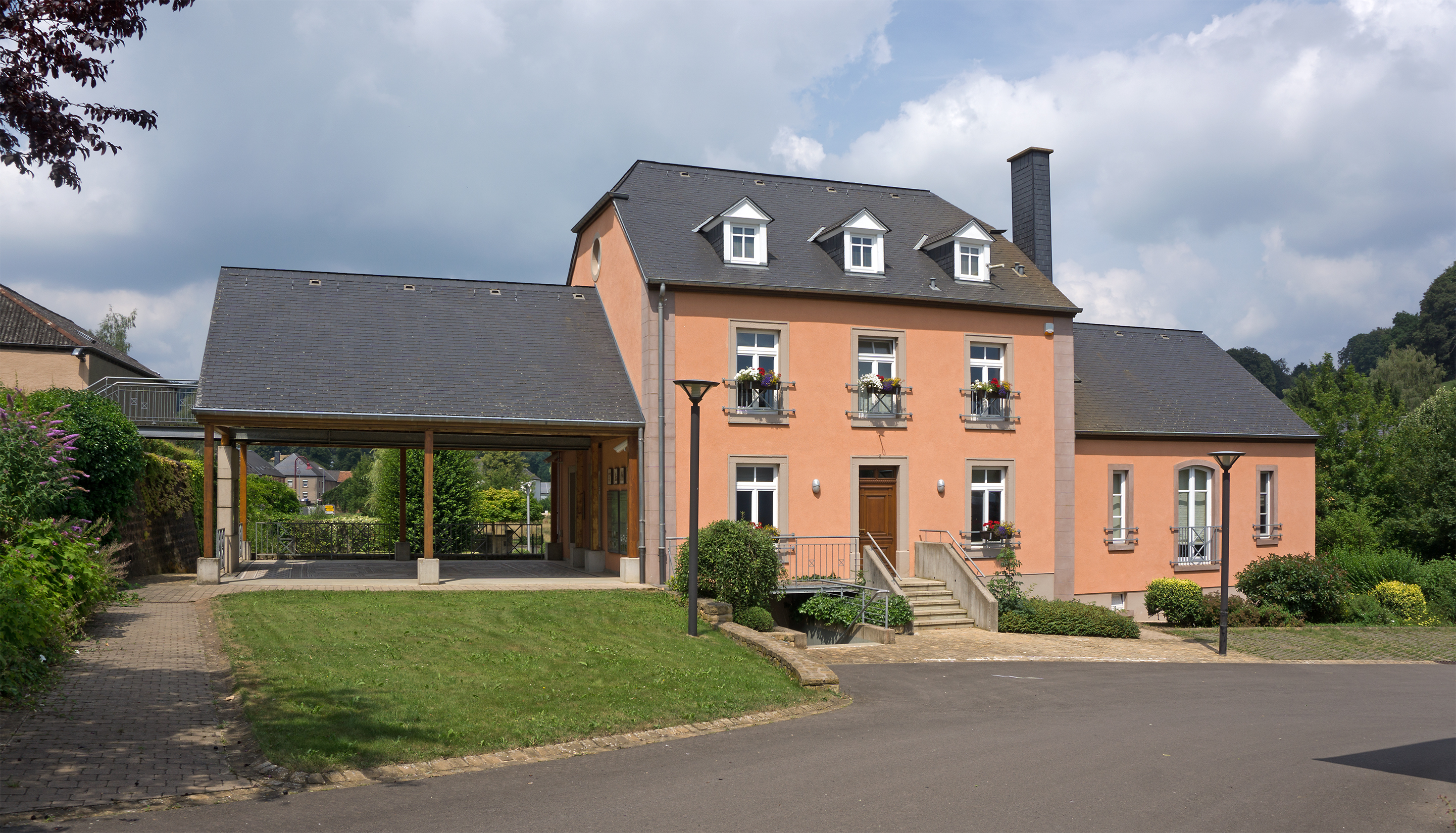
- Town hall

- Coat of arms

- Map of Luxembourg with Vichten highlighted in orange, and the canton in dark red
- Coordinates: 49.8°N 6°E
- Country: Luxembourg
- Canton: Redange

Government
  - Mayor: Paul Maréchal

Area
  - Total: 12.26 km^{2} (4.73 sq mi)
  - Rank: 89th of 100
- Highest elevation: 384 m (1,260 ft)
  - Rank: 65th of 100
- Lowest elevation: 264 m (866 ft)
  - Rank: 67th of 100

Population (2026)
  - Total: 1,432
  - Rank: 95th of 100
  - Density: 116.8/km^{2} (302.5/sq mi)
  - Rank: 63rd of 100
- Time zone: UTC+1 (CET)
  - Summer (DST): UTC+2 (CEST)
- LAU 2: LU0000709
- Website: vichten.lu

Vichten (German pronunciation: [ˈfɪçtn̩]; Luxembourgish: Viichten [ˈfiːɕtən]) is a commune and small town in central Luxembourg, in the canton of Redange.

As of September 2026, the town of Vichten, which lies in the west of the commune, has a population of 1,247. The commune also includes the town of Michelbouch.

The town is notable as the site of a large Roman villa containing a large and well-preserved mosaic. The mosaic itself is on display at the National Museum of History and Art in Luxembourg City. A replica can be seen in Vichten itself.

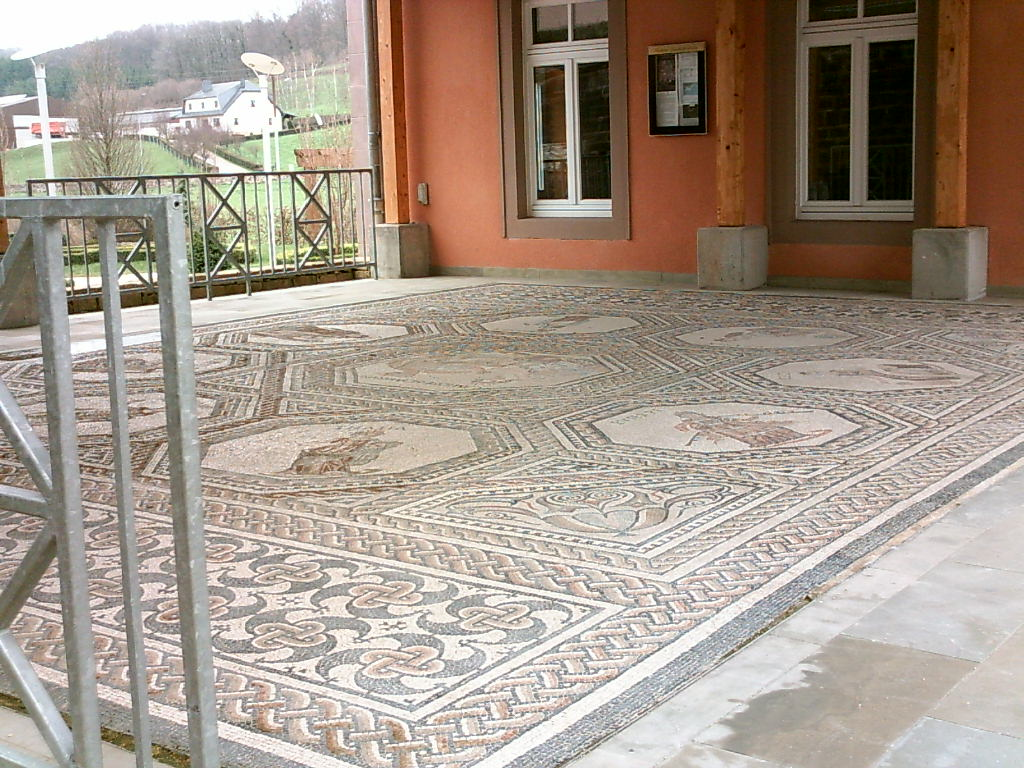
Replica of the Roman mosaic in Vichten

== Population ==
Historical population

Year	Pop.	±%
1821	444	—
1851	769	+73.2%
1900	685	−10.9%
1910	708	+3.4%
1922	669	−5.5%
1935	512	−23.5%

Year	Pop.	±%
1947	493	−3.7%
1960	488	−1.0%
1970	512	+4.9%
1981	574	+12.1%
1990	636	+10.8%
2000	802	+26.1%

Year	Pop.	±%
2005	867	+8.1%
2010	1,032	+19.0%
2015	1,088	+5.4%
2020	1,313	+20.7%
2021	1,360	+3.6%

Source data
