= Bissen =

Bissen Biissen
- Commune
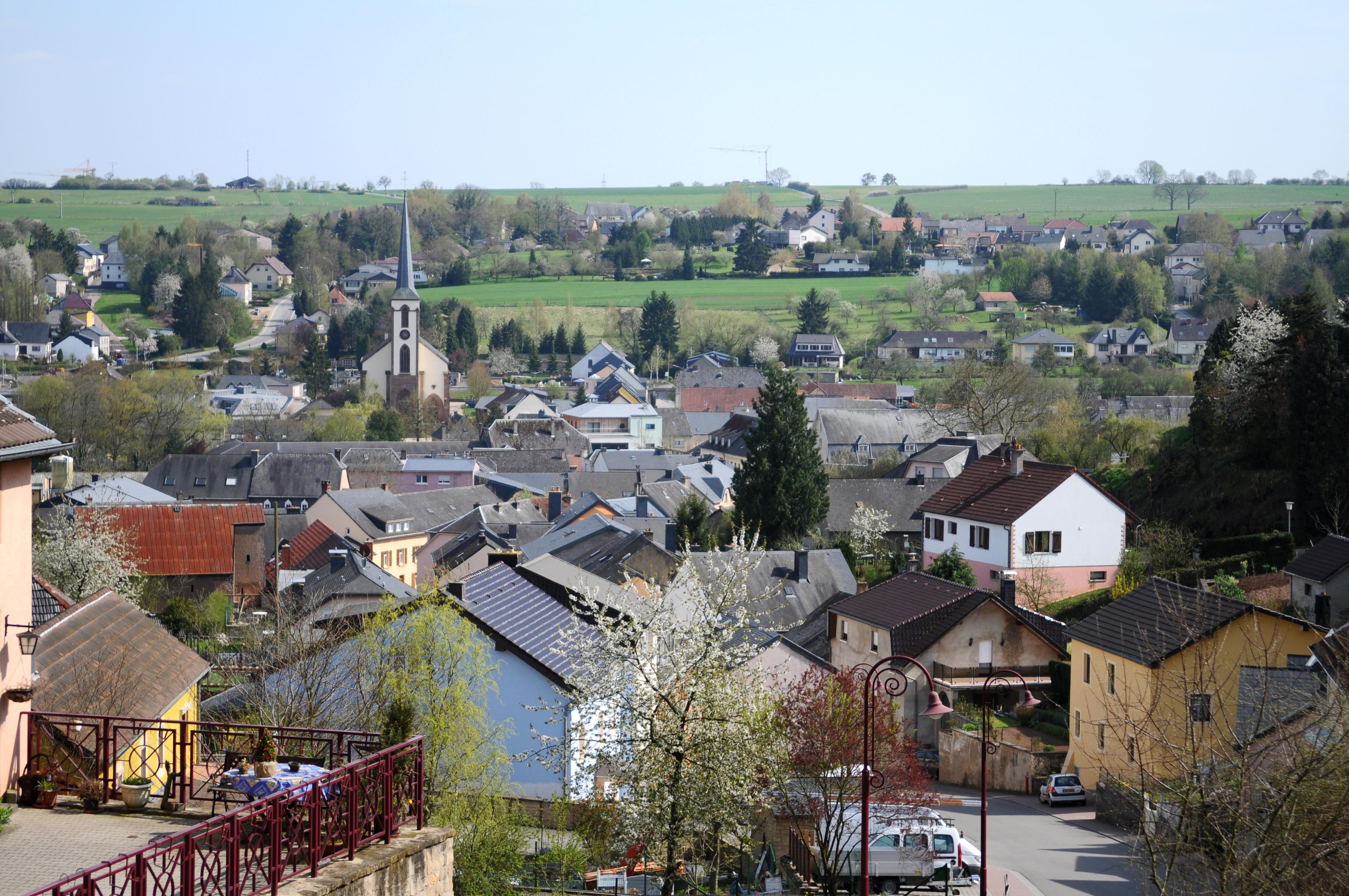
- Bissen seen from the Wobierg

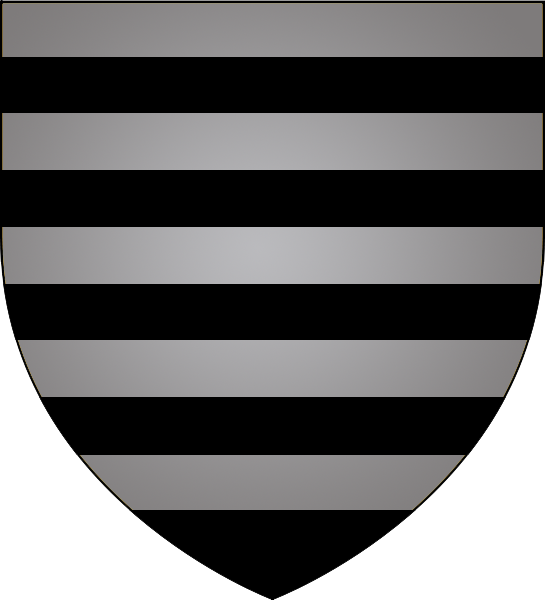
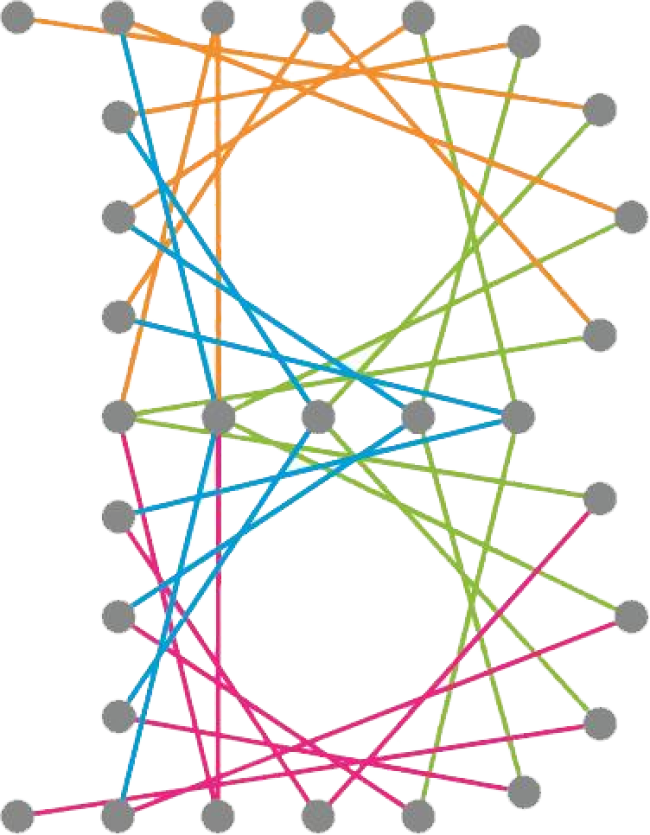
- Coat of arms Brandmark

- Map of Luxembourg with Bissen highlighted in orange, and the canton in dark red
- Coordinates: 49.7833°N 6.0667°E
- Country: Luxembourg
- Canton: Mersch

Government
  - Mayor: David Viaggi (Your People)

Area
  - Total: 20.75 km^{2} (8.01 sq mi)
  - Rank: 53rd of 100
- Highest elevation: 358 m (1,175 ft)
  - Rank: 79th of 100
- Lowest elevation: 214 m (702 ft)
  - Rank: 32nd of 100

Population (2026)
  - Total: 3,591
  - Rank: 50th of 100
  - Density: 173.1/km^{2} (448.2/sq mi)
  - Rank: 48th of 100
- Time zone: UTC+1 (CET)
  - Summer (DST): UTC+2 (CEST)
- LAU 2: LU0000402
- Website: bissen.lu

Bissen (German pronunciation: [ˈbɪsn̩]; Luxembourgish: Biissen [ˈbiːsən]) is a commune and town in central Luxembourg, in the canton of Mersch. It is situated on the river Attert.

As of September 2026, the town of Bissen, which lies in the east of the commune, has a population of 3,548. Bissen is home to a steel factory, operated by ArcelorMittal, the world's second-largest steel manufacturer. The town is also home to FC Atert Bissen, who won the National Divison in 2026.

== Population ==
Historical population

Year	Pop.	±%
1821	782	—
1851	1,315	+68.2%
1900	1,205	−8.4%
1910	1,154	−4.2%
1922	1,204	+4.3%
1935	1,144	−5.0%

Year	Pop.	±%
1947	1,096	−4.2%
1960	1,085	−1.0%
1970	1,323	+21.9%
1981	1,671	+26.3%
1990	1,754	+5.0%
2000	2,478	+41.3%

Year	Pop.	±%
2005	2,462	−0.6%
2010	2,750	+11.7%
2015	2,846	+3.5%
2020	3,216	+13.0%
2021	3,269	+1.6%

Source data
