= Saeul =

Saeul Sëll
- Commune
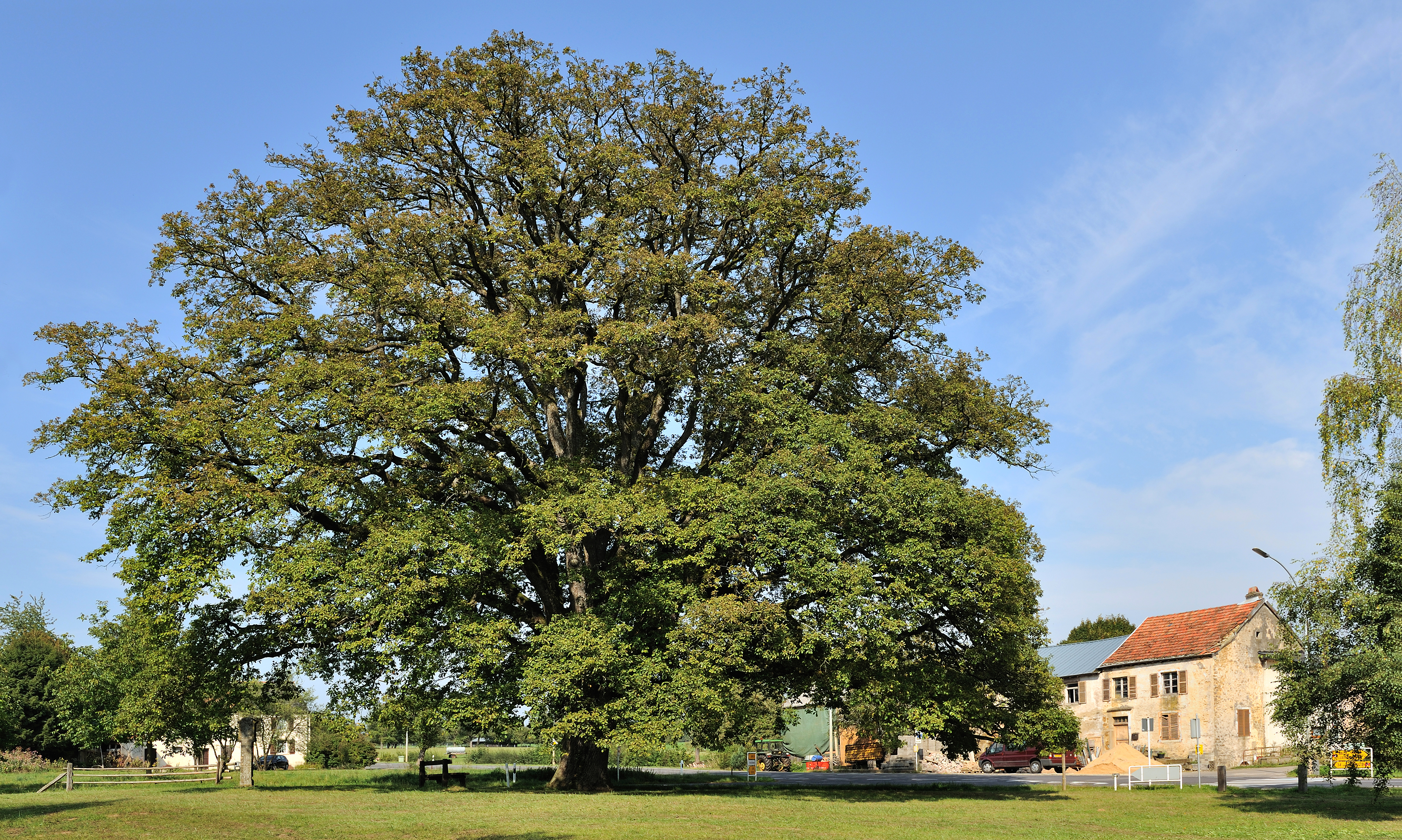
- The remarkable oak

- Coat of arms

- Map of Luxembourg with Saeul highlighted in orange, and the canton in dark red
- Coordinates: 49°43′37″N 5°59′08″E
- Country: Luxembourg
- Canton: Redange

Government
  - Mayor: Gérard Zoller

Area
  - Total: 14.86 km^{2} (5.74 sq mi)
  - Rank: 78th of 100
- Highest elevation: 382 m (1,253 ft)
  - Rank: 68th of 100
- Lowest elevation: 254 m (833 ft)
  - Rank: 57th of 100

Population (2026)
  - Total: 1,073
  - Rank: 100th of 100
  - Density: 72.21/km^{2} (187.0/sq mi)
  - Rank: 83rd of 100
- Time zone: UTC+1 (CET)
  - Summer (DST): UTC+2 (CEST)
- LAU 2: LU0000707
- Website: saeul.lu

Saeul (Luxembourgish: Sëll [ˈzəl]) is a commune and small town in western Luxembourg, in the canton of Redange. With a population of 1,025 as of 2025, it is the least populous commune in Luxembourg.

As of September 2026, the town of Saeul itself, which lies in the south-east of the commune, has a population of 532. In November 2024, it became the last municipality in Luxembourg to reach 1,000 residents.

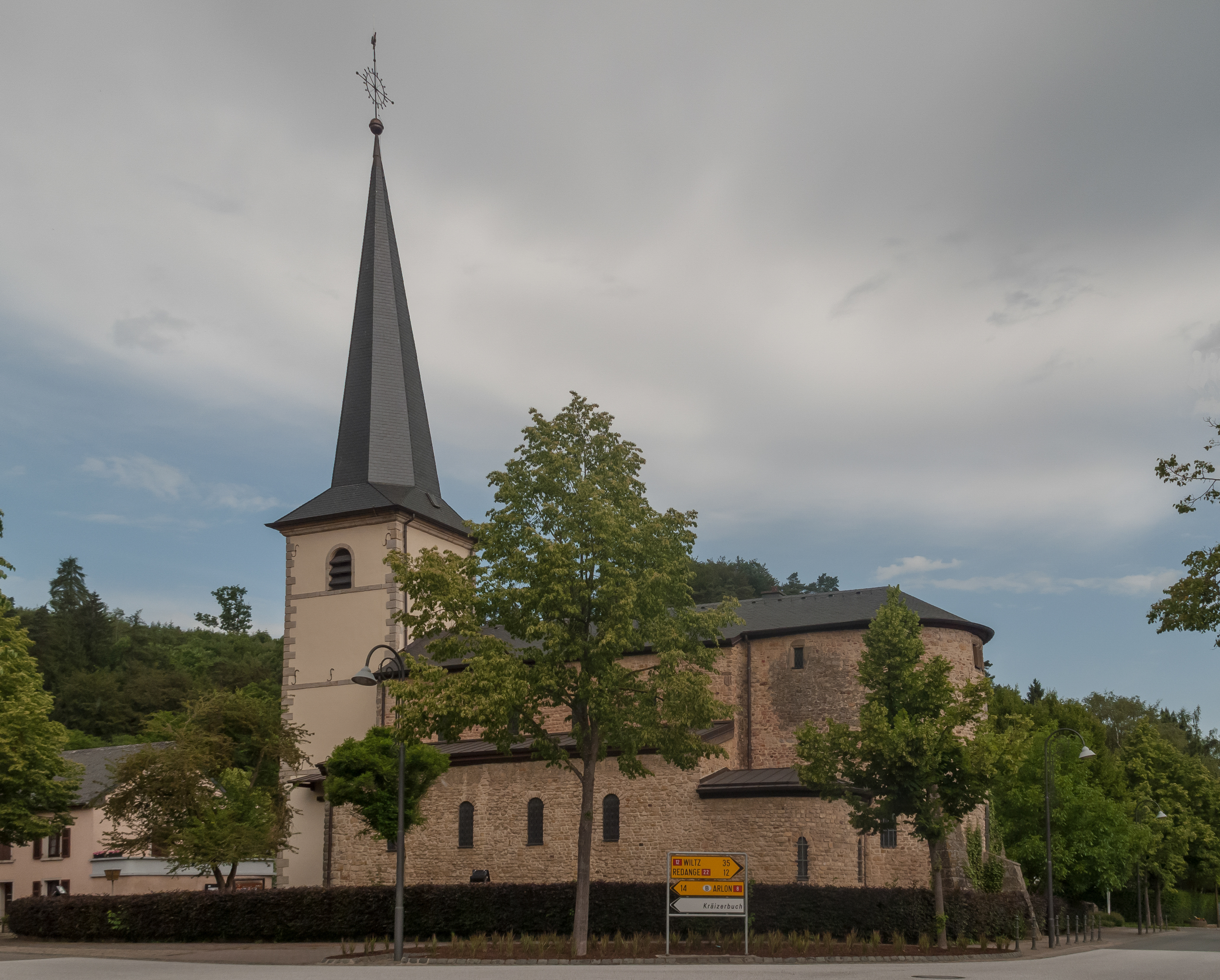
Saeul, church: l'église de l'Assomption de la Bienheureuse-Vierge-Marie

== Population ==
Historical population

| Year | Pop. | ±% |
|---|---|---|
| 1821 | 539 | — |
| 1851 | 706 | +31.0% |
| 1900 | 604 | −14.4% |
| 1910 | 592 | −2.0% |
| 1922 | 565 | −4.6% |
| 1935 | 511 | −9.6% |

| Year | Pop. | ±% |
|---|---|---|
| 1947 | 497 | −2.7% |
| 1960 | 420 | −15.5% |
| 1970 | 426 | +1.4% |
| 1981 | 426 | +0.0% |
| 1990 | 475 | +11.5% |
| 2000 | 463 | −2.5% |

| Year | Pop. | ±% |
|---|---|---|
| 2005 | 538 | +16.2% |
| 2010 | 697 | +29.6% |
| 2015 | 710 | +1.9% |
| 2020 | 857 | +20.7% |
| 2021 | 874 | +2.0% |

Source data
