= Remich =

Remich Réimech
- Commune
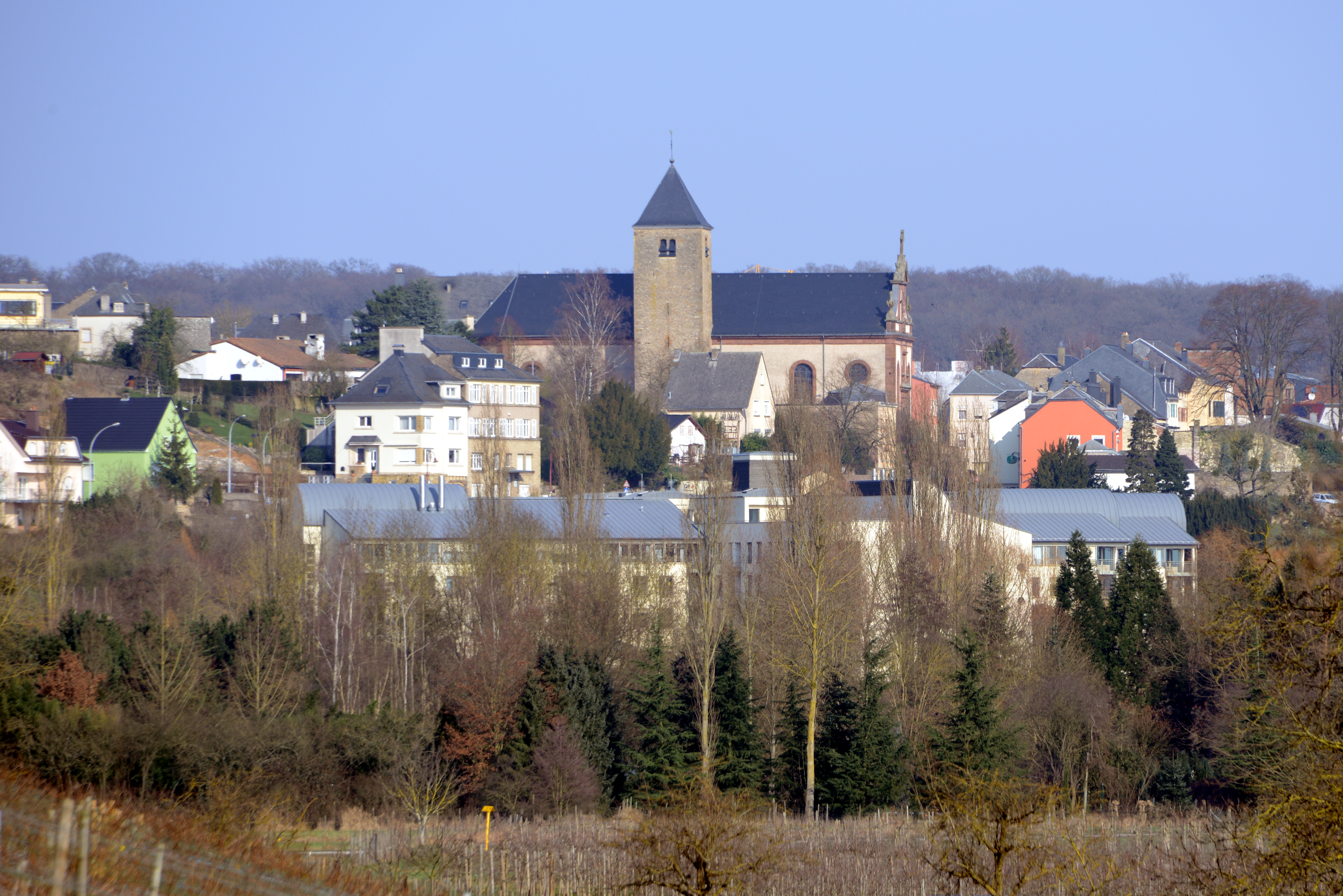

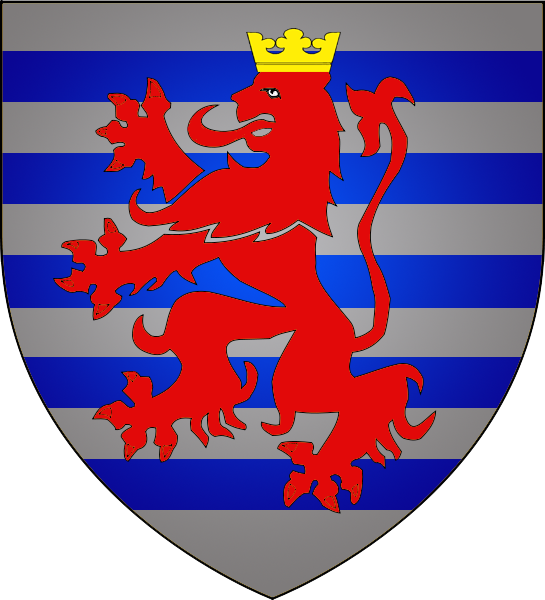
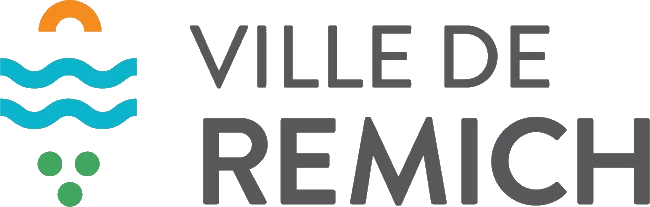
- Coat of arms Brandmark

- Map of Luxembourg with Remich highlighted in orange, and the canton in dark red
- Coordinates: 49.5444°N 6.3667°E
- Country: Luxembourg
- Canton: Remich

Government
  - Mayor: Jacques Sitz (DP)

Area
  - Total: 5.29 km^{2} (2.04 sq mi)
  - Rank: 102nd of 100
- Highest elevation: 253 m (830 ft)
  - Rank: 102nd of 100
- Lowest elevation: 142 m (466 ft)
  - Rank: 7th of 100

Population (2025)
  - Total: 4,149
  - Rank: 46th of 100
  - Density: 784/km^{2} (2,030/sq mi)
  - Rank: 11th of 100
- Time zone: UTC+1 (CET)
  - Summer (DST): UTC+2 (CEST)
- LAU 2: LU0001205
- Website: remich.lu

Remich (German pronunciation: [ˈʁeːmɪç]; Luxembourgish: Réimech [ˈʀɜɪ̯məɕ]) is a commune with city status in south-eastern Luxembourg with a population of 4,101 inhabitants as of 2024. It is situated in the canton of the same name. Remich lies on the left bank of the river Moselle, which forms part of the border between Luxembourg and Germany. The commune is the smallest in Luxembourg by surface area.

The Moselle valley is dominated by wine-making and many small wine-making towns, of which Remich is one of the most picturesque and frequented by tourists.

== History ==
In the 5th century, after the withdrawal of Roman troops, the Roman settlement of "Remacum" gradually turned into "Remich".

In the 8th century the King of the Franks, Pepin the Short ceded his crown estate "Hof Remich" to the Benedictine St. Maximin's Abbey in Trier and to Prüm Abbey. In 882, the Normans destroyed the settlement. Fragments of the medieval town fortifications from 952, such as the St. Nicolas gate, are still visible today. Originally the town gate, it is dedicated to the patron saint of fishermen and sailors, and is registered as a national monument today, as is the decanal church, whose rectangular tower is a former defensive tower from the 12th century. In 1687 the town's fortifications were demolished by the army of Louis XIV.

There are still various coats of arms and guild symbols on some of the houses today.

Remich was visited by William II, Grand-Duke of Luxembourg and King of the Netherlands, on 16 July 1844. It received another royal visit on 28 May 1855 by his son, William III, who was accompanied by his brother, Prince Henry, the Governor of Luxembourg.

In 1866 the first bridge was built over the Moselle. After its destruction in World War II it was replaced first with a wooden construction, then in 1958 with the bridge that still stands today. Since its canalisation in 1964, it has been possible for boats to sail on the Moselle all year round.

== Climate ==
Remich has an oceanic climate (Köppen Cfb). The annual average temperature is 10.7 °C (51.3 °F), the hottest month in July is 19.6 °C (67.3 °F), and the coldest month is 2.4 °C (36.3 °F) in January. The annual precipitation is 711.8 millimetres (28.02 in), of which December is the wettest with 78.9 millimetres (3.11 in), while April is the driest with only 43.1 millimetres (1.70 in). The extreme temperature throughout the year ranged from −15.2 °C (4.6 °F) on January 1, 1997 to 40.6 °C (105.1 °F) on July 25, 2019.

Climate data for Remich, 1991-2020 normals
| Month | Jan | Feb | Mar | Apr | May | Jun | Jul | Aug | Sep | Oct | Nov | Dec | Year |
|---|---|---|---|---|---|---|---|---|---|---|---|---|---|
| Record high °C (°F) | 14.5 (58.1) | 23.9 (75.0) | 23.4 (74.1) | 29.1 (84.4) | 32.7 (90.9) | 36.1 (97.0) | 40.6 (105.1) | 40.5 (104.9) | 34.2 (93.6) | 28.7 (83.7) | 21.5 (70.7) | 16.0 (60.8) | 40.6 (105.1) |
| Mean daily maximum °C (°F) | 5.2 (41.4) | 6.9 (44.4) | 11.2 (52.2) | 15.9 (60.6) | 20.0 (68.0) | 23.3 (73.9) | 25.4 (77.7) | 24.9 (76.8) | 20.4 (68.7) | 15.1 (59.2) | 9.0 (48.2) | 5.7 (42.3) | 15.3 (59.5) |
| Daily mean °C (°F) | 2.4 (36.3) | 3.1 (37.6) | 6.6 (43.9) | 10.4 (50.7) | 14.4 (57.9) | 17.6 (63.7) | 19.6 (67.3) | 18.9 (66.0) | 14.8 (58.6) | 10.6 (51.1) | 6.2 (43.2) | 3.3 (37.9) | 10.7 (51.3) |
| Mean daily minimum °C (°F) | −0.2 (31.6) | 0.0 (32.0) | 2.3 (36.1) | 4.9 (40.8) | 8.7 (47.7) | 11.8 (53.2) | 13.7 (56.7) | 13.3 (55.9) | 9.9 (49.8) | 6.9 (44.4) | 3.4 (38.1) | 0.9 (33.6) | 6.3 (43.3) |
| Record low °C (°F) | −15.2 (4.6) | −14.7 (5.5) | −15.2 (4.6) | −5.3 (22.5) | −2.0 (28.4) | 0.5 (32.9) | 6.0 (42.8) | 4.8 (40.6) | 0.7 (33.3) | −5.9 (21.4) | −10.4 (13.3) | −14.4 (6.1) | −15.2 (4.6) |
| Average precipitation mm (inches) | 53.2 (2.09) | 52.2 (2.06) | 48.7 (1.92) | 43.1 (1.70) | 58.7 (2.31) | 65.8 (2.59) | 62.5 (2.46) | 60.9 (2.40) | 57.2 (2.25) | 68.2 (2.69) | 62.5 (2.46) | 78.9 (3.11) | 711.8 (28.02) |
| Average precipitation days (≥ 1.0 mm) | 11.0 | 9.9 | 9.7 | 8.3 | 9.2 | 9.0 | 9.2 | 9.0 | 8.0 | 10.0 | 11.6 | 12.5 | 117.5 |
| Mean monthly sunshine hours | 43.9 | 65.8 | 118.1 | 162.2 | 184.2 | 193.4 | 206.6 | 185.9 | 138.7 | 90.3 | 42.4 | 34.3 | 1,465.7 |
Source: NOAA

== Population ==
Historical population

| Year | Pop. | ±% |
|---|---|---|
| 1821 | 1,742 | — |
| 1851 | 2,437 | +39.9% |
| 1900 | 1,974 | −19.0% |
| 1910 | 1,858 | −5.9% |
| 1922 | 1,747 | −6.0% |
| 1935 | 1,770 | +1.3% |

| Year | Pop. | ±% |
|---|---|---|
| 1947 | 1,716 | −3.1% |
| 1960 | 1,801 | +5.0% |
| 1970 | 2,138 | +18.7% |
| 1981 | 2,376 | +11.1% |
| 1990 | 2,496 | +5.1% |
| 2000 | 2,917 | +16.9% |

| Year | Pop. | ±% |
|---|---|---|
| 2005 | 2,978 | +2.1% |
| 2010 | 3,217 | +8.0% |
| 2015 | 3,476 | +8.1% |
| 2020 | 3,732 | +7.4% |
| 2021 | 3,787 | +1.5% |

Source data

== Remich Fuesend Karneval ==
Remich annually holds a three-day-long celebration for Carnival (called Fuesend Karneval in Luxembourgish). Remich is notable for two special events in addition to its Fuesend Karneval parades. The first of these is the Stréimännchen, which is the burning of a male effigy from the Remich bridge that crosses the Moselle separating the Grand Duchy from Germany. The Stréimännchen symbolizes the burning away of winter. The other special event at the Remich Fuesend celebrations is the Buergbrennen or bonfire that closes the celebration.

== Communal council ==
=== Current composition ===
The communal council is composed as detailed below. The results are those of the most recent communal elections on 11 June 2023.

| Party | Popular vote | Seats | Change |
|---|---|---|---|
| Democratic Party (DP) | 34.58% | 4 | 0 |
| Christian Social People's Party (CSV) | 22.36% | 3 | 0 |
| The Greens | 17.08% | 2 | 0 |
| Pirate Party of Luxembourg (PPLU) | 14.65% | 1 | 0 |
| Luxembourg Socialist Worker's Party (LSAP) | 11.32% | 1 | 0 |
| Total | | 11 | |

NB: The "Change" column refers to a party's number of seats gained/lost since the 2017 communal elections.

=== 2017 ===
Elections were held on 8 October 2017.

| Party | Popular vote | Seats | Change |
|---|---|---|---|
| Democratic Party (DP) | 29% | 4 | ▲2 |
| Christian Social People's Party (CSV) | 26.4% | 3 | ▼1 |
| The Greens | 20.42% | 2 | ▼2 |
| Pirate Party of Luxembourg (PPLU) | 14% | 1 | ▲1 |
| Luxembourg Socialist Worker's Party (LSAP) | 10.18% | 1 | 0 |
| Total | | 11 | |

NB: The "Change" column refers to a party's number of seats gained/lost since the 2011 communal elections.

=== 2011 ===
Elections of 9 October 2011
| Party | Popular vote | Seats |
|---|---|---|
| Christian Social People's Party (CSV) | 33.81% | 4 |
| The Greens | 33.58% | 4 |
| Democratic Party (DP) | 19.51% | 2 |
| Luxembourg Socialist Worker's Party (LSAP) | 13.09% | 1 |
| Total | | 11 |

== List of mayors ==
- Jacques Sitz (2017–)
- Henri Kox (2009–2017)
- Jeannot Belling (1997–2009)
- Fernand Kons (1970–1993)
- Jean-Auguste Neyen (1888–1890)
- Joseph-Chrétien Gretsch (ca. 1870)
- Willibrorde Macher (ca. 1849–1856)

== Notable people ==
- Pierre-Ernest Dams (1794–1855), a Luxembourgish politician, judge, and journalist.
- Mary Alfred Moes (1828–1899), American Roman Catholic nun, born in Remich.
- Léandre Lacroix (1859–1935), a Luxembourgish politician and jurist; Mayor of Luxembourg City, 1914/1918.

== Twin towns ==
Remich is twinned with:

- Bessan, France
