= Canton of Esch-sur-Alzette =

Canton of Esch-sur-Alzette Kanton Esch-Uelzecht (Luxembourgish) Canton d'Esch-sur-Alzette (French) Kanton Esch an der Alzette (German)
- Canton
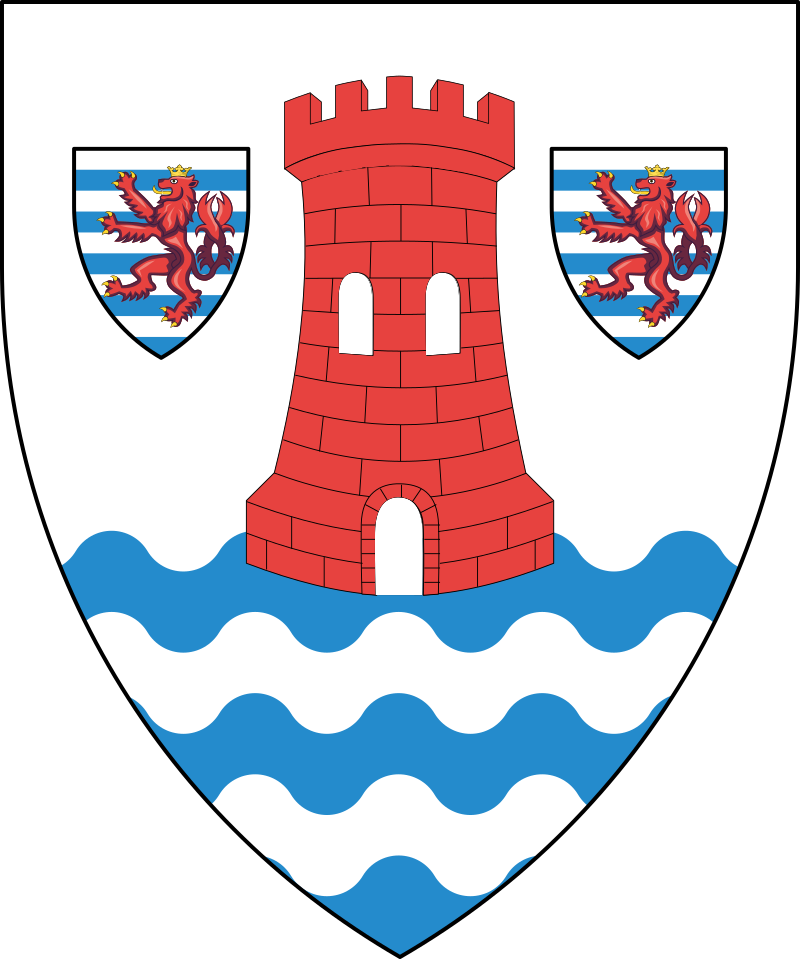
- Coat of arms

- Coordinates: 49°30′N 6°0′E
- Country: Luxembourg
- Legislative constituency: Sud
- LAU 1: LU00002
- Communes (cities in bold): Bettembourg; Differdange; Dudelange; Esch-sur-Alzette; Frisange; Kayl; Leudelange; Mondercange; Pétange; Reckange-sur-Mess; Roeser; Rumelange; Sanem; Schifflange

Area
  - Total: 242.8 km^{2} (93.7 sq mi)
  - Rank: 4th of 12
- Highest elevation (7th of 12): 435 m (1,427 ft)
- Lowest elevation (7th of 12): 224 m (735 ft)

Population (2026)
  - Total: 197,314
  - Rank: 2nd of 12
  - Density: 812.7/km^{2} (2,105/sq mi)
  - Rank: 2nd of 12
- ISO 3166 code: LU-ES

Esch-sur-Alzette (Luxembourgish: Esch-Uelzecht) is a canton in southwestern Luxembourg. It is both the second most populous and second most densely populated canton after the canton of Luxembourg. It borders Belgium & France.

== History ==
The canton was created on 31 August 1795, under the name of the canton of Soleuvre. This term was of short duration since, already on 22 October 1796, a new decree renamed it the canton of Bascharage. Bascharage canton was smaller than the current canton of Esch since Leudelange, Pontpierre, Bettembourg and Dudelange belonged to the canton of Hesperange, created to the south of the capital. Bascharage canton, on the other hand, included Marner, which is now in Capellen canton. Subsequently, there was a new change in the cantonal borders after a consular decree of 6 March 1802. The number of cantons in the Forêts department was reduced from 37 to 27 and, in the place of Bascharage canton, a canton of Bettembourg was created. However, this did not have the same borders as its predecessor, as it lost its western part, which went to the neighbouring canton of Messancy. The boundary between the cantons of Bettembourg and Messancy passes between Differdange (in the canton of Messancy), and Belvaux (in the canton of Bettembourg). Twelve years later came the end of Napoleon's Empire, the end of the Forêts department, and Luxembourg's de facto incorporation into the Kingdom of the Netherlands. The Dutch administration maintained the French administrative divisions, except for renaming arrondissements to districts.

After the Belgian Revolution of 1830, this system ended and for nine years, the administration of the Grand-Duchy — before its third partition — was carried out by Belgium, except for the city and federal fortress of Luxembourg, with its Prussian garrison. Under the French and Dutch administration, there had been a district of Luxembourg, whose commissioner resided in Luxembourg City. In order to administer this district, apart from Luxembourg City itself, the seat of the commissioner, an agent of the Belgian government, had been transferred to Bettembourg. This village of 740 habitants was now the administrative centre of the district. The notary Philippe Hanno, a Luxembourg native, was named district commissioner with residence in Bettembourg. In the night of 15 February 1834, the Prussian general du Moulin, commandant of the Fortress of Luxembourg, had Hanno captured in Bettembourg and imprisoned in Luxembourg. It required the intervention of France and the United Kingdom before Hanno was released.

The Treaty of London of 1839 divided Luxembourg, and in doing so, also partitioned the border cantons, from Troisvierges to Pétange.

The neighbour of the canton of Esch was that of Messancy, whose territory mostly passed to Belgium. The rest, that is the communes of Pétange and Differdange, was added to the canton of Bettembourg. At the same time, Bettembourg canton lost the commune of Dippach to the canton of Capellen, and the commune of Weiler-la-Tour to Luxembourg canton. With 13,116 inhabitants, the canton of Bettembourg was second to that of Luxembourg, with 27,891 inhabitants. Bettembourg was an agricultural canton. Minette ore was still unknown. Alluvial ore was scraped and washed in Bascharage, Pétange, Differdange, Esch, Kayl and Bettembourg. In terms of factories, there was only the blast furnace of Lasauvage. There were no cities. Esch, which would later become a city, had at this time only 1,400 inhabitants. In Esch, there were two tanneries.

After an administrative reorganisation, necessitated by the partition, a decree of 12 October 1842 transferred the justice of the peace, and therefore the administrative centre of the canton, from Bettembourg to Esch. The reason was that, due to the additions to the west and the territorial losses in the east mentioned above, the canton's centre had moved to the west, and now, more than ever, Bettembourg was on the periphery.

However, the question of its administrative centre came up again when, in 1849, the Chamber of Deputies, considered a bill to re-establish the justice of the peace in Bettembourg, and therefore the canton's centre. Four communes of the canton supported it, while seven opposed it. The government was also against it, and the bill failed.

In 1860, the mayors of Clemency, Dippach, Bascharage, Pétange, Sanem and Differdange addressed a petition to the Assembly of Estates, demanding that due to their great distance from the canton's centre Esch, they should be carved off and organised into their own new canton of Bascharage. The petition was not taken into consideration by the Assembly.

Since then, the canton of Esch has seen several internal changes.

Since 1847, the inhabitants of Leudelange had asked to be separated from the commune of Reckange, and to be organised into a distinct commune. As justification they invoked Reckange's distance of more than 6 km, the fact that Leudelange was already a parish and that, until 1821, there had been a commune of Leudelange. At the session of the Estates of 15 February 1856, this was approved by 33 votes to 3. Then, in 1862, in a petition to the Estates, the commune of Leudelange demanded to be detached from the canton of Esch to be added to that of Luxembourg. This petition was rejected.

In 1906, the title of city was awarded to Esch-sur-Alzette, and the following year, to Differdange, Dudelange, and Rumelange.

Population of major cities
	1847	1947	1960
Esch-sur-Alzette	1,469	26,851	27,954
Differdange	1,028	15,179	17,673
Dudelange	1,155	12,878	14,617
Rumelange	546	4,072	4,271

== Administrative divisions ==
Esch-sur-Alzette Canton consists of the following fourteen communes:

- Bettembourg
- Differdange
- Dudelange
- Esch-sur-Alzette
- Frisange
- Kayl
- Leudelange
- Mondercange
- Pétange
- Reckange-sur-Mess
- Roeser
- Rumelange
- Sanem
- Schifflange

== Population ==
Historical population

Year	Pop.	±%
1821	12,078	—
1851	16,661	+37.9%
1900	51,964	+211.9%
1910	68,579	+32.0%
1922	74,329	+8.4%
1935	97,943	+31.8%

Year	Pop.	±%
1947	94,904	−3.1%
1960	108,379	+14.2%
1970	114,778	+5.9%
1981	114,483	−0.3%
1990	115,065	+0.5%
2000	130,809	+13.7%

Year	Pop.	±%
2005	141,153	+7.9%
2010	150,647	+6.7%
2015	164,604	+9.3%
2020	183,364	+11.4%
2021	185,184	+1.0%

Source data

== See also ==
- Esch-sur-Alzette (Chamber of Deputies of Luxembourg constituency)
