= Noerdange =

Coordinates: 49°45′N 5°56′E

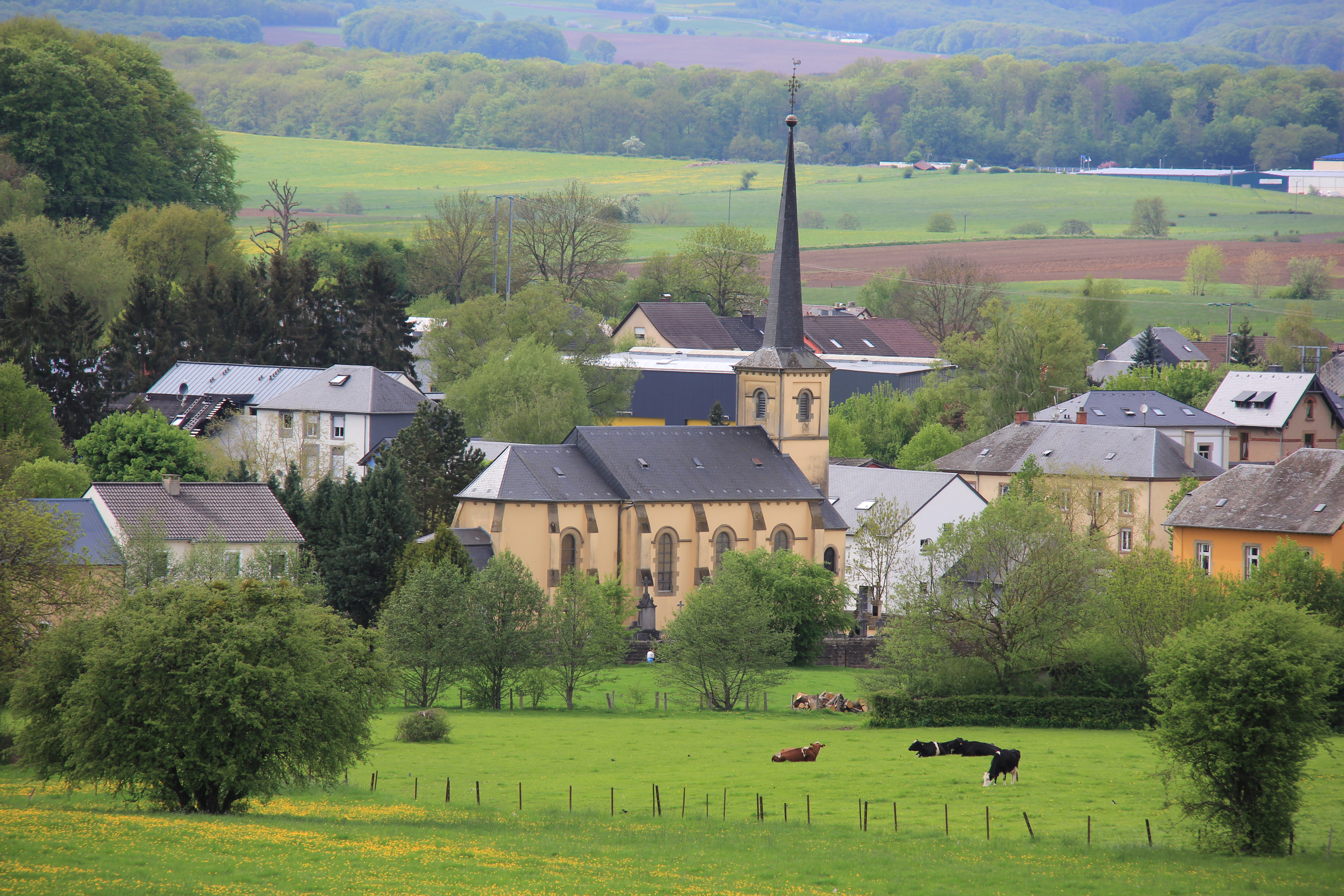
The Näerden church seen from the high mountain

Noerdange (Luxembourgish: Näerden, German: Noerdingen) is a small town in the commune of Beckerich, in western Luxembourg. As of September 2026, the town has a population of 614.
