= Ospern =

Coordinates: 49°47′N 5°54′E

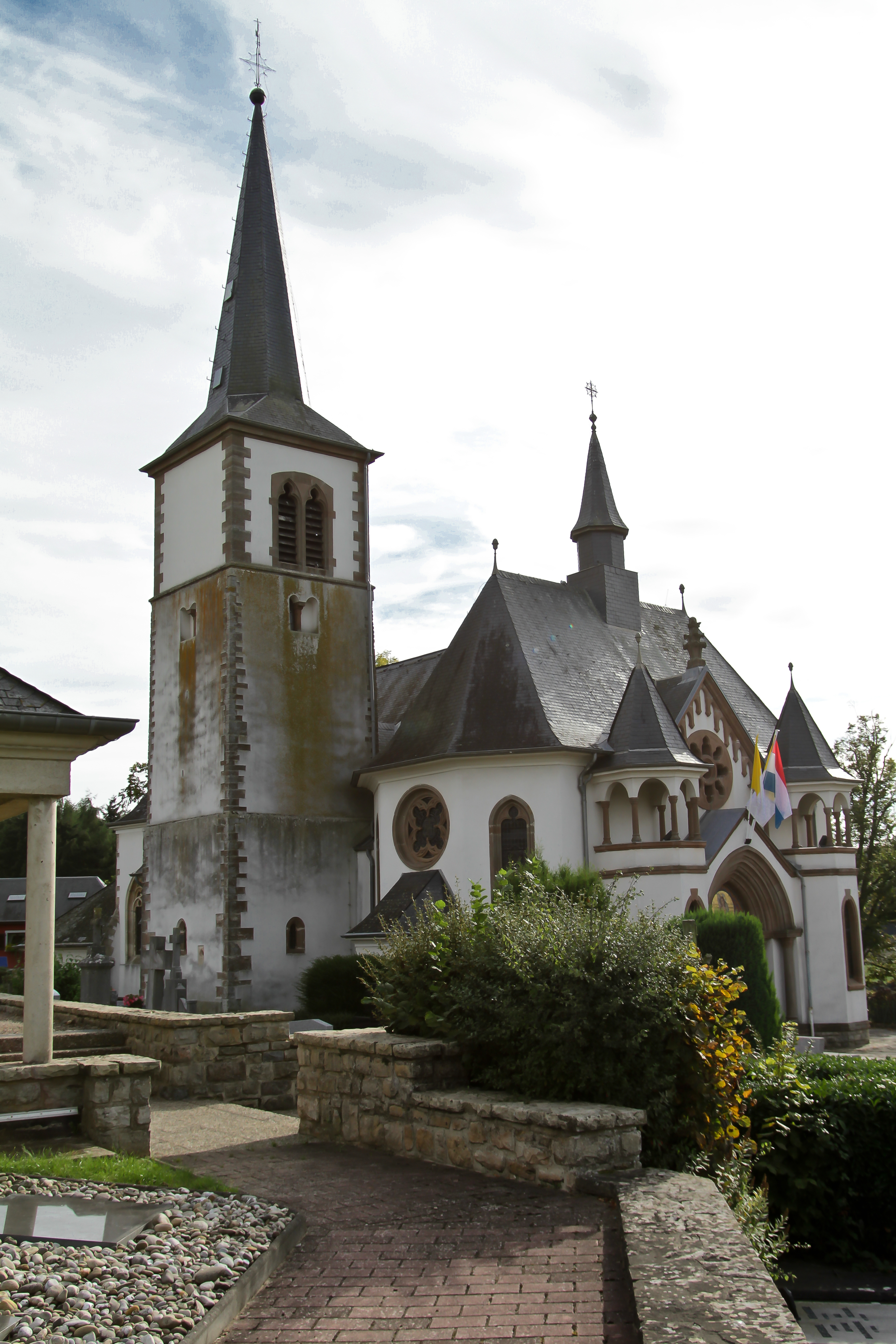

Ospern (Luxembourgish: Osper) is a small town in the commune of Redange-sur-Attert, in western Luxembourg. As of September 2026, the town has a population of 424.

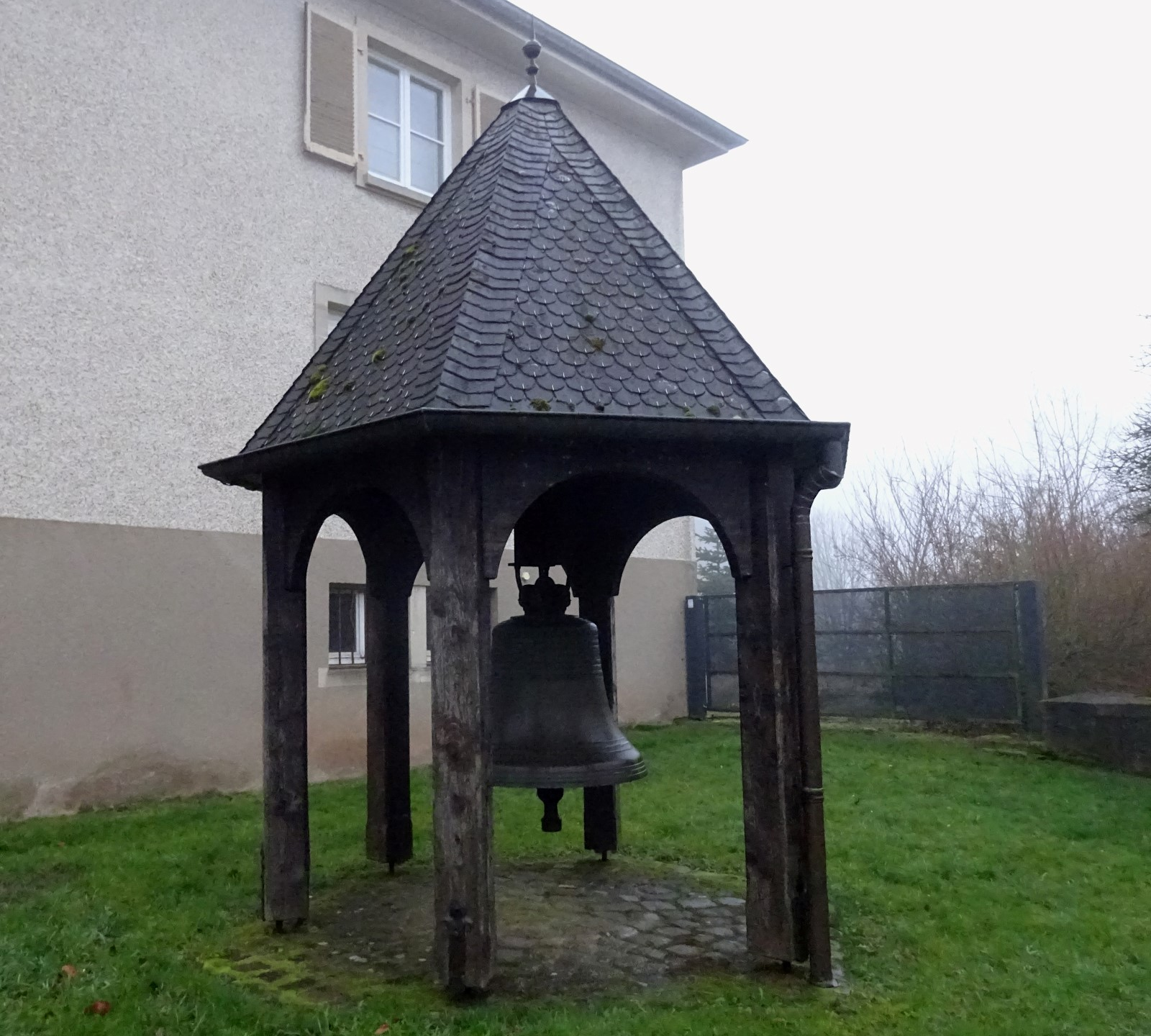

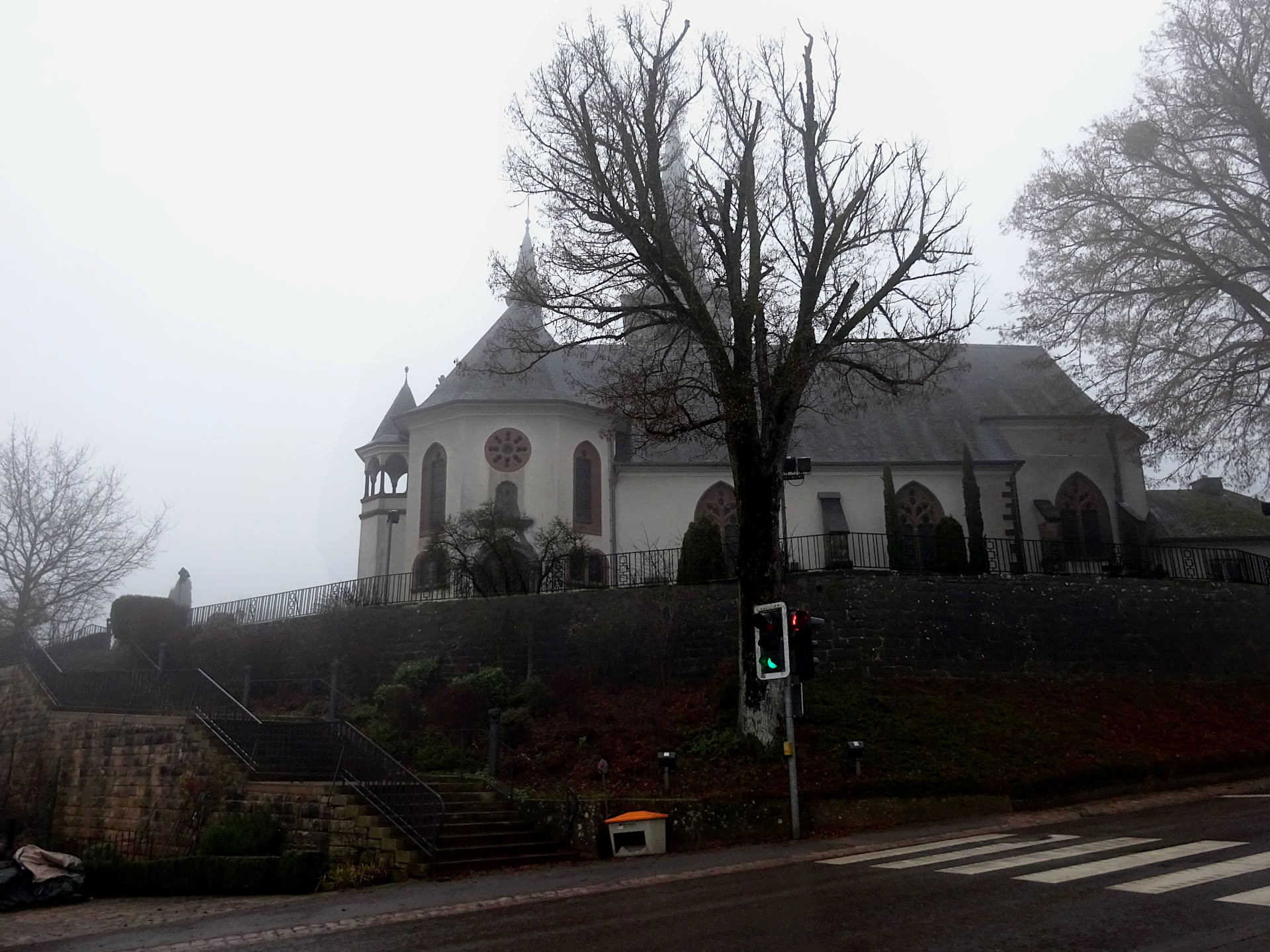

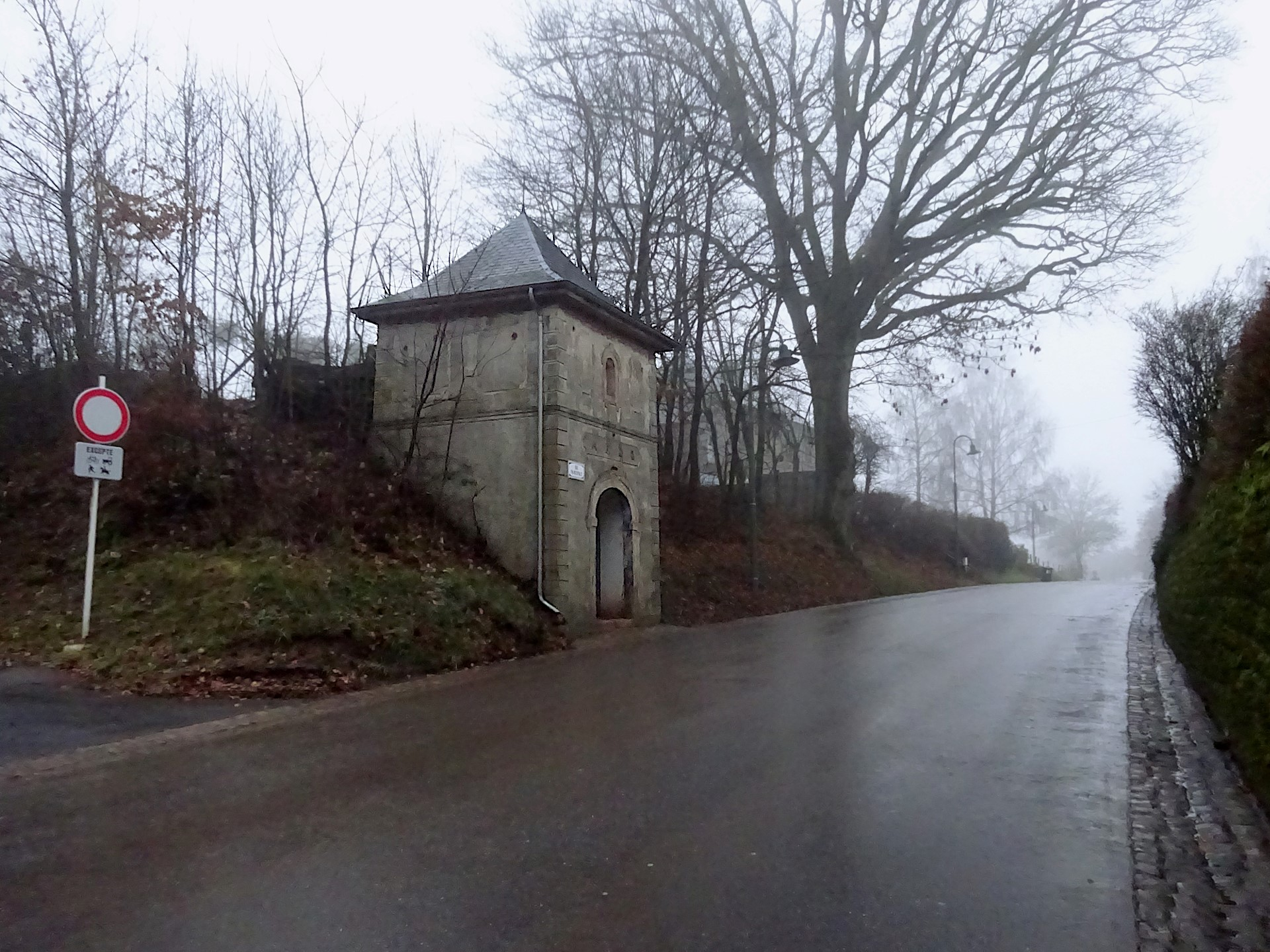
