= Narrow-gauge railways in Luxembourg =

Luxembourg has a rich history of narrow-gauge railways. A few industrial and mining railways survive.

== Metre-gauge railways, the Jhangeli ==
The name Jhangeli was commonly used for the metre-gauge network in Luxembourg. The lines were operated by different companies. Some lines were financed by the state of Luxembourg by means of granting exploration rights of iron ore to the railway companies. In the case of the Luxembourg–Remich line, for example, 3.3 ha of iron ore fields was granted per km built.

Luxemburger Sekundärbahnen (LSB) / Chemins de fer Secondaires Luxembourgeois (CSL), 1880–1934

- Luxembourg (city)–Remich S 27,15 km, 1882–1955
- Cruchten–Larochette (Fels) S 12,12 km, 1882–1948
- Larochette–Carrières Ernzen S 4,12 km, 1930–1948

Kantonalbahngesellschaft / Chemins de Fer Cantonaux (CC), 1880–1923

- Diekirch–Vianden C 14,11 km, 1889–1948
- Noerdange–Martelange C 29,54 km, 1890-1953

Vizinalbahnen / Chemins de Fer Vicinaux (CV), 1899–1934

- Bettembourg–Aspelt V 10,19 km, 1899–1952
- Luxembourg–Echternach V 45,85 km, 1904–1954

Prinz Heinrich Eisenbahn / Chemins de fer Prince Henri (PH) 1868–1877 – 1940–1948

- Grundhof–Beaufort PH 7,4 km 1904–1948

== Industrial railways ==
Numerous industrial railways were constructed at Differdange, Dudelange, Esch-sur-Alzette, Petange, Rumelange, Wasserbillig and others.

== Mining railways ==
Hundreds of kilometers of mining railways were created, above and underground, for companies like ARBED (now ArcelorMittal), predominantly at the gauge of 700 mm (2 ft 3 9/16 in), also electrified.

== Decauville railways ==
Several dozens of Decauville railways served local communities, forests and, for example, the Saint-Maurice and Saint Maur Abbey near Clervaux.
