= Schrondweiler =

Coordinates: 49°48′N 6°10′E

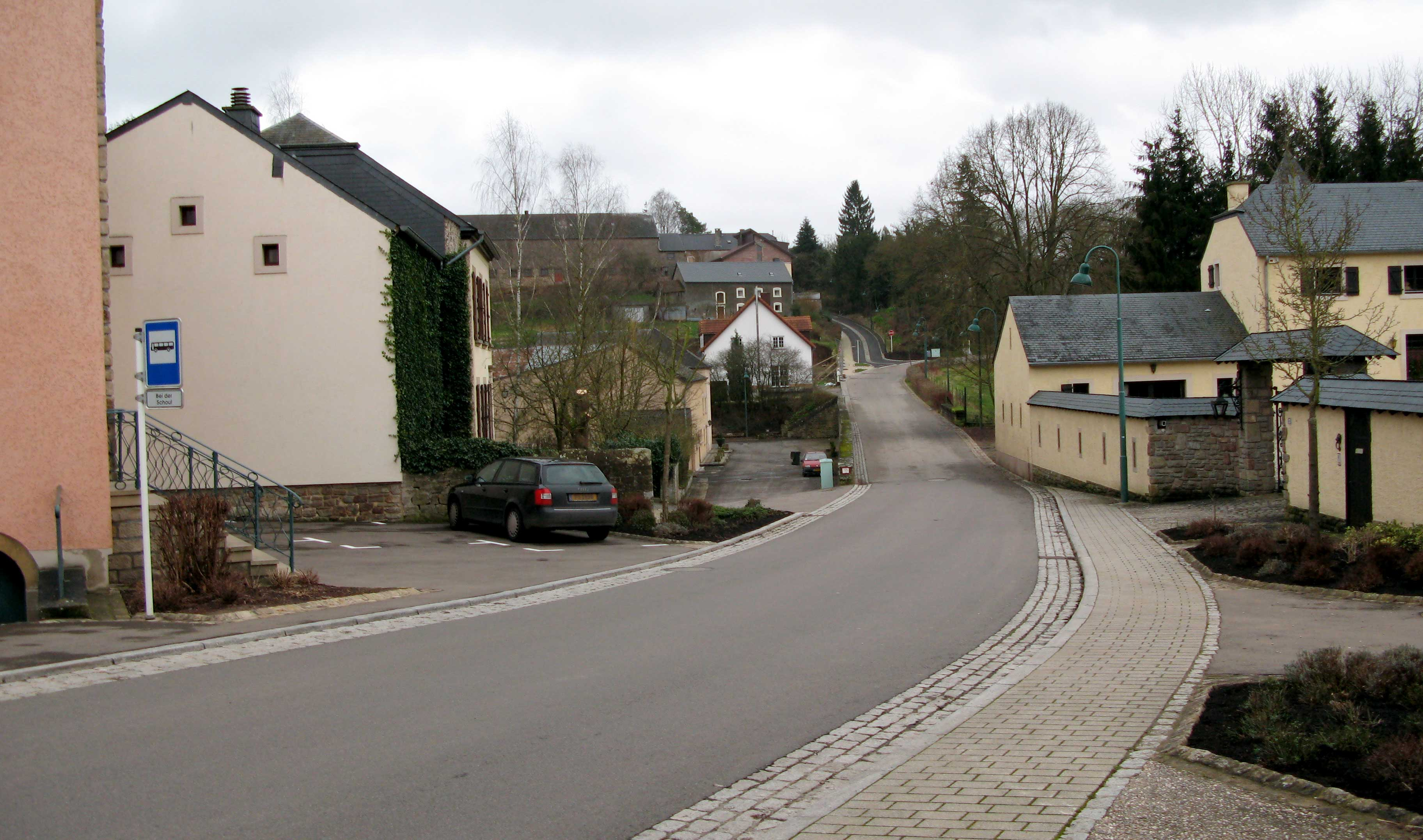
Rue de l'école towards Larochette.

Schrondweiler (German pronunciation: [ˈʃʁɔntvaɪlɐ]) is a village in the commune of Nommern, in central Luxembourg. The village has a population of 444 as of September 2026.

The stream Schrondweilerbaach is crossing the north-eastern part of the village.
