= Black Ernz =

River in Luxembourg

Coordinates: 49.83612°N 6.32989°E

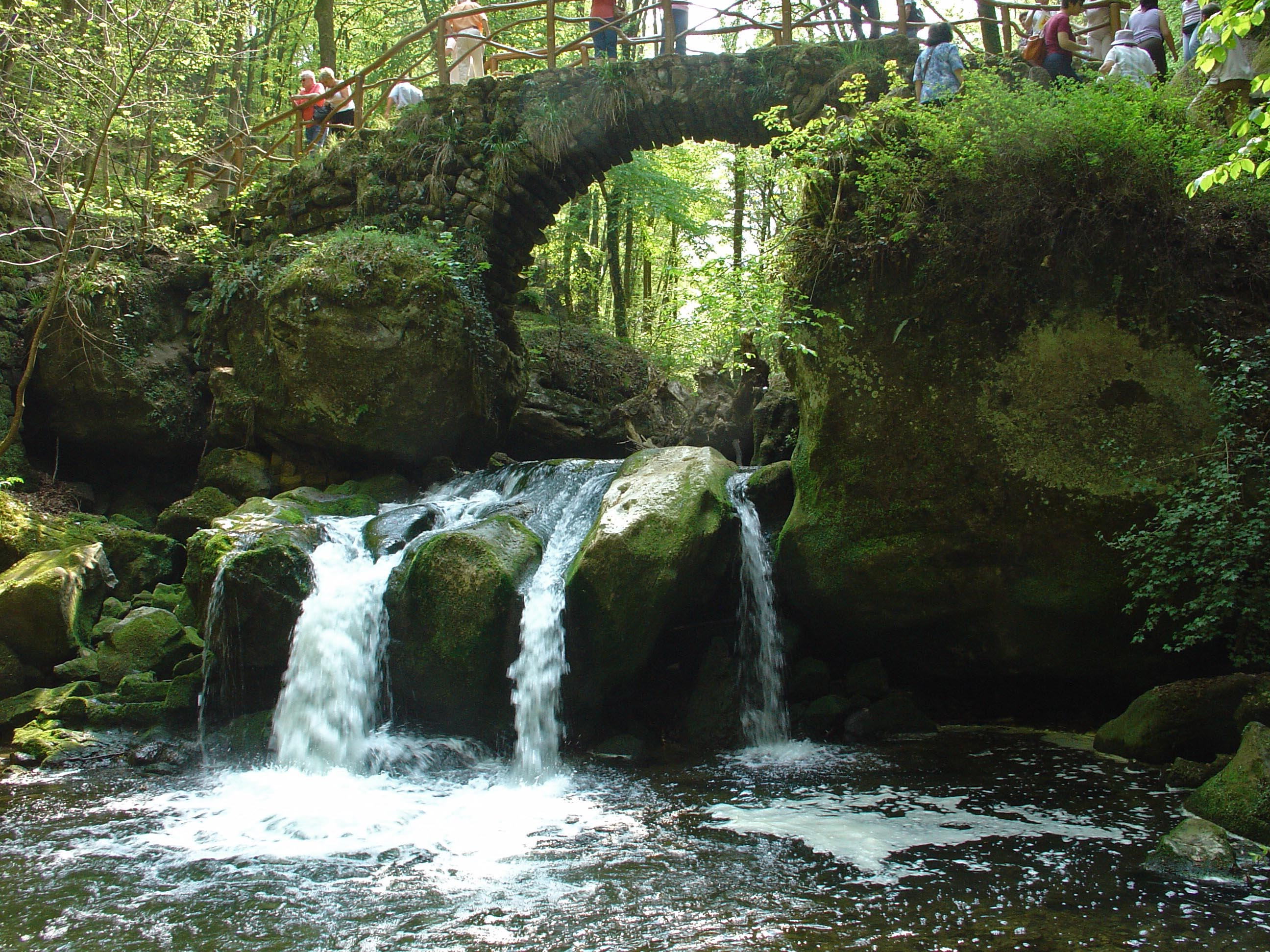
- Schiessentümpel waterfall

Location
- Country: Luxembourg

Physical characteristics
- Source
  - location: Grünewald
- Mouth
  - location: Sauer, at Grundhof
- Length: 25 km (16 mi)

The Black Ernz (Luxembourgish: Schwaarz Iernz, French: Ernz noire, German: Schwarze Ernz) is a river flowing through Luxembourg, joining the Sauer at Grundhof. It flows through the towns of Junglinster and Mullerthal.
