= Larochette Castle =

Castle in Luxembourg

Coordinates: 49°47′08″N 6°13′01″E

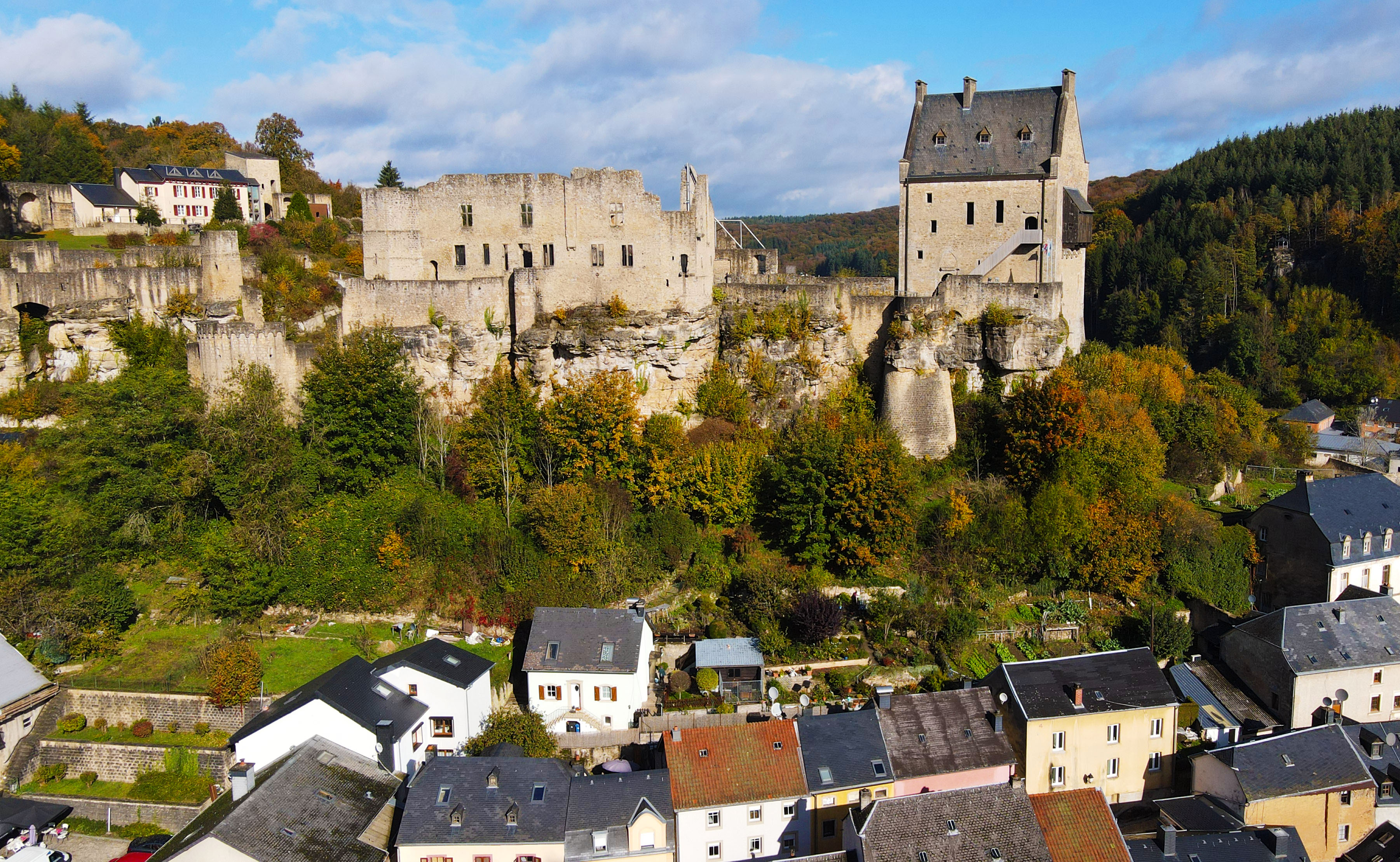
Larochette Castle

Larochette Castle (Luxembourgish: Buerg Fiels, German: Burg Fels, French: Château de Larochette) stands high above the town of Larochette in central Luxembourg. Dating from the 11th century, the castle was destroyed by fire at the end of the 16th century. Since its acquisition by the State of Luxembourg in 1979, some restoration work has been undertaken.

== Location ==
The castle ruins are located on a promontory some 150 metres above the White Ernz which runs through the small town of Larochette. The access road crosses a large farmyard with fortified earthworks. The main building is surrounded by a wall, now partly destroyed. A deep ditch divides the castle into two parts. At the far end of the promontory, the remains of several manor houses attest to the high quality of the architecture and its rather pompous style.

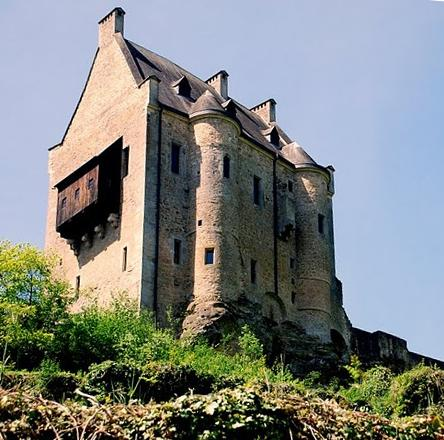
Larochette Castle: main building

== History ==
The earliest references to the castle are from the end of the 11th century and during the 12th century when the lords of Larochette (Van der Feltz) were flag bearers for the counts of Luxembourg. The family proliferated leading to the construction of the five stately houses which are separate from the main structure. They include the Homburg Manor (1350) and the Créhange Manor (1385) both of which have now been restored. The Verlorenkost (literally Lost Food) watchtower also stands alone on the south side. The legend goes that the cook was carrying pots full of food when she stumbled, breaking everything.

The Créhange manor now contains period artwork. There is a well inside which also has its legend, telling how the lady of the castle jumped into the well with her child while the castle was under attack. After rescuing the brave woman, the invaders accused the steward of the castle of treason and threw him into the well. It is said that he reappears every Good Friday in the form of a dragon.

== Visiting times ==
The castle is open to the public from Easter until the end of October, every day from 10 am to 6 pm.

== See also ==
- List of castles in Luxembourg

== Gallery ==
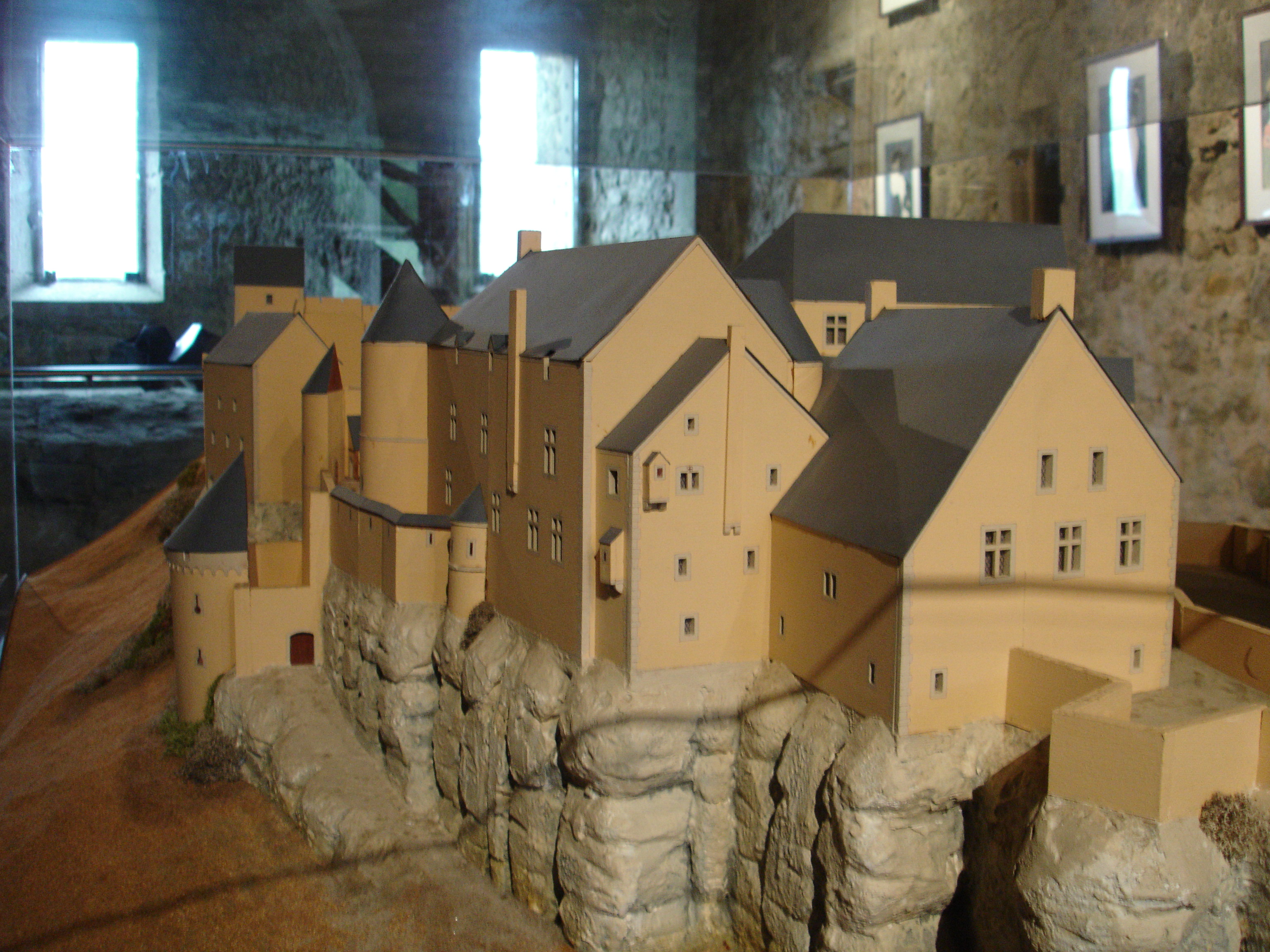
Reconstructed model

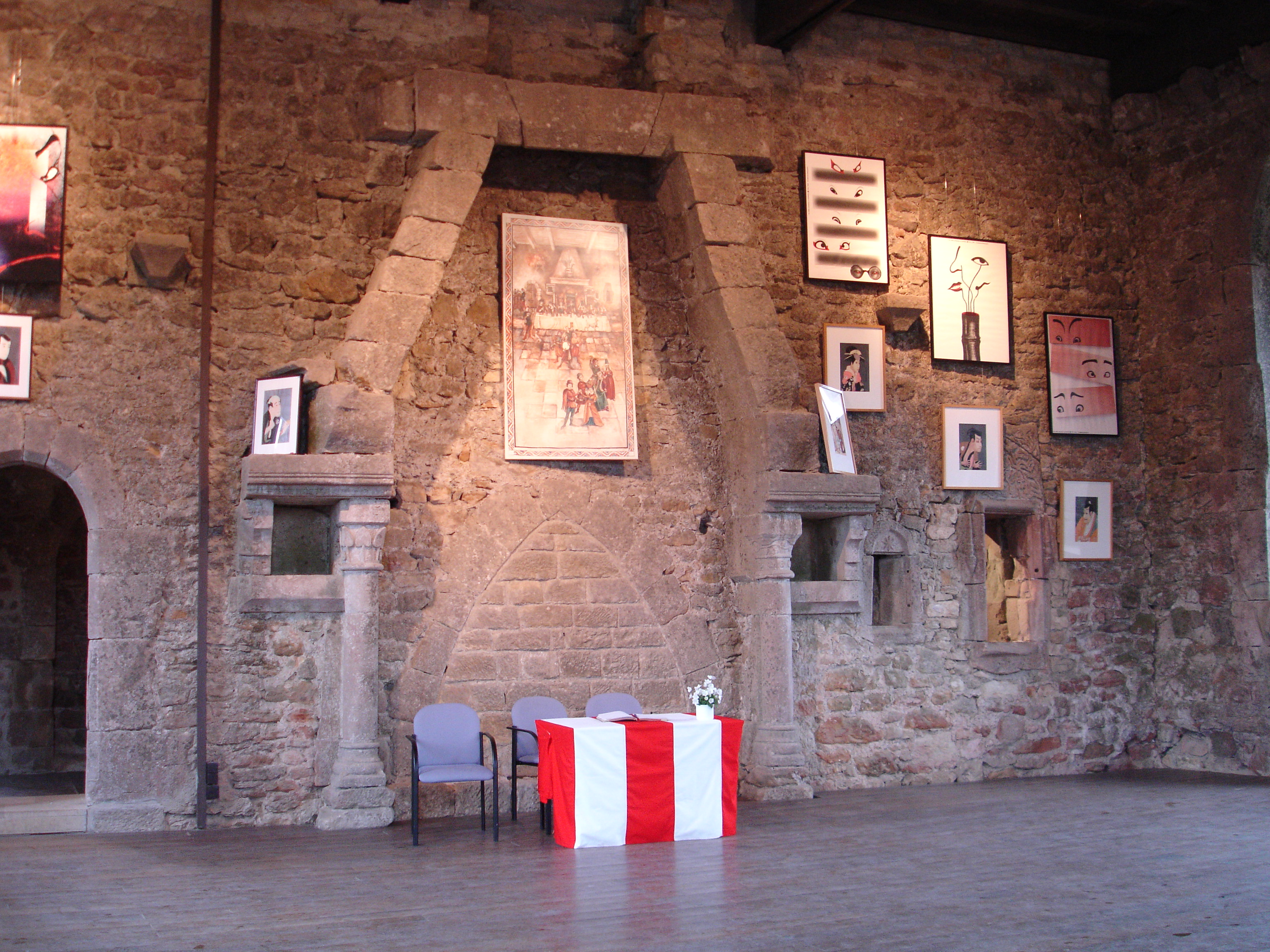
Interior

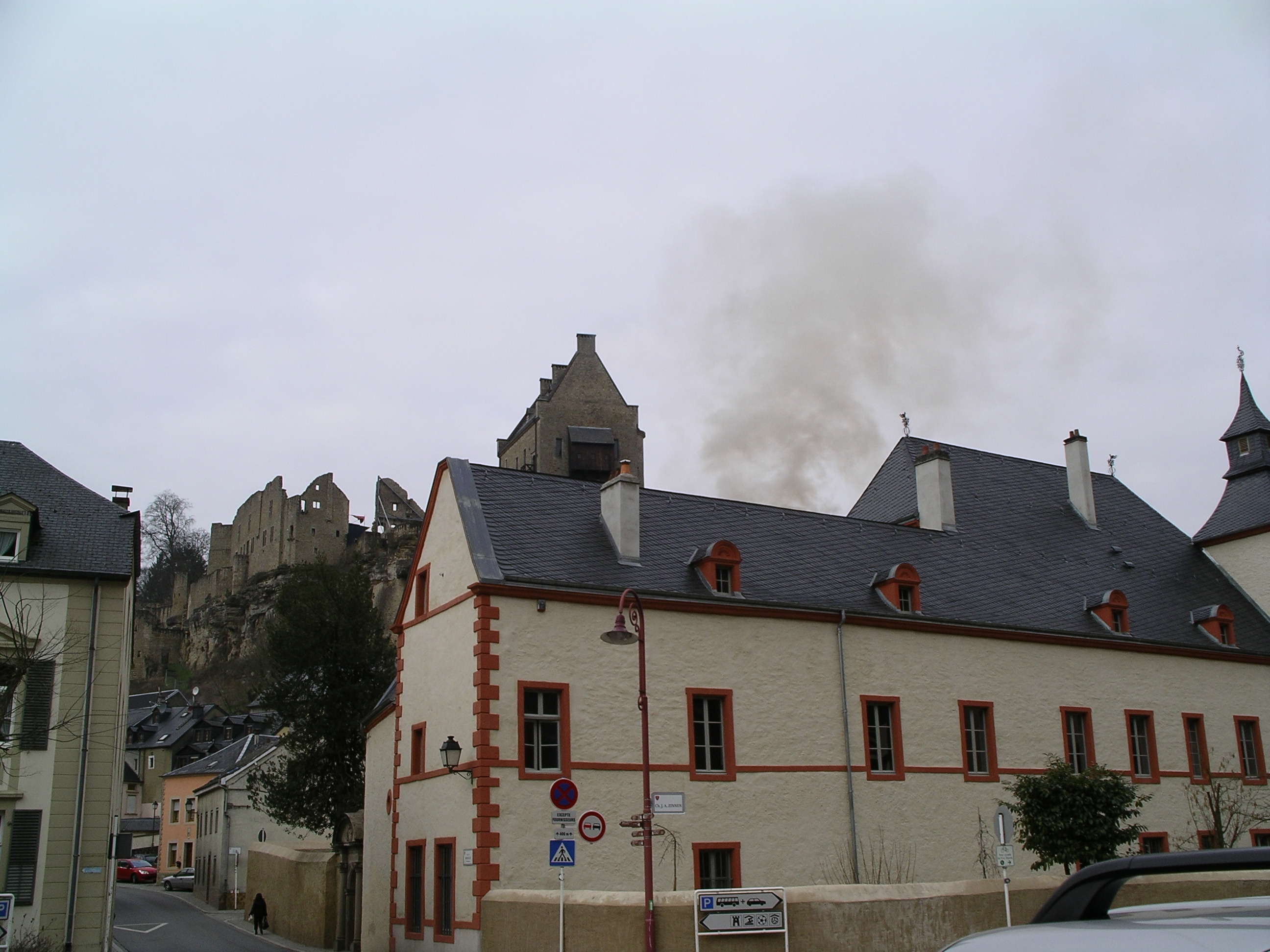
Ruins from town centre

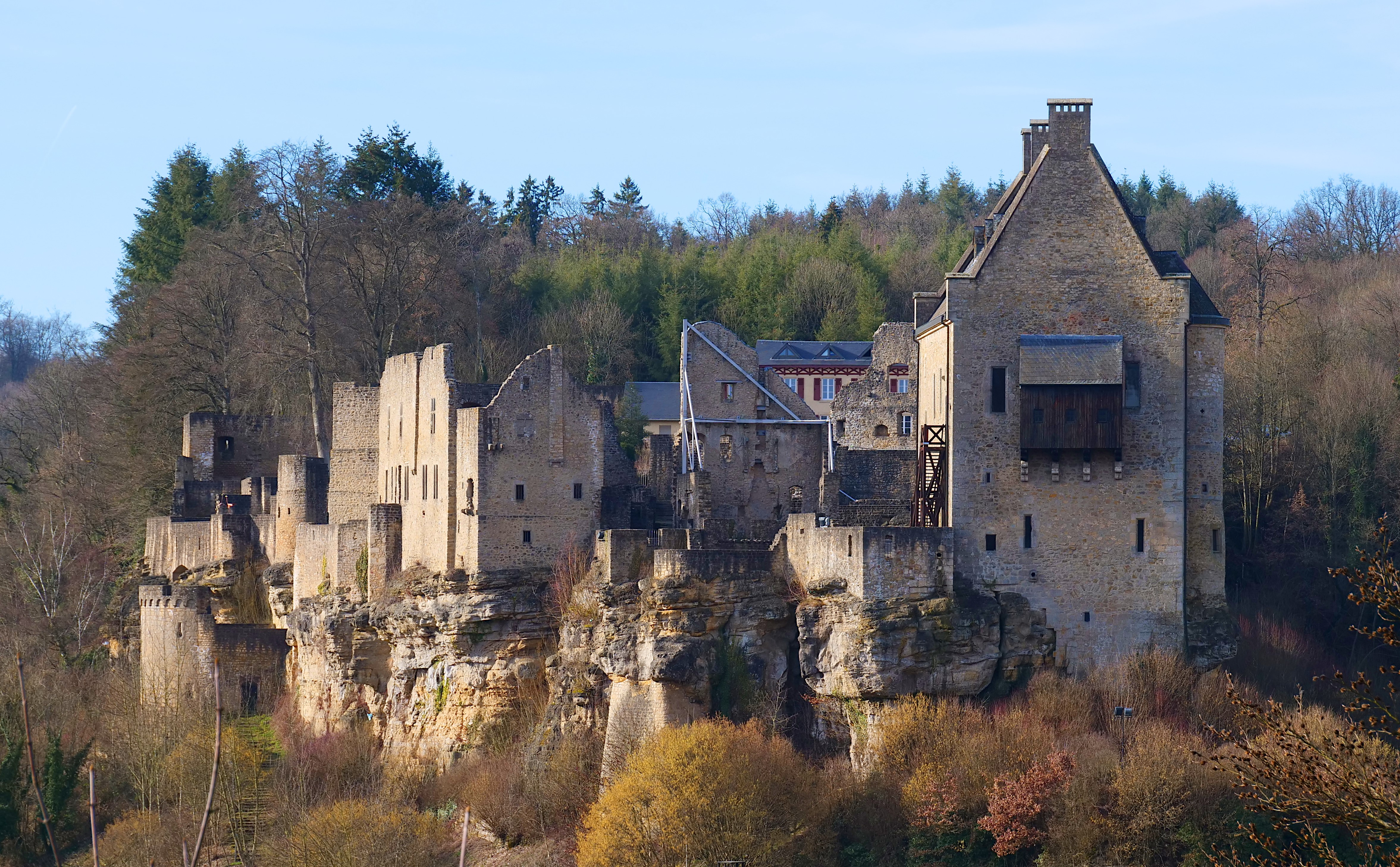
East side
