= Grünewald (Luxembourg) =

Forest in central Luxembourg

Coordinates: 49°39′40″N 6°10′52″E

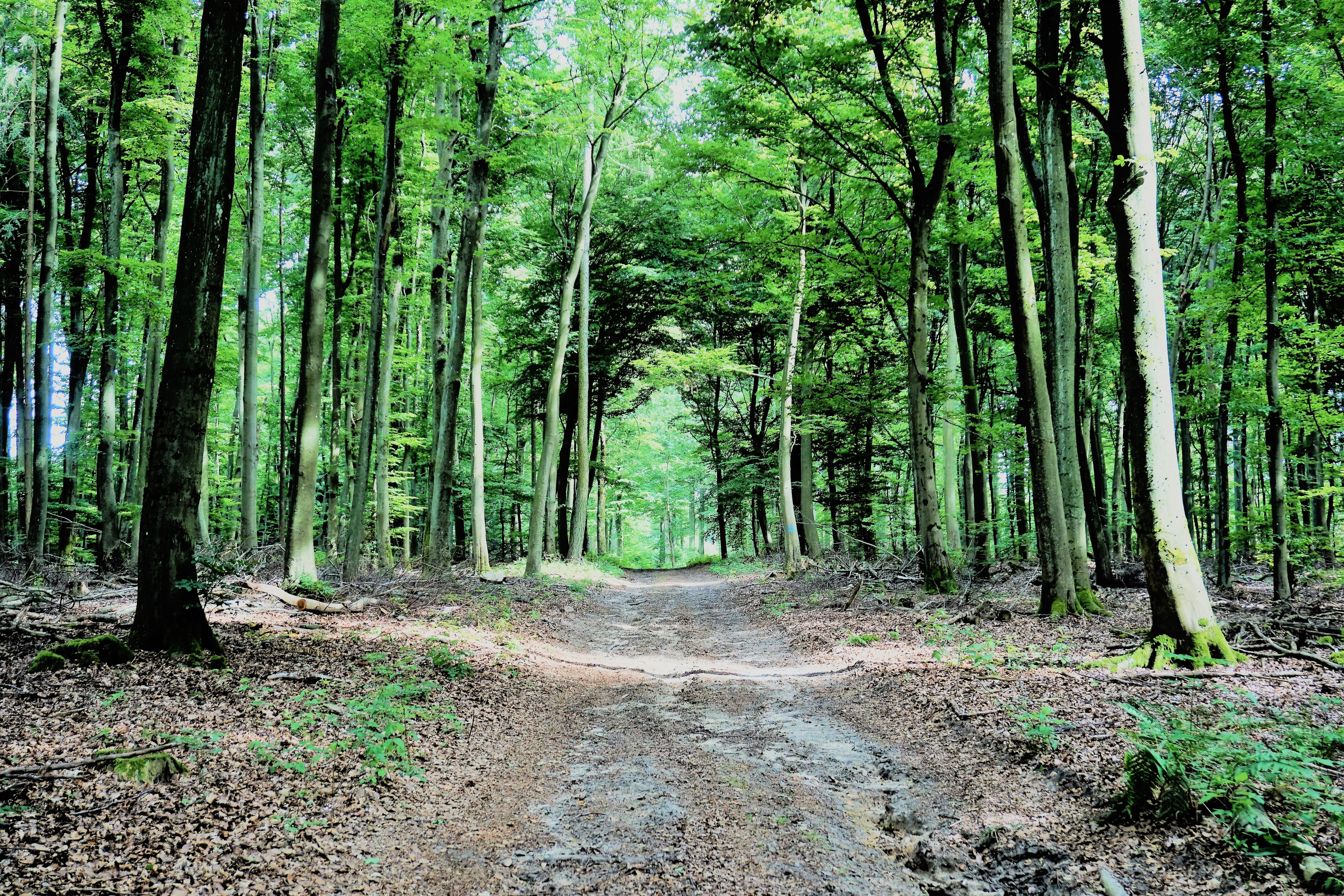
Gréngewald in the summer

The Grünewald (Luxembourgish: Gréngewald) is a forest in central Luxembourg, most of which is owned by the national government. At 3,734 hectares in size, it is the largest forest in Luxembourg, stretching through the communes of Luxembourg City, Niederanven, Steinsel, Walferdange, Lorentzweiler, Junglinster and Sandweiler; the centre of the forest is situated 6 kilometres (3.7 mi) north-east of central Luxembourg City. As a result of its proximity to Luxembourg's capital city, it is a popular destination for tourism, leisure, and hospitality. Within the Grünewald are the sources of the Black Ernz and the White Ernz.

== History ==
The Grünewald is held in great affection by the Luxembourgish people, dating back to the formation of the country in the 1840s. In 1846, the government proposed selling the 6.69 square kilometres (1650 acres) remaining of the forest to raise money for economic development. The forest was bought by Baron Ziegesar for 530,000 Dutch guilders, and presented to Grand Duke William II. In grand ducal possession, the Grünewald's territory was expanded greatly by a series of acquisitions.

In 1890, however, the end of the personal union between the Netherlands and Luxembourg meant the owner of the Grünewald was no longer the Luxembourgish sovereign, but Queen Wilhelmina of the Netherlands. The following year Grand Duke Adolphe bought the forest, by now 24.43 km^{2} (6,037 acres) in size, from the Dutch crown for 2,788,798 francs. Over the following 35 years, the territory was augmented further by a series of separate purchases; during the same period, some areas of the Grünewald were sold off.

Due to financial hardship at the height of the Great Depression, in 1934, Grand Duchess Charlotte sold much of the Grünewald, together with Berg Castle, to the Luxembourgish government. Of the total price tag for the two properties of 40 M francs, 20 M was denoted for the Grünewald; this was seen to have undervalued the forest (as it did the castle), as it had been assessed by the government as being worth 25 M francs. The sale included 7.76 km^{2} (1,920 acres) of the forest, leaving 10 km^{2} (2,500 acres) in the hands of the Grand Duchess. Urban legend has it that Charlotte's husband, Prince Félix, lost the Grünewald at a casino, but this is false; the revenue went to pay for the upkeep of the grand-ducal household, and was not spent on personal consumption, let alone gambling losses.

Since 1934, the size of the Grünewald has fallen, mostly as a result of expansion of Luxembourg City and the construction of numerous roads in and around the area.

== Gallery ==
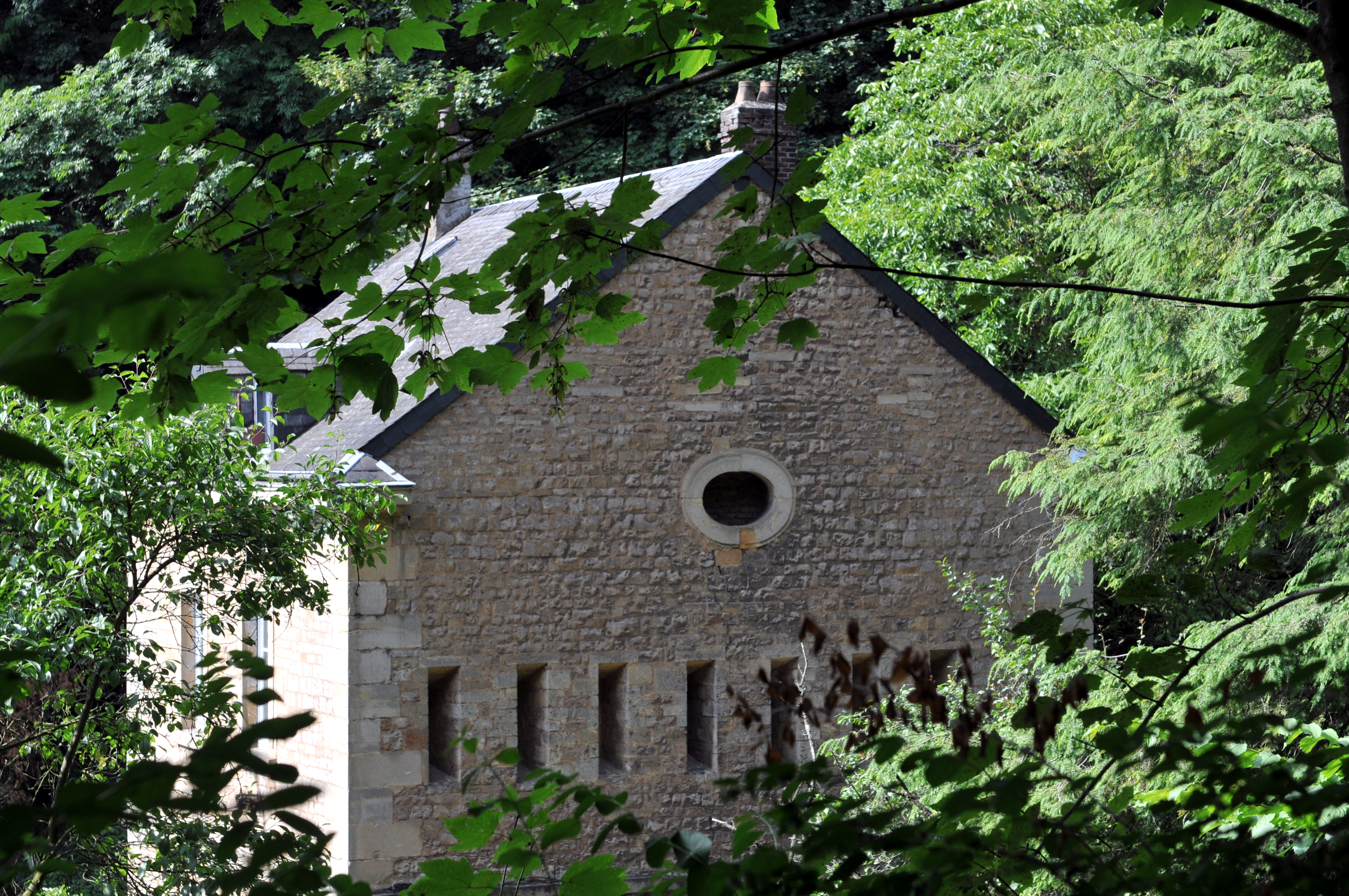
Porte du Grünewald (Gate to Grünewald) in Luxembourg City

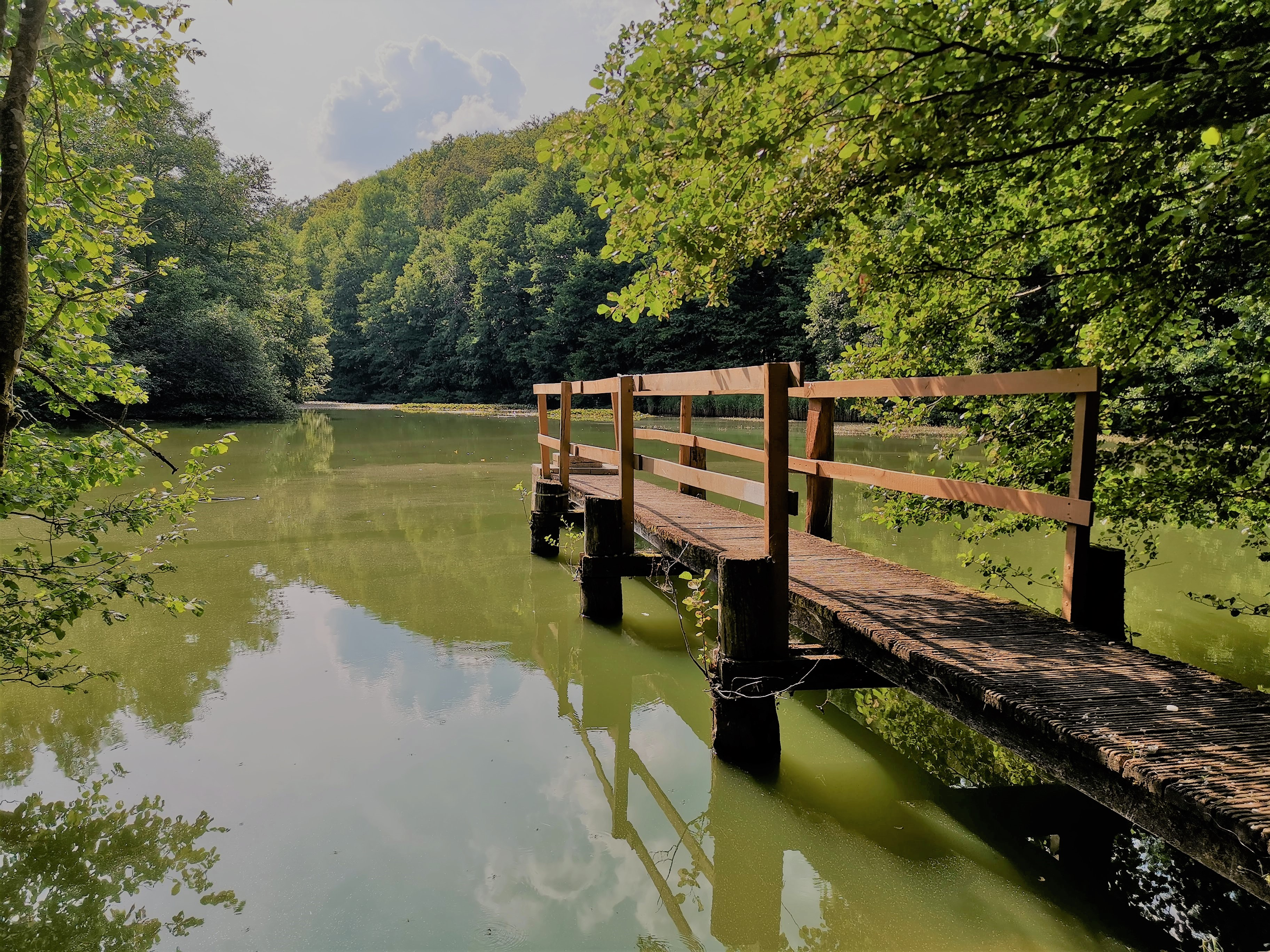
A pond in the woods

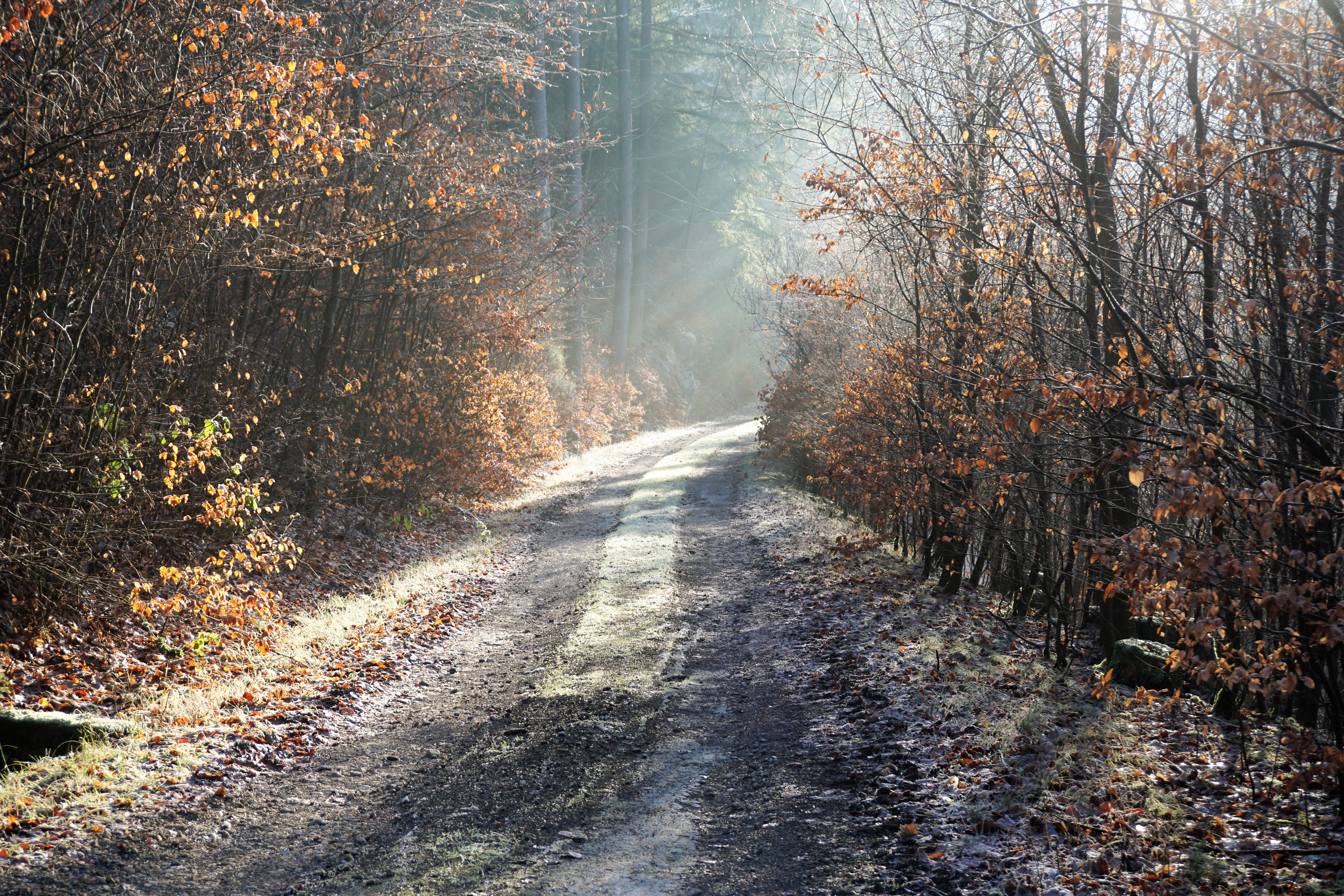
Winter

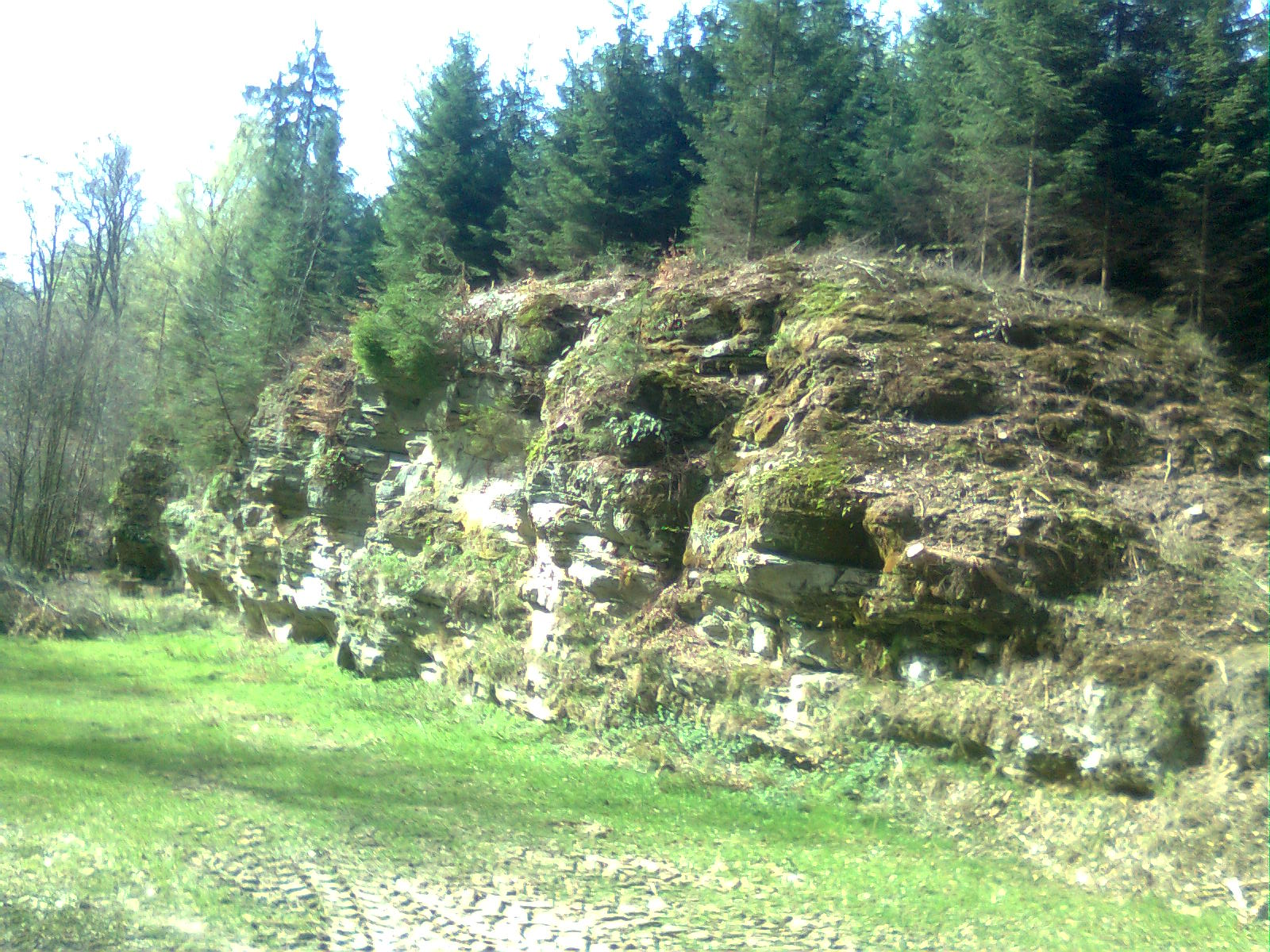
Rocky outcrops

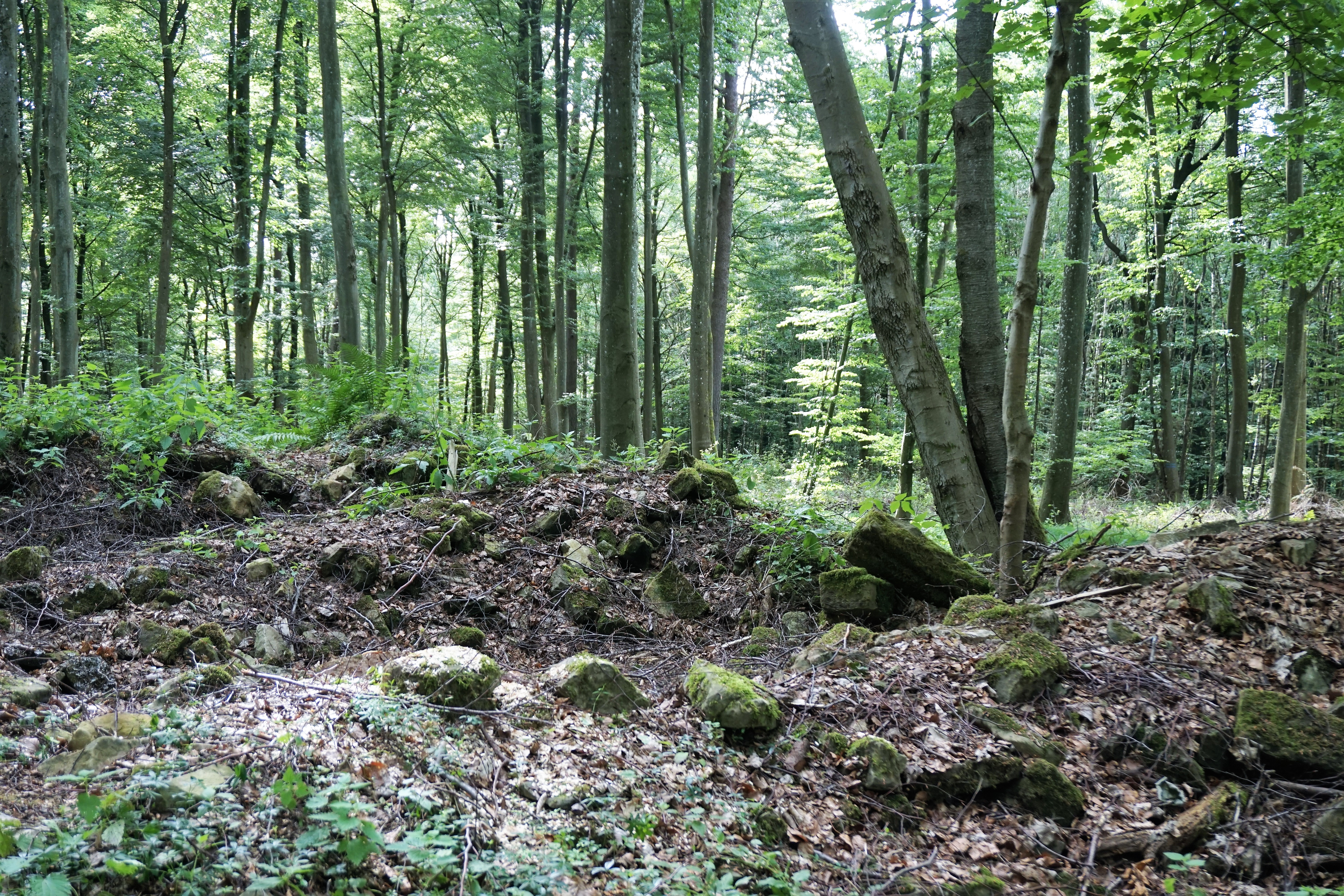
Ruins

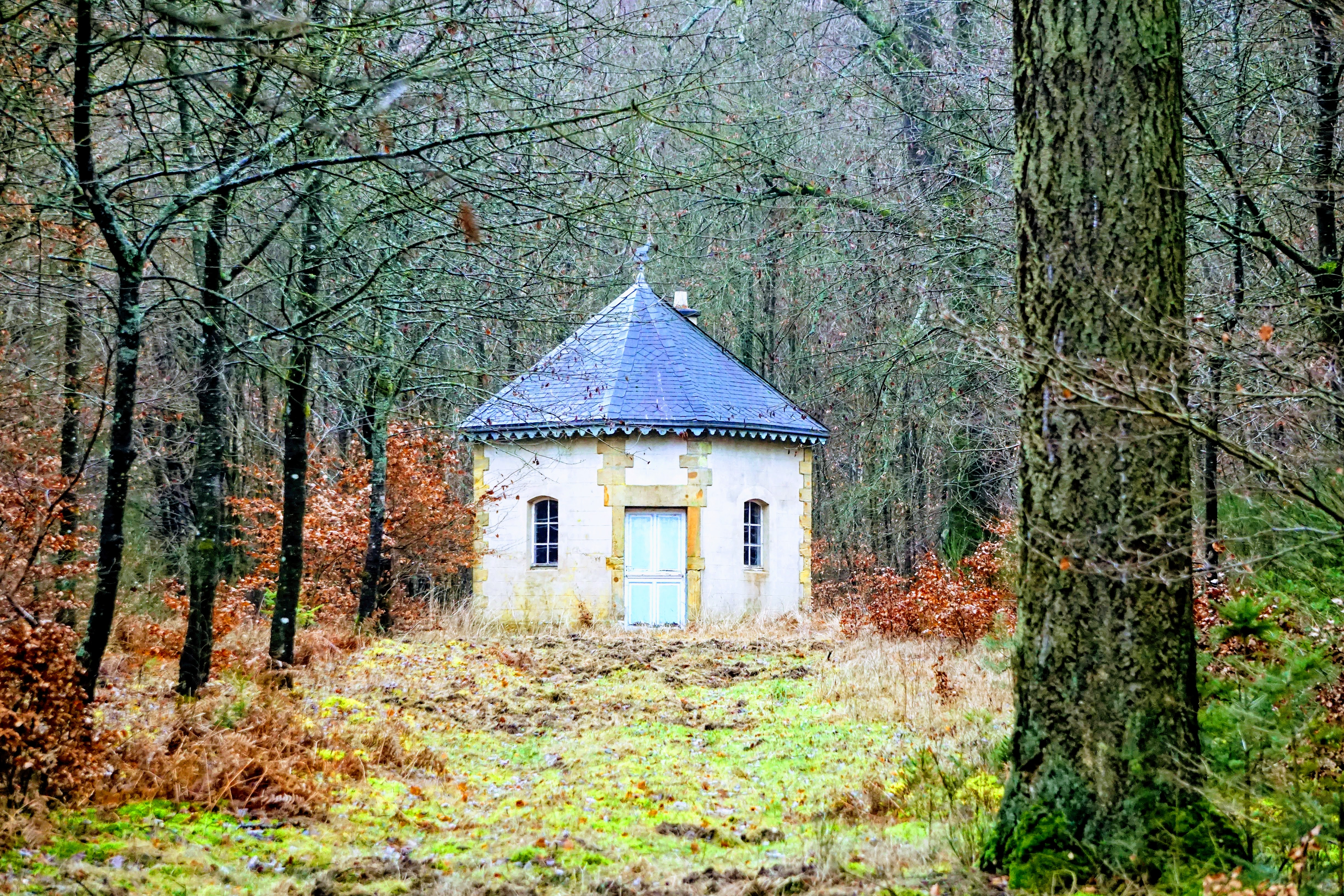
An old pavilion

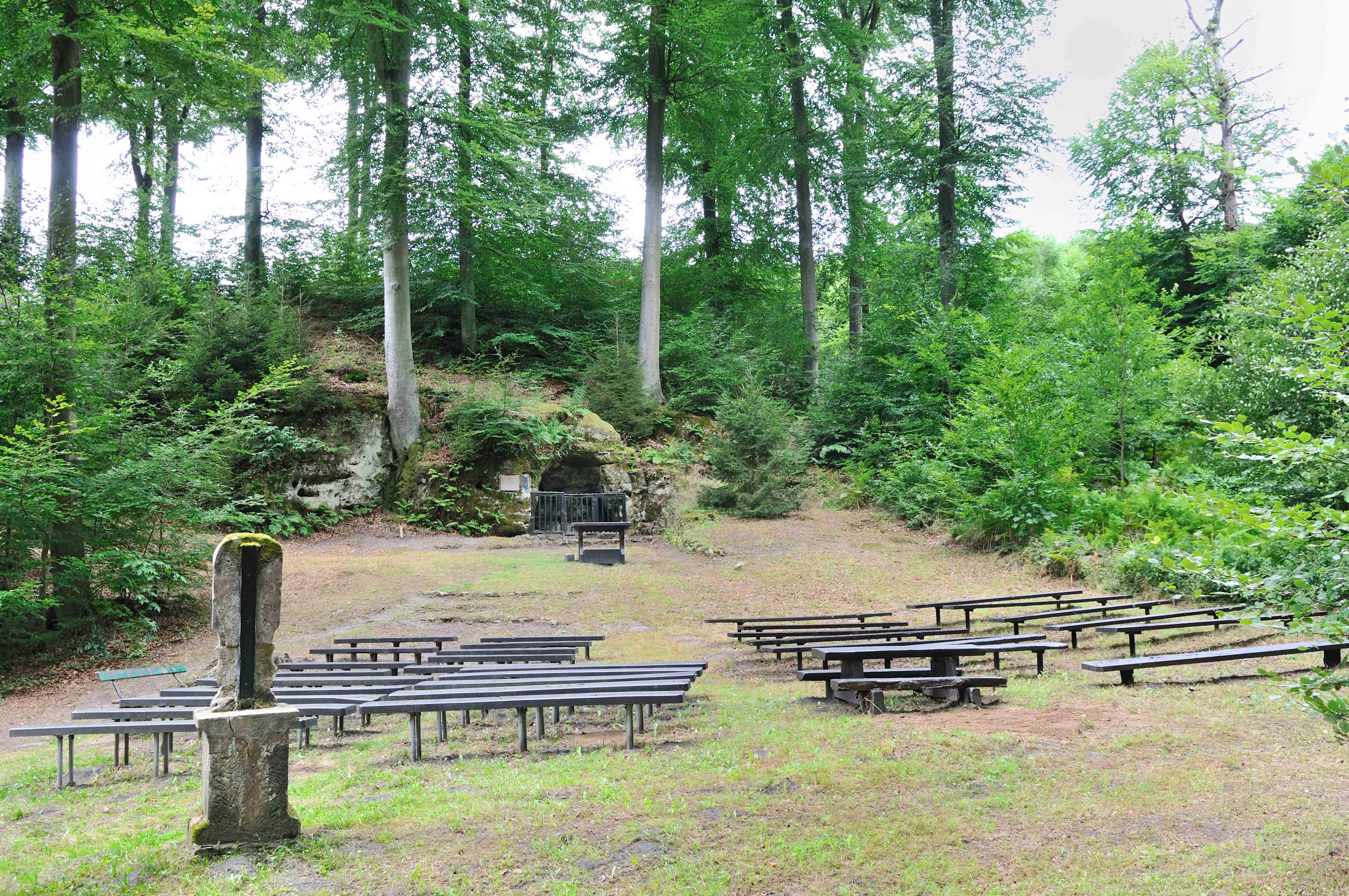
Catholic heritage site

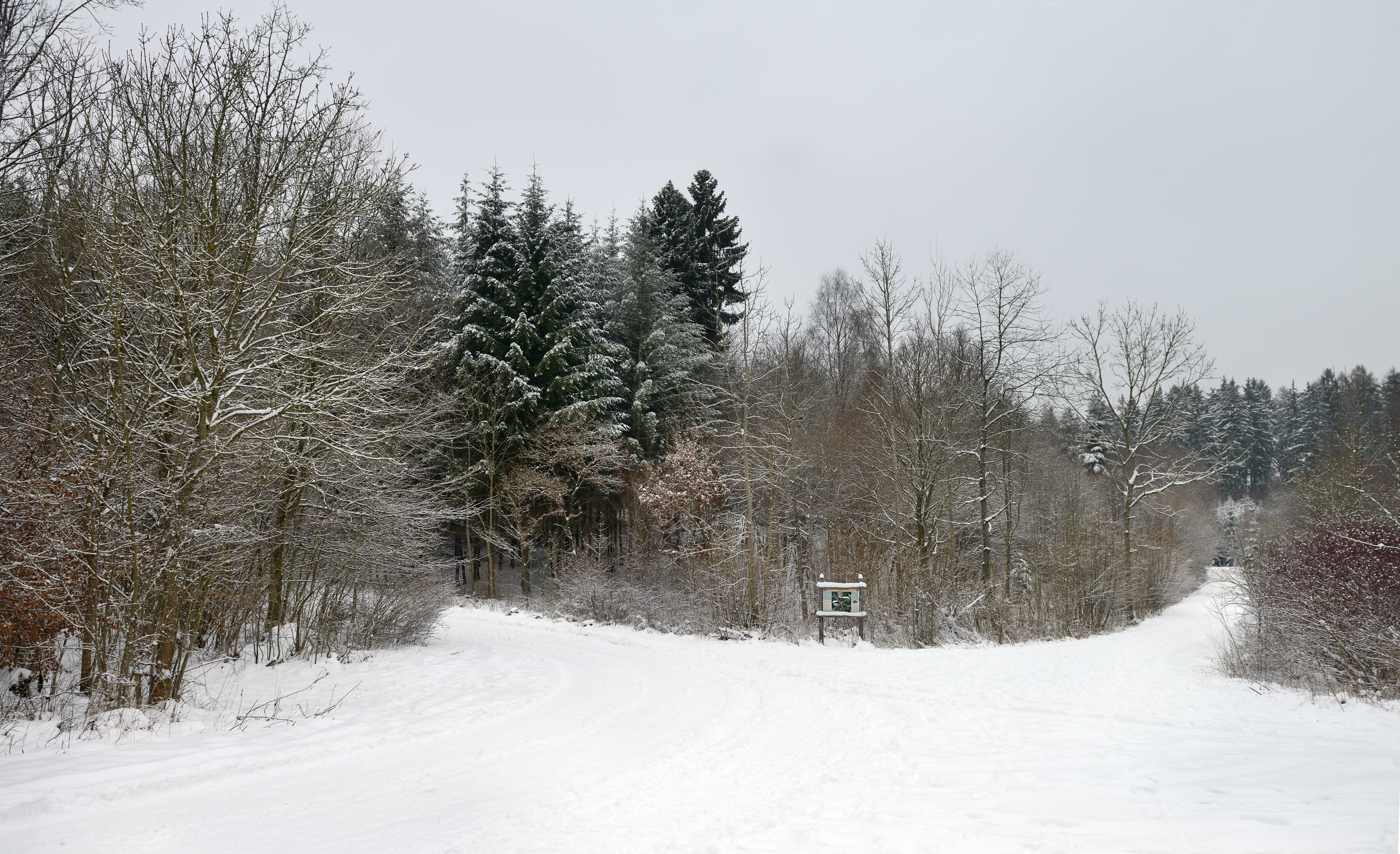
Lieu-dit Rendez-vous
