= Weilerbach, Luxembourg =

Town in Berdorf, Luxembourg

Coordinates: 49°50′N 6°23′E

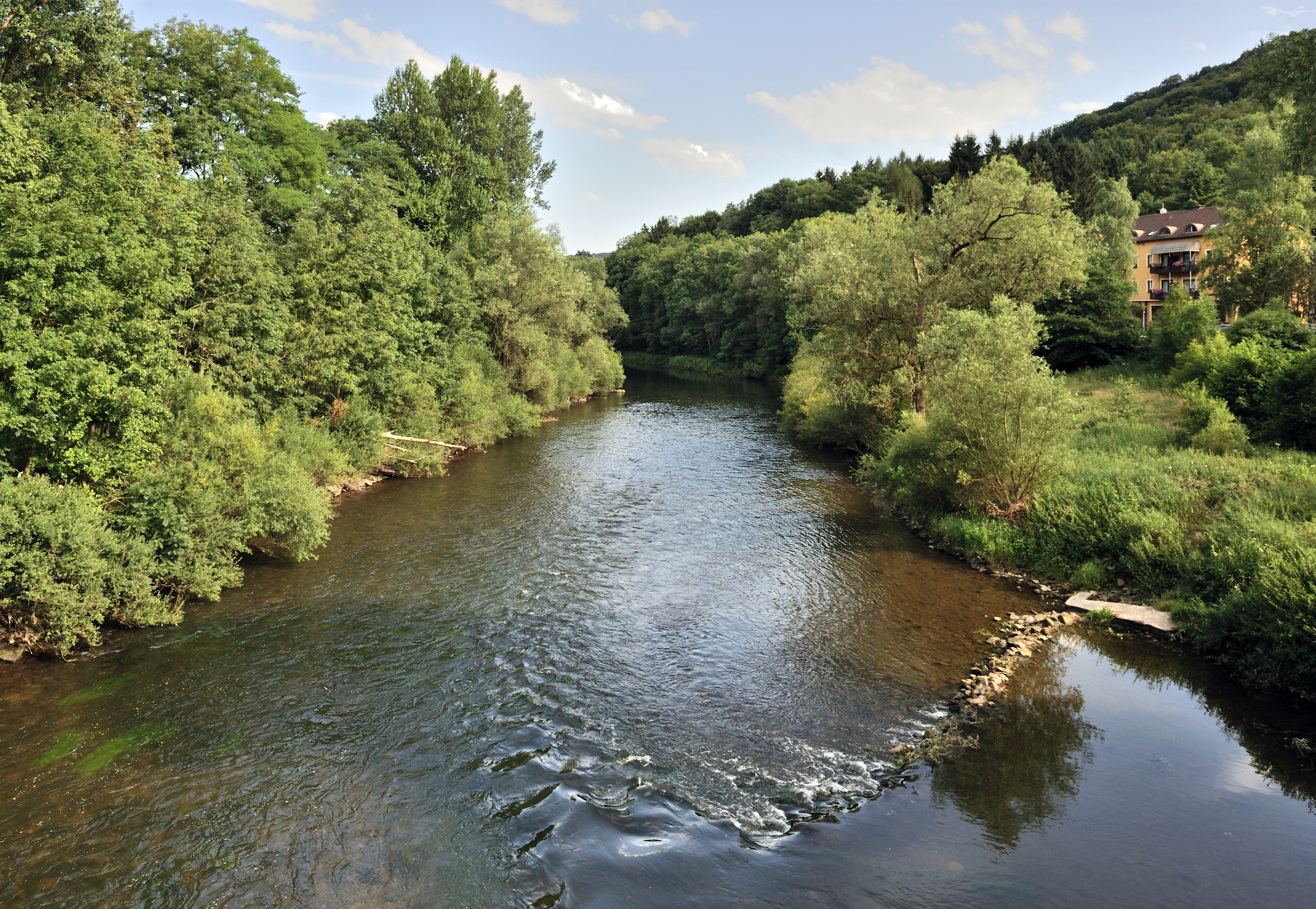
Sûre River at Weilerbach

Weilerbach (German pronunciation: [ˈvaɪlɐbax]; Luxembourgish: Weilerbaach) is a small town in the commune of Berdorf, in eastern Luxembourg. As of September 2026, the town has a population of 322.
