= Berdorf =

Berdorf Bäerdref (Luxembourgish)
- Commune
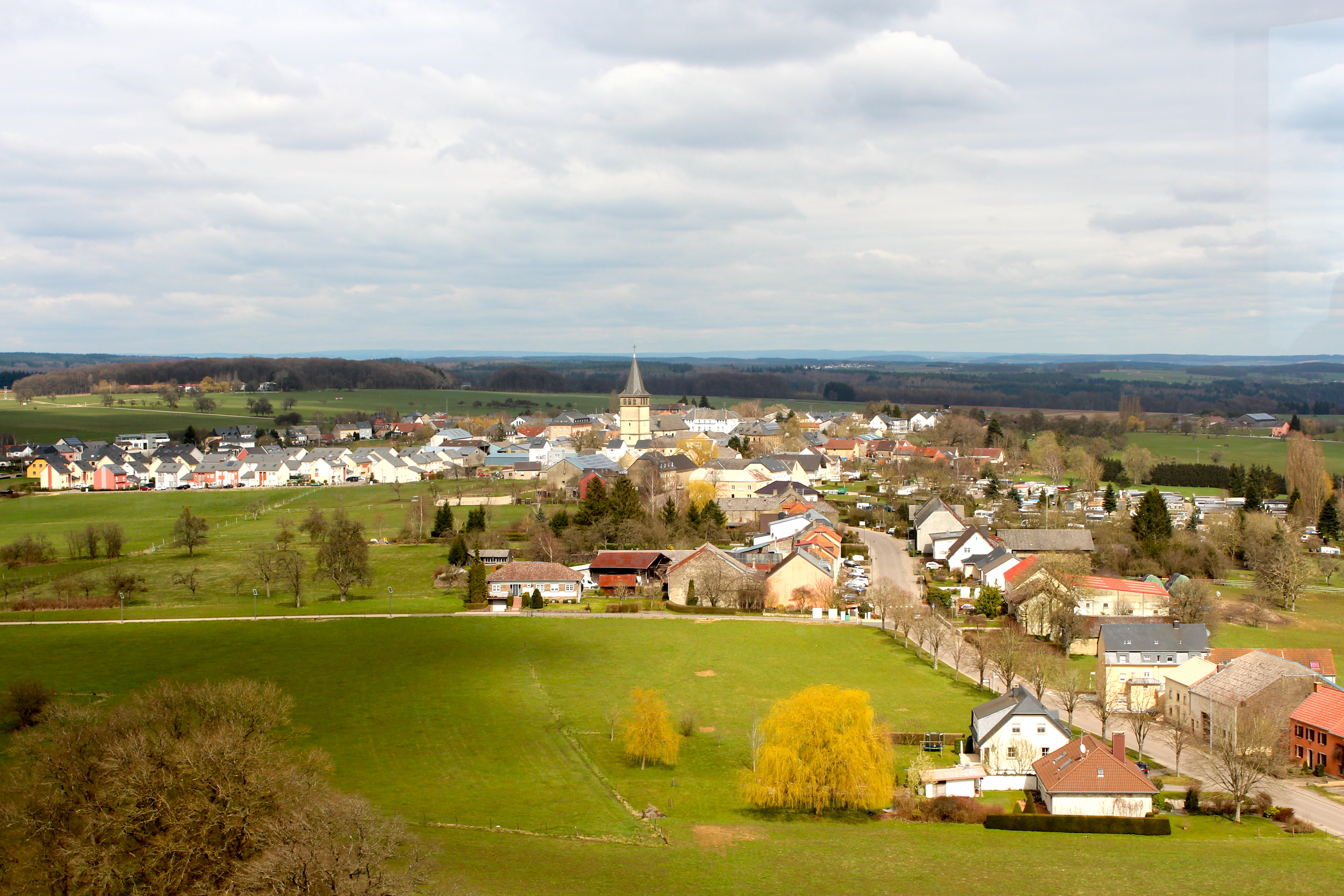

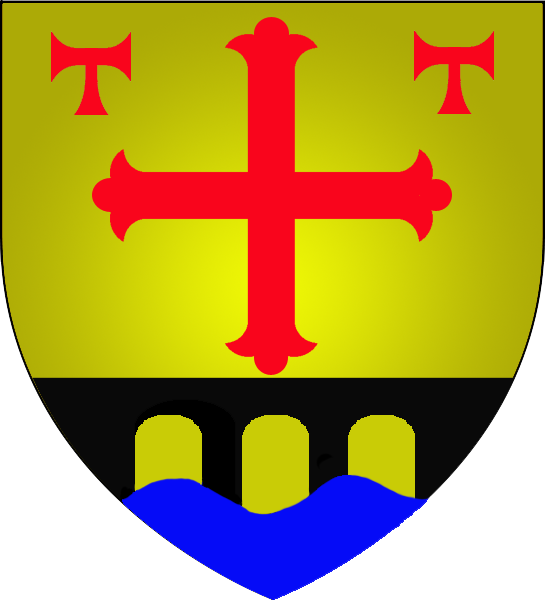
- Coat of arms

- Map of Luxembourg with Berdorf highlighted in orange, and the canton in dark red
- Coordinates: 49.8208°N 6.3486°E
- Country: Luxembourg
- Canton: Echternach

Government
  - Mayor: Joé Nilles (Independent)

Area
  - Total: 21.93 km^{2} (8.47 sq mi)
  - Rank: 46th of 100
- Highest elevation: 384 m (1,260 ft)
  - Rank: 65th of 100
- Lowest elevation: 165 m (541 ft)
  - Rank: 10th of 100

Population (2025)
  - Total: 2,235
  - Rank: 75th of 100
  - Density: 101.9/km^{2} (264.0/sq mi)
  - Rank: 67th of 100
- Time zone: UTC+1 (CET)
  - Summer (DST): UTC+2 (CEST)
- LAU 2: LU0001003
- Website: www.berdorf.lu

Berdorf (Luxembourgish: Bäerdref) is a commune and small town in eastern Luxembourg. It is part of the canton of Echternach, which is part of the district of Grevenmacher. Berdorf is known for the sandstone rocks surrounding it.

As of September 2026, the town of Berdorf, which lies in the centre of the commune, has a population of 1,511. Other towns within the commune include Bollendorf-Pont, Grundhof, and Weilerbach.

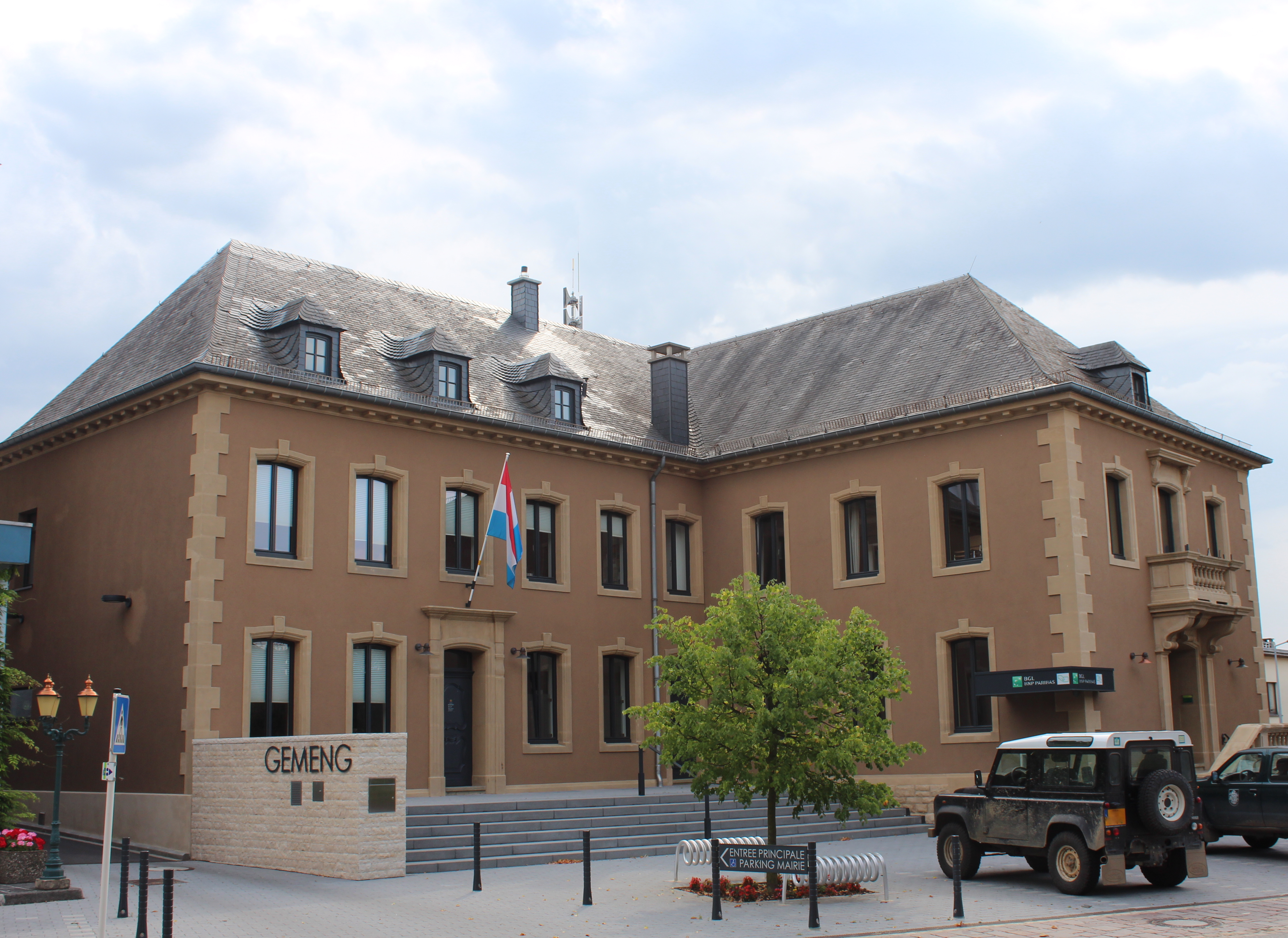
Berdorf town hall

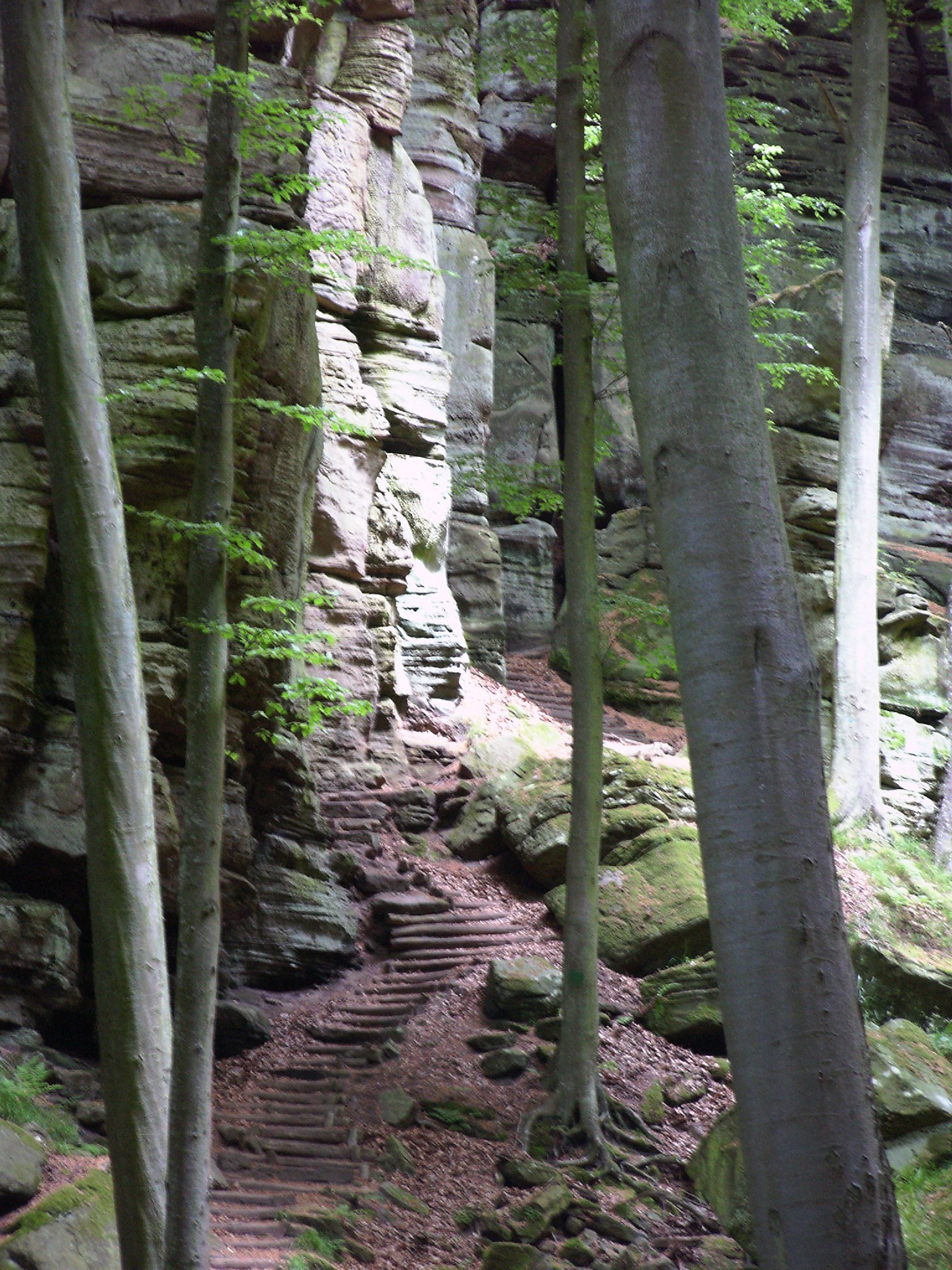
Sandstone Rocks

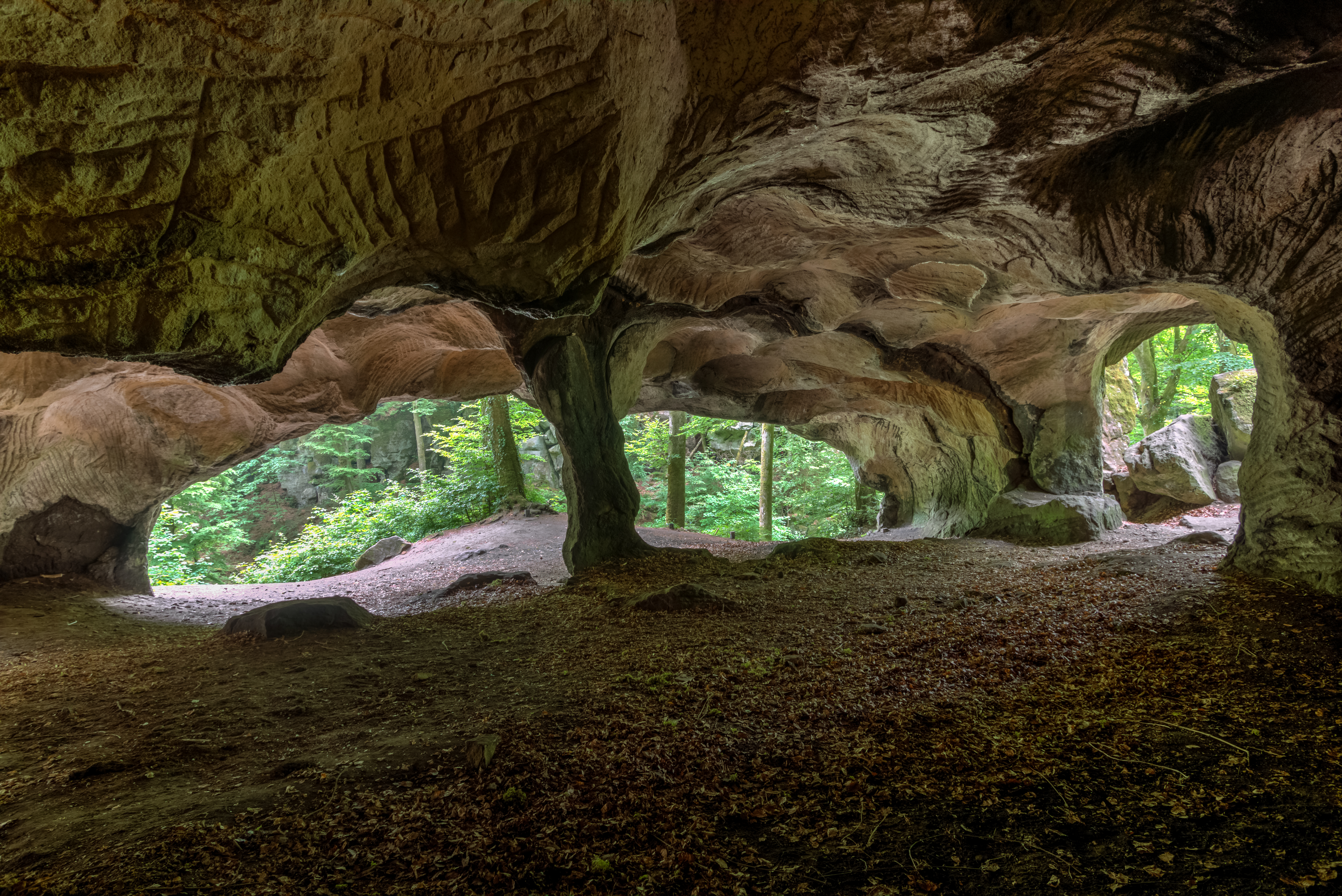
Hohllay ("hollow rock")

== Population ==
Historical population

Year	Pop.	±%
1821	580	—
1851	967	+66.7%
1900	804	−16.9%
1910	924	+14.9%
1922	951	+2.9%
1935	890	−6.4%

Year	Pop.	±%
1947	841	−5.5%
1960	839	−0.2%
1970	831	−1.0%
1981	852	+2.5%
1990	876	+2.8%
2000	1,165	+33.0%

Year	Pop.	±%
2005	1,534	+31.7%
2010	1,600	+4.3%
2015	1,826	+14.1%
2020	1,868	+2.3%
2021	1,951	+4.4%

Source data
