= Nommern =

Nommern Noumer
- Commune
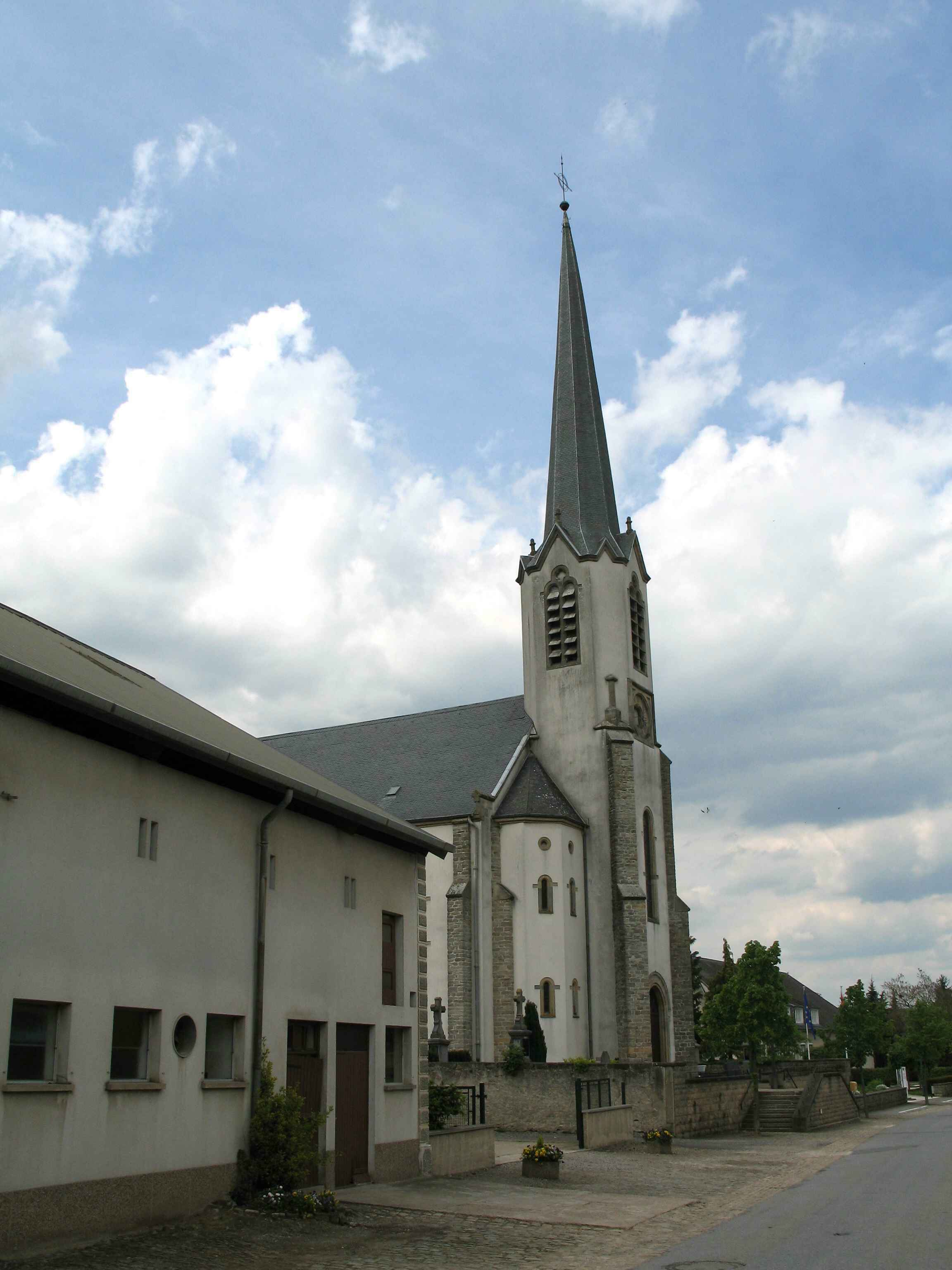
- The church

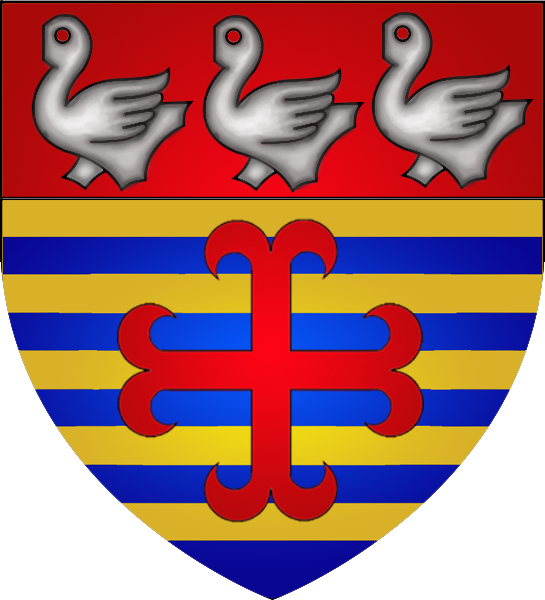
- Coat of arms

- Map of Luxembourg with Nommern highlighted in orange, and the canton in dark red
- Coordinates: 49.794167°N 6.173611°E
- Country: Luxembourg
- Canton: Mersch

Government
  - Mayor: Sophie Didderich

Area
  - Total: 22.44 km^{2} (8.66 sq mi)
  - Rank: 44th of 100
- Highest elevation: 417 m (1,368 ft)
  - Rank: 38th of 100
- Lowest elevation: 296 m (971 ft)
  - Rank: 92nd of 100

Population (2026)
  - Total: 1,506
  - Rank: 93th of 100
  - Density: 67.11/km^{2} (173.8/sq mi)
  - Rank: 85th of 100
- Time zone: UTC+1 (CET)
  - Summer (DST): UTC+2 (CEST)
- LAU 2: LU0000410
- Website: nommern.lu

Nommern (German pronunciation: [ˈnɔmɐn]; Luxembourgish: Noumer) is a commune and small town in central Luxembourg, in the canton of Mersch.

As of September 2026, the town of Nommern, which lies in the east of the commune, has a population of 317. Other towns within the commune include Cruchten and Schrondweiler.

A proposal to merge the commune with Larochette and Fischbach into a new commune named Meesebuerg was put to a referendum in November 2014. Although 66.5% of voters in Larochette were in favour of the merger, 76% and 70% of those in Fischbach and Nommern respectively were against, leading to the abandonment of the project.

== Population ==
Historical population

Year	Pop.	±%
1821	758	—
1851	1,002	+32.2%
1900	873	−12.9%
1910	846	−3.1%
1922	787	−7.0%
1935	707	−10.2%

Year	Pop.	±%
1947	723	+2.3%
1960	600	−17.0%
1970	620	+3.3%
1981	663	+6.9%
1990	792	+19.5%
2000	947	+19.6%

Year	Pop.	±%
2005	1,003	+5.9%
2010	1,142	+13.9%
2015	1,313	+15.0%
2020	1,401	+6.7%
2021	1,439	+2.7%

Source data
