= White Ernz =

River in Luxembourg

Coordinates: 49.86021°N 6.24652°E

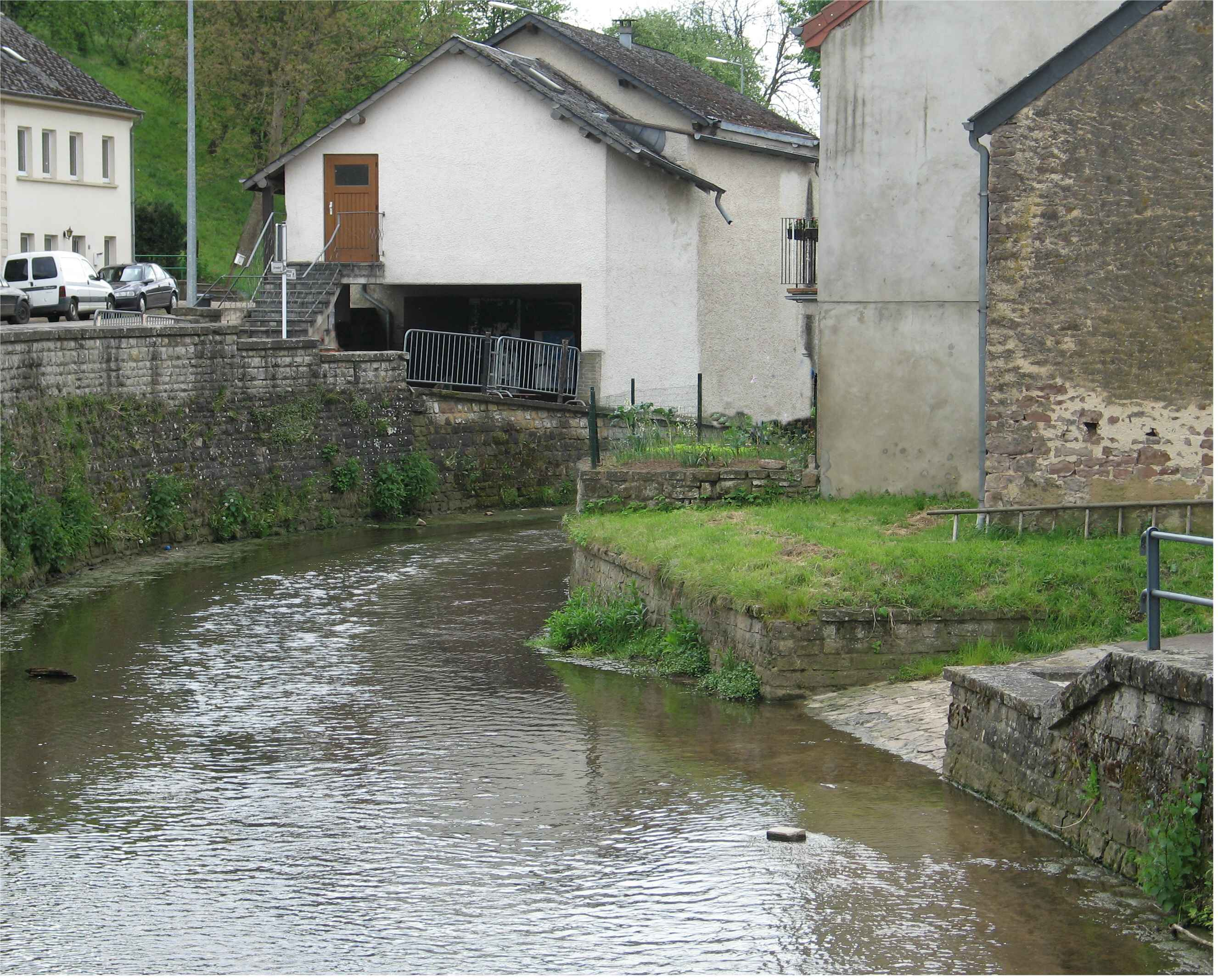

Location
- Country: Luxembourg

Physical characteristics
- Source
  - location: Grünewald
- Mouth
  - location: Sauer River, at Reisdorf
- Length: 30 km (19 mi)

The White Ernz (Luxembourgish: Wäiss Iernz, French: Ernz blanche, German: Weiße Ernz) is a river flowing through Luxembourg, joining the Sauer at Reisdorf. It flows through the towns of Larochette, Medernach and Ermsdorf. The river valley also includes the notable feature of having a twin castle from the 14th century named Larochette Castle. It gives its name to the commune of Vallée de l'Ernz, formed in 2012 through the fusion of Medernach and Ermsdorf.
