= Grundhof, Luxembourg =

Coordinates: 49°49′55″N 6°19′47″E

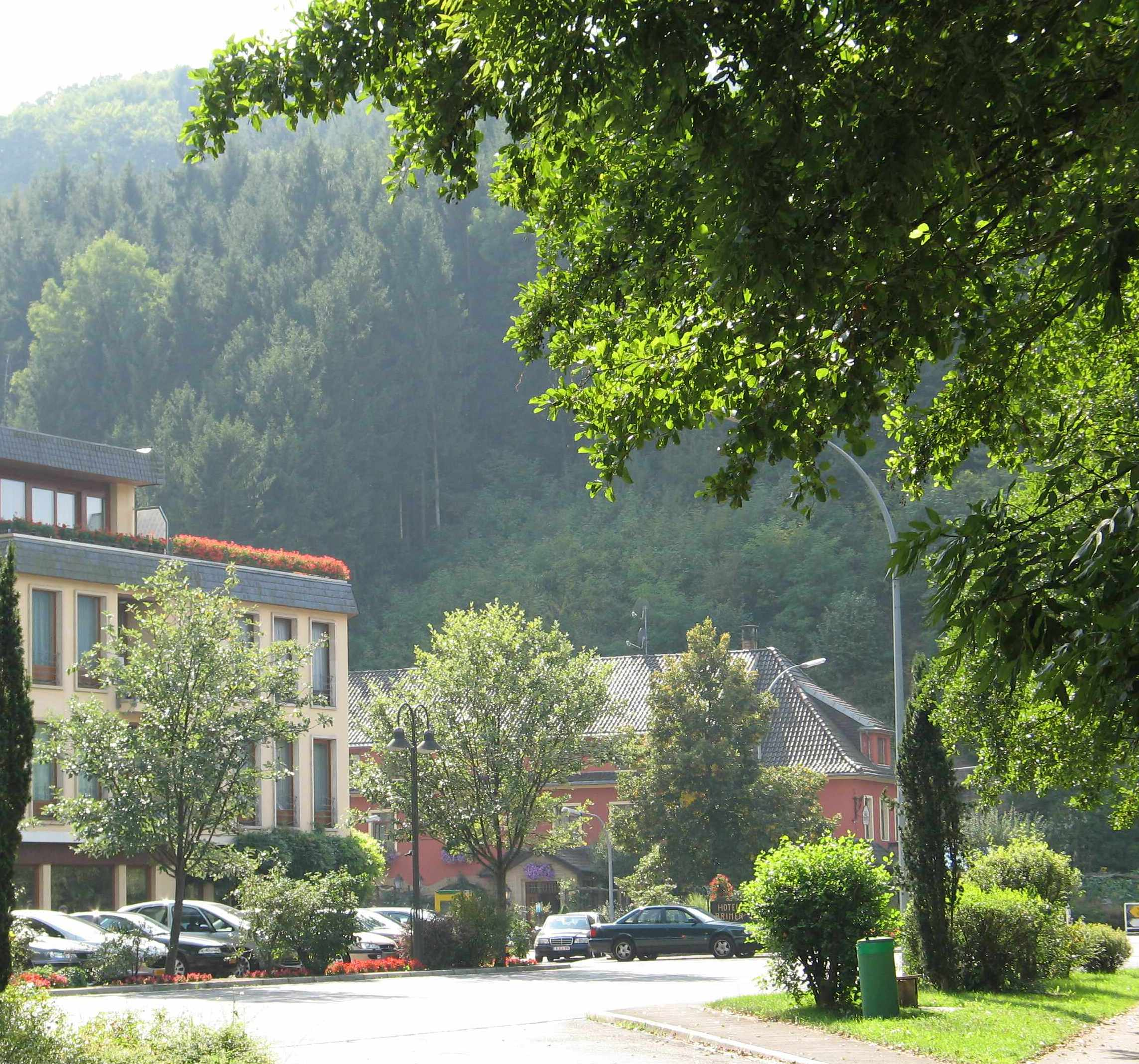
A Place in Grundhof, Luxembourg

Grundhof (German pronunciation: [ˈɡʁʊnthoːf]; Luxembourgish: Grondhaff) is a village in the commune of Berdorf, in eastern Luxembourg. As of September 2026, the village had a population of 24. Nearby is the confluence of the Sauer and the Black Ernz.
