= Ernzen =

Ernzen Lerenz
- Village
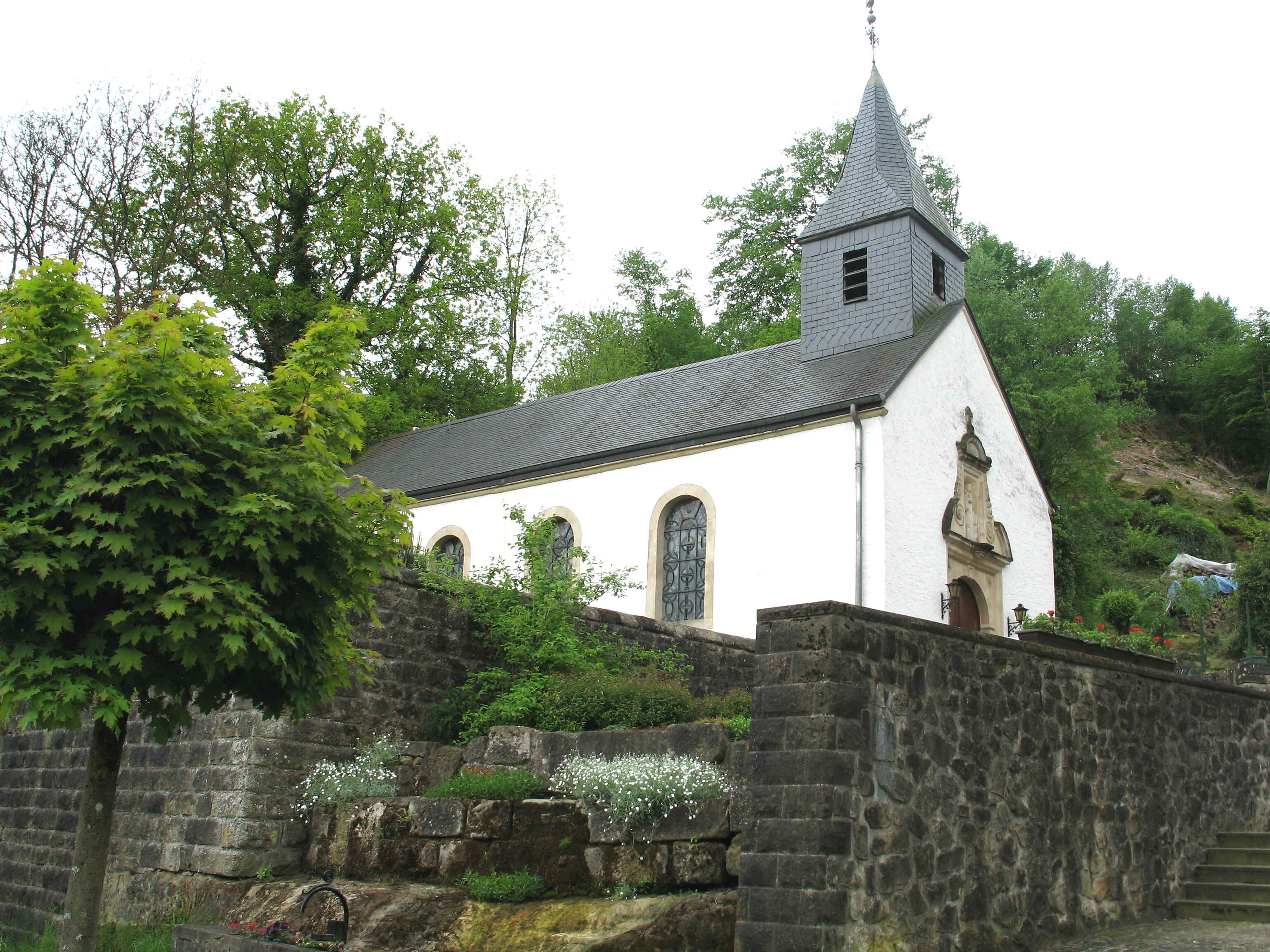
- Ernzen chapel

- Location within Luxembourg
- Coordinates: 49°46′21.2″N 6°13′15.6″E
- Country: Luxembourg
- Region: Mersch
- Commune: Larochette

Population (2024)
  - Total: 540
- Time zone: Central European Time
  - Summer (DST): Central European Summer Time

Ernzen (German pronunciation: [ˈɛʁntsn̩]; Luxembourgish: Iernzen) is a small village in the commune of Larochette, in central Luxembourg.

As of 2026, the town has a population of 555.

In the south of Ernzen are active stone quarries, as well as ponds from former ones.
