= Larochette =

Larochette Fiels
- Commune
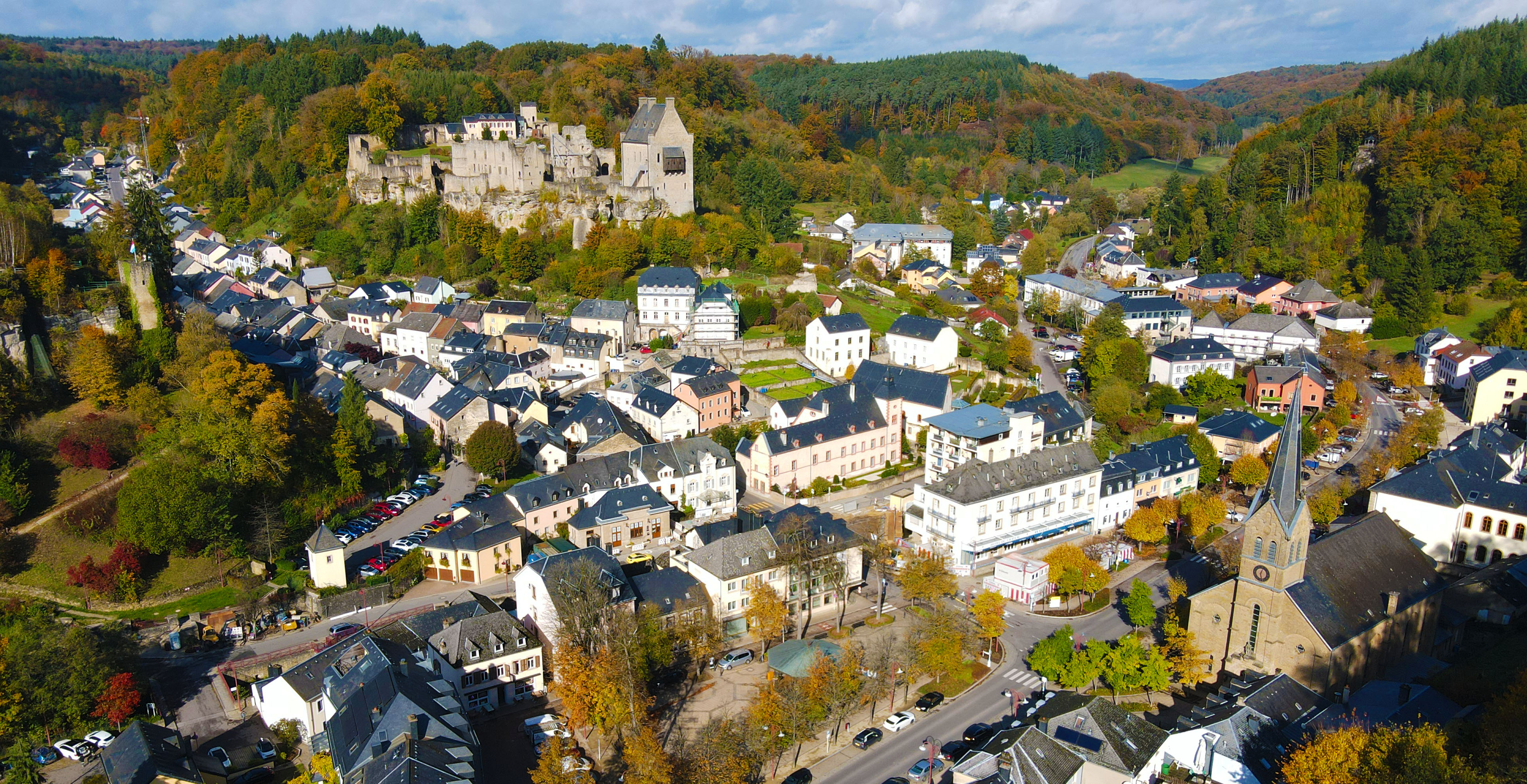

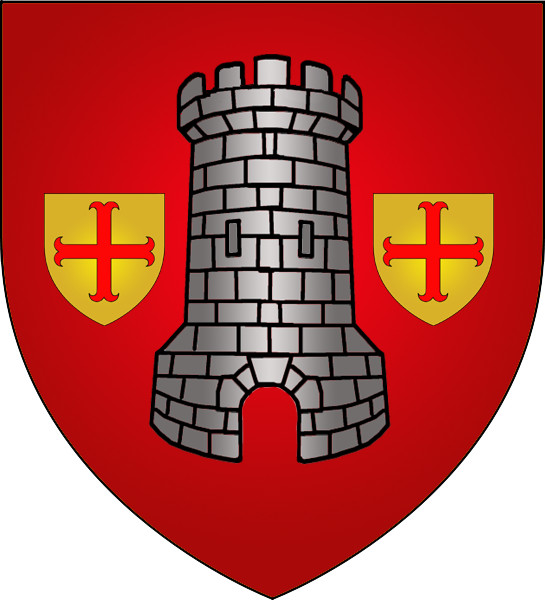
- Coat of arms

- Map of Luxembourg with Larochette highlighted in orange, and the canton in dark red
- Coordinates: 49.783611°N 6.219444°E
- Country: Luxembourg
- Canton: Mersch

Government
  - Mayor: Mirko Martellii

Area
  - Total: 15.4 km^{2} (5.9 sq mi)
  - Rank: 74th of 100
- Highest elevation: 420 m (1,380 ft)
  - Rank: 36th of 100
- Lowest elevation: 266 m (873 ft)
  - Rank: 70th of 100

Population
  - Total: 2,241
  - Rank: 76th of 100
  - Density: 146/km^{2} (377/sq mi)
  - Rank: 56th of 100
- Time zone: UTC+1 (CET)
  - Summer (DST): UTC+2 (CEST)
- LAU 2: LU0000406
- Website: larochette.lu

Larochette (French pronunciation: [laʁɔʃɛt]; Luxembourgish: Fiels, German: Fels) is a commune and town in central Luxembourg, in the canton of Mersch. It is situated on the White Ernz river. The town is dominated by the partly ruined Larochette Castle.

The town of Larochette lies in the north-east of the commune. Other towns within the commune include Ernzen.

Meysembourg Castle, located some 2 kilometres (1 1/4 mi) south-west of Larochette, has a history dating back to the 12th century. Today's castle was built in 1880 in Neo-Renaissance style and is privately owned.

== Geography ==
The settlements of the commune lie in the valley of the White Ernz into which the commune's streams Ousterbur, Manzebaach and Iernzerbaach run. The valley is surrounded by Luxembourg Sandstone and small areas of Steinmergelkeuper.

== History ==
The town of Larochette used to be a small industrial hub. It was specialised in cloth mills on the river White Ernz from the end of the 18th century until the 1930s with some factories being active until the 1980s.

In the street Rue de Medernach was a spinning factory, which became a brush factory from the 1920s to 1986 and is nowadays an apartment complex. At the location of today's primary school and cultural center on the same road used to be an industrial complex with different industrial uses over the years. In the Rue Scheerbach were several textile factories that are now residential buildings, one of the industrial chimneys has been restored. Other remnants can be seen in a museum in a building of the former train station.

Larochette was part of the narrow-gauge railway Larochette - Cruchten that was operational from 1882 to 1948. It was also connected to another narrow-gauge railway that went to the quarries in Ernzen over Heffingen-Soup. The planned connection to Junglinster was never finished. Still visible today are the train station buildings of Larochette, a train depot that is nowadays a petrol station and supermarket, as well as several bridges. Many sections are now part of the national cycle path network.

A proposal to merge the commune with Nommern and Fischbach into a new commune named Meesebuerg was put to a referendum in November 2014. Although 66.5% of voters in Larochette were in favour of the merger, 76% and 70% of those in Fischbach and Nommern respectively were against, leading to the abandonment of the project.

== Population ==
Larochette has the highest proportion of Portuguese-born inhabitants of any commune in Luxembourg, at 31.1% as of the 2021 census.

Historical population

Year	Pop.	±%
1821	1,104	—
1851	1,268	+14.9%
1900	1,324	+4.4%
1910	1,245	−6.0%
1922	1,182	−5.1%
1935	1,144	−3.2%

Year	Pop.	±%
1947	1,134	−0.9%
1960	958	−15.5%
1970	1,137	+18.7%
1981	1,280	+12.6%
1990	1,437	+12.3%
2000	1,504	+4.7%

Year	Pop.	±%
2005	1,790	+19.0%
2010	1,969	+10.0%
2015	2,122	+7.8%
2020	2,194	+3.4%
2021	2,220	+1.2%

Source: In 2017, Cape Verdean-born Natalie Silva became mayor of Larochette, becoming the first Lusophone person to lead a Luxembourgish commune.
Source data

== Gallery ==
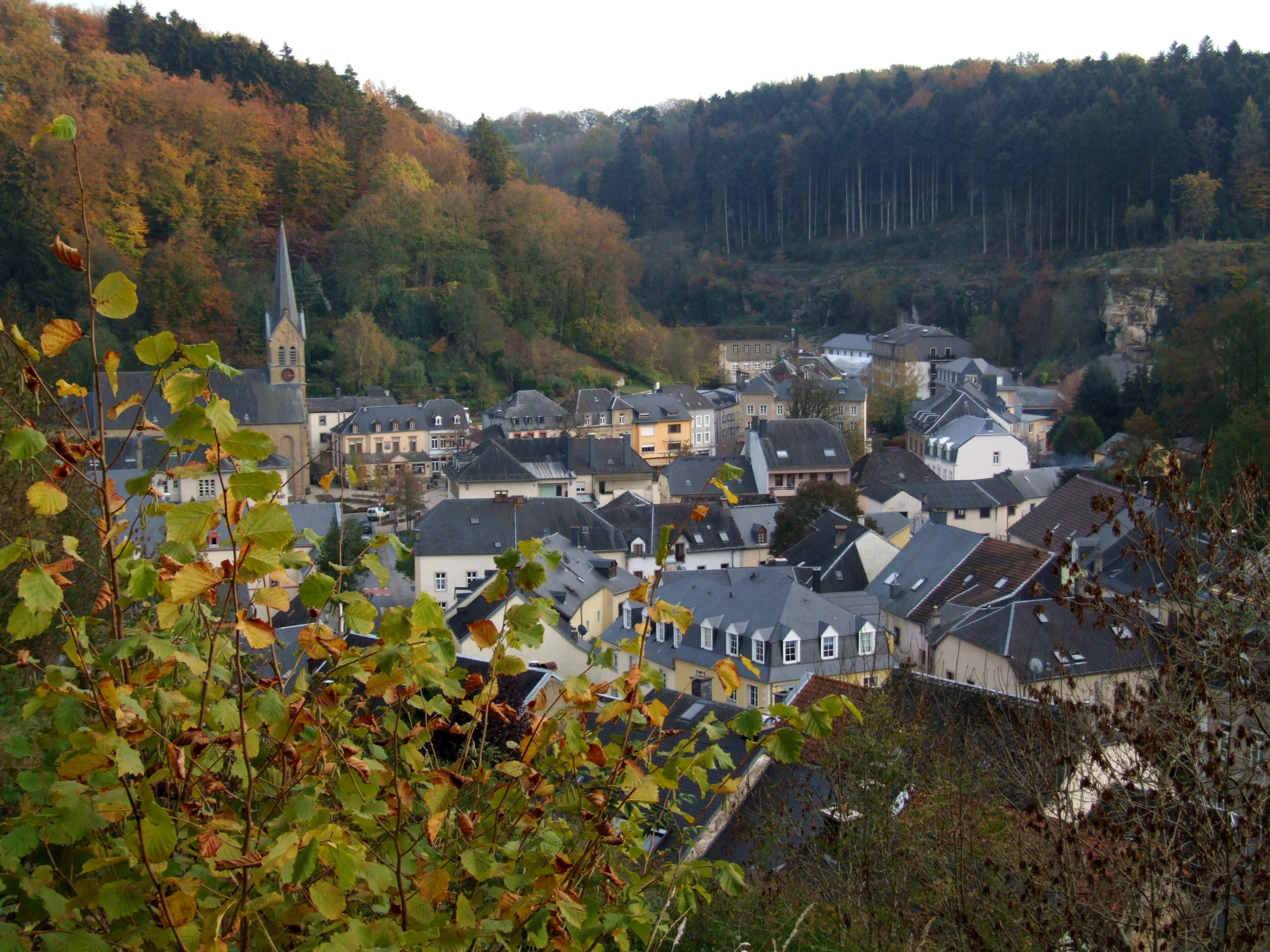

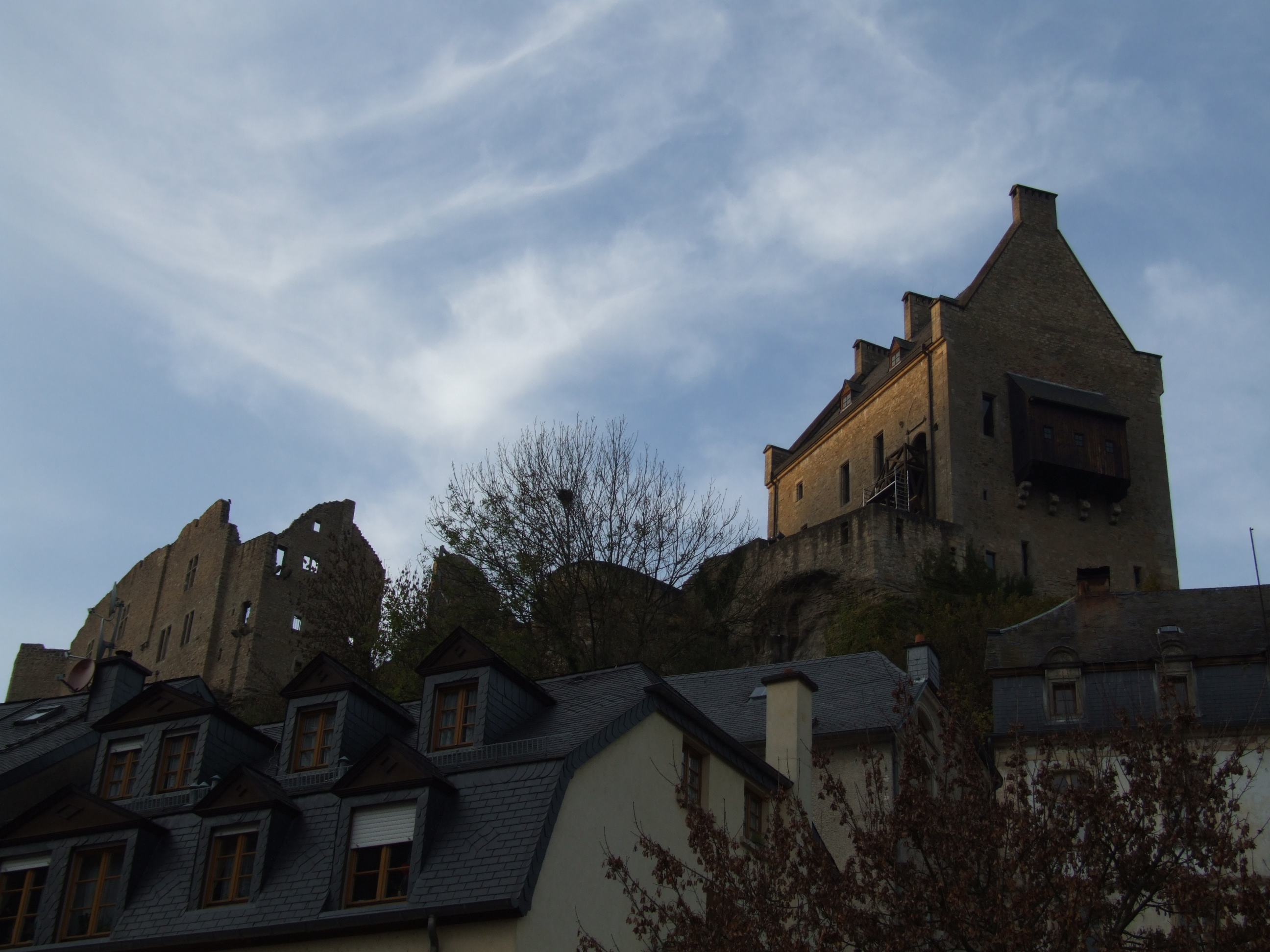

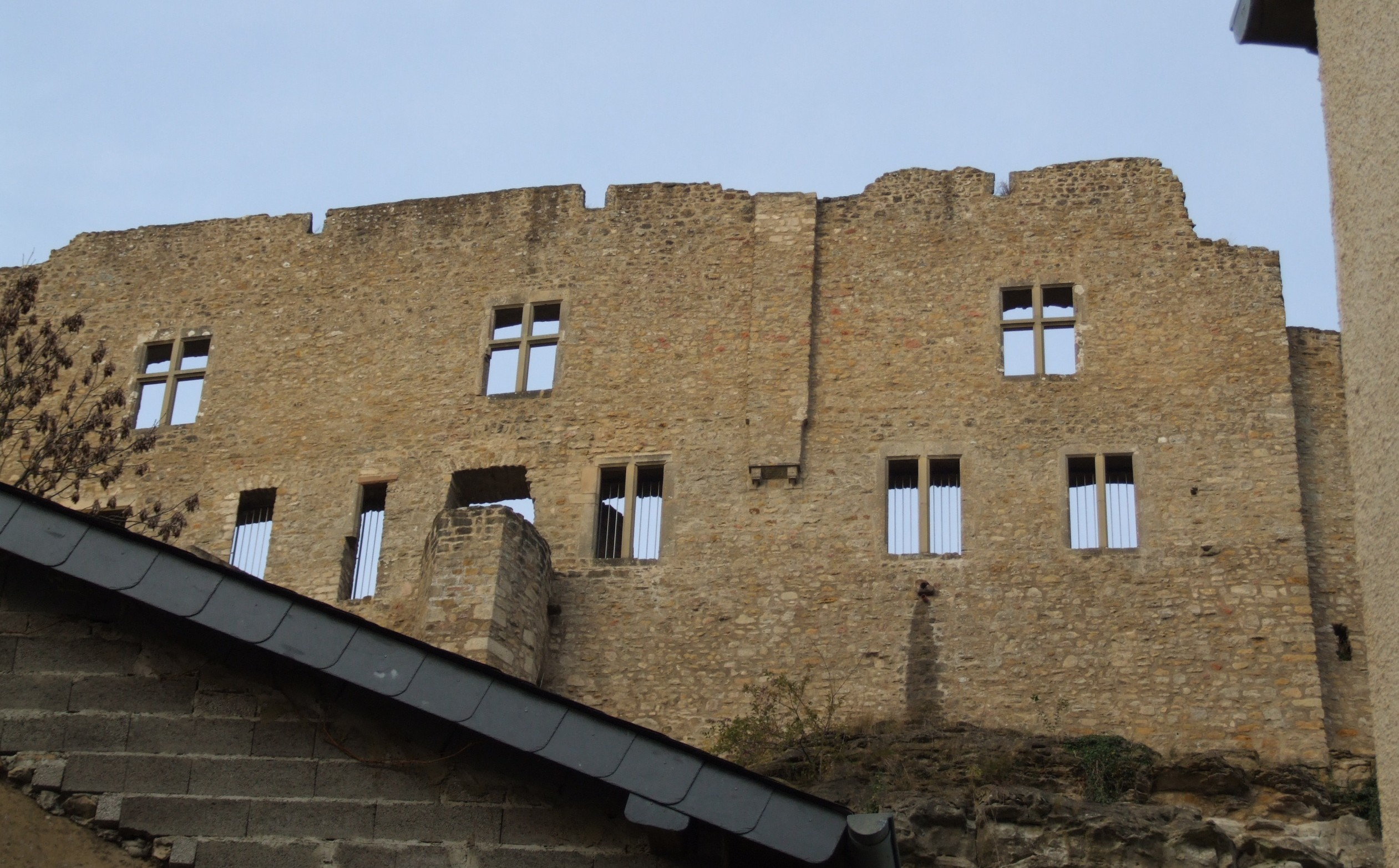

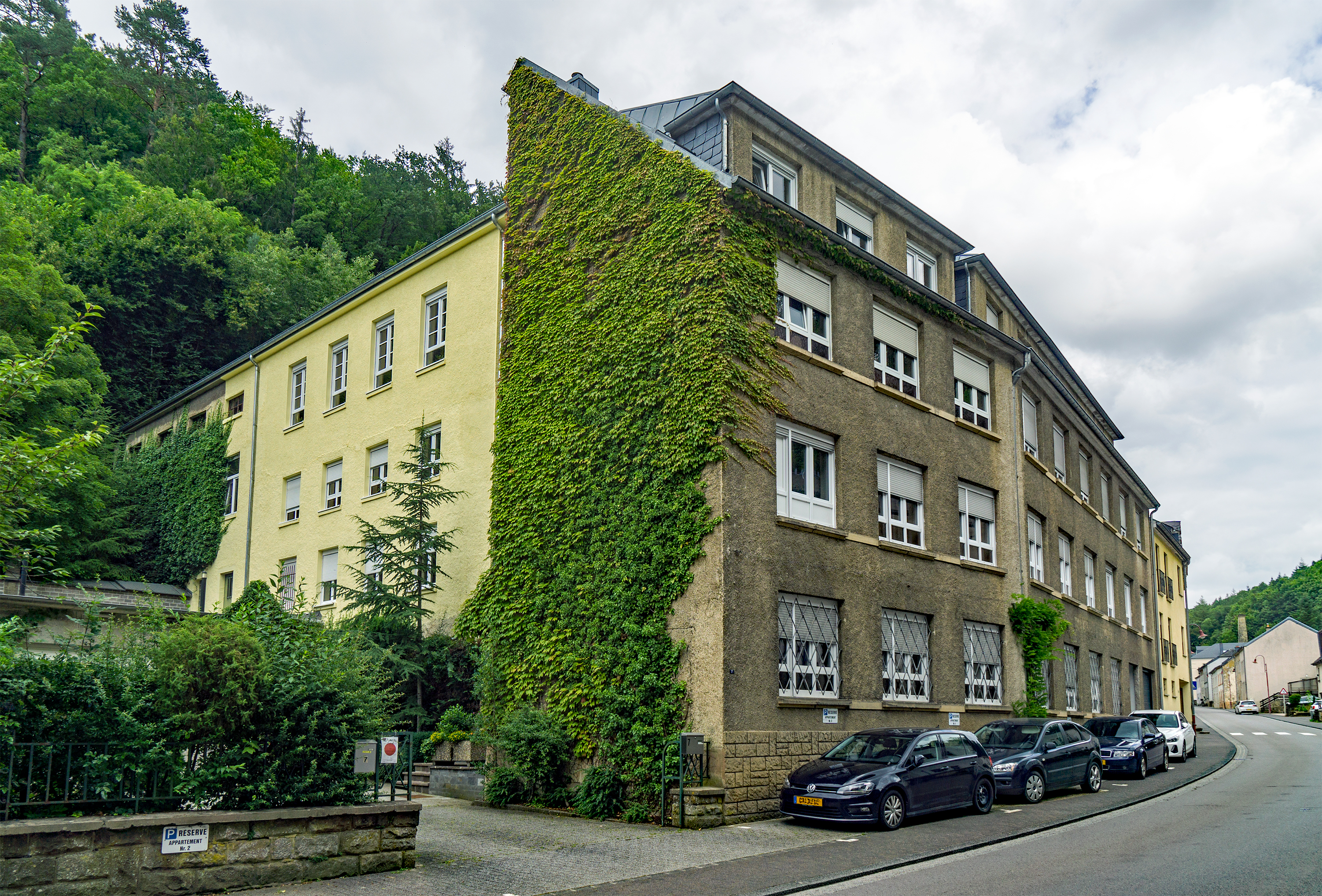

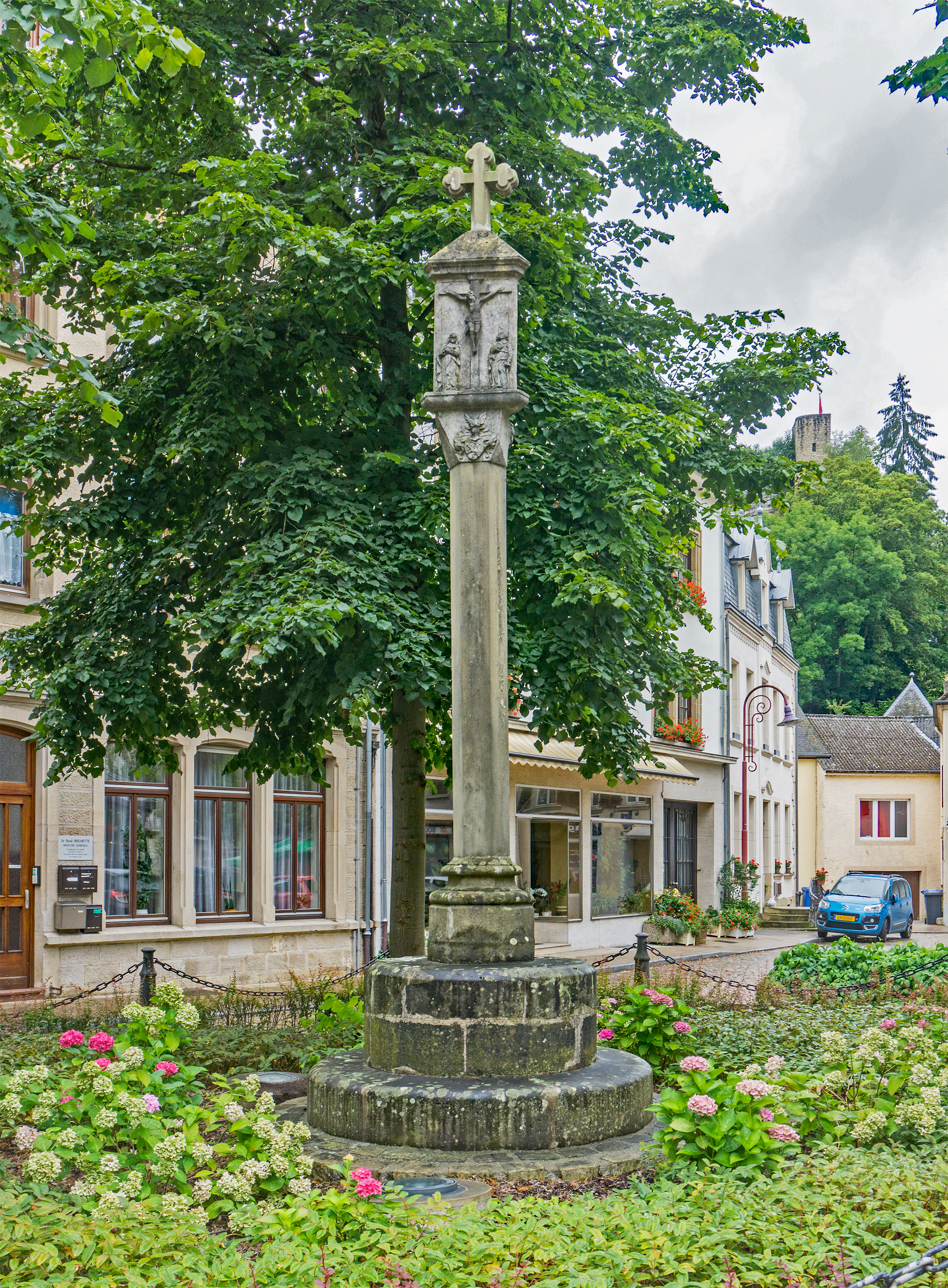

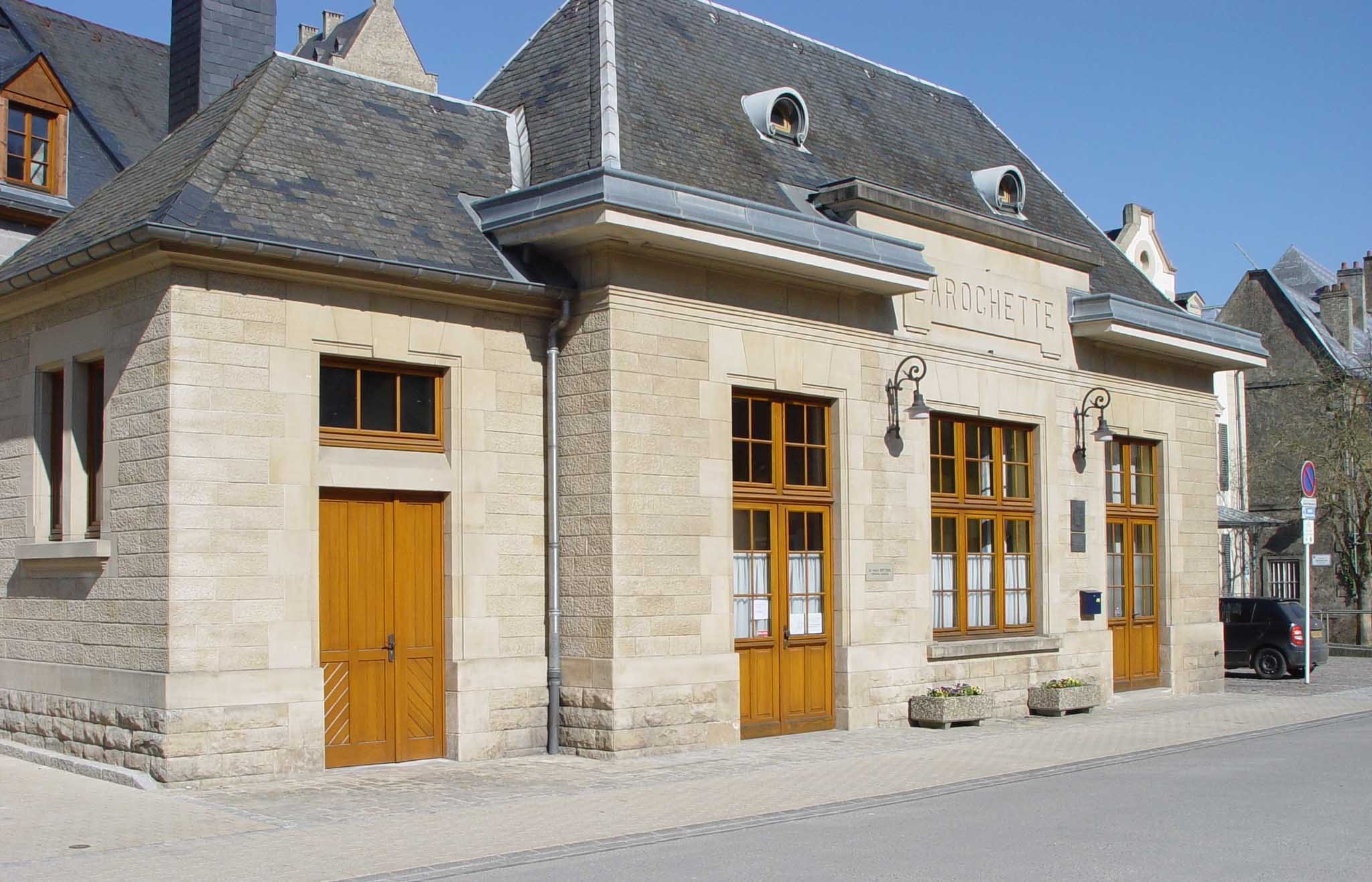

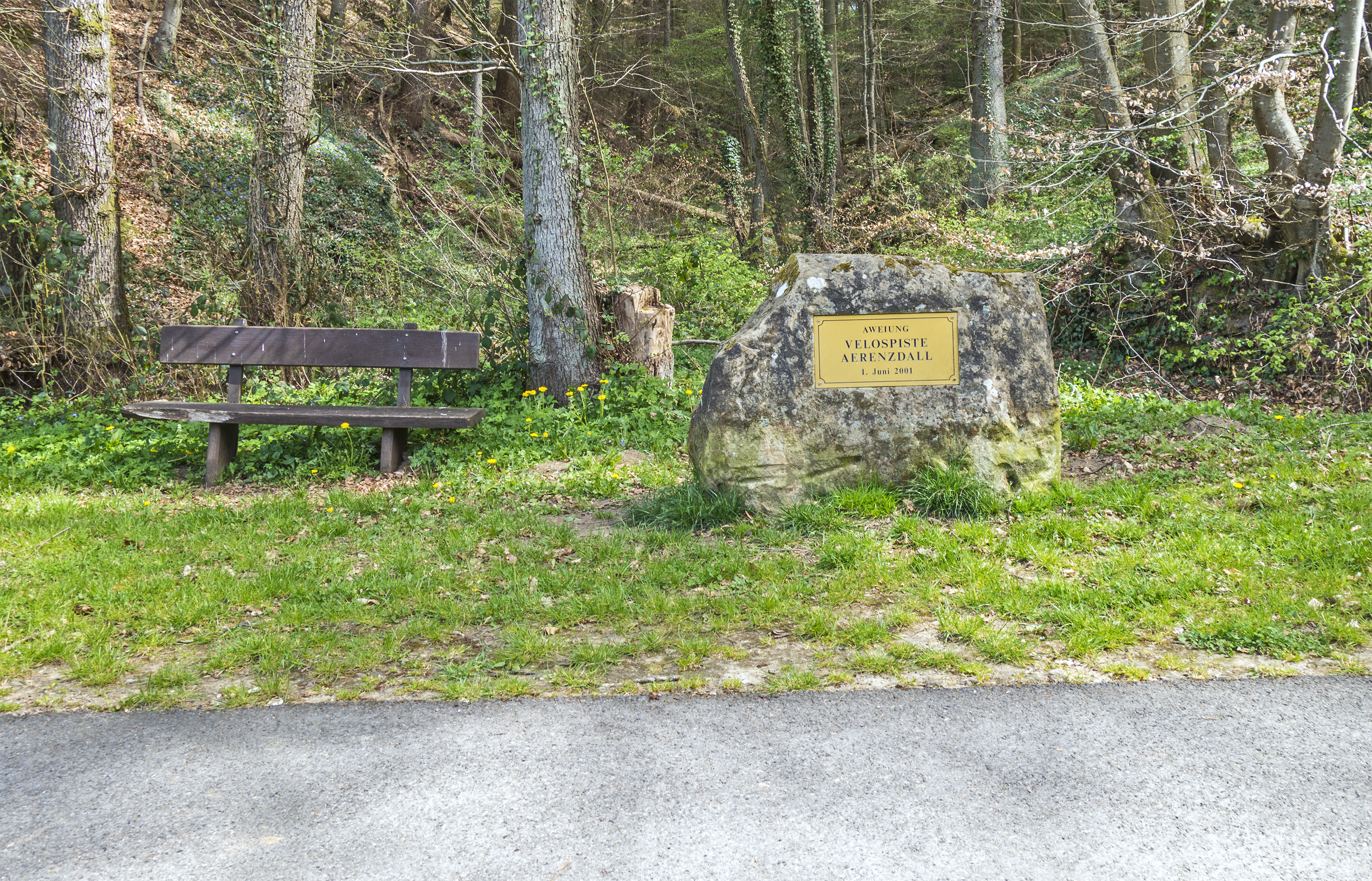
