= Cruchten =

Coordinates: 49°48′N 6°08′E

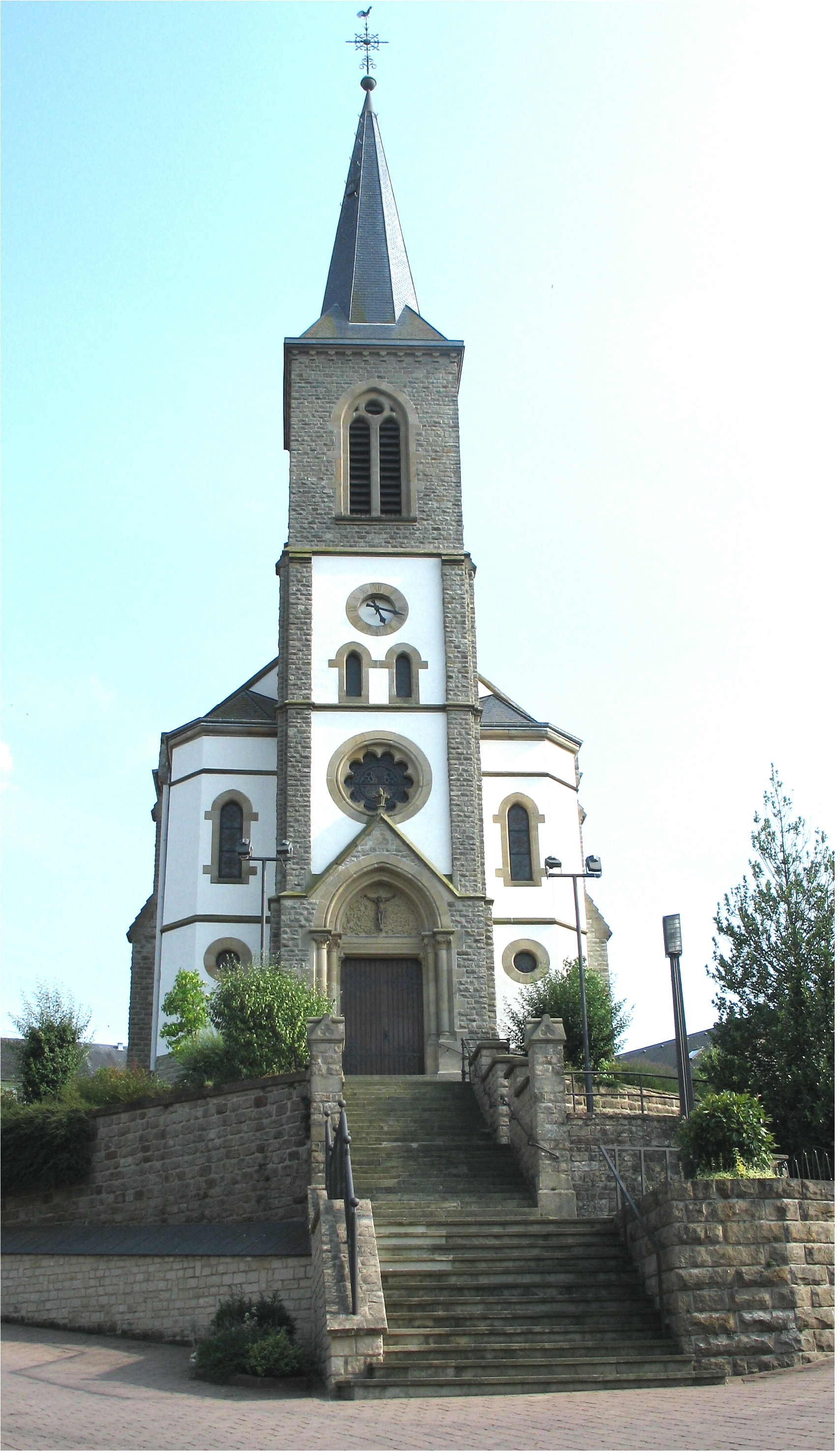
The Saint Bernard church above the fire station.

Cruchten (Luxembourgish: Kruuchten) is a small village in the commune of Nommern, in central Luxembourg. As of 2026, the village has a population of 680.

Cruchten is served by a railway station.
