= Nordstad =

Development area in north-central Luxembourg

Close-up map showing the Nordstad as defined by Statec (red line) and the future merged commune of Nordstad (blue)

Major urban areas of Luxembourg: the Nordstad (blue), the Luxembourg City metropolitan area (orange) and its outer ring (yellow), the Red Lands (red)

Nordstad is a development area in north-central Luxembourg, and a colloquial term to refer to the combined urban areas in the region. The name is Luxembourgish for 'northern city', but it remains the title, both formal and informal, of the region in any language.

The idea was coined by Luxembourgish economist Adrien Ries in 1973. The idea of a unified urban area in the north of the country was put forward to decentralise and diversify the economy, and develop a third major urban area, along with Luxembourg City and the southern Red Lands.

A project of four of the Nordstad's core communes - Ettelbruck, Diekirch, Erpeldange-sur-Sûre and Schieren - to merge into a single municipality has been ongoing since 2018. The project initially also included the communes of Colmar-Berg and Bettendorf, but their communal councils chose to leave negotiations in November 2018 and October 2024, respectively. A non-binding referendum in Bettendorf on rejoining the merger project on 23 March 2025 resulted in a majority for enjoining the merger, after which the communal council had a “working meeting” with the other communes. Another referendum is scheduled for 2027 across the remaining communes, with a stated goal of completing the merger before the 2029 communal elections.

As of 2025, the four communes have a combined population of 22,204 - were the merger to take place, the commune of Nordstad would become the fourth-most populous in the country, and the number of communes in Luxembourg would drop to 97, the lowest since the creation of the municipal system in Luxembourg in 1843.

== Extent ==
Nordstad includes a total of fifteen communes, predominantly in the canton of Diekirch, but also including communes in Mersch and Vianden.

The fifteen communes are:

- Diekirch canton: Bettendorf, Bourscheid, Diekirch, Ermsdorf, Erpeldange, Ettelbruck, Feulen, Medernach, Mertzig, Reisdorf, and Schieren.
- Mersch canton: Bissen, Colmar-Berg, and Nommern.
- Vianden canton: Tandel.

Altogether, the fifteen communes have a population of 33,233, or approximately 7% of Luxembourg's total population. This is over an area of 301.8 km², which is 12% of Luxembourg's territory. Thus, the whole Nordstad region is more sparsely populated than Luxembourg as a whole, despite Nordstad's name.

== Core communes ==
Development activity in Nordstad is concentrated on the centre, and most urbanised area, formed by the six core communes of Bettendorf, Colmar-Berg, Diekirch, Erpeldange, Ettelbruck, and Schieren. Except Colmar-Berg, all of them are in Diekirch canton, and lie in the valley of the middle Sauer. Of the six, Diekirch and Ettelbruck have city status and rank within the top twenty most-populated communes in the Grand Duchy.
