= Dillingen =

Dillingen may refer to:

- Dillingen (district), in Bavaria, Germany
  - Counts of Dillingen, whose seat was at Dillingen an der Donau
  - Dillingen an der Donau, capital of the district
- Dillingen, Saarland, in the district of Saarlouis, Germany
- Dillingen, Luxembourg, in the commune of Beaufort, Luxembourg
