= Medernach =

Medernach Miedernach
- Former commune
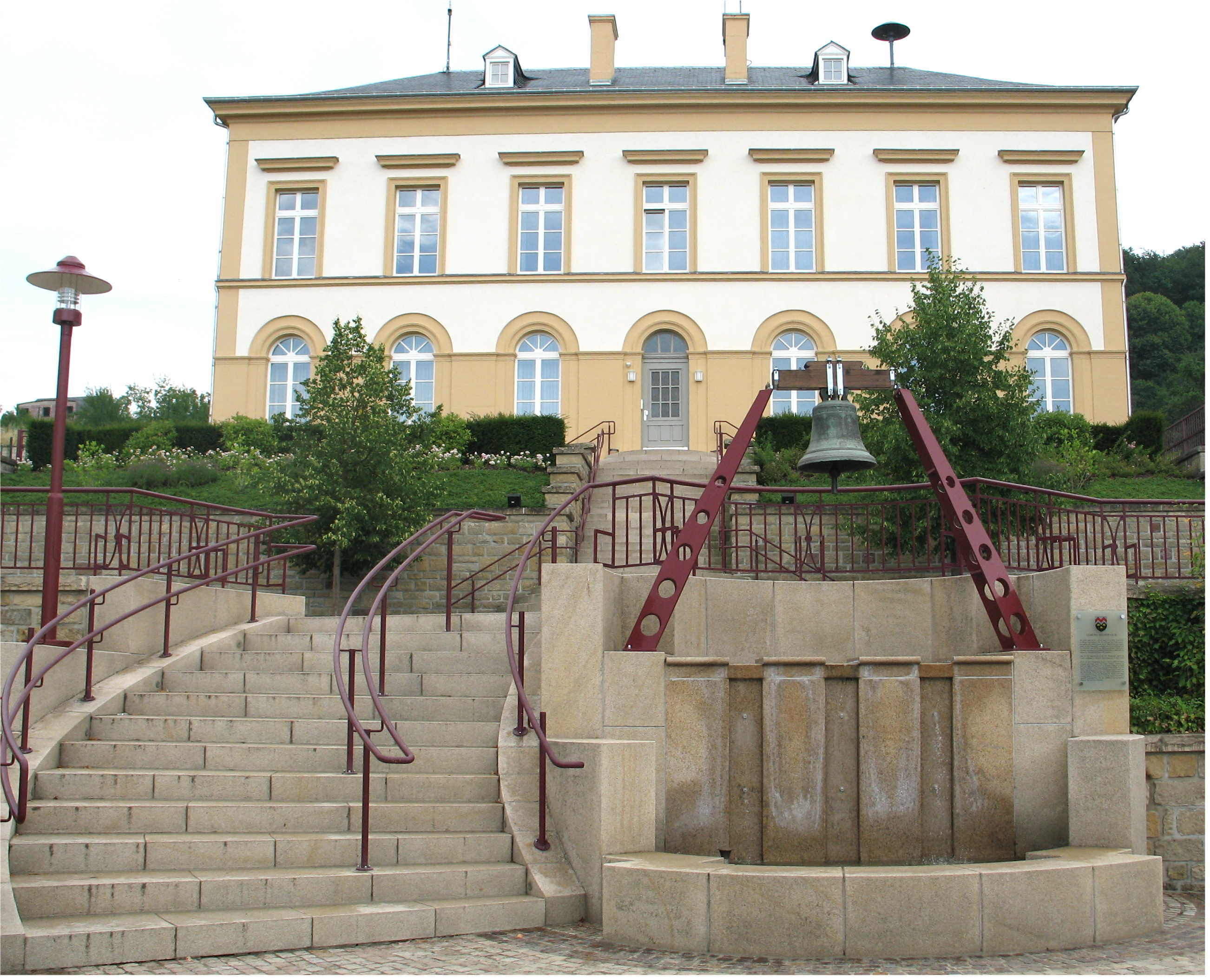

- Coat of arms

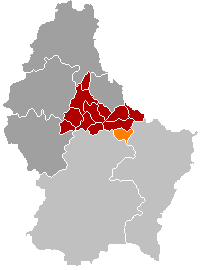
- Coordinates: 49.81°N 6.215°E
- Country: Luxembourg
- District: Diekirch
- Canton: Diekirch
- Commune: Vallée de l'Ernz

Population
  - Total: 1,455

Medernach (Luxembourgish: Miedernach) is a town and former commune in eastern Luxembourg. It is situated in the canton of Diekirch. As of September 2026, the town has a population of 1511.

In 2011, Medernach merged with Ermsdorf to form the commune of Vallée de l'Ernz.

== Former commune ==
The former commune consisted of the villages:

- Medernach
- Marxberg
- Ousterbur
- Pletschette
- Savelborn (Note: Part of the farm belongs to the commune of Waldbillig.)
- Kitzebur

== Attractions ==
From 1987-2015 Medernach was home to an aerodrome (49.78890°N 6.24101°E)

There is a monument commemorating the defense of the town by American soldiers during the winter of 1944–1945 (49.80647°N 6.21357°E).

The parish church, built in a neo-Romanesque style in 1806, has been a national monument since 2004. It houses the Baroque altar from the (now defunct) church of the Franciscan friars of Diekirch, dated 1712, as well as a series of the Stations of the Cross.

Every year, the local produce exhibition is the first weekend of September.
