= Beaufort, Luxembourg =

Beaufort Beefort (Luxembourgish) Befort (German)
- Commune
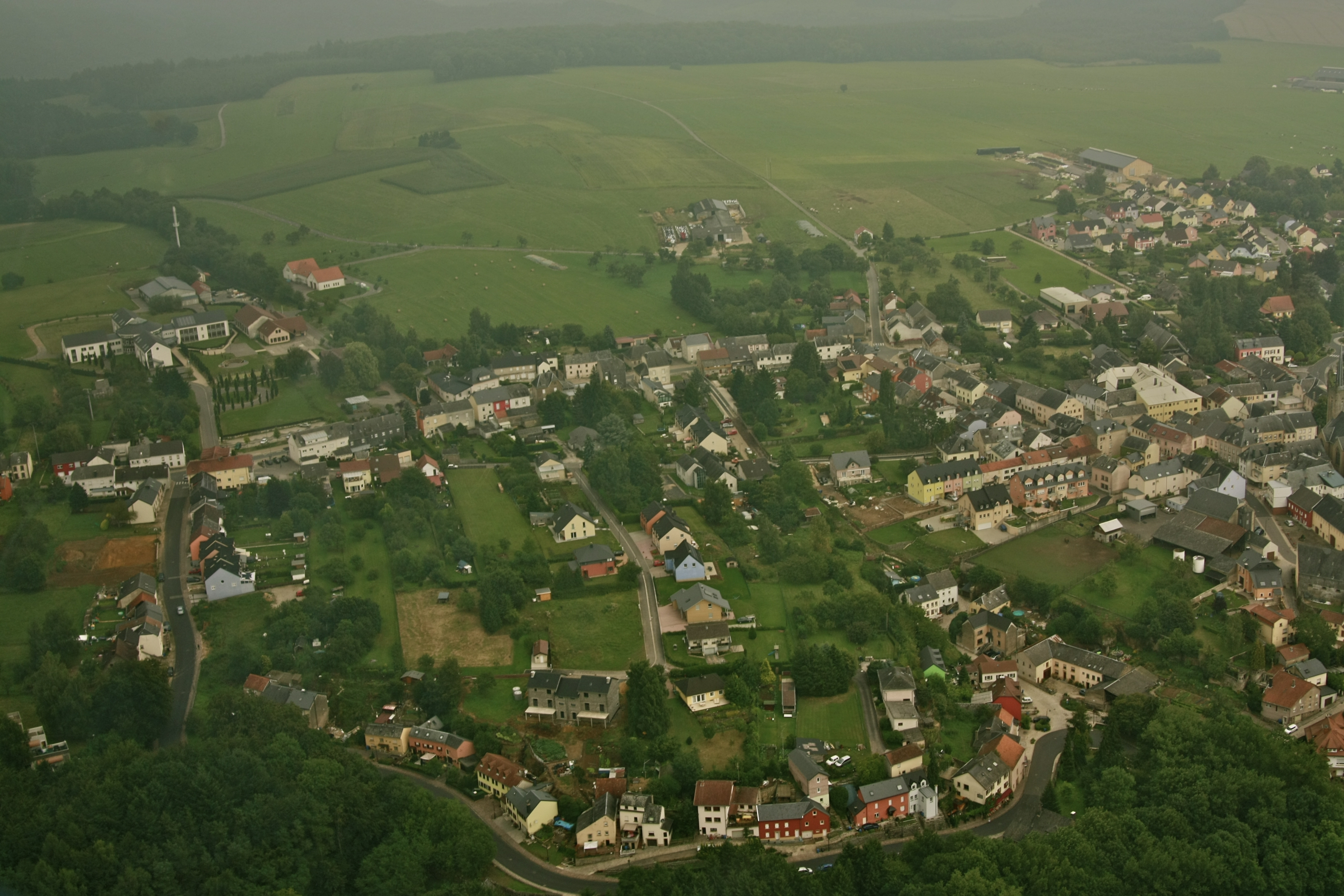

- Coat of arms

- Map of Luxembourg with Beaufort highlighted in orange, and the canton in dark red
- Coordinates: 49.8333°N 6.2833°E
- Country: Luxembourg
- Canton: Echternach

Government
  - Mayor: Jean-Luc Nosbusch (Independent)

Area
  - Total: 13.74 km^{2} (5.31 sq mi)
  - Rank: 82nd of 100
- Highest elevation: 414 m (1,358 ft)
  - Rank: 39th of 100
- Lowest elevation: 173 m (568 ft)
  - Rank: 14th of 100

Population (2025)
  - Total: 3,124
  - Rank: 57th of 100
  - Density: 227.4/km^{2} (588.9/sq mi)
  - Rank: 38th of 100
- Time zone: UTC+1 (CET)
  - Summer (DST): UTC+2 (CEST)
- LAU 2: LU0001001
- Website: beaufort.lu

Beaufort (French pronunciation: [bofɔʁ]; Luxembourgish: Beefort; German: Befort [ˈbeːfɔʁt]) is a commune and town in eastern Luxembourg. It is part of the canton of Echternach, which is part of the district of Grevenmacher.

As of September 2026, the town of Beaufort, which lies in the centre of the commune, had a population of 2,833. Other towns within the commune include Dillingen.

== Demographics ==
As of 2021, 50.8% of the population are male, and 49.2% are female. People younger than 15 years old make up 18.5% of the population, and people 65 years old or older make up 11.7%.

Historical population

| Year | Pop. | ±% |
|---|---|---|
| 1821 | 1,337 | — |
| 1851 | 1,762 | +31.8% |
| 1871 | 1,514 | −14.1% |
| 1880 | 1,505 | −0.6% |
| 1890 | 1,409 | −6.4% |
| 1900 | 1,358 | −3.6% |
| 1910 | 1,344 | −1.0% |
| 1922 | 1,330 | −1.0% |
| 1930 | 1,196 | −10.1% |

| Year | Pop. | ±% |
|---|---|---|
| 1935 | 1,202 | +0.5% |
| 1947 | 948 | −21.1% |
| 1960 | 802 | −15.4% |
| 1970 | 819 | +2.1% |
| 1981 | 916 | +11.8% |
| 1991 | 1,202 | +31.2% |
| 2001 | 1,551 | +29.0% |
| 2011 | 2,254 | +45.3% |
| 2021 | 3,004 | +33.3% |

Source: STATEC

=== Immigration ===
As of 2021, immigrants make up 40.3% of the total population. 30.0% were born in other countries of the European Union, and 10.3% were born outside of the European Union.

== Castle ==
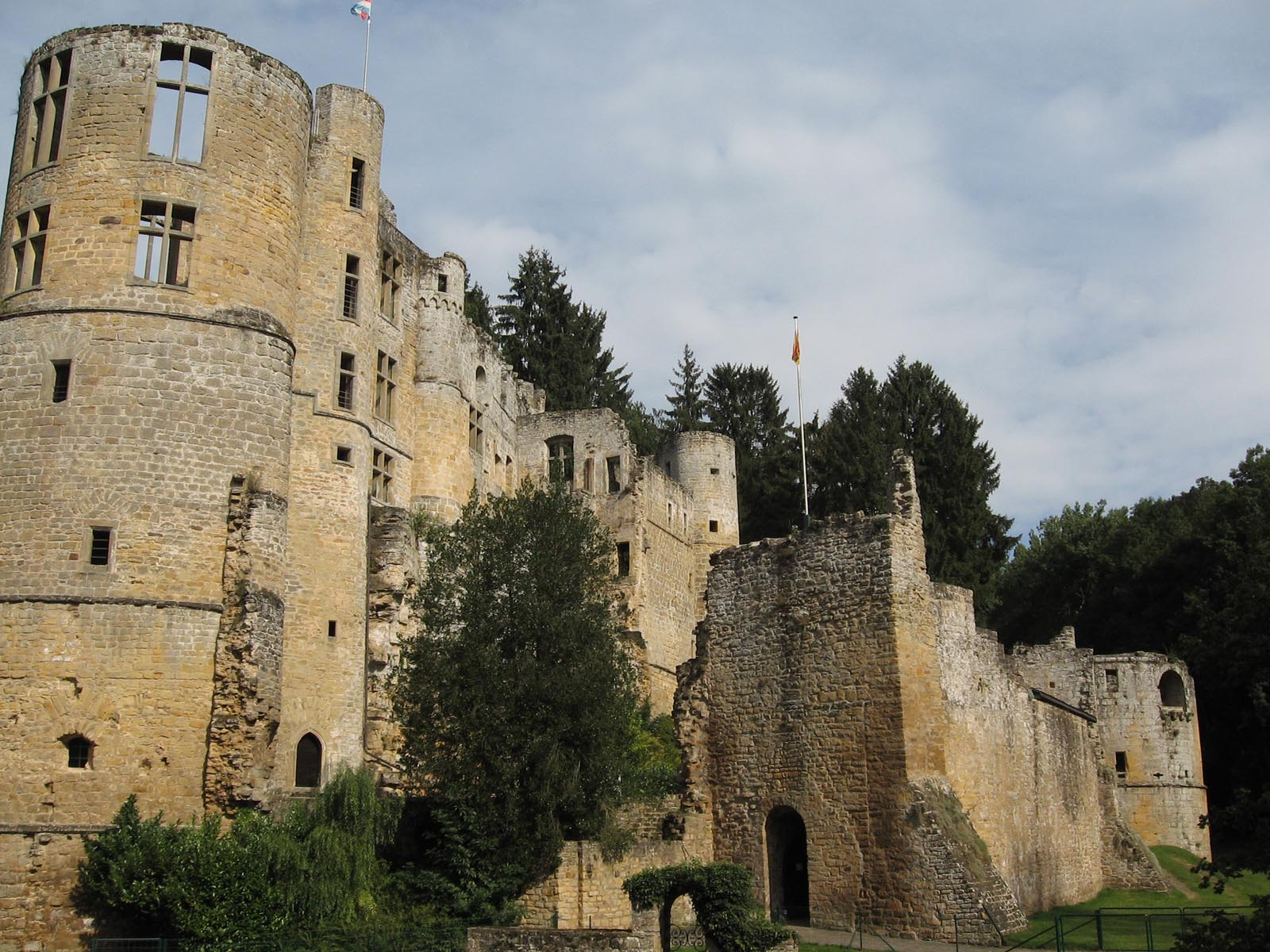
Beaufort castle

The old castle, protected by a moat, was built in four periods. Based on a document of 1192, it is assumed that Walter of Wiltz and Beaufort was the first Lord of Beaufort.

The oldest part of the castle dates from the early 11th century. It was a small square-shaped fortress on a massive rock, surrounded by a wide ditch and a second wall facing the valley. Around the first half of the 12th century, a flanking tower was added and the access gate was moved and enlarged.

The marriage of Adelaide of Beaufort with William of Orley in 1348 meant that the castle became the property of the House of Orley. The lords of Orley expanded the castle towards the valley. The wing containing the well and the upper rooms as well as the lower part of the main tower date from this period. Since 1539 Bernard of Velbrück was Lord of Beaufort.

The House of Beaufort became ruined by the Thirty Year War and thus was forced to sell up. On November 27, 1639, Johann Baron von Beck, governor of the province of Luxembourg on behalf of the Spanish King, acquired the greatest part of its properties. It is likely that he built the wing with the large Renaissance style windows in the main tower and the northwestern cannon tower. After 1643 he ordered the building of the new renaissance chateau. Johann von Beck, however, died of injuries received at the Battle of Lens in 1648 before he could even move in. His son finished the construction in 1649.

The old abandoned knights' castle slowly decayed. At the beginning of the 19th century it was used as a quarry. In 1850 the Luxembourg government declared the castle a cultural heritage.

As of 1893 Beaufort castle acquired a new look under the new owner Henri Even and his son Joseph Linckels. The new palace was restored and the sheep farm was expanded.

In 1928 Edmond Linckels cleared the rubble from the castle and the well and made the site available to the public. Since 1981 the castle and the chateau are owned by the Luxembourg state.

== Gallery ==
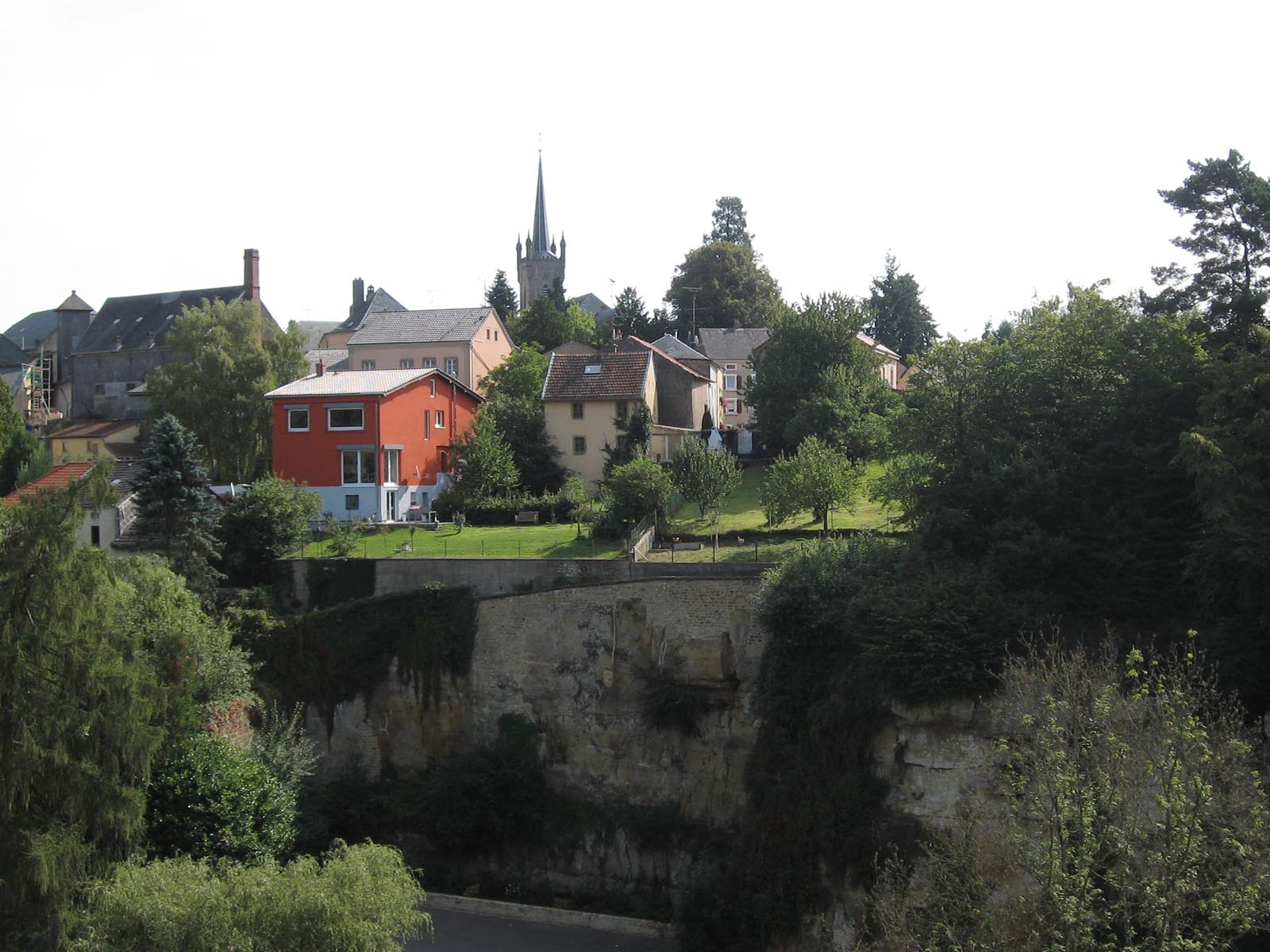
Beaufort

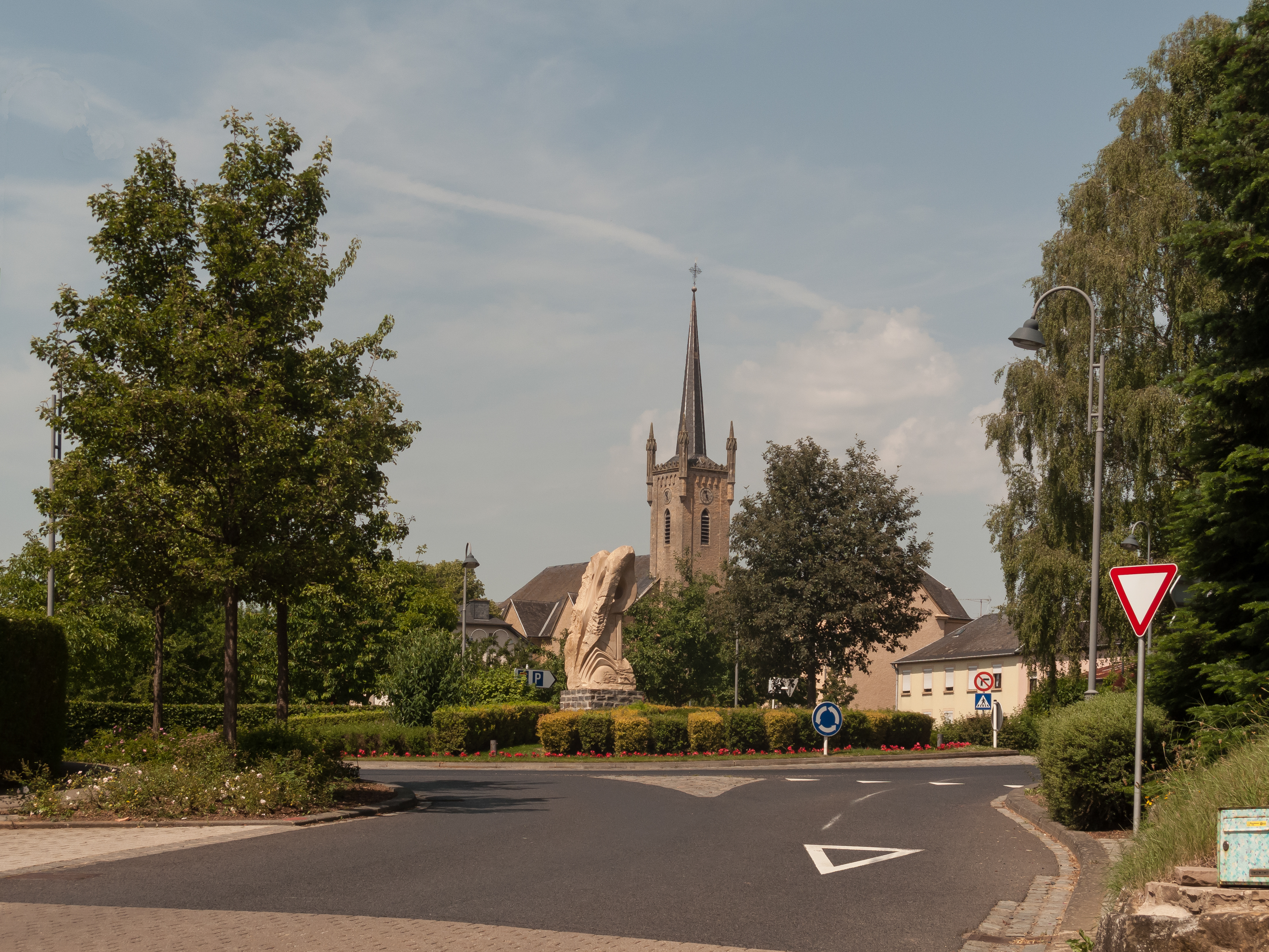
Church (l'église Saint-Michel) in the street

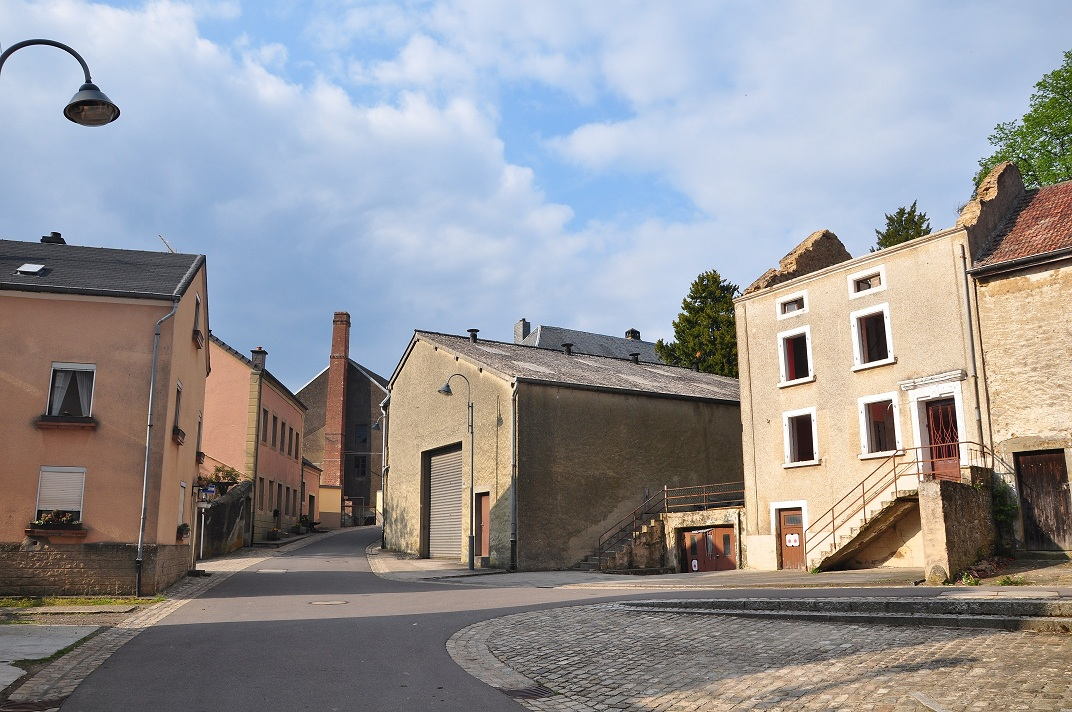
Beaufort town centre

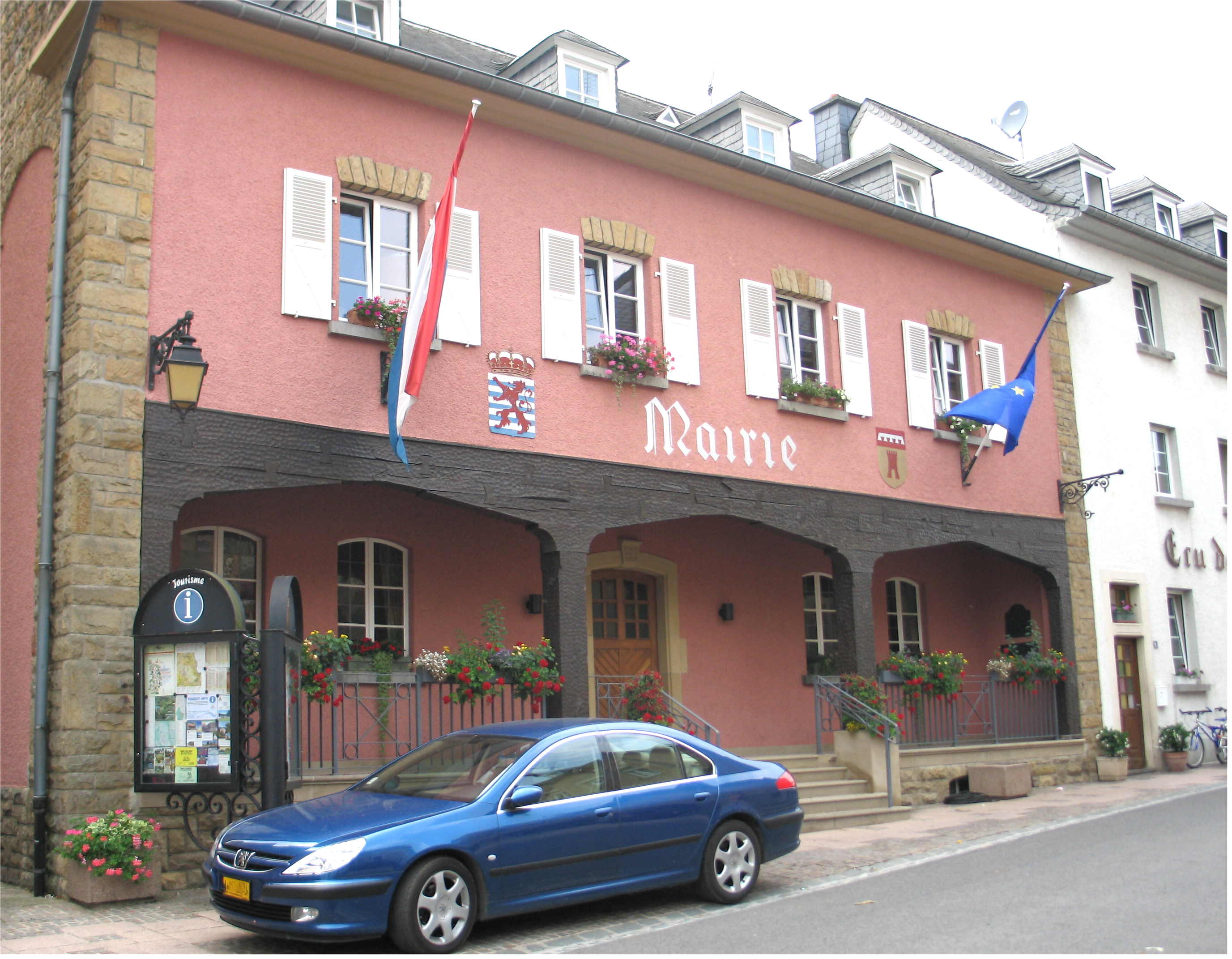
Beaufort town hall
