= Vallée de l'Ernz =

Vallée de l'Ernz Ärenzdallgemeng (Luxembourgish)
- Commune
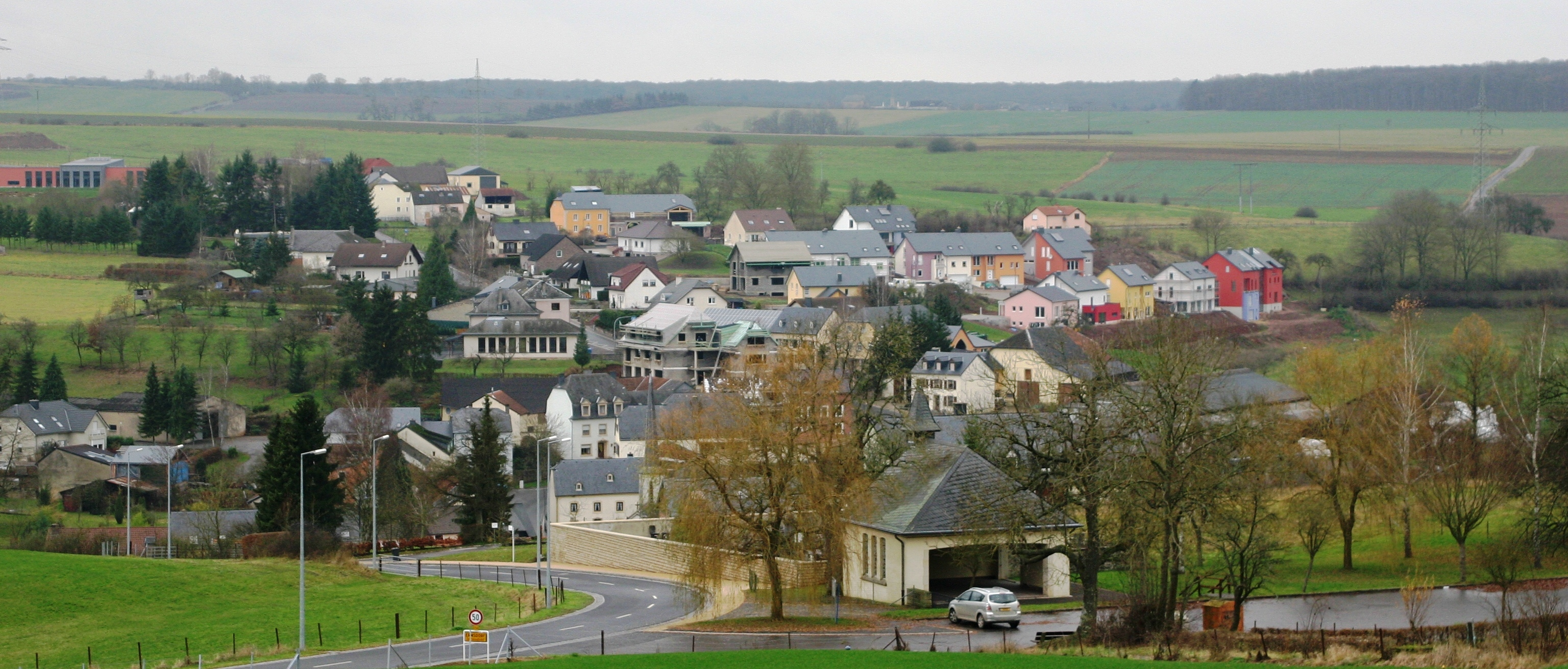
- Ermsdorf

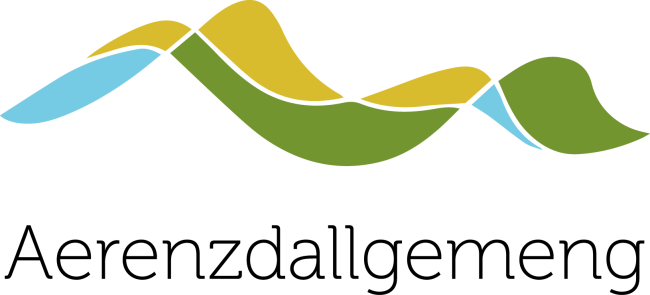
- Brandmark

- Map of Luxembourg with Vallée de l'Ernz highlighted in orange, and the canton in dark red
- Coordinates: 49.82°N 6.22°E
- Country: Luxembourg
- Canton: Diekirch

Government
  - Mayor: Bob Bintz

Area
  - Total: 39.73 km^{2} (15.34 sq mi)
  - Rank: 13th of 100
- Highest elevation: 420 m (1,380 ft)
  - Rank: 36th of 100
- Lowest elevation: 213 m (699 ft)
  - Rank: 31st of 100

Population (2025)
  - Total: 2,864
  - Rank: 60th of 100
  - Density: 72.09/km^{2} (186.7/sq mi)
  - Rank: 81st of 100
- Time zone: UTC+1 (CET)
  - Summer (DST): UTC+2 (CEST)
- LAU 2: LU0000610
- Website: www.medernach.lu

Vallée de l'Ernz (Luxembourgish: Ärenzdallgemeng) is a commune in northern Luxembourg, in the canton of Diekirch. It takes its name from its situation in the valley of the White Ernz river.

The commune of Vallée de l'Ernz was formed on 1 January 2012 from the former communes of Ermsdorf and Medernach. The law creating the Vallée de l'Ernz was passed on 24 May 2011. It has an area of 39.73 km^{2}.

== Populated places ==
The commune consists of the following villages:

Ermsdorf Section:

- Eppeldorf
- Ermsdorf
- Folkendeng
- Keiwelbach
- Stegen
- Backesmillen (lieu-dit)
- Bricherheck (lieu-dit)
- Bricherhaff (lieu-dit)
- Gilcher (lieu-dit)
- Hessemillen (lieu-dit)
- Hoossebierg (lieu-dit)
- Moderhaff (lieu-dit)
- Neimillen (lieu-dit)
- Reisermillen (lieu-dit)
- Spierberich (lieu-dit)
- Webeschhaff (lieu-dit)

Medernach Section:

- Medernach
- Marxberg
- Ousterbur
- Pletschette
- Savelborn (Note: Part of the farm belongs to the commune of Waldbillig.)
- Kitzebur

== Population ==
Historical population

Year	Pop.	±%
1821	1,394	—
1851	2,070	+48.5%
1900	1,697	−18.0%
1910	1,676	−1.2%
1922	1,590	−5.1%
1935	1,510	−5.0%

Year	Pop.	±%
1947	1,405	−7.0%
1960	1,295	−7.8%
1970	1,312	+1.3%
1981	1,421	+8.3%
1990	1,646	+15.8%
2000	1,786	+8.5%

Year	Pop.	±%
2005	1,890	+5.8%
2010	2,223	+17.6%
2015	2,520	+13.4%
2020	2,653	+5.3%
2021	2,687	+1.3%

Source data
