= Ermsdorf =

Ermsdorf Iermsdref
- Former commune
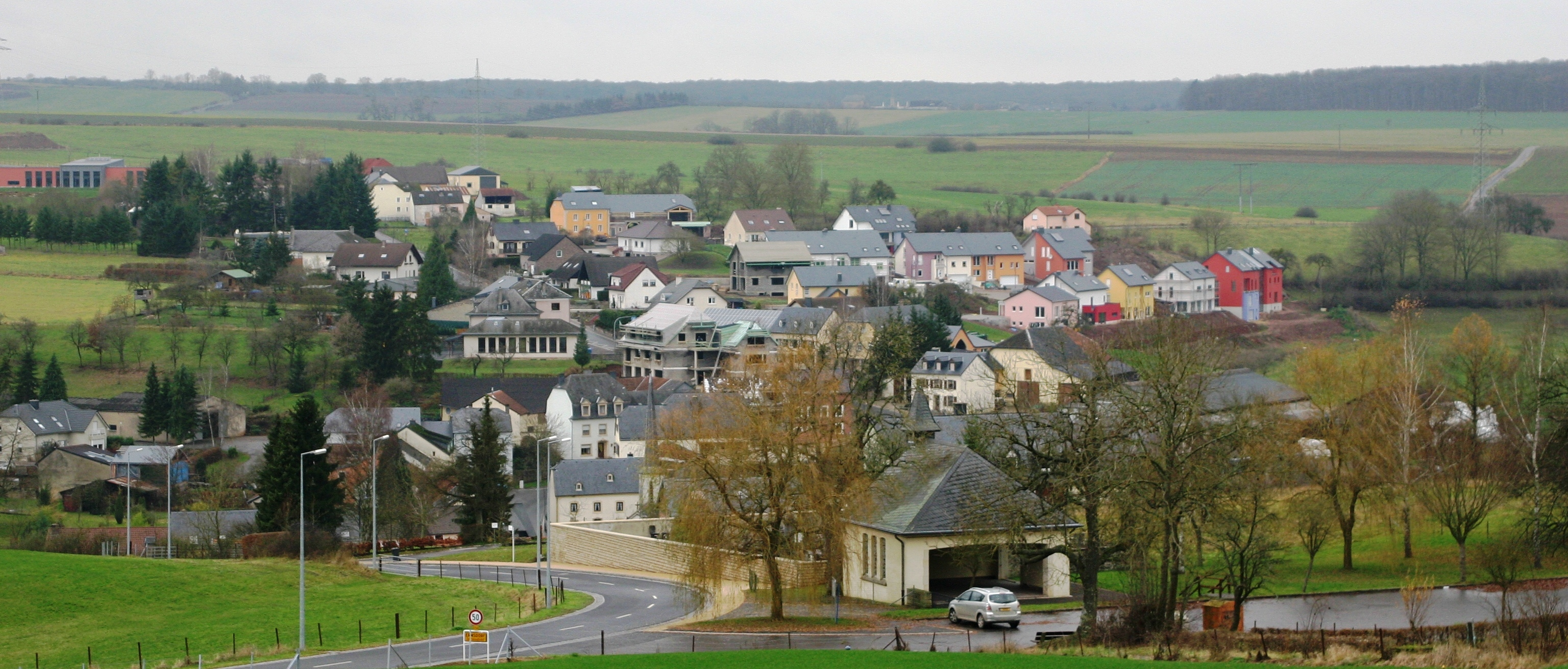

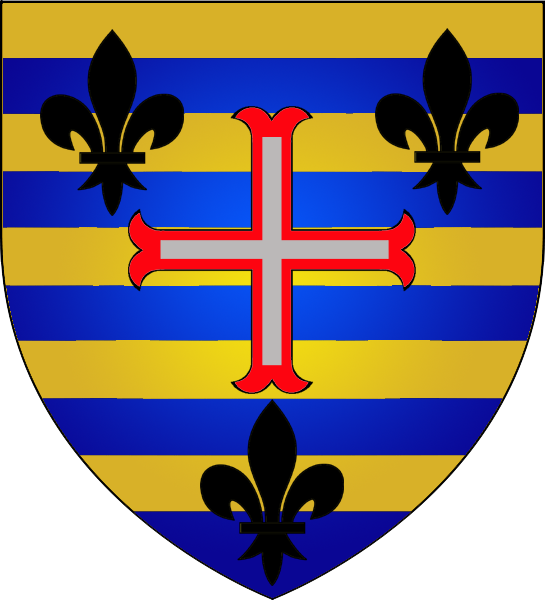
- Coat of arms

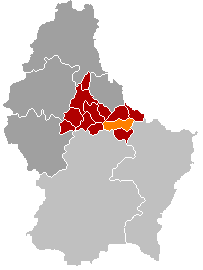
- Coordinates: 49.8289°N 6.2214°E
- Country: Luxembourg
- District: Diekirch
- Canton: Diekirch
- Commune: Vallée de l'Ernz
- Website: ermsdorf.lu

Ermsdorf (German pronunciation: [ˈɛʁmsˌdɔʁf]; Luxembourgish: Iermsdref) is a village and former commune in eastern Luxembourg. It is part of the canton of Diekirch, which is part of the district of Diekirch.

As of September 2026, the village of Ermsdorf, which lies in the south of the commune, has a population of 493.

In 2011, Ermsdorf merged with Medernach to become the commune of Vallée de l'Ernz.

== Former commune ==
The former commune consisted of the villages:

- Eppeldorf
- Ermsdorf
- Folkendeng
- Keiwelbach
- Stegen
- Backesmillen (lieu-dit)
- Bricherheck (lieu-dit)
- Bricherhaff (lieu-dit)
- Gilcher (lieu-dit)
- Hessemillen (lieu-dit)
- Hoossebierg (lieu-dit)
- Moderhaff (lieu-dit)
- Neimillen (lieu-dit)
- Reisermillen (lieu-dit)
- Spierberich (lieu-dit)
- Webeschhaff (lieu-dit)
