= Hoesdorf =

Village in Reisdorf, Luxembourg

Coordinates: 49°53′N 6°15′E

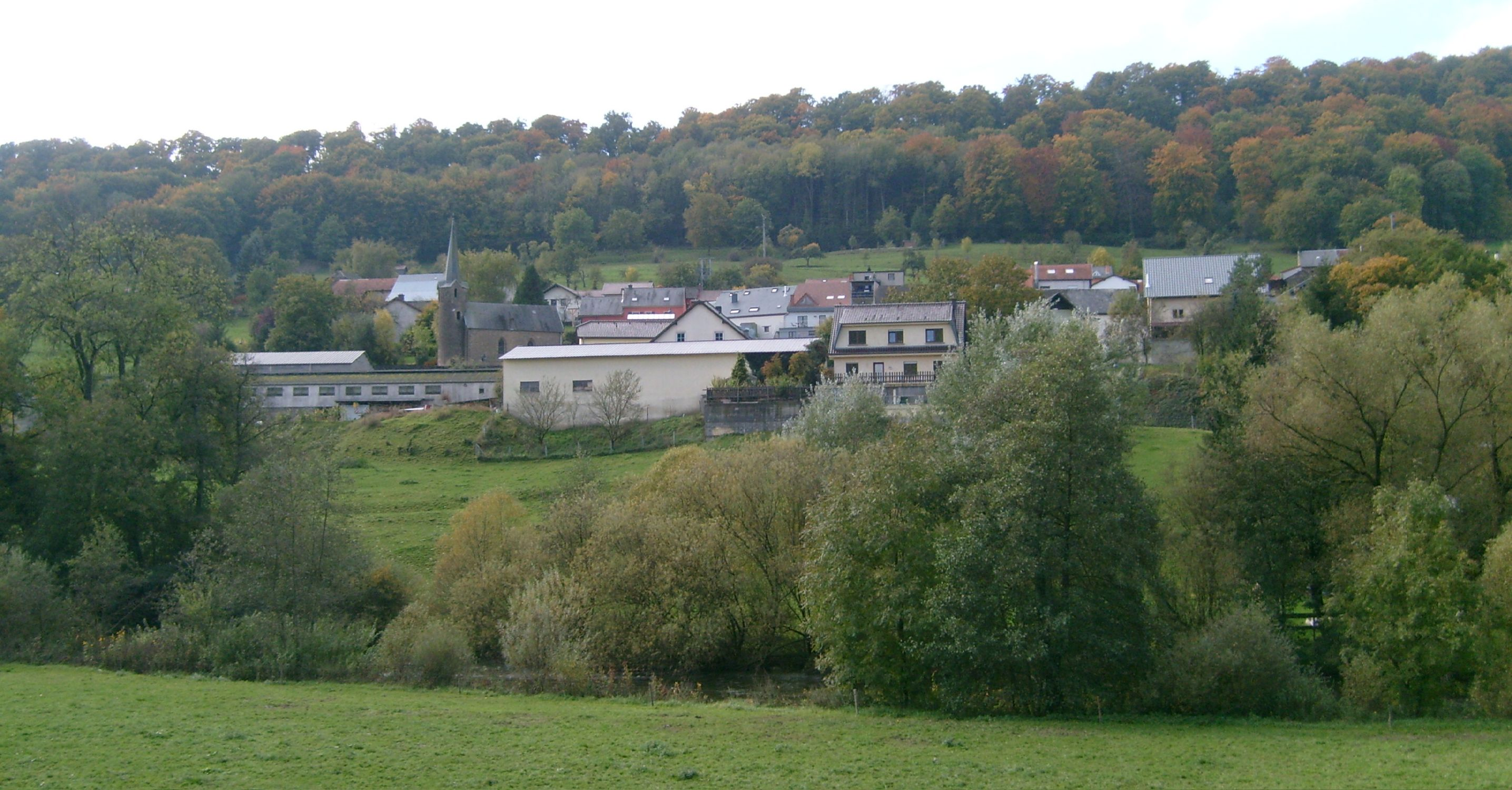
View from Germany on Hoesdorf, Luxembourg

Hoesdorf (Luxembourgish: Héischdref) is a village in the commune of Reisdorf, in eastern Luxembourg. As of September 2026, the village has a population of 152.
