= Félicie Erpelding-Schlesser =

Luxembourgish politician

Personal details
- Born: 27 May 1883 Oberfeulen, Luxembourg
- Died: 6 January 1970 (aged 86) Esch-sur-Alzette, Luxembourg
- Spouse: François Erpelding (m. 1905)
- Children: 3

Félicie Erpelding-Schlesser (27 May 1883 – 6 January 1970) was a Luxembourgish municipal politician. She was the first female member of the municipal council of Ettelbruck and vice-president of the Association of Municipal Councillors of the Worker's Party.

== Biography ==
Erpelding-Schlesser was born on 27 May 1883 in Oberfeulen, Luxembourg. Her parents were schoolteacher Peter Schlesser and his wife Margaretha Schlesser (née Reiter).

In 1905, Erpelding-Schlesser married the locomotive driver François Erpelding [lb] in Hollerich. He was a member of the Chamber of Deputies from 1920 to 1940, firstly for the Kartell Party and secondly for the Workers' Party (the forerunner of Luxembourg Socialist Workers' Party). They had three children.

On 24 September 1921, Erpelding-Schlesser became the first female member of the municipal council of Ettelbrück. She was re-elected in 1924 and was also elected the vice-president of the Association of Municipal Councillors of the Workers' Party. She lost her seat in the 1928 elections.

Erpelding-Schlesser was widowed when her husband died on 2 February 1961. She died on 6 January 1970 in Esch-sur-Alzette, Luxembourg. They were both buried in Oberfeulen.

== Legacy ==
A street in Ettelbrück was named in her honour in 2015.

To celebrate the occasion of the centenary of universal suffrage, a bronze sculpture of Erpelding-Schlesser exercising her right to vote was unveiled in Ettelbruck in 2021. The statue was made by Nadine Zangarini and commissioned by the National Council of Women in Luxembourg.
