= Erpeldange Castle =

Coordinates: 49°51′36″N 6°06′44″E

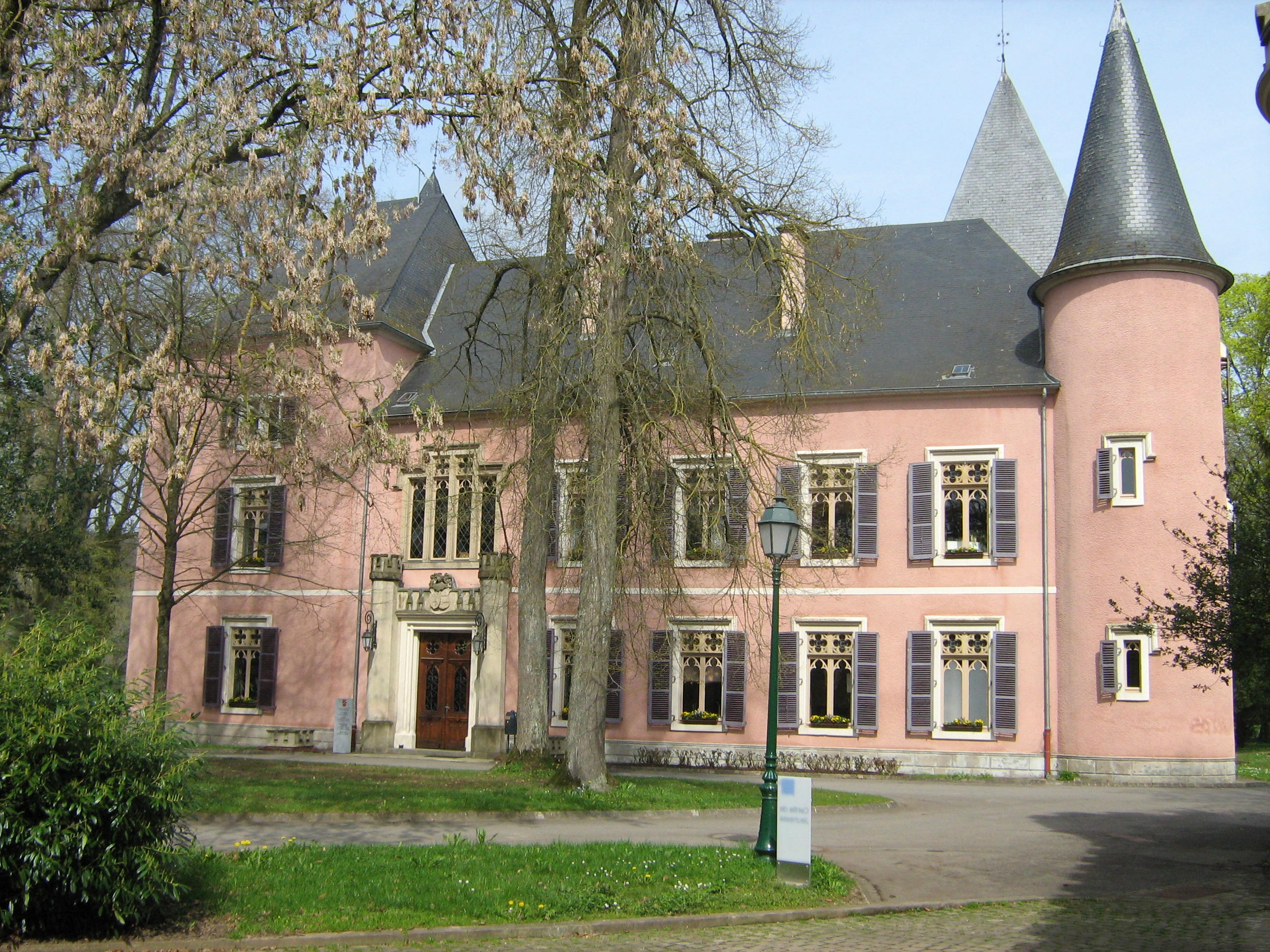
Erpeldange Castle

Erpeldange Castle (Luxembourgish: Schlass Ierpeldeng; French: Château d'Erpeldange; German: Schloss Erpeldingen), located in the town of the same name in north-eastern Luxembourg, now houses the administrative offices for the Commune of Erpeldange, with its grounds open to the public. It has a history dating back to the 13th century.

== History ==
During the 12th century, there appears to have been a tower and wooden fort at the site of the present castle. In the 13th century, Frederic and Gerard d'Erpeldange, the first lords of Erpeldange, built a fortified stone castle guarding the valley at the point where the River Sûre meets the Alzette. The property passed successively into the hands of the Counts of Vianden, and the Brandenburg-Outscheid and von Moestroff-Kerpen families. Through marriage, the Gondersdorf family inherited the castle and in 1630 transformed it into a luxurious residence for their daughter. In 1677, it was inherited by Charles François baron de Failly de Sancy and Marie Marguerite de Giraldin. By that time, it was no longer of any military value as a quiet park had replaced its defences. Abandoned by the Prel family in the 19th century, it was used as a rectory. During the Second World War, the castle was damaged as a result of its use first by the Germans and then by American troops. The castle changed hands a number of times until it was acquired by the State in 1983. The commune's administrative offices have been housed there since 1987. The building still contains two fine Renaissance fireplaces.

== See also ==
- List of castles in Luxembourg
