= Burden, Luxembourg =

Coordinates: 49°53′N 6°06′E

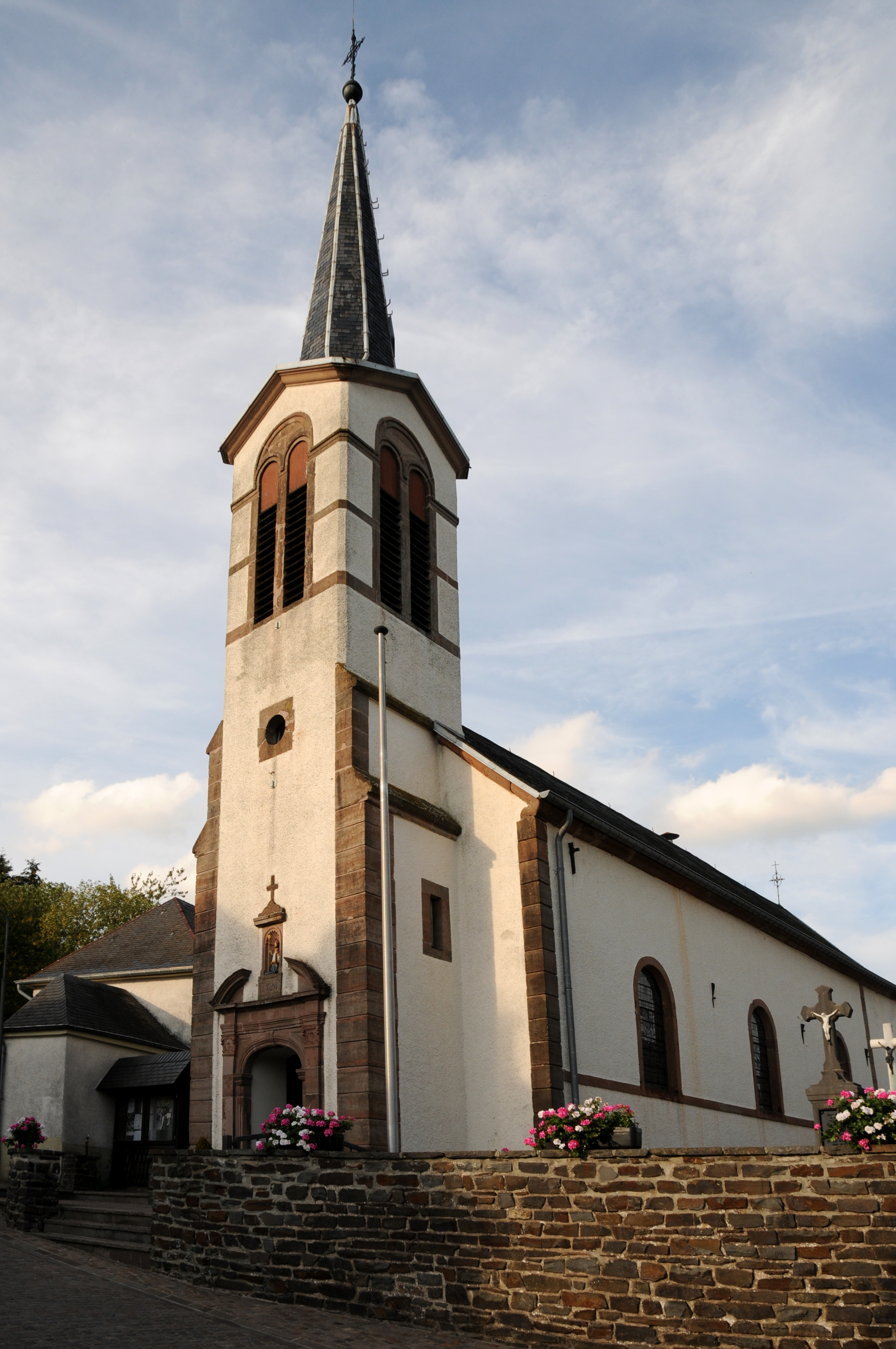

Burden (Luxembourgish: Bierden [ˈbiːɐ̯dən], German: Bürden [ˈbʏʁdn̩]) is a village in the commune of Erpeldange, in northern Luxembourg. As of September 2026, the village had a population of 521.

Burden is accessible by car via Warken and Bourscheid. It is connected for unmotorized traffic to the N27 road with a Bailey bridge.

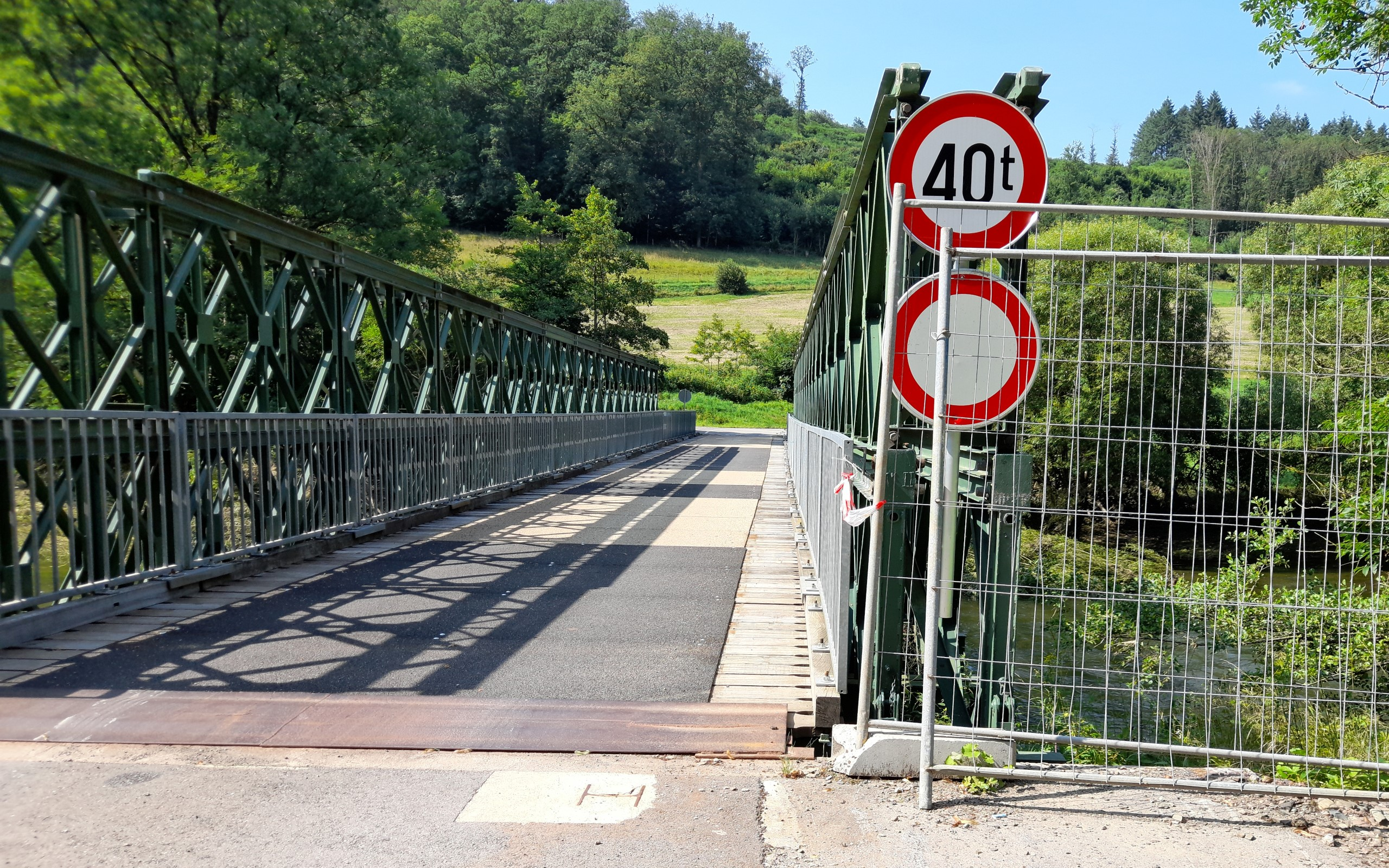
