= Adrien Ries =

Luxembourgish economist

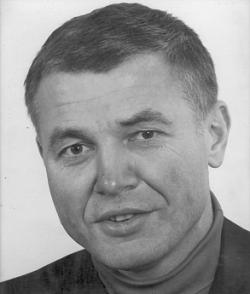
Adrien Ries

Adrien Ries (14 July 1933 – 10 October 1991) was a Luxembourgish economist. Much of his work revolved around transport economics, particularly the automobile, and the spatial implications of economic activity. He was also responsible for coining the idea of 'Nordstad', a unified urban area in northern Luxembourg to decentralize economic activity from Luxembourg City and the Red Lands. From 1982 to 1996 he worked for the European Commission as an economist. He was also known as an avid hiker and author.
