= Niederfeulen =

Coordinates: 49°51′N 6°03′E

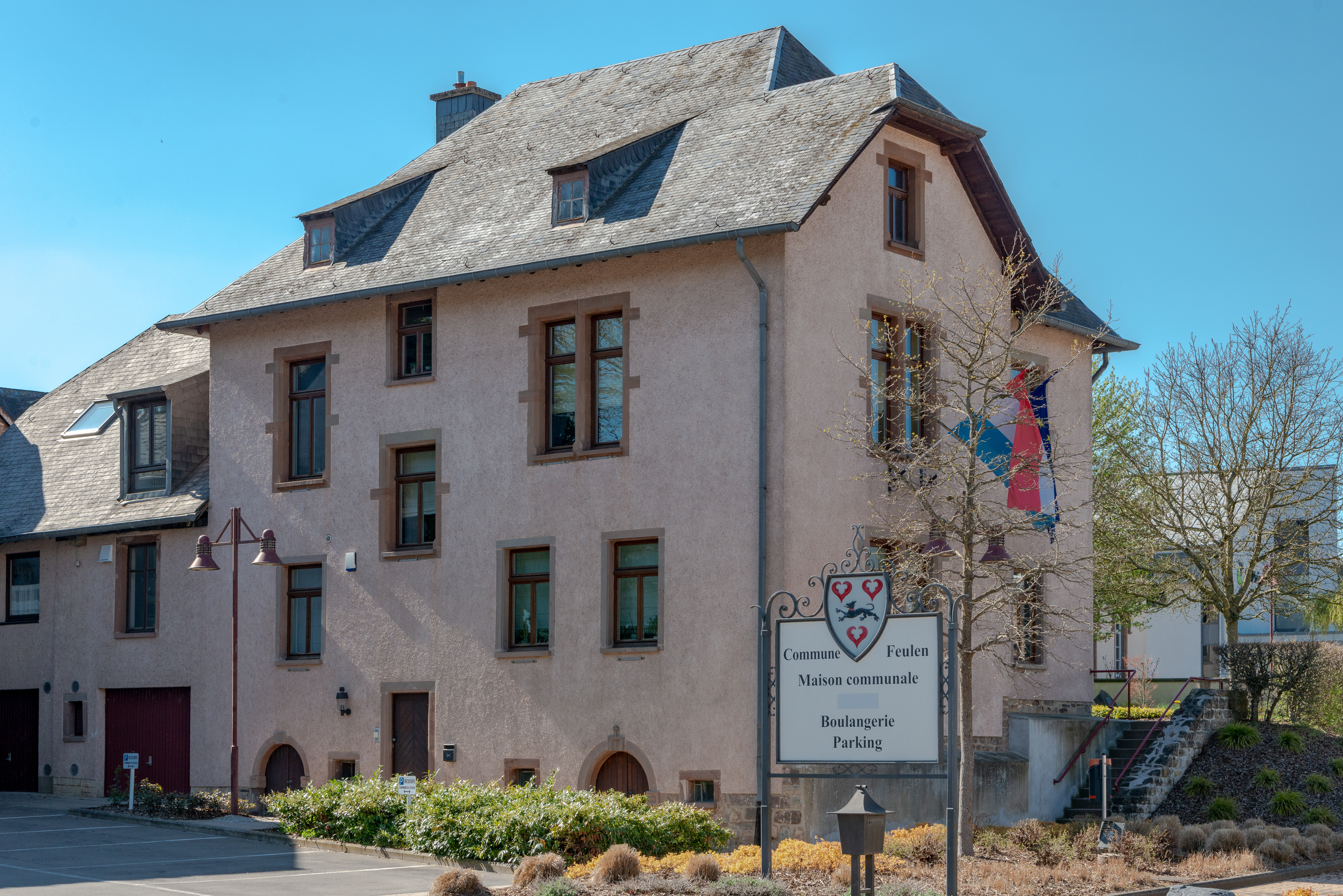
Town hall in Niederfeulen

Niederfeulen (German pronunciation: [ˈniːdɐˌfɔʏlən], lit. 'Lower Feulen', in contrast to "Upper Feulen"; Luxembourgish: Nidderfeelen) is a small town in the commune of Feulen, in central Luxembourg. As of September 2026, the town has a population of 1,745.
