= Ingeldorf =

Town in the commune of Erpeldange in Luxembourg

Coordinates: 49°51′N 6°08′E

Ingeldorf (German pronunciation: [ˈɪŋl̩ˌdɔʁf]; Luxembourgish: Angelduerf [ˈɑŋəlduːɐ̯f]) is a small town in the commune of Erpeldange, in central Luxembourg. As of September 2026, the town has a population of 843.
