= Oberfeulen =

Coordinates: 49°51′N 6°02′E

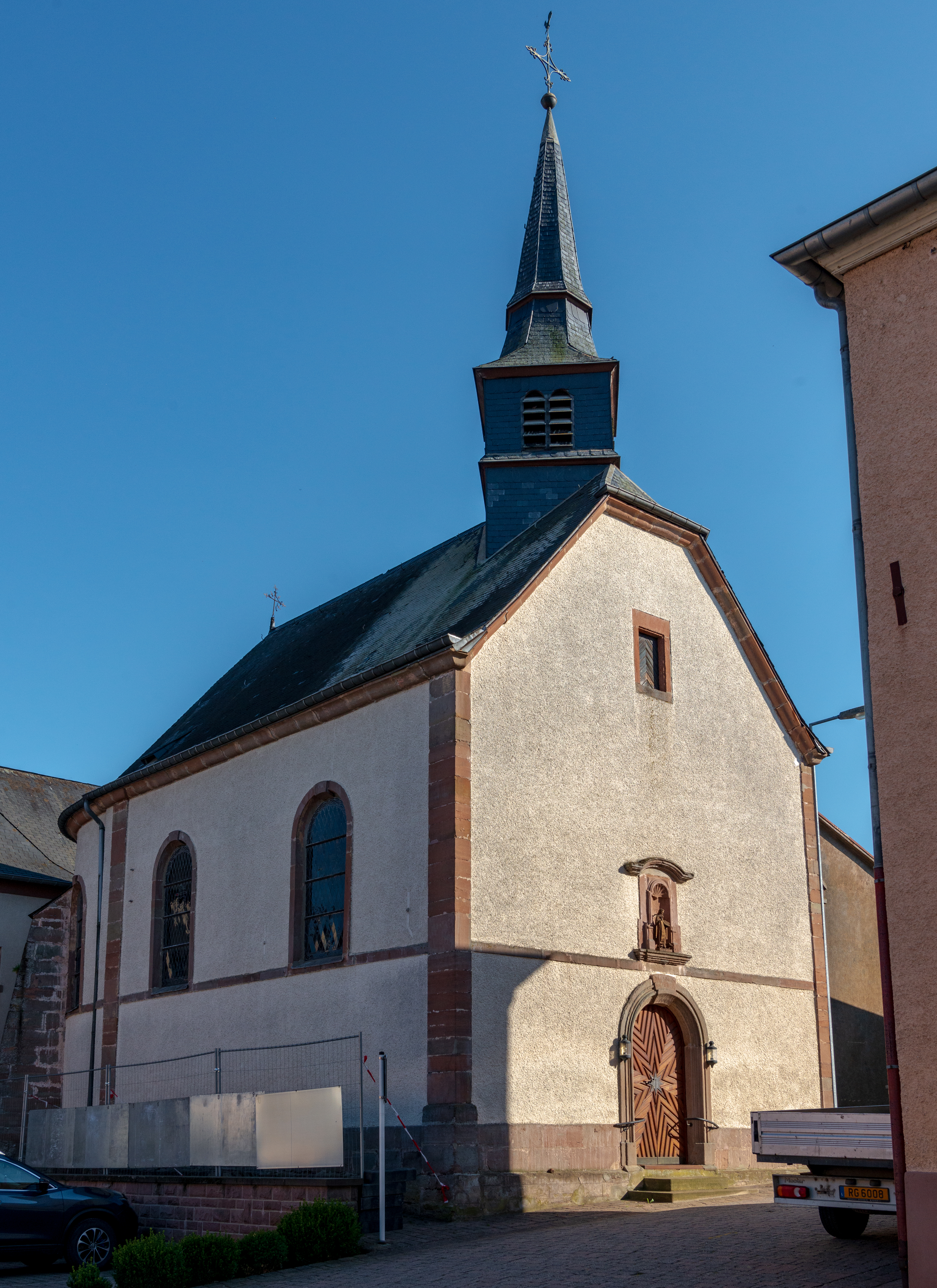
Saint Anthony the Great Chapel

Oberfeulen (German pronunciation: [ˈoːbɐˌfɔʏlən], lit. 'Upper Feulen', in contrast to "Lower Feulen"; Luxembourgish: Uewerfeelen) is a small town in the commune of Feulen, in central Luxembourg. As of September 2026, the town has a population of 702.

== Notable Oberfeuleners ==
Félicie Erpelding-Schlesser (1883–1970), municipal politician in Ettelbrück.
