= Eppeldorf =

Coordinates: 49°51′N 6°15′E

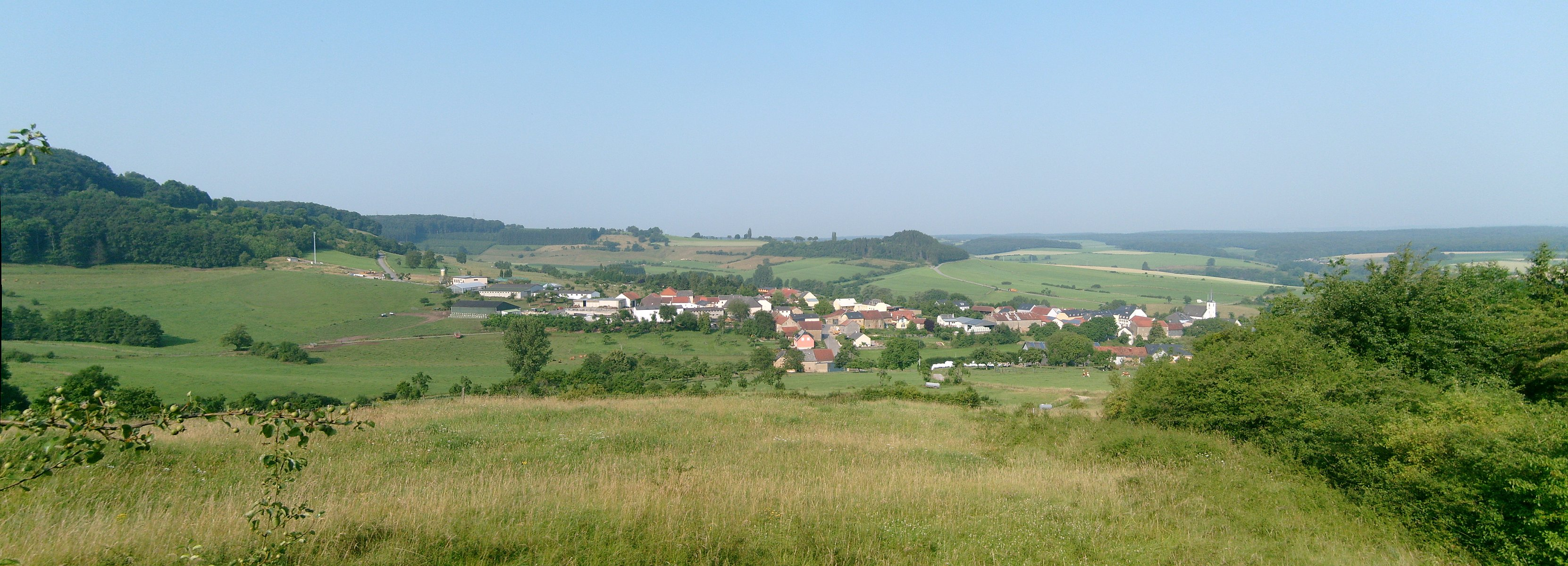
Panorama

Eppeldorf (Luxembourgish: Eppelduerf) is a village in the commune of Ärenzdallgemeng, in eastern Luxembourg between Bettendorf and Beaufort. As of September 2026, the village has a population of 293.

== Geography ==
The village is situated at an altitude of 280 meters.
