= Birtrange Castle =

Castle in Luxembourg

Coordinates: 49.8264°N 6.0891°E

- Schlass Biertreng
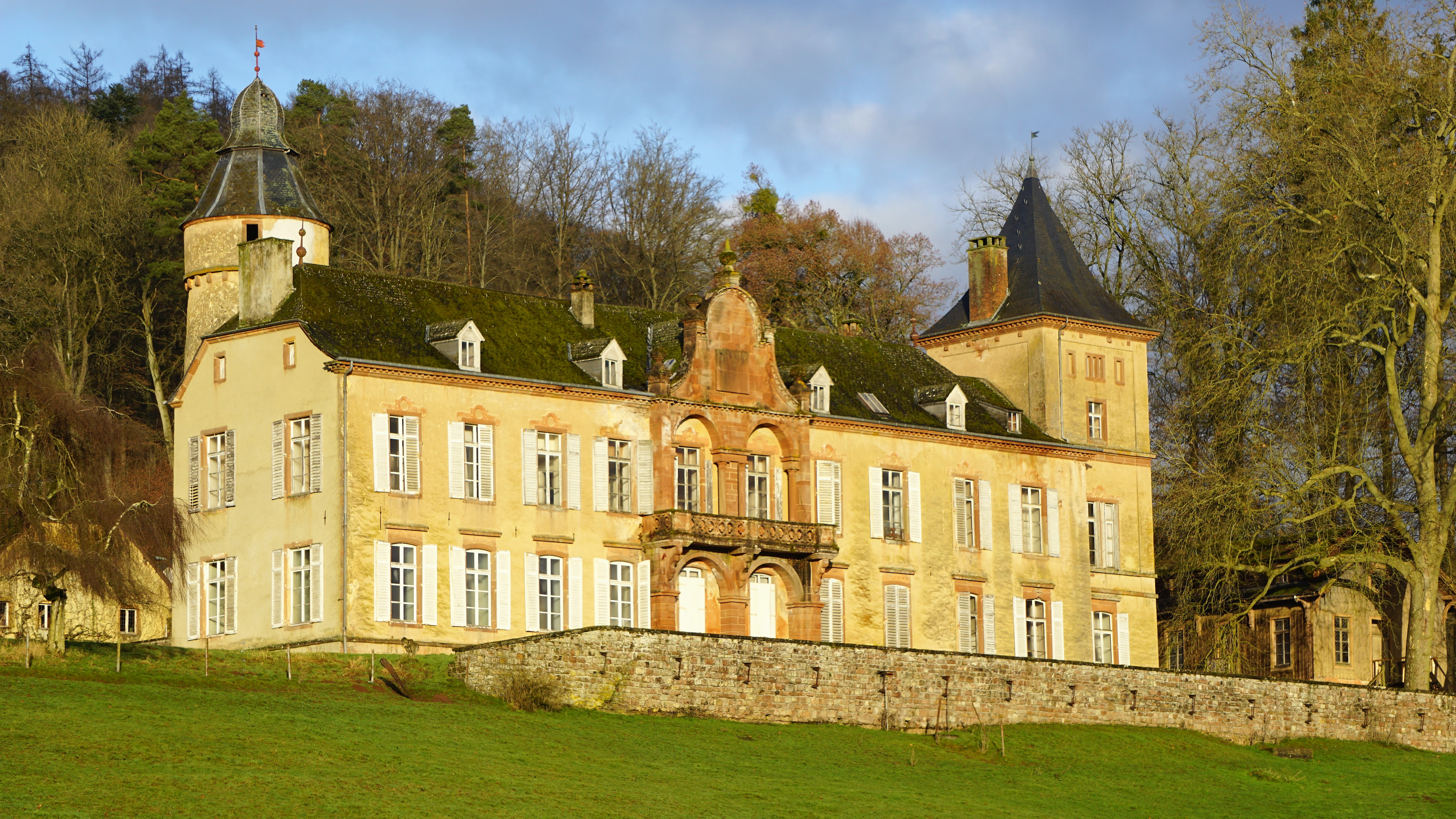
- Front of Birtrange castle in January 2022
- Interactive map of the Birtrange Castle area

General information
- Type: Castle
- Architectural style: English Gothic architecture
- Location: Schieren, Luxembourg
- Year built: 13th century

Birtrange Castle (Luxembourgish: Schlass Biertreng; French: Château de Birtrange) is a castle near Schieren, Luxembourg.

The castle was constructed in the 13th century by Gaspard-Florent de Breiderbach, and built in an English Gothic style. It was acquired in 1813 by the De Blochhausen family, who held the castle until 1935, when it came to be under the control of the De Broqueville family. During World War II American troops were stationed inside of the building. Inscriptions and graffiti made by these soldiers can still be seen on the castle walls. The castle was abandoned in 2002.

After the death of Baroness Claudine de Broqueville the castle was donated to the Red Cross. The Baroness wished for a music festival to be organized on the property following her death. In honor of this wish, the Red Cross organized a 3 day long festival hosting 2500 people from August 2-August 4, 2019. There were numerous objections to this event based on potential environmental damage. According to Carole Dieschbourg, the Minister of the Environment, there were not sufficient criteria to forbid the festival. Sam Tanson, the Minister of Culture, and Dieschbourg stated that they would not permit any damage to the site. Guards were sent to the castle to monitor the festival. Numerous bins were placed on the site and chemical products were prohibited. The music was also limited to ensure potential damage to the building was limited. If any damage occurred, the organizers would be held responsible.

In 2022, the Red Cross expressed a desire to auction off the castle due to its poor condition and high maintenance costs, the proceeds of which would be reinvested by the Red Cross into other efforts. The Red Cross held an auction, and the minimum bid was 5.2 million euros. Luxembourgish entrepreneur Jos Bourg bought the home, and he began renovation work on the castle. The Department of National Sites and Monuments in Luxembourg assisted the renovation work.
