= Erpeldange-sur-Sûre =

Erpeldange-sur-Sûre Ierpeldeng op der Sauer (Luxembourgish) Erpeldingen an der Sauer (German)
- Commune
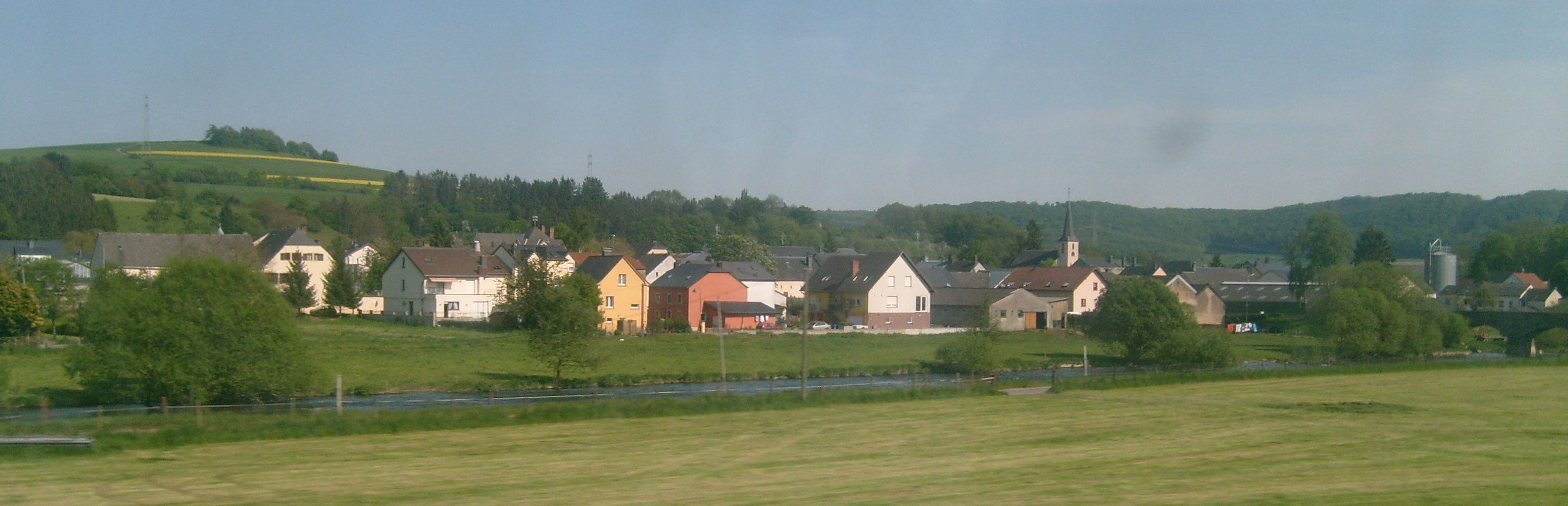

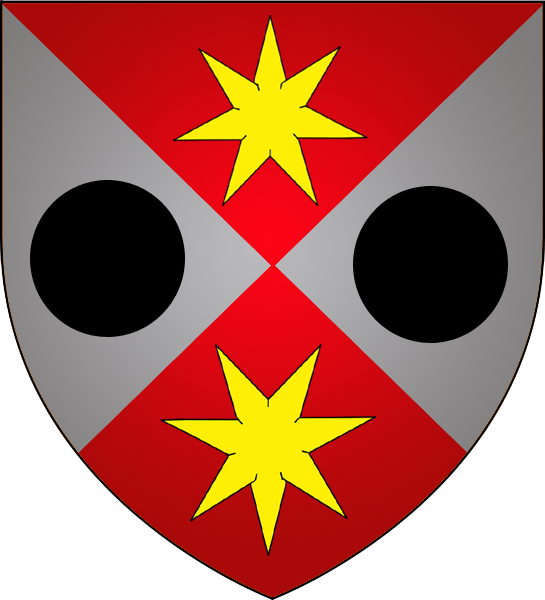
- Coat of arms Brandmark

- Map of Luxembourg with Erpeldange highlighted in orange, and the canton in dark red
- Coordinates: 49.8639°N 6.1139°E
- Country: Luxembourg
- Canton: Diekirch

Government
  - Mayor: Claude Gleis

Area
  - Total: 17.97 km^{2} (6.94 sq mi)
  - Rank: 64th of 100
- Highest elevation: 459 m (1,506 ft)
  - Rank: 24th of 100
- Lowest elevation: 190 m (620 ft)
  - Rank: 21st of 100

Population (2025)
  - Total: 2,596
  - Rank: 64th of 100
  - Density: 144.5/km^{2} (374.2/sq mi)
  - Rank: 54th of 100
- Time zone: UTC+1 (CET)
  - Summer (DST): UTC+2 (CEST)
- LAU 2: LU0000604
- Website: erpeldange.lu

Erpeldange-sur-Sûre (French pronunciation: [ɛʁpɛldɑ̃ʒ syʁ syʁ]; Luxembourgish: Ierpeldeng op der Sauer [ˈiːɐ̯pəldeŋ op dɐ ˈzɑʊ̯ɐ]; German: Erpeldingen an der Sauer [ˈɛʁpl̩dɪŋən ʔan deːɐ̯ ˈzaʊɐ]; all lit. 'Erpeldange/Ierpeldeng/Erpeldingen on (the) Sûre/Sauer') is a commune and small town in north-eastern Luxembourg. It lies along the river Sûre, between Ettelbruck and Diekirch. It is part of the canton of Diekirch.

As of September 2026, the town of Erpeldange, which lies in the centre of the commune, has a population of 1,411. Other towns within the commune include Burden and Ingeldorf.

Erpeldange-sur-Sûre was formed on 1 July 1850, when it was detached from the commune of Ettelbruck, along with the commune of Schieren. The law forming Erpeldange-sur-Sûre was passed on the 22 January 1850.

Erpeldange Castle now houses the commune's administrative offices. It has a history dating from the 13th century.

== Demographics ==
Between 2011 and 2021, Erpeldange-sur-Sûre was the slowest growing commune in Luxembourg.

Historical population

Year	Pop.	±%
1821	604	—
1851	856	+41.7%
1871	754	−11.9%
1880	649	−13.9%
1890	562	−13.4%
1900	676	+20.3%
1910	676	+0.0%
1922	668	−1.2%
1930	658	−1.5%

Year	Pop.	±%
1947	593	−9.9%
1960	646	+8.9%
1970	864	+33.7%
1981	1,160	+34.3%
1991	1,548	+33.4%
2001	2,061	+33.1%
2011	2,295	+11.4%
2021	2,435	+6.1%

Source: Le Portail des Statistiques du Luxembourg

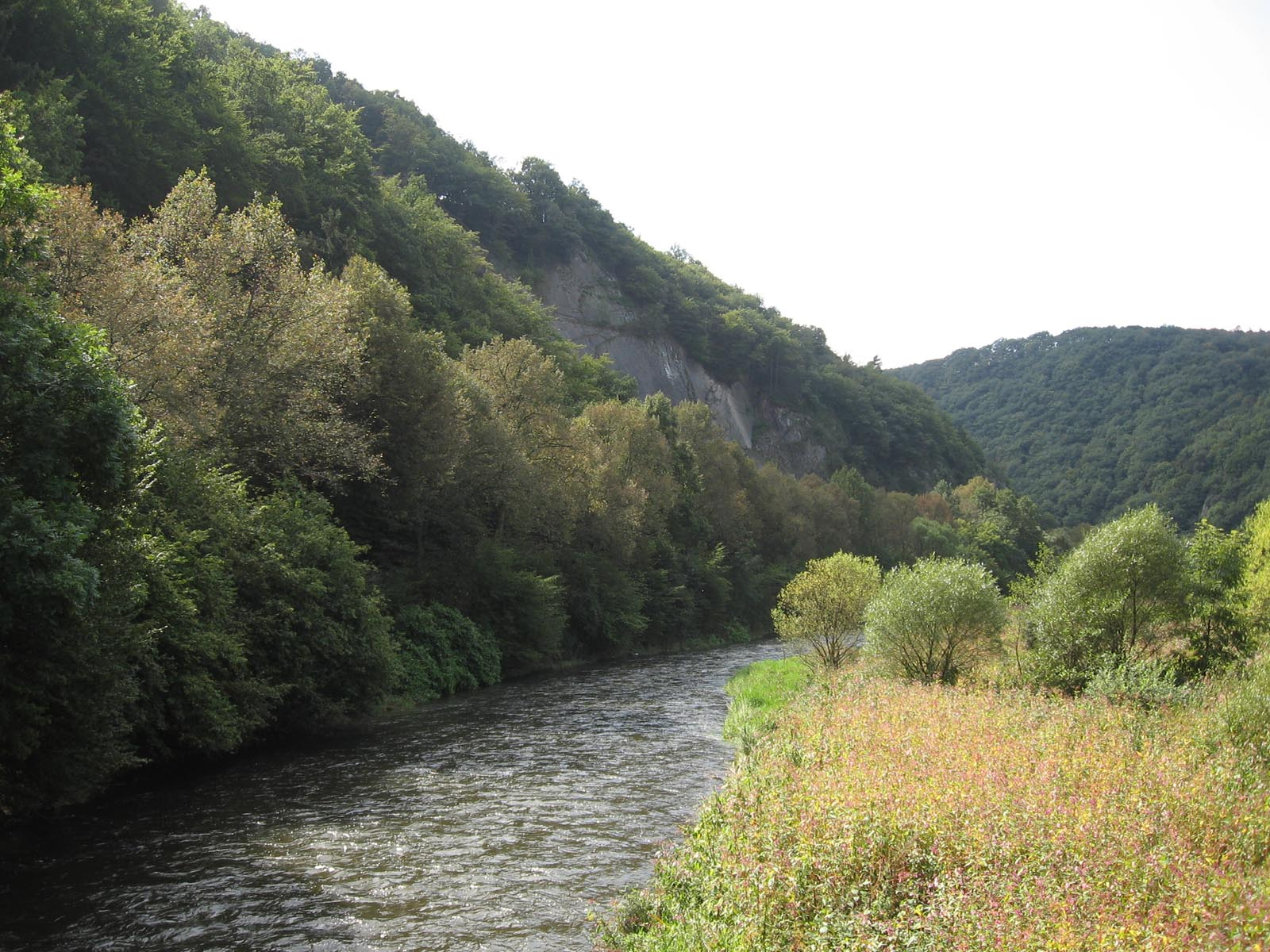
Sûre River at Erpeldange-sur-Sûre

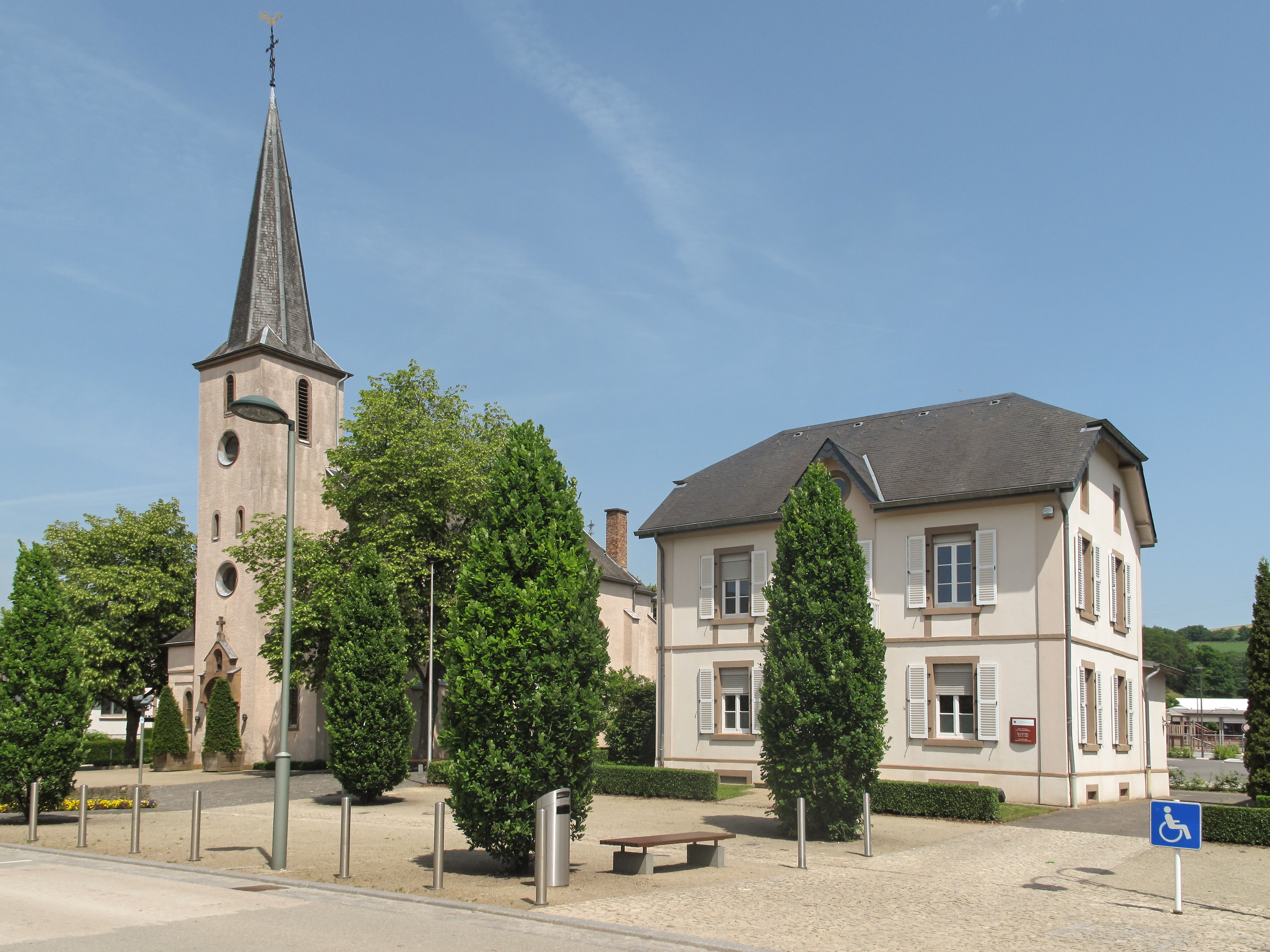
Erpeldange, church (l'église de la Conversion-de-Saint-Paul) in the street

== Notable people ==
- André Bauler (born 1964), Luxembourgish politician, Mayor of Erpeldange (2011-2013), Vice President of the Chamber of Deputies (since 2026)
- Leandro Barreiro (born 2000), Luxembourgish football player (Benfica, Luxembourg national football team)
