= Stegen, Luxembourg =

Coordinates: 49°50′N 6°10′E

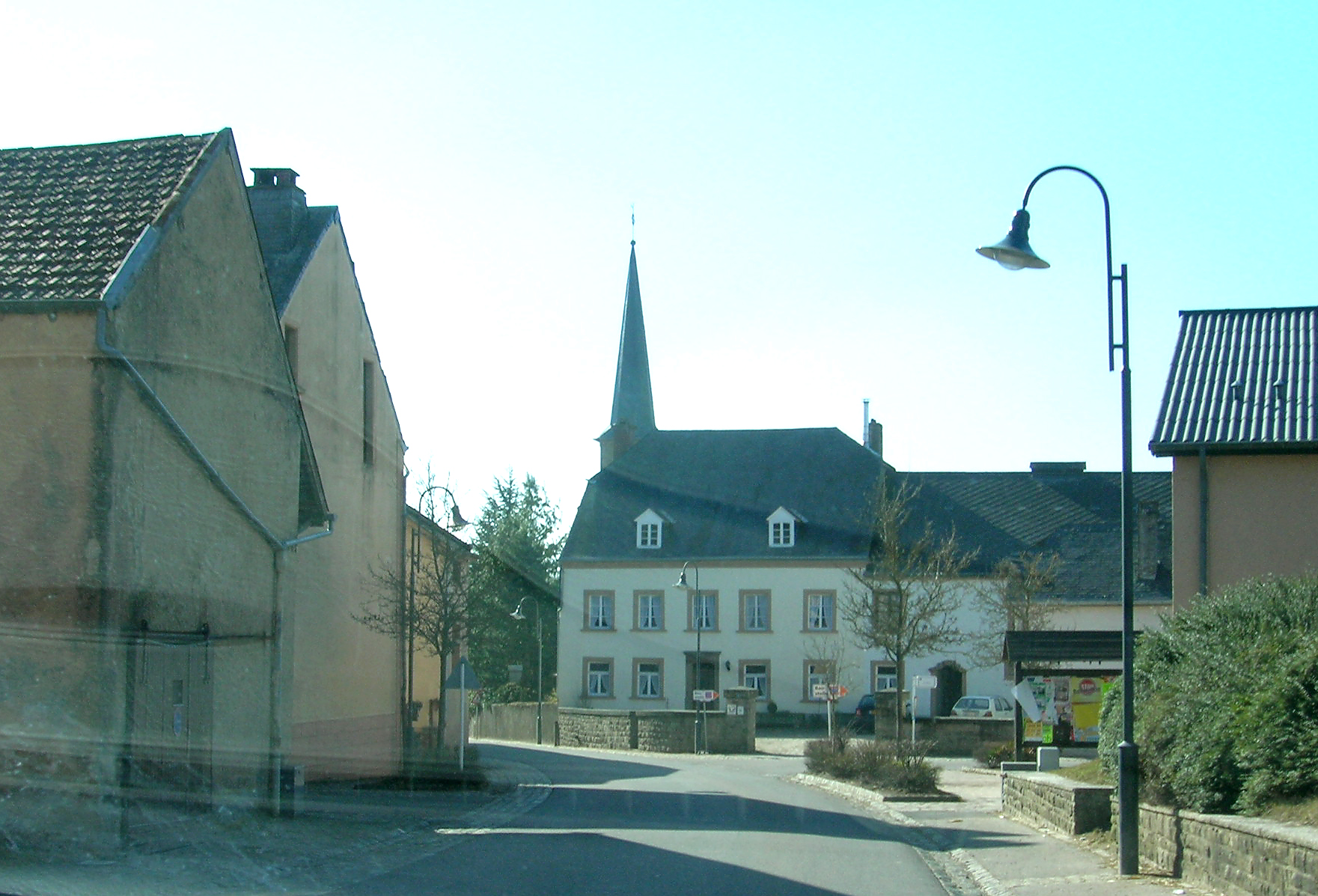
Steeën

Stegen (German pronunciation: [ˈʃteːɡn̩]; Luxembourgish: Steeën) is a village in the commune of Ärenzdallgemeng, in eastern Luxembourg. The village has a population of 576 as of September 2026.

The Saint Bartholomew church of Stegen was classified as a national monument in 2021.

The stream Tirelbaach is flowing through the eastern part of Stegen.

Stegen is home to the goat farm Bio Baltes in Um Suewel. It produces goat cheese for a large number of supermarkets throughout Luxembourg.
