= Reisdorf =

Reisdorf Reisduerf (Luxembourgish)
- Commune
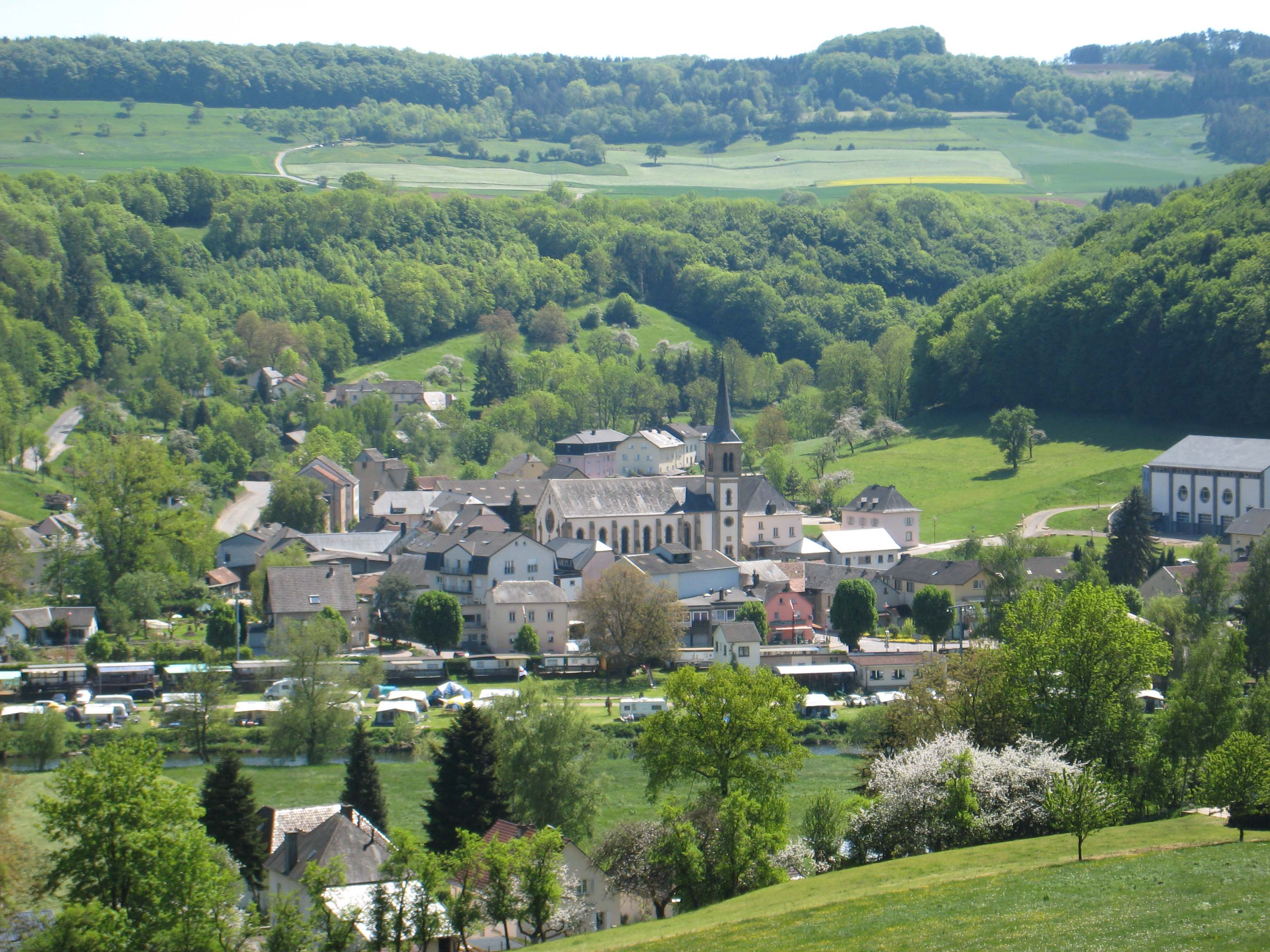
- Reisdorf seen from the north

- Coat of arms

- Map of Luxembourg with Reisdorf highlighted in orange, and the canton in dark red
- Coordinates: 49.8667°N 6.2667°E
- Country: Luxembourg
- Canton: Diekirch

Government
  - Mayor: Jean-Pierre Schiltz

Area
  - Total: 14.84 km^{2} (5.73 sq mi)
  - Rank: 80th of 100
- Highest elevation: 406 m (1,332 ft)
  - Rank: 44th of 100
- Lowest elevation: 175 m (574 ft)
  - Rank: 15th of 100

Population (2026)
  - Total: 1,462
  - Rank: 94th of 100
  - Density: 98.52/km^{2} (255.2/sq mi)
  - Rank: 72nd of 100
- Time zone: UTC+1 (CET)
  - Summer (DST): UTC+2 (CEST)
- LAU 2: LU0000608
- Website: reisdorf.lu

Reisdorf (German pronunciation: [ˈʁaɪsdɔʁf]; Luxembourgish: Reisduerf) is a commune and small town in eastern Luxembourg, on the river Sauer. It is part of the canton of Diekirch.

As of September 2026, the town of Reisdorf itself, which lies in the centre of the commune, had a population of 949. Other towns within the commune include Bigelbach, Hoesdorf, and Wallendorf-Pont. It’s also the starting point of a branch of the River Sûre.

== Population ==
Historical population

Year	Pop.	±%
1821	515	—
1851	641	+24.5%
1900	631	−1.6%
1910	618	−2.1%
1922	637	+3.1%
1935	598	−6.1%

Year	Pop.	±%
1947	510	−14.7%
1960	516	+1.2%
1970	502	−2.7%
1981	543	+8.2%
1990	557	+2.6%
2000	734	+31.8%

Year	Pop.	±%
2005	858	+16.9%
2010	1,027	+19.7%
2015	1,105	+7.6%
2020	1,276	+15.5%
2021	1,288	+0.9%

Source data

== Gallery ==
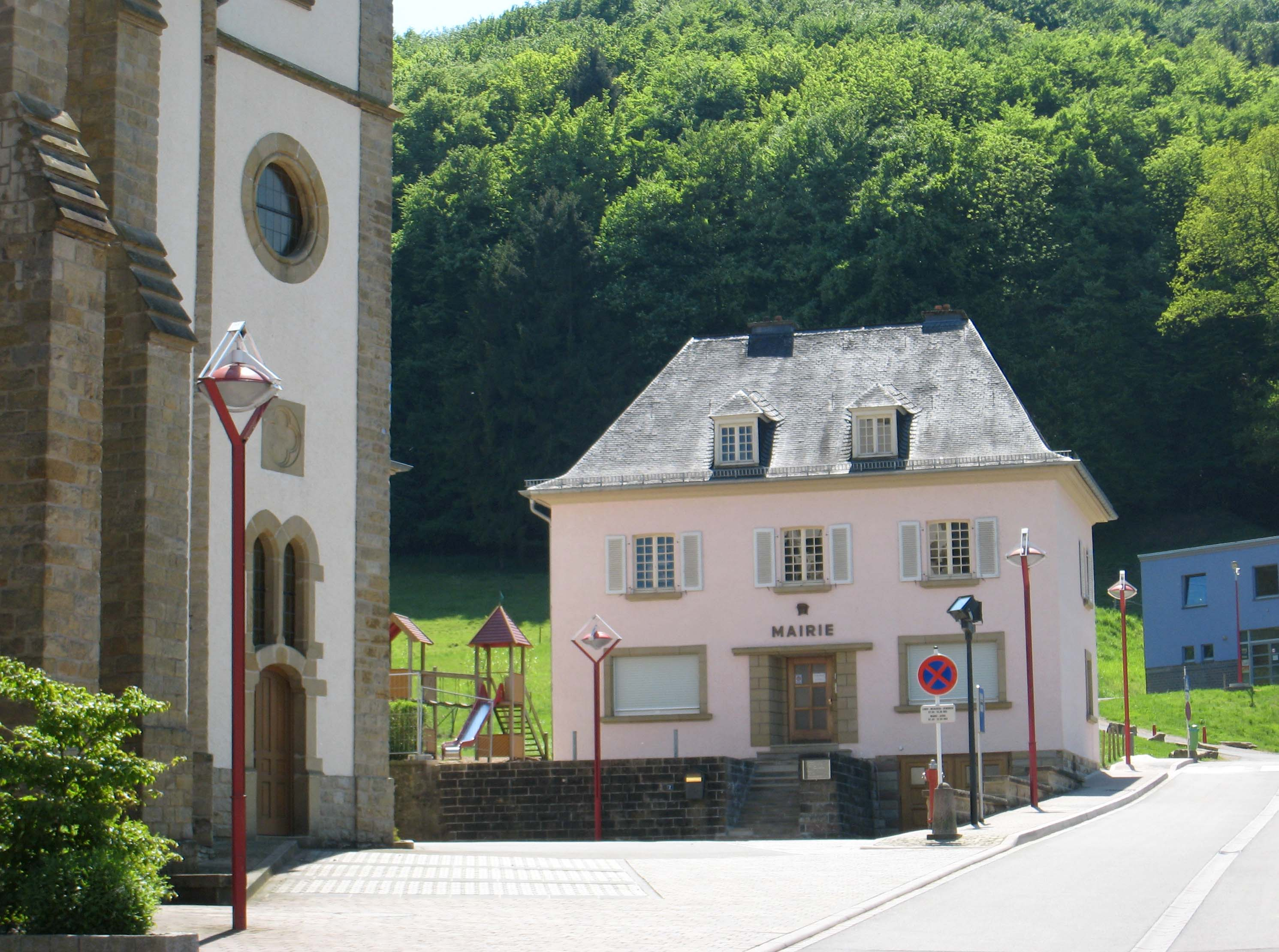
Reisdorf town hall

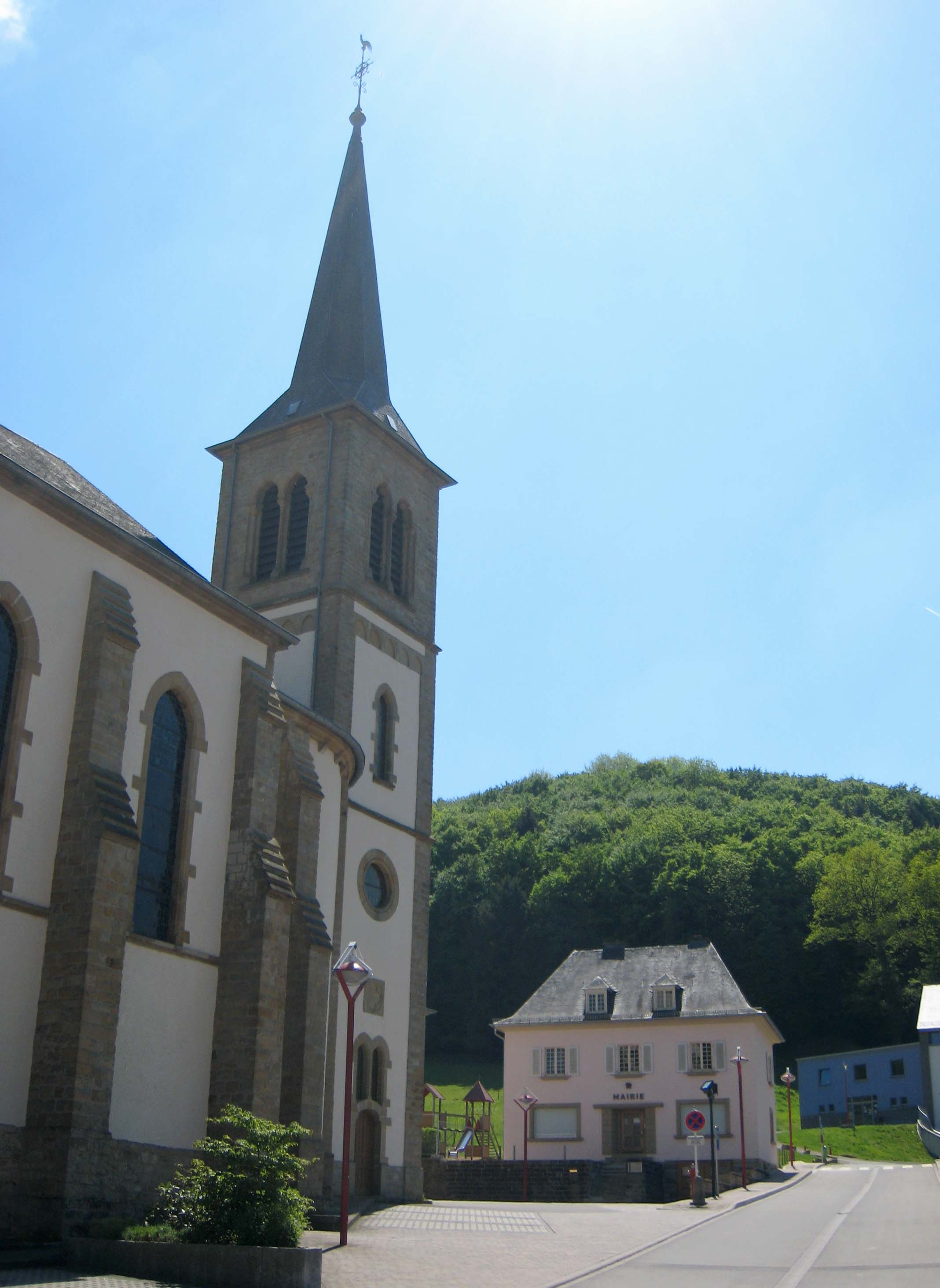
Reisdorf town hall and church

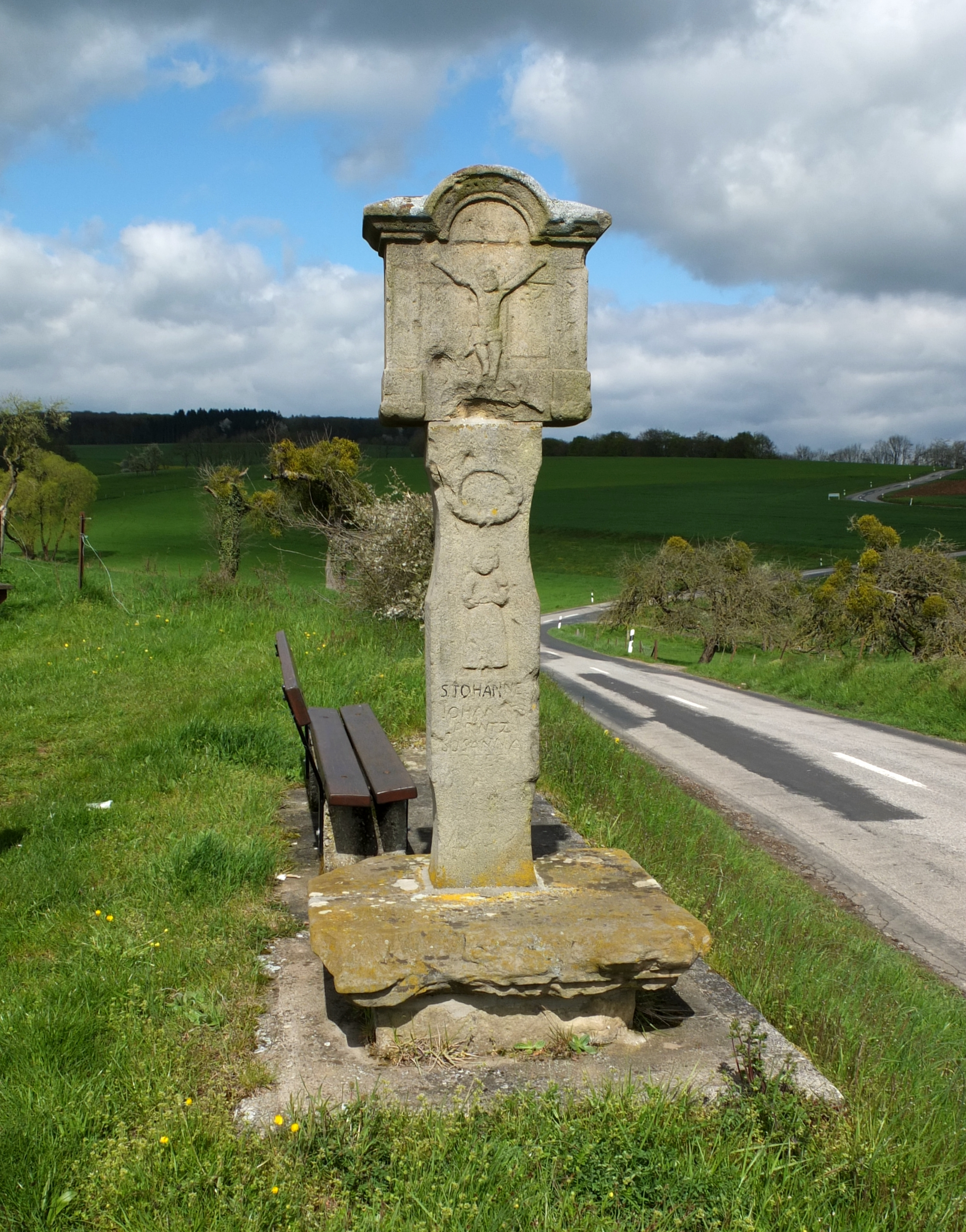
Wayside cross at the N10, just outside the town

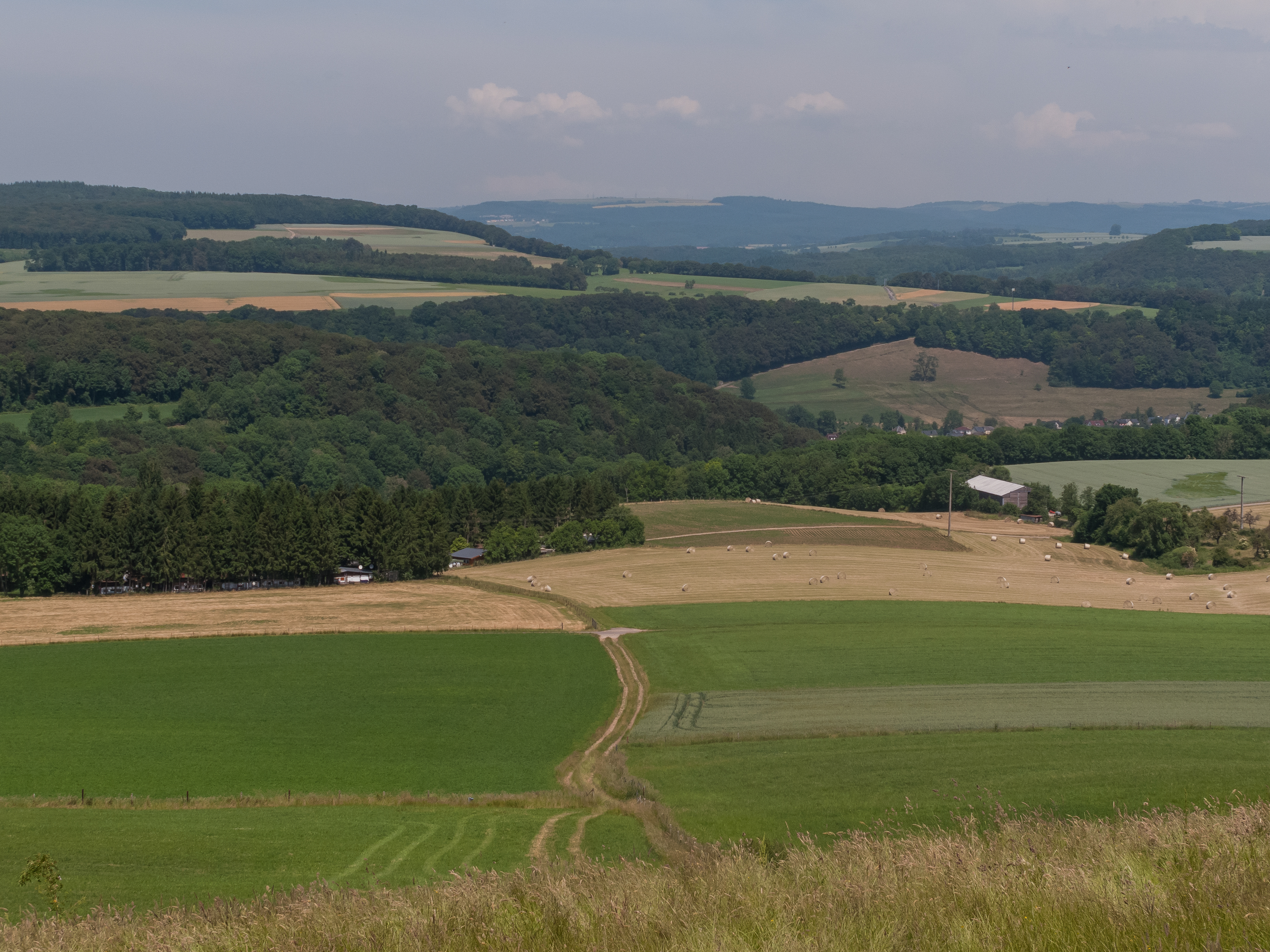
Panorama between Reisdorf and Beaufort
