= Dillingen, Luxembourg =

Coordinates: 49°51′N 6°19′E

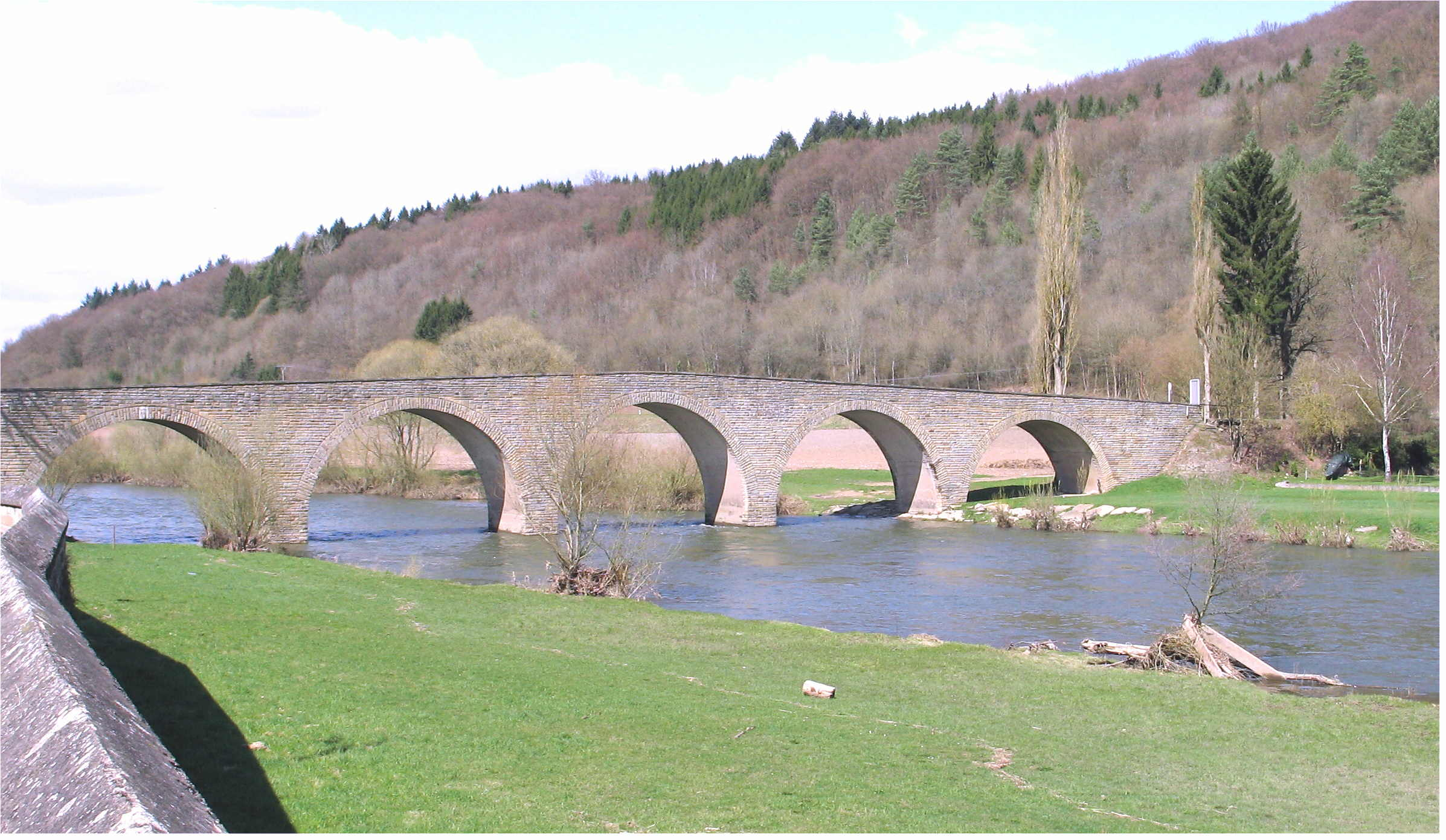
Bridge in Dillingen, Luxembourg

Dillingen (German pronunciation: [ˈdɪlɪŋən]; Luxembourgish: Déiljen) is a village in the commune of Beaufort, in eastern Luxembourg. As of September 2026, the village has a population of 298.
