= Canton of Diekirch =

Canton of Diekirch Kanton Dikrech (Luxembourgish) Kanton Diekirch (German)
- Canton
- Coat of arms

- Coordinates: 49°51′N 6°12′E
- Country: Luxembourg
- Legislative constituency: Nord
- LAU 1: LU00006
- Communes (cities in bold): Bettendorf; Bourscheid; Diekirch; Erpeldange; Ettelbruck; Feulen; Mertzig; Reisdorf; Schieren; Vallée de l'Ernz

Area
  - Total: 204.5 km^{2} (79.0 sq mi)
  - Rank: 8th of 12
- Highest elevation (5th of 12): 525 m (1,722 ft)
- Lowest elevation (4th of 12): 175 m (574 ft)

Population (2026)
  - Total: 36,530
  - Rank: 4th of 12
  - Density: 178.6/km^{2} (462.7/sq mi)
  - Rank: 5th of 12

Diekirch (Luxembourgish: Dikrech) is a canton in the north of Luxembourg. Neither the canton, town, nor commune of Diekirch should be confused with the former district of Diekirch, one of three administrative units in Luxembourg abolished in October 2015. It borders Germany.

== Administrative divisions ==
Diekirch Canton consists of the following ten communes:

- Bettendorf
- Bourscheid
- Diekirch
- Erpeldange-sur-Sûre
- Ettelbruck
- Feulen
- Mertzig
- Reisdorf
- Schieren
- Vallée de l'Ernz

== History ==
Shortly after the creation of the canton of Diekirch, the census of 1796 counted a population there of 7,418.

It had only two communes with more than 1,000 inhabitants: Diekirch (1,160) and Ettelbruck (1,040). All other communes had fewer than 500 inhabitants each.

== Mergers ==
- On 1 January 2006, the former commune of Bastendorf (from Diekirch Canton) was merged with the former commune of Fouhren (from Vianden Canton) to create the commune of Tandel (in Vianden Canton). The law creating Tandel was passed on 21 December 2004. Therefore, Diekirch Canton ceded 24.44 km^{2} of land to Vianden Canton.
- On 1 January 2012, the former communes of Ermsdorf and Medernach (both from Diekirch Canton) were merged to create the commune of Vallée de l'Ernz. The law creating the Vallée de l'Ernz was passed on 24 May 2011.

== Population ==
Historical population

Year	Pop.	±%
1821	10,343	—
1851	16,112	+55.8%
1900	16,588	+3.0%
1910	16,930	+2.1%
1922	16,305	−3.7%
1935	16,462	+1.0%

Year	Pop.	±%
1947	15,656	−4.9%
1960	16,760	+7.1%
1970	18,754	+11.9%
1981	20,931	+11.6%
1990	22,416	+7.1%
2000	25,279	+12.8%

Year	Pop.	±%
2005	26,577	+5.1%
2010	28,191	+6.1%
2015	31,024	+10.0%
2020	33,782	+8.9%
2021	33,944	+0.5%

Source data
