= Feulen =

Feulen Feelen (Luxembourgish)
- Commune
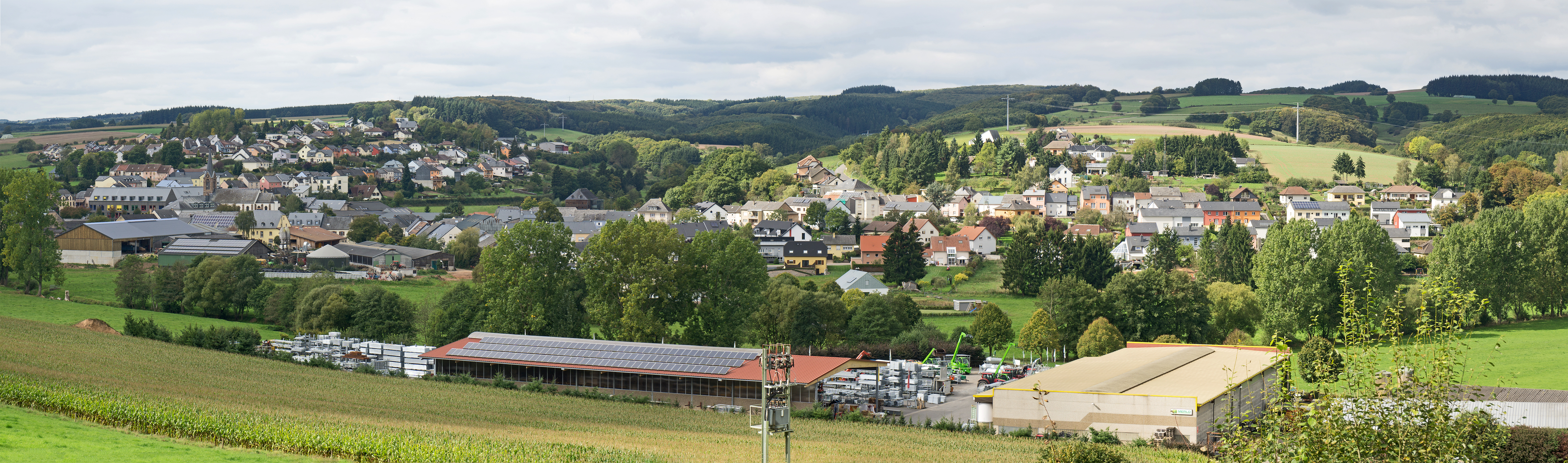
- Niederfeulen

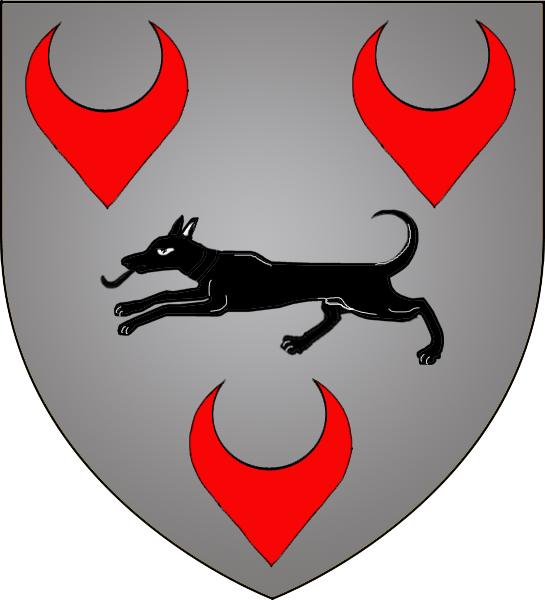
- Coat of arms

- Map of Luxembourg with Feulen highlighted in orange, and the canton in dark red
- Coordinates: 49.85°N 6.05°E
- Country: Luxembourg
- Canton: Diekirch

Government
  - Mayor: Fernand Mergen

Area
  - Total: 22.76 km^{2} (8.79 sq mi)
  - Rank: 43rd of 100
- Highest elevation: 488 m (1,601 ft)
  - Rank: 22nd of 100
- Lowest elevation: 259 m (850 ft)
  - Rank: 62nd of 100

Population (2025)
  - Total: 2,435
  - Rank: 66th of 100
  - Density: 107.0/km^{2} (277.1/sq mi)
  - Rank: 66th of 100
- Time zone: UTC+1 (CET)
  - Summer (DST): UTC+2 (CEST)
- LAU 2: LU0000606
- Website: feulen.lu

Feulen (German pronunciation: [ˈfɔʏlən]; Luxembourgish: Feelen) is a commune in central Luxembourg. It is part of the canton of Diekirch, which is part of the district of Diekirch. The commune's administrative centre is Niederfeulen.

Towns within the commune include Niederfeulen and Oberfeulen.

== Population ==
Historical population

Year	Pop.	±%
1821	874	—
1851	1,207	+38.1%
1900	947	−21.5%
1910	932	−1.6%
1922	928	−0.4%
1935	861	−7.2%

Year	Pop.	±%
1947	827	−3.9%
1960	729	−11.9%
1970	723	−0.8%
1981	1,003	+38.7%
1990	1,175	+17.1%
2000	1,313	+11.7%

Year	Pop.	±%
2005	1,465	+11.6%
2010	1,572	+7.3%
2015	1,793	+14.1%
2020	2,224	+24.0%
2021	2,263	+1.8%

Source data
