= Schieren =

- Commune
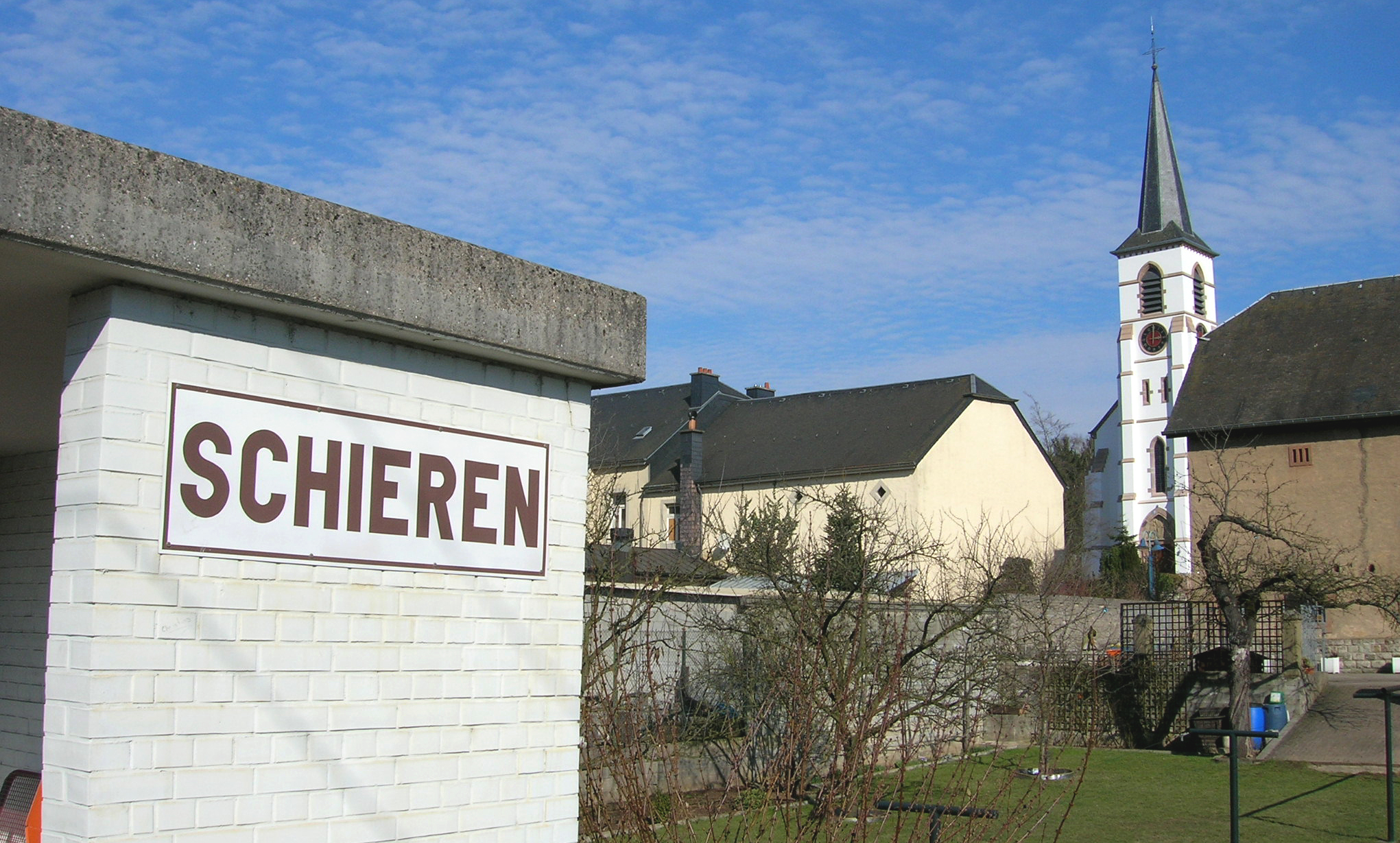
- Schieren train station and church

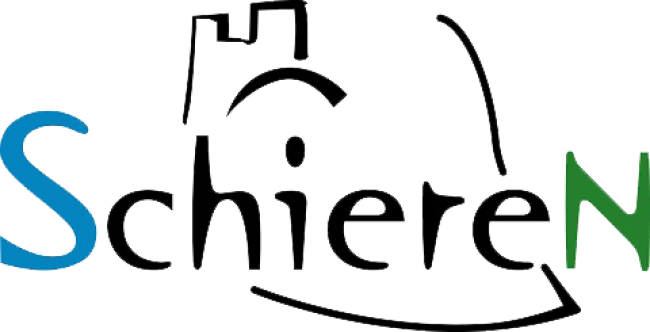
- Coat of arms Brandmark

- Map of Luxembourg with Schieren highlighted in orange, and the canton in dark red
- Coordinates: 49.8333°N 6.1°E
- Country: Luxembourg
- Canton: Diekirch

Government
  - Mayor: Jean-Paul Zeimet

Area
  - Total: 10.41 km^{2} (4.02 sq mi)
  - Rank: 94th of 100
- Highest elevation: 515 m (1,690 ft)
  - Rank: 15th of 100
- Lowest elevation: 198 m (650 ft)
  - Rank: 24th of 100

Population
  - Total: 2,172
  - Rank: 79th of 100
  - Density: 208.6/km^{2} (540.4/sq mi)
  - Rank: 42nd of 100
- Time zone: UTC+1 (CET)
  - Summer (DST): UTC+2 (CEST)
- LAU 2: LU0000609
- Website: schieren.lu

Schieren (German pronunciation: [ˈʃiːʁən]) is a commune and town in central Luxembourg. It is part of the canton of Diekirch.

Schieren is served by a railway station, and the commune encompasses the hamlet of Birtrange, which contains Birtrange castle.

Schieren was formed on 1 July 1850, when it was detached from the commune of Ettelbruck, along with the commune of Erpeldange. The law forming Schieren was passed on 22 January 1850.

In 1894, Schieren established a fire station with five volunteer firefighters. It contains a church.

== Population ==
Historical population

Year	Pop.	±%
1821	520	—
1851	905	+74.0%
1900	804	−11.2%
1910	809	+0.6%
1922	790	−2.3%
1935	759	−3.9%

Year	Pop.	±%
1947	754	−0.7%
1960	845	+12.1%
1970	965	+14.2%
1981	1,173	+21.6%
1990	1,241	+5.8%
2000	1,407	+13.4%

Year	Pop.	±%
2005	1,367	−2.8%
2010	1,531	+12.0%
2015	1,847	+20.6%
2020	2,039	+10.4%
2021	2,073	+1.7%

Source data
