= STATEC =

National statistics agency of Luxembourg

The Institut national de la statistique et des études économiques (STATEC) is the government statistics service of Luxembourg. It was created in its current form by a July 2011 law, and is headquartered in Belval since 2024, after moving from the Kirchberg district of Luxembourg City.
