= History of rail transport in Luxembourg =

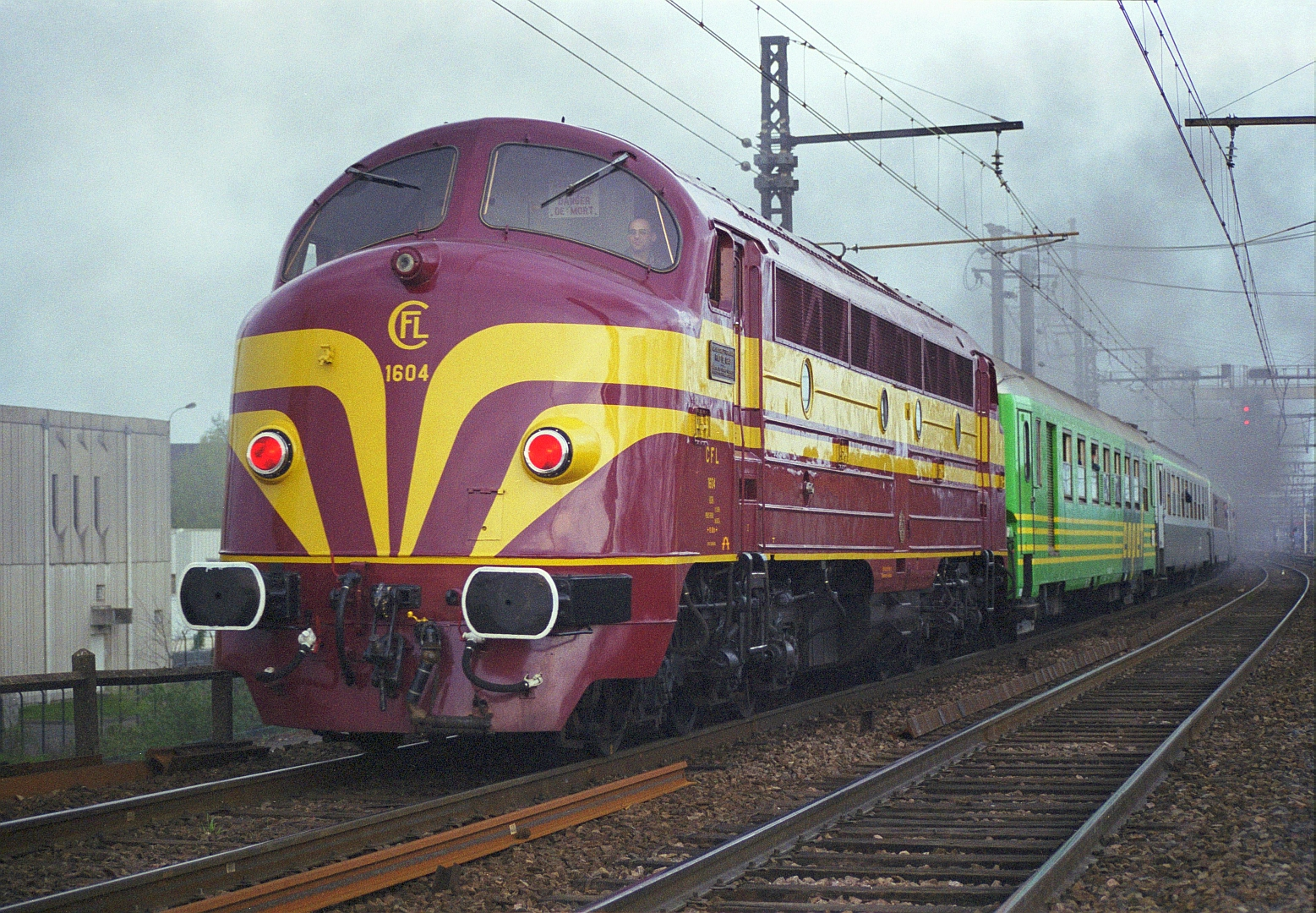
A preserved CFL NOHAB class 1600 diesel locomotive with a train at Villeneuve-Saint-Georges, France

The history of rail transport in Luxembourg began in 1846 and continues to the present day.

== Origins ==
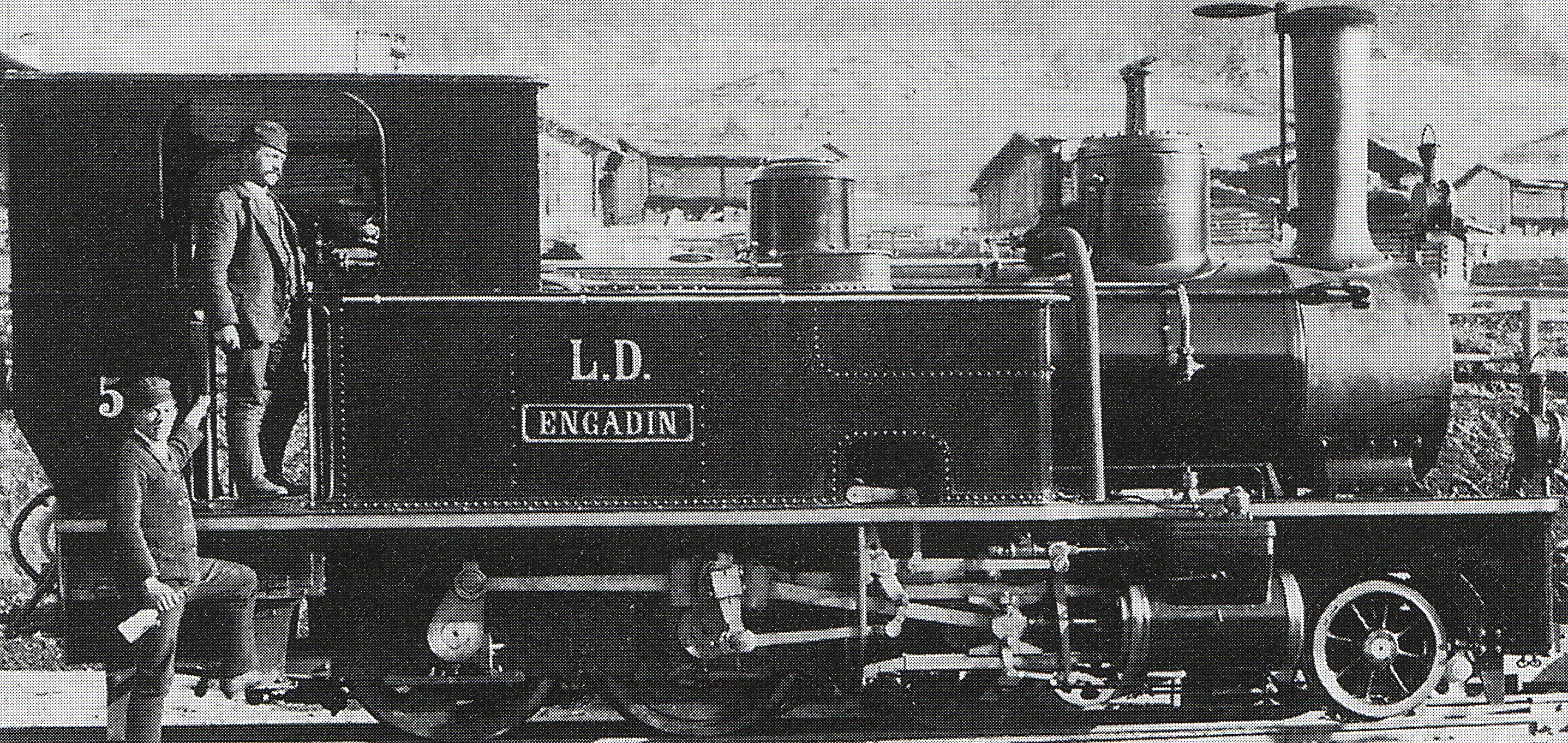
A Luxembourgish locomotive pictured in 1889

The Grand Duchy of Luxembourg belonged to the German Confederation from 1815 to 1866 as a sovereign state. The relevant treaties still remained in force after 1871 when the German Empire was founded: Luxembourg therefore remained a member of the German Zollverein and connected to the German Empire through a currency union, until 1918. However, until 1890, so in the period during which most of the railways were built, the Grand Duchy was connected in personal union to the Dutch monarchy. Luxembourg's neighbour, Belgium, had definitively split off from the Netherlands in 1839 with the Treaty of London. Close economic ties continued to remain between Belgium and Luxembourg.

The first half of the 19th century was strongly marked by the steam engine, the invention that allowed humans to multiply, to an unexpected extent, their capacities for production, construction, and transportation, without depending on seasonal and atmospheric conditions. Thus, the need was felt for the Grand Duchy, and especially its capital city, to be connected to neighbouring countries by the new revolutionary mode of transportation which was the railway.

Ideas for building the lines to serve the Grand Duchy were abundant at the time, and the plans and projects that emerged were not free from bias or hidden agendas.

In addition to the Luxembourgish ties with Belgium, there were British economic interests in the area. Thus, British companies and banks also studied the feasibility of railway projects that affected Luxembourg from around 1845. The Grand Duchy's finances and its financial sector were at the time too weak, to undertake railway projects itself. There was the additional problem that the city of Luxembourg was a German federal fortress, and that therefore the Prussian military stationed there prohibited the construction of a railway into the city itself.

In 1827 a company, the Société anonyme de Luxembourg was founded in Brussels with the goal of building a navigable canal between the Maas and Moselle, a project that was already abandoned in 1830 however. From this company, and supported by British creditors, the Great Luxembourg Company / Grande Compagnie Luxembourgoise was founded in 1845, with the goal of connecting Luxembourg to its three neighbouring countries through railways. A preliminary agreement was signed on 4 June 1846, but did not immediately bear fruit, as the government and the company could not reach a final agreement. A few years later, by the law of 7 January 1850, the government was authorized to negotiate with private companies. The law provided a guarantee of a minimum interest of 3%.

In 1853, the Luxembourger François-Émile Majerus, who had worked for a long time in Mexico as an engineer and geologist, published a pamphlet showing the great economic advantages for agriculture, trade and the Luxembourgish steel industry which would result from a Luxembourgish railway network connected to neighbouring countries.

In this context, in the mid-1850s it was necessary to take a decision. In 1854, the Compagnie du chemin de fer de Paris à Strasbourg, which would later become the Compagnie des Chemins de fer de l’Est (EST), opened the Metz–Thionville railway line. A decision had to be taken how it should be extended to the north: via Luxembourg or via Longwy.

In the second half of the 19th century, there were three diverging transport interests in Luxembourg:

- Luxembourg City, the capital and largest city of the country, lies at the crossroads of several European routes. In terms of railways, the railway station of Luxembourg City today forms the main intersection.
- The steel industry – primarily in the south and south-west of the country – required efficient railway lines for the transport of ore, coal and steel.
- The country as a whole, despite its small size, had a need for countrywide transportation, which could not be met by a network centred on Luxembourg City; also because the city is located in the south of the country's geographical centre.

To resolve these transport needs and interests, which were not all compatible with each other, several railway companies came into being, which each pursued their own goals.

With the northwards expansion of the Thionville line, the Longwy route was in the interest of Belgian and Lotharingian industrialists, who wanted to link up iron ore mines and the steel industry in the French-Luxembourgish border area. Due to strategic military interests of the French government, however, the decision was taken to extend the Thionville line towards Luxembourg. Prussia on the other hand wanted a railway connection towards the east, to its own sovereign territory.

The Grande Compagnie Luxembourgoise had talks in 1853 with the Compagnie du chemin de fer de Paris à Strasbourg over the construction of railways in Luxembourg, and the Crédit immobilier de Paris bank declared its willingness to finance the project. (The Compagnie du chemin de fer de Paris à Strasbourg became the Compagnie des Chemins de fer de l’Est (EST) that same year.) With this, the extension of the cross-border segment of the Thionville–Luxembourg line seemed secure. Since EST was pursuing the competing project in parallel of a railway towards Belgium circumventing Luxembourg, however, the Grande Compagnie Luxembourgoise turned its back on railway construction in Luxembourg.

== Guillaume-Luxembourg ==
=== Company ===
In this context, M. Daval approached the Luxembourgish government about building three railway lines, which were to lead from Luxembourg to Arlon, Thionville and Trier. Daval had founded a company for this purpose with the banker Adolphe Favier and the engineer Stéphane Jouve. After the Luxembourgish government realised that the Grande Compagnie Luxembourgoise had pulled out, EST was being reluctant due to the competing project via Longwy, and another, Prussian company that had been in talks could not bring up the funds, it started talks with Daval. This resulted in an agreement on 9 November 1855, through which the company was awarded the name of the Dutch King and Grand Duke of Luxembourg William II, as the Société royale Grand-Ducale de Guillaume-Luxembourg (German: Königlich-großherzogliche Wilhelm-Luxemburg-Gesellschaft), also Compagnie Guillaume-Luxembourg or just Guillaume-Luxembourg (GL). While the company paid the deposit, construction did not begin yet. There was then a further contract on 2 March 1857, when French funds had been secured. In the end, the Guillaume-Luxembourg lines were financed exclusively through French capital. The company became embroiled in a financial scandal, and was forced to ask the Luxembourgish government for help.

=== Construction of lines ===
It therefore took until 11 August 1859, before the route to Thionville went into operation, as Luxembourg's first railway line. On that same day, a "pleasure train" with 600 passengers travelled to Paris. The same year, on 4 and 5 October, the route to Arlon was opened.

In the following years until 1867, Guillaume-Luxembourg opened the vast majority of the main lines of Luxembourg's network, which are still operational today.

Four main lines were built:

- Luxembourg – Bettembourg – France (11 August 1859)
- Luxembourg – Kleinbettingen – Belgium (15 September 1859)
- Luxembourg – Wasserbillig – Germany (29 August 1861)
- Luxembourg – Ettelbrück (21 July 1862), Ettelbrück – Kautenbach (15 December 1866), Ettelbrück – Diekirch (16 November 1862), Kautenbach – Troisvierges – Belgium (20 February 1867)

Two smaller lines were built to transport the iron ore to the blast furnaces at Dommeldange:

- Bettembourg – Esch-Alzette (came into service 23 April 1859)
- Noertzange – Rumelange – Ottange (1 June 1860)

Due to the opposition of the local population, the lines were not laid through villages and vineyards.

The law of 7 May 1856 mandated the construction of a new direct railway line to Saarbrücken, without going via Trier. This project, the law notwithstanding, was never executed.

=== Conflicts ===
Operationally, the situation was challenging. There was a conflict between the GL and the Grande Compagnie du Luxembourg, which operated railways in the adjacent Belgian province of Luxembourg. The GL's lines on the other side of the border were operated by the EST railway company, which had French interests behind it. Additionally, the political situation was complex, caught between Prussia, France, and Belgium (which was supported by British interests). In 1867, the Luxembourg Crisis occurred: Napoleon III attempted to purchase Luxembourg from King William III of the Netherlands. The public in the Grand Duchy and other areas of the German Confederation protested vehemently against the plan. The crisis culminated in the Second Treaty of London in 1867, in which Luxembourg was declared "permanently neutral" on one hand, but on the other hand, the fortress of Luxembourg was abandoned and dismantled.

In 1862 the operation of the lines from Kleinbettingen to Luxembourg and from Luxembourg to Wasserbillig passed, once again, from the EST to the Belgian Grande Compagnie du Luxembourg, as part of an exchange for the operation on the Luxembourg–Spa railway line. However, in 1869, the EST took back control of the two aforementioned lines.

Another problem was that the network that had developed until 1867 led from larger cities abroad to the city of Luxembourg, in a star shape. However, the Luxembourg steel industry wanted connections between its supply and production sites and also found the tariffs of the GL to be too high. Out of this dissatisfaction, the initiative emerged to establish the Prince-Henri railway network.

Guillaume-Luxembourg was administered until 10 May 1871 by the French Compagnie des chemins de fer de l'Est. After this, the Prussians, having just won the Franco-Prussian War and subsequently having annexed the Alsace, transferred the French rights into a new Compagnie EL (Reichseisenbahn Elsass-Lothringen).

=== Operation ===
Guillaume-Luxembourg was purely a financing, construction, and railway infrastructure company that never operated a public railway itself. Even before the completion of the first line on 6 June 1857, the operation of the lines it built was leased to the Compagnie du chemin de fer de Paris à Strasbourg, later known as the Compagnie des Chemins de fer de l'Est (EST), which acted as a railway operator here.

After the Franco-German War, the EST, since it now lay in the German Imperial Territory of Alsace-Lorraine, became the property of the German Empire, which reorganised this network into the Imperial Railways in Alsace-Lorraine (EL). After persistent resistance from Luxembourg, the EL then, under a treaty, took over the operating rights of the EST on the GL in Luxembourg in 1872.

From 1919 onwards, the Administration des chemins de fer d’Alsace et de Lorraine (AL) took over the operating rights on the GL network, succeeding the EL, after Alsace and Lorraine had reverted to France following the First World War. In 1938, all rights of the AL were transferred to the newly established SNCF. During the Second World War, Germany occupied the Grand Duchy of Luxembourg and integrated all railways there into the Deutsche Reichsbahn. Since the establishment of the state-owned Société Nationale des Chemins de Fer Luxembourgeois (CFL) in 1946, the former GL network has been part of the CFL.

== Luxembourg City ==
On 30 October 1858, the founding stone of the first railway station in Luxembourg City was laid down. The Fortress of Luxembourg was at this point still garrisoned by the Prussian military, and for strategic reasons the railway line could not go into the fortress. Therefore, the new station was built on the Bourbon Plateau outside of the Fortress. The Prussian military authorities demanded that it be built out of wood. The fact that the station was built outside the fortress, 1,500 metres (4,900 ft) away from the city centre, on the other side of the Pétrusse valley, is the reason for the construction of the city's viaduct, the Passerelle and the Adolphe Bridge.

On 4 October 1859, at the celebrations for the first train to depart from Luxembourg, the patriotic song "Feierwon" was sung for the first time on the steps of the town hall. This became the unofficial national anthem.

As part of the celebrations on 4/5 October, the first stone of the Passerelle bridge was laid down.

The first train from the city to Hesperange forest, Prince Henry was a passenger, was pulled by a horse. The track construction from Hesperange to the city had not progressed enough to accommodate a steam locomotive.

== Prince-Henri network ==
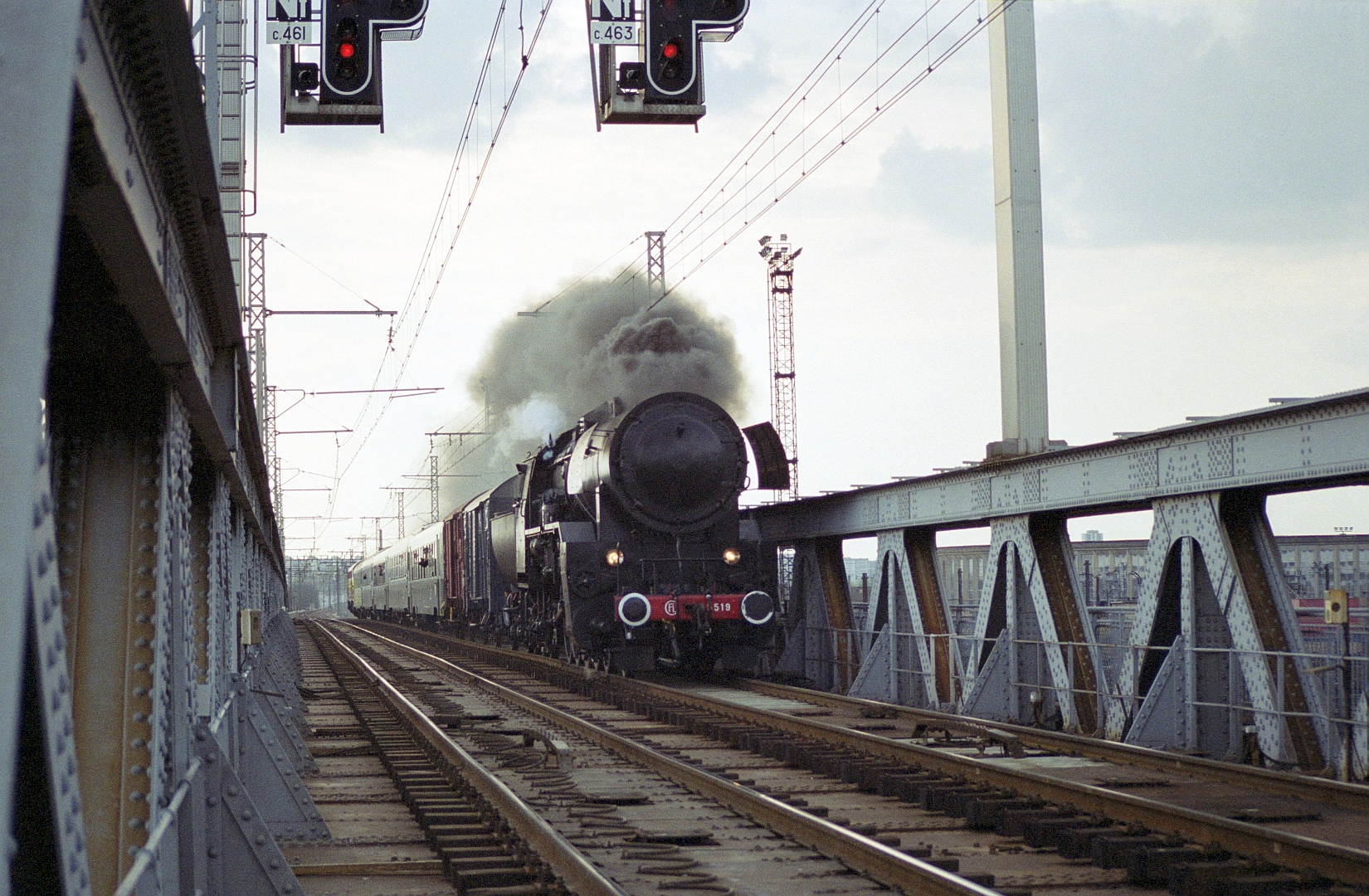
CFL type BR 42 locomotive

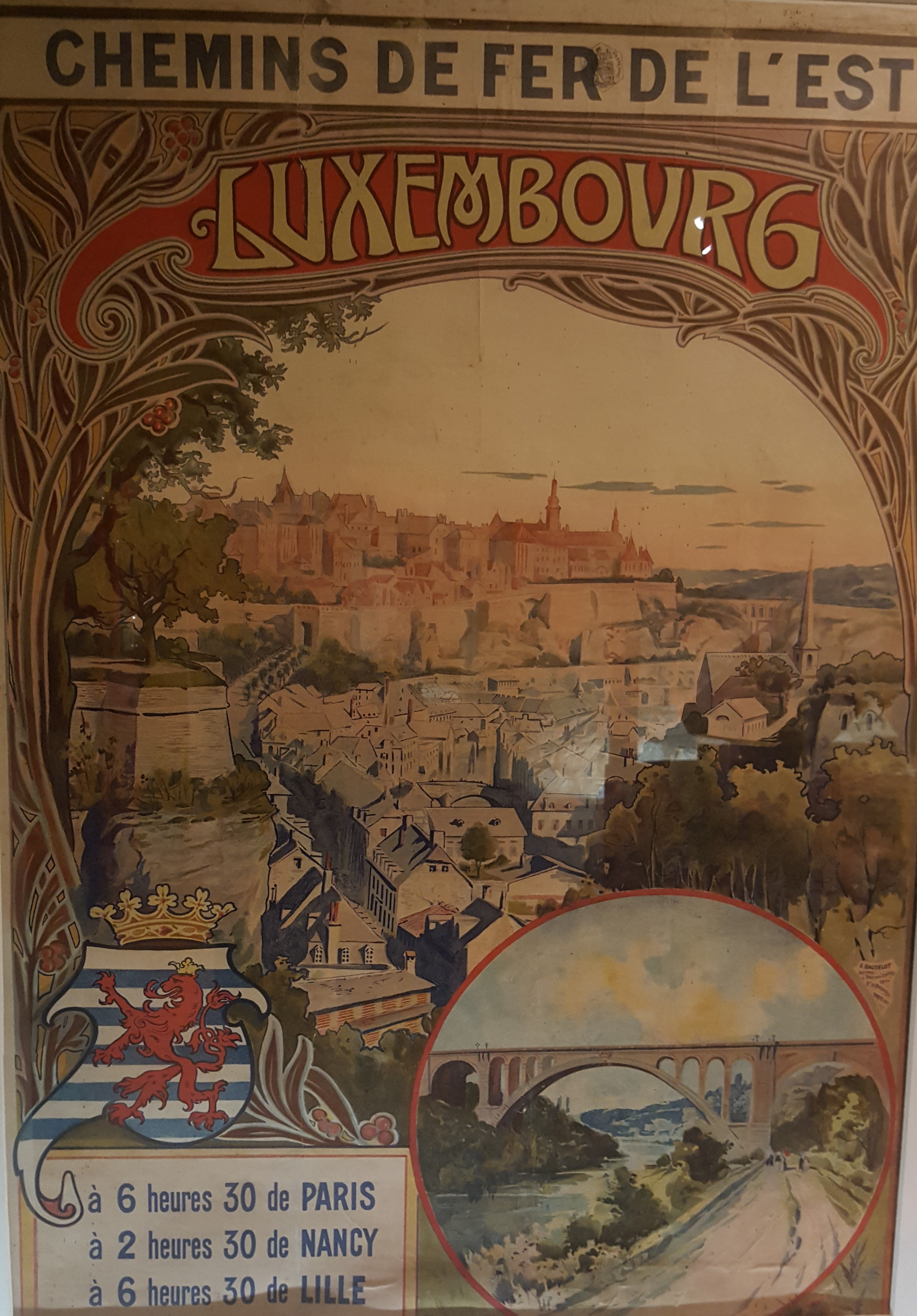
Luxembourg railway poster

From 1864 several prominent figures put their support behind the idea of constructing a second railway line (Gürtelbahn). These included Eugène Guyot, a Brussels book printer; Simon Philippart, a Brussels banker; and François Majerus, Luxembourgish engineer. It was to go from Wasserbillig, along the Sauer, via Ettelbrück, along the Attert and the Belgian border, via Kleinbettingen to Pétange, where the centre of the new network was to be located. From Pétange it was to go on to Esch-Alzette.

On 19 March 1869, to realise this project, a law created the Société des chemins de fer Prince-Henri ("Prince Henry Railway Company"). This was named after King Grand Duke William III's brother, Prince Henry of the Netherlands, who had been the Lieutenant-Governor, representing William, in Luxembourg since 1850. Despite strong resistance from the competing Guillaume-Luxembourg company in conjunction with their railway company, EST, concessions were eventually granted for the Prince-Henri company. This company established a network of lines, primarily radiating from Pétange, and included another line, which — albeit utilising sections of the GL network — extended in a wide arc north of the city of Luxembourg and along the eastern border of the Grand Duchy from Diekirch via Echternach and Wasserbillig to Grevenmacher. The network was gradually opened between 1873 and 1881, with some later additions.

In the spring of 1870, work started in two places: the line Esch-Alzette – Pétange – Steinfort and the line Pétange – Fond-de-Gras. At the same time the line Clemency – Autelbas – Arlon was started.

From 1 August 1873, the first trains ran on the new PH network:

- Esch-Alzette – Pétange (16,02 km)
- Pétange – Steinfort (18,36 km)
- Hagen – Kleinbettingen (1,11 km).

1873–1874: From Diekirch, along the Sauer, a new project was started, the Ettelbrück-Wasserbillig line. 50 km in length, in order to avoid tunnels it went all the way through the Sauer valley up to Wasserbillig. On 20 October 1873 the Diekirch – Echternach line was inaugurated in the presence of Prince Henry, in Echternach. It was only fully functional from 8 December 1873, as there was still some work to be done. On 20 May 1874 the Echternach-Wasserbillig line started work.

In 1874, the double track Pétange – Athus line was built, to create another connection to Belgium.

During 1874–1877, the customers of the ironworks were losing interest in Luxembourgish cast iron. Due to its high phosphorus contents, it was too brittle. Its price fell from 140 to 45 francs per tonne. The first crisis was unavoidable, and 40% of the ironworkers lost their jobs. The Prince-Henri company went bankrupt.

As the Prince-Henri was not fulfilling its obligations stated in the state concessions, on 3 March 1877 the state revoked the concessions and temporarily took over the railway operations. The shareholders of the Société des chemins de fer Prince-Henri, which was dissolved, regrouped and founded the Société luxembourgoise des chemins de fer et minières Prince-Henri ("Luxembourgish Prince Henry Railway and Mine Company") in the same year. This new company took over the concessions that had been granted to the first Prince-Henri company by the state, still with the abbreviation "PH".

Sidney Gilchrist Thomas and his cousin Percy Gilchrist invented a new procedure to produce steel from the phosphorus cast iron. This created a boom for Luxembourgish steel-working, and new steelworks and rolling mills sprung up.

The new PH company made efforts to finish construction of their lines. On the Steinfort - Ettelbrück section, the longest tunnel of Luxembourg (700 m) was dug and the line was in use from 20 April 1880.

- 1880: The first express train Luxembourg – Paris was scheduled and went via Esch-Alzette – Pétange – Athus.
- 1 June 1881: The Kautenbach – Wiltz, line, built by PH, started service.
- 30 December 1883: PH opened a Red Lands railway station with two platforms, near Esch-Alzette. The company Cockerill supplied two locomotives to park the carriages.
- 26 April 1886: The following concessions for narrow-gauge lines were awarded:
  Noerdange - Martelange
  Diekirch - Vianden
- 27 June 1886: The connection with France via Rodange – Mont-Saint-Martin – Longwy was realised.
- 1 July 1888: After the Kautenbach – Wilz line (PH) was extended to the Belgian border, where it was connected to the Belgian network, there was now a connection to Bastogne. A disadvantage was that this line was only accessible via the GL network (Ettelbrück – Kautenbach – Troisvierges line). All reserve materials needed in Wiltz, had to be brought in from Pétange.
- 5 November 1891: The Echternach – Wasserbillig line was extended to Grevenmacher. PH built a station in Wasserbillig with a dining room, waiting rooms and staff accommodation. Since 1987 the building was used as offices by the commune of Mertert.
- 1895 - 1900: PH made huge profits. In this period, various elaborate buildings were constructed in Pétange: a large rail station, a headquarters, a block of social housing for workers, five villas as accommodation for the director and the engineers. The street where these villas stood (and one still stands) is still named Härewee ("Gentlemen Street"). Other stations on this route were also enlarged.

On 8 August 1900, the new Pétange – Dippach – Luxembourg line opened. This was the point of PH's greatest expansion.

During 1901–1907, the air brake, invented by Westinghouse, was introduced in Luxembourg, as with other European railways. The "brakers" could be done away with.

On 4 November 1904, an industrial narrow-gauge line (1.000 mm) started operating from Grundhof to the stone quarries on the hill over Dillingen. In November 1911 it was extended to Beaufort and made accessible to passengers.

At Pétange, a "Machine fixe" was built. Wells were dug, the minerals removed from the water, and the water pumped to a water tower by the station. This water was then used in the steam engines.

The "Prince" in 1904 had about 200 km (120 mi) of railway line (of which 10 km on Belgian territory), 46 steam locomotives (6 of them for narrow-gauge lines), 68 passenger carriages and 24 baggage vans.

In May 1919, PH was made by the state to exploit the vicinal train lines: the Luxembourg – Echternach (Chareli) line and the Bettembourg – Aspelt line.

On 29 May 1927, the railway received competition. The Minette tram of the "Syndicat des Tramways Intercommunaux du Canton d'Esch" (TICE), founded in 1914 by the communes of Esch-Alzette, started service.

From 1929 onwards, profits slowly decreased until 1940.

== Narrow-gauge railways ==
The Luxemburg narrow-gauge railways served the country's local and regional transportation needs. They were decommissioned in the decade following the Second World War. While the Guillaume-Luxembourg and the Prince-Henri companies had constructed the high-traffic routes by around 1880, parts of the country with less traffic remained without rail connections. The two major companies were not interested in investing in these areas. Thus, the Luxembourg government enlisted a subsidiary of the Swiss Locomotive and Machine Works (SLM), which initially built the Luxembourg–Remich and Cruchten–Fels lines as narrow-gauge railways in metre gauge and put them into operation in 1882. From this beginning, the Société anonyme des chemins de fer secondaires luxembourgois ("Luxembourg Secondary Railway Company") emerged, but it showed no interest in constructing further lines. However, it did take over the operation of the Aspelt–Bettembourg and Luxembourg–Echternach narrow-gauge railways.

In 1887, another company was established for the construction and operation of secondary railways in Luxembourg with Luxembourgish and Belgian shareholders, called the Société anonyme des chemins de fer cantoneaux luxembourgois ("Company of Luxembourgish Cantonal Railways"). Economically, this only functioned because the state subsidised the company through the granting of mining concessions. In this way, three lines were established:

- Wasserbillig–Grevenmacher with a standard gauge, opened in 1891, but already in 1890, the company sold its rights to this line to the Prinz-Henri railway
- Nœrdange–Martelange (metre-gauge)
- Diekirch–Vianden (metre-gauge)

== World War I and interwar period ==
The illegal occupation of neutral Luxembourg by the German Empire at the beginning of World War I and the subsequent use of its railway network such as in Troisvierges on 1 August 1914, the de facto seizure of the Luxembourg railways by the victorious Allies, and the downfall of the EL, which had operated the GL routes, left behind an administrative chaos that took several years to sort out. It was concluded with a Franco-Luxembourgish treaty in 1925 – although some aspects remained subject to legal disputes until 1933 – establishing the status quo and confirming that the French Administration des chemins de fer d'Alsace et de Lorraine (AL), which succeeded the EL in the former Reichsland Elsaß-Lothringen, also assumed its rights and duties in Luxembourg.

== World War II and aftermath ==
On 10 May 1940, German troops invaded Luxembourg and confiscated the rail lines for use by the occupying army. In November 1941, Luxembourg was officially annexed by Nazi Germany. The Reichsbahn took over the running of the railways; some employees were subject to dismissal, moved to Germany or imprisoned.

All three entities, the GL with 209 km track length, the Prince-Henri line with 190 km and the narrow-gauge lines with 143 km (a total of 542 km) were annexed by the Deutsche Reichsbahn. On 1 December 1940 the Reichsbahndirektion Saarbrücken took over the management of the Prince-Henri line.

After the withdrawal of the Wehrmacht in 1944, the railway facilities, all railway depots, and most vehicles had been destroyed.

== Post-war history ==
After the liberation of the capital on 10 September 1944, Luxembourgish railways worked to open temporary service. The first trains to run were military transports. The first worker trains resumed service on 5 October 1944, bringing workers via the Attert line to Differdange, to the only steelworks that was still operating, where "Grey-beams" were being rolled, which were urgently needed by the US and for reconstruction.

To avoid a repetition of the chaotic conditions that had arisen after the First World War, the state took advantage of the situation that the three entities that had previously operated railways in the Grand Duchy had been unified under the Reichsbahn. On 17 April 1946, the Société Nationale des Chemins de Fer Luxembourgeois (CFL) was founded. The concessions of WL and PH were withdrawn by the law of 16 June 1947. The CFL existed on paper, but the Chamber of Deputies did not ratify the law until 4 June 1947. All Luxembourgish railway lines were given to the CFL for a term of 99 years. The Luxembourgish government owned 51%, and France and Belgium 24,5% each.

The situation resulted in the electrification of the network in the following decades initially taking place with two different systems: towards Belgium with the commonly used direct current of 3000 volts, and towards France with the alternating current of 25 kV / 50 Hz used there. This railway power is also used on the line to Germany, where there is a system changeover point to the German network (15 kV / 16 2/3 Hz) at Wasserbillig. The line towards Belgium was subsequently converted to 25 kV / 50 Hz. The narrow-gauge network was completely shut down. Today, CFL operates only 271 km, thus halving the network compared to pre-war levels.

On 28 September 1956, the era of the electric railway started, with the electrification of the transit route Kleinbettingen-border – Bettembourg-border via Luxembourg City.

== See also ==
- Rail transport in Luxembourg
- Société royale grand-ducale des chemins de fer Guillaume-Luxembourg
- Narrow-gauge railways in Luxembourg
- Trams in Luxembourg
- History of rail transport
