= Kayl railway station =

Railway station in Kayl, Luxembourg

Coordinates: 49°29′13″N 06°02′05″E

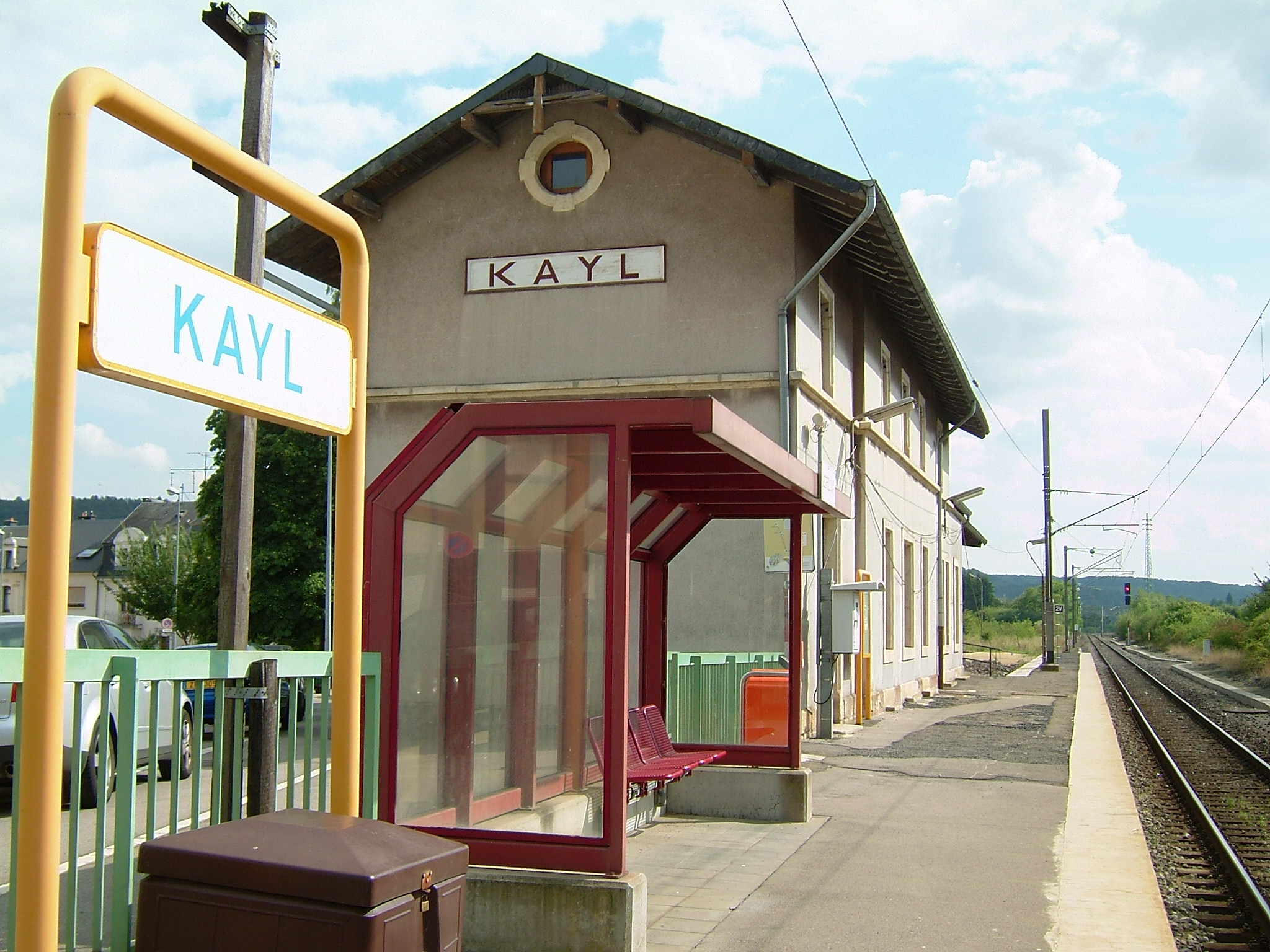
Kayl train station

Kayl railway station (Luxembourgish: Gare Keel, French: Gare de Kayl, German: Bahnhof Kayl) is a railway station serving Kayl, in south-western Luxembourg. It is operated by Chemins de Fer Luxembourgeois, the state-owned railway company.

The station is situated on Line 60, which connects Luxembourg City to the Red Lands of the south of the country. Kayl is the first stop on a branch line that, splitting from the main line at Noertzange, leads to Rumelange.

Preceding station	CFL	Following station
Noertzange Terminus	Line 60B	Tétange towards Rumelange
