= Tétange railway station =

Railway station in Tétange, Luxembourg

Coordinates: 49°28′32″N 06°02′06″E

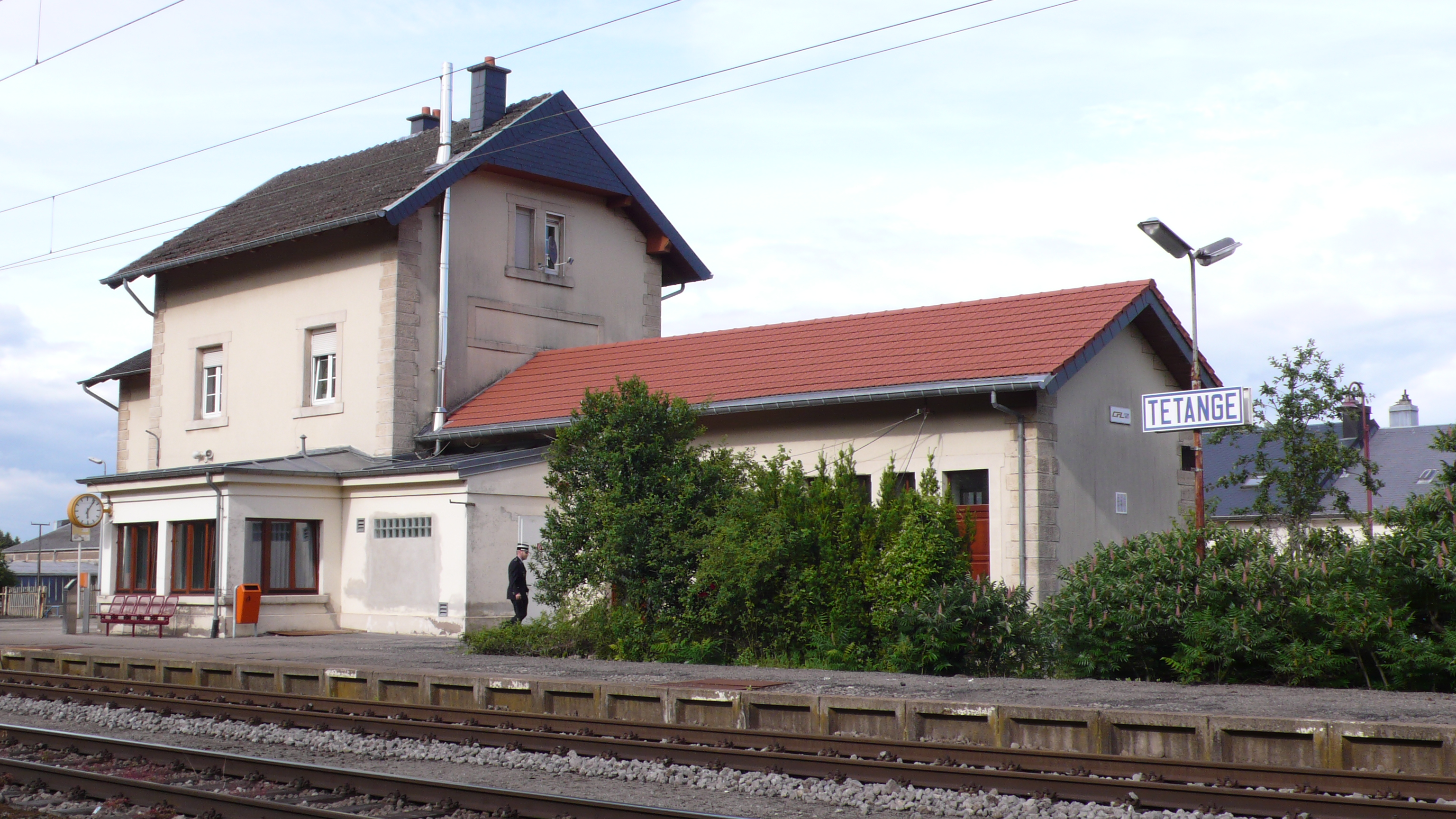
Téiteng station

Tétange railway station (Luxembourgish: Gare Téiteng, French: Gare de Tétange, German: Bahnhof Tetingen) is a railway station serving Tétange, in the commune of Kayl, in south-western Luxembourg. It is operated by Chemins de Fer Luxembourgeois, the state-owned railway company.

The station is situated on Line 60, which connects Luxembourg City to the Red Lands of the south of the country. Tétange is the second stop on a branch line that, splitting from the main line at Noertzange, leads to Rumelange.

As of 2022, it was the least used station in Luxembourg, with only 2,623 passengers that year.

Preceding station	CFL	Following station
Kayl towards Noertzange	Line 60B	Rumelange Terminus
