= Bettembourg =

Bettembourg Beetebuerg (Luxembourgish) Bettemburg (German)
- Commune
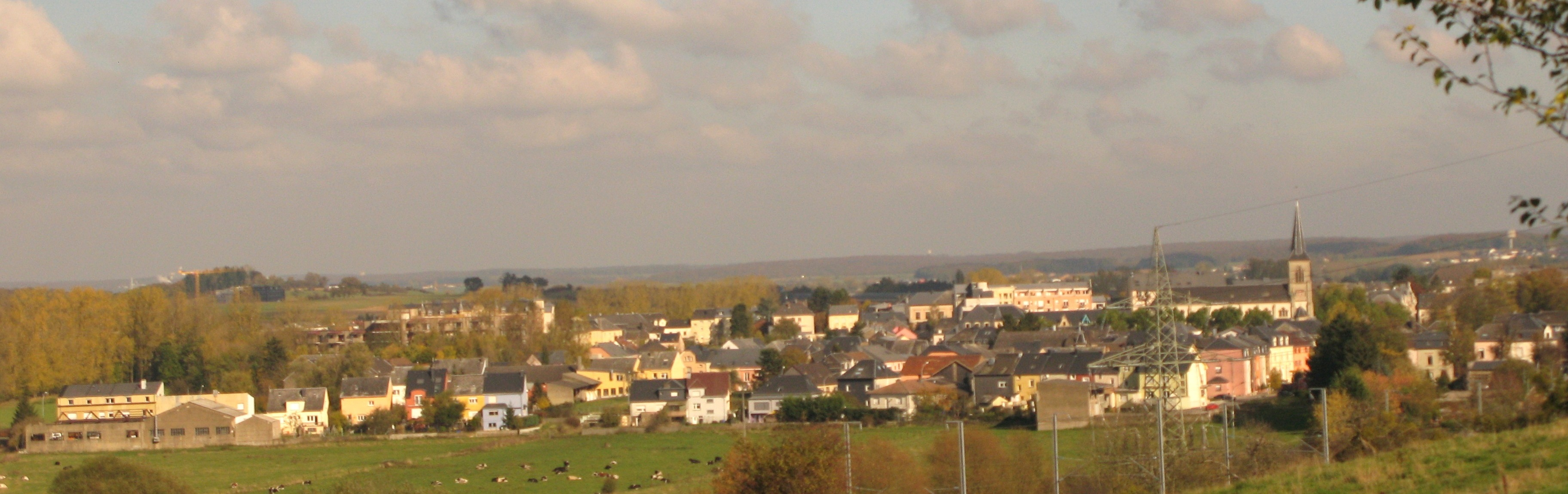
- Bettembourg seen from the Äppelbierg

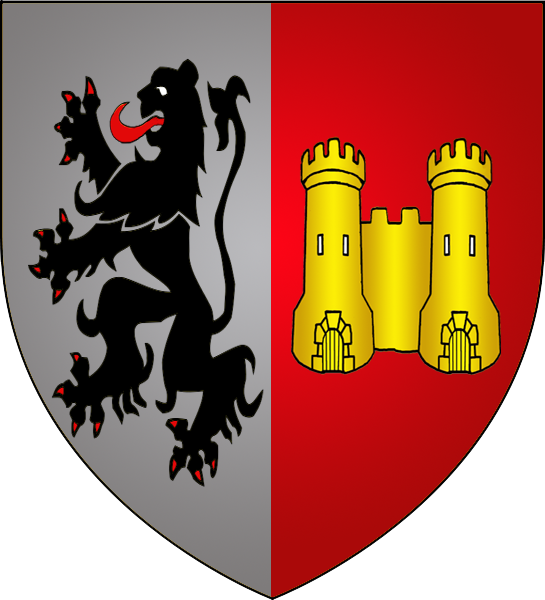
- Coat of arms

- Map of Luxembourg with Bettembourg highlighted in orange, and the canton in dark red
- Coordinates: 49.5167°N 6.1°E
- Country: Luxembourg
- Canton: Esch-sur-Alzette

Government
  - Mayor: Jean-Marie Jans (CSV)

Area
  - Total: 21.49 km^{2} (8.30 sq mi)
  - Rank: 49th of 100
- Highest elevation: 338 m (1,109 ft)
  - Rank: 88th of 100
- Lowest elevation: 267 m (876 ft)
  - Rank: 71st of 100

Population (2025)
  - Total: 11,628
  - Rank: 8th of 100
  - Density: 541.1/km^{2} (1,401/sq mi)
  - Rank: 18th of 100
- Time zone: UTC+1 (CET)
  - Summer (DST): UTC+2 (CEST)
- LAU 2: LU0000201
- Website: bettembourg.lu

Bettembourg (French pronunciation: [bɛtɑ̃buʁ]; Luxembourgish: Beetebuerg [ˈbeːtəbu̯əɕ]; German: Bettemburg [ˈbɛtm̩ˌbʊʁk]) is a commune and town in southern Luxembourg. The country's eighth-most populous commune, it is part of the canton of Esch-sur-Alzette.

As of September 2026, the town of Bettembourg, which lies in the east of the commune, has a population of 9,334. Other towns within the commune include Abweiler, Fennange, Huncherange, and Noertzange.

The Parc Merveilleux children's amusement park is located just outside Bettembourg. Bettembourg Castle, located in the centre of the town, has a history starting in 1733 when it was built as the residence of a farming family. Today it houses the offices and services of the local commune and acts as the town hall of Bettembourg.

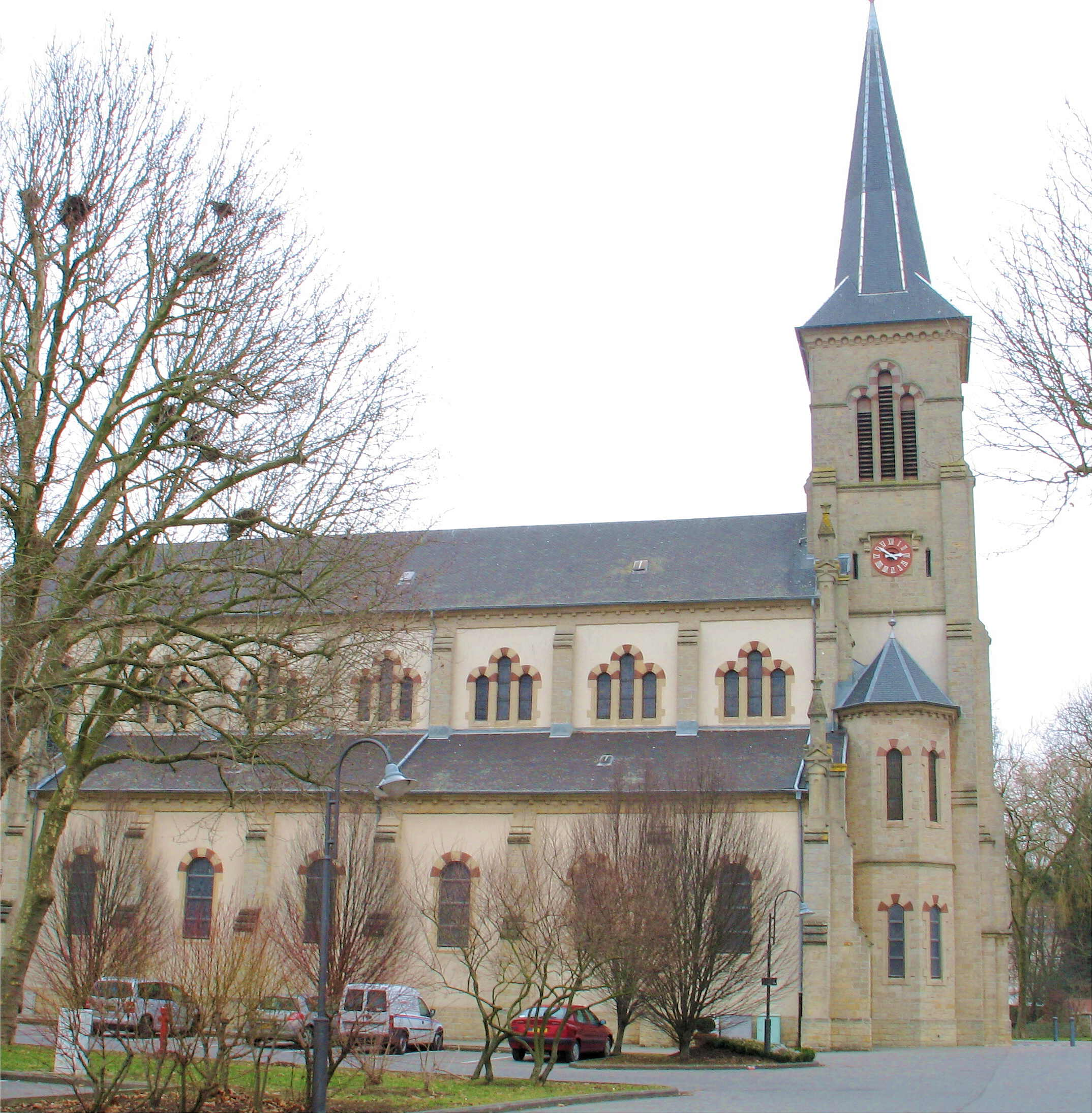
Bettembourg church

== Notable people ==
- Eugène Berger (1960–2020), a politician and in 1992 became the first Luxembourger to climb Mount Everest

== Transport ==
The commune is served by the Bettembourg and Noertzange railway stations on Line 60, the latter of which acts as a junction between the main line towards Esch-sur-Alzette and the smaller line to Rumelange.

== Twin towns ==
Bettembourg is twinned with:

- Flaibano, Italy
- Valpaços, Portugal

== Population ==
Historical population

Year	Pop.	±%
1821	1,022	—
1851	1,148	+12.3%
1900	2,203	+91.9%
1910	2,905	+31.9%
1922	3,430	+18.1%
1935	5,231	+52.5%

Year	Pop.	±%
1947	5,061	−3.2%
1960	5,877	+16.1%
1970	6,623	+12.7%
1981	7,131	+7.7%
1990	7,962	+11.7%
2000	9,179	+15.3%

Year	Pop.	±%
2005	9,271	+1.0%
2010	9,818	+5.9%
2015	10,178	+3.7%
2020	11,319	+11.2%
2021	11,374	+0.5%

Source data
