= Société royale grand-ducale des chemins de fer Guillaume-Luxembourg =

The Société royale grand-ducale des chemins de fer Guillaume-Luxembourg or "Royal Grand Ducal William-Luxembourg Railway Company" (also Compagnie Guillaume-Luxembourg or just Guillaume-Luxembourg or GL), was a Luxembourgish company, with French capital, created in 1857 to operate the 1855 concessions for the railway lines in the Grand-Duchy of Luxembourg. It constructed a set of lines that made up the railway network called the Guillaume-Luxembourg network. It was never an operating company, transferring this activity to a French company, the Compagnie des chemins de fer de l'Est, then to the Imperial Railways in Alsace-Lorraine in 1872, to the Administration des chemins de fer d'Alsace et de Lorraine in 1919, and then to the SNCF in 1938. During the German occupation in World War II, the Deutsche Reichsbahn operated the network until the liberation; the Guillaume-Luxembourg company ceased to exist as such in 1946 with the creation of SNCF.

== History ==
=== Creation ===
The joint-stock company, named the Société royale grand-ducale des chemins de fer Guillaume-Luxembourg, was authorised by the Grand-Ducal decree of 2 March 1857. This decree confirmed the creation of the company and validated its articles of association.

The eleven founding directors were:

- Jean-Guigne-Louis-Marie-Alexis Marquis d'Albon
- Gaspard-Théodore-Ignace de La Fontaine
- Joseph-Antoine-Alfred Prost
- Thérèse-Vendelin Jurion
- Pierre-André Arjo-Biétrix
- Alphonse de Boissieu
- Hippolyte-François-Louis Viscount Jaubert
- Numa Guilhou
- Jean-Marie Suchel
- Augustin-Marie-François de Roquenave d'Harmière Baron de Thuret
- Count de Vougy

The first president of the board of directors was the Marquis d'Albon, and the vice-presidents were Messrs. de La Fontaine and Prost.

The company received from Messrs. Louis-Antoine-Adolphe Favier, a merchant, and Stéphane Jouve, a public works contractor, both residing in Nancy, the transfer of railway concessions granted by the government of the Grand Duchy. This concerned four lines starting from the city of Luxembourg to head towards: the French border towards Thionville, the Belgian border towards Arlon, the Prussian border towards Trier, and the northern border of the Grand Duchy towards Weiswampach via Diekirch.

=== Treaty and operating agreements ===
On 6 June 1857, the Guillaume-Luxembourg Company signed a treaty with the Compagnie des chemins de fer de l'Est (Eastern Railway Company). It was agreed that the Chemins de fer de l'Est would undertake, for a period of 50 years, the operation of the lines granted to Guillaume-Luxembourg, in exchange for a share in the network's revenue; it would do so with its own equipment, personnel, and resources. Even before the opening of the first line, GL faced financial difficulties, leading the state to intervene and buy back the shares of Favier and Jouve.

The granted network then had a total length of 159km, consisting of four lines arranged in a star pattern with the city of Luxembourg as the centre:

- No. 1: 17.5km from Luxembourg to the French border, towards Thionville
- No. 2: 17.5km from Luxembourg to the Belgian border, towards Arlon
- No. 3: 34km from Luxembourg to the Prussian border, towards Trier
- No. 4: 90km from Luxembourg to the Prussian border, through Weiswampach, in the direction of Schleiden, Aachen, and Cologne (also known as the North line)

In 1862, a convention was signed for the construction of a line connecting Spa (in Belgium) to Ettelbruck and the operation of the concession of the Compagnie du chemin de fer de Pepinster à Spa. This line, completed in 1867, known as the "Grand-Ducal link-up," allowed for the connection of the Liège basin to Luxembourg, competing with the Ourthe Line of the Grande Compagnie du Luxembourg, while also opening up many Luxembourgish localities between Ettelbruck and Troisvierges. It was also operated by the Chemins de fer de l'Est, and its Belgian part was nationalised after 1872.

The conditions set on 6 June 1857, were modified by the treaty of 21 January 1868: henceforth, the Chemins de fer de l'Est took over the Guillaume-Luxembourg network by lease, in exchange for a fixed rent of 3,000,000 francs.

The Guillaume-Luxembourg network was directly affected by the Franco-German War of 1870, which saw France lose Alsace-Lorraine after its defeat. The treaty of 10 May 1871, between France and the German Empire specified that the Imperial Railways in Alsace-Lorraine would take over the management of the lines of the Chemins de fer de l'Est company in the annexed region, which became effective on 9 December 1871. However, it retained control of the Guillaume-Luxembourg network until 11 June 1872, even though it had become almost isolated from the rest, after which it was administered from Strasbourg.

Faced with the insistence of the Imperial Railways in Alsace-Lorraine, within the framework of the Zollverein, the Guillaume-Luxembourg company accepted on 16 July 1902, to affix its signature to an agreement that provided for its leasing in exchange for an annual fee of 3,866,400 gold francs. It thus lost all rights to oversee the management and operation of its railway infrastructure.

The Imperial Railways in Alsace-Lorraine was replaced by the Administration des chemins de fer d'Alsace et de Lorraine on 19 June 1919, when France regained Alsace-Lorraine and consequently its railway infrastructure, which the Compagnie des Chemins de Fer de l'Est did not wish to take back due to the German-standardised infrastructure (including right-hand driving and signaling).

The network was taken over by the SNCF upon its creation in 1938 but, during the Second World War, was integrated into the Deutsche Reichsbahn network by the German occupying forces. After the end of the conflict, it became part of the Société nationale des chemins de fer luxembourgeois ("Luxembourg National Railway Company)", the CFL, established in 1946.

== Railway network ==
Map of Luxembourgish railway lines in 1935. In red are the lines of Guillaume-Luxembourg

The Guillaume-Luxembourg network had various operators until the Second World War and was traversed by numerous types of rolling stock, as the operating companies never had specific equipment for the Luxembourg network:

- Compagnie des chemins de fer de l'Est (1859-1872)
- Imperial Railways in Alsace-Lorraine (1872-1919)
- Administration des chemins de fer d'Alsace et de Lorraine (1919-1937)
- SNCF (1938-1940)
- Deutsche Reichsbahn (1940-1944)
- Société nationale des chemins de fer luxembourgeois (since 1946)
- Belgian State Railways (1859-1926) and National Railway Company of Belgium (since 1926) for the line Luxembourg-Kleinbettingen-border

On the eve of World War II, the Guillaume-Luxembourg network consisted of the following lines:

- Luxembourg — Troisvierges — border line
- Ettelbruck — Diekirch line
- Luxembourg — Wasserbillig—border line
- Luxembourg — Berchem—Oetrange line
- Luxembourg — Kleinbettingen—border line
- Luxembourg — Bettembourg—border line
- Bettembourg — Esch-sur-Alzette line
- Bettembourg — Dudelange — Usines line
- Noertzange — Rumelange line
- Tétange — Langengrund line
- Esch-sur-Alzette — Audun-le-Tiche line
- Brucherberg — Scheuerbusch connection
- Troisvierges-Belgian border section of the Vennbahn

== See also ==
- Compagnie des chemins de fer de l'Est
- History of rail transport in Luxembourg
