= Passerelle (Luxembourg) =

Viaduct in Luxembourg City

Coordinates: 49°36′21″N 06°08′00″E

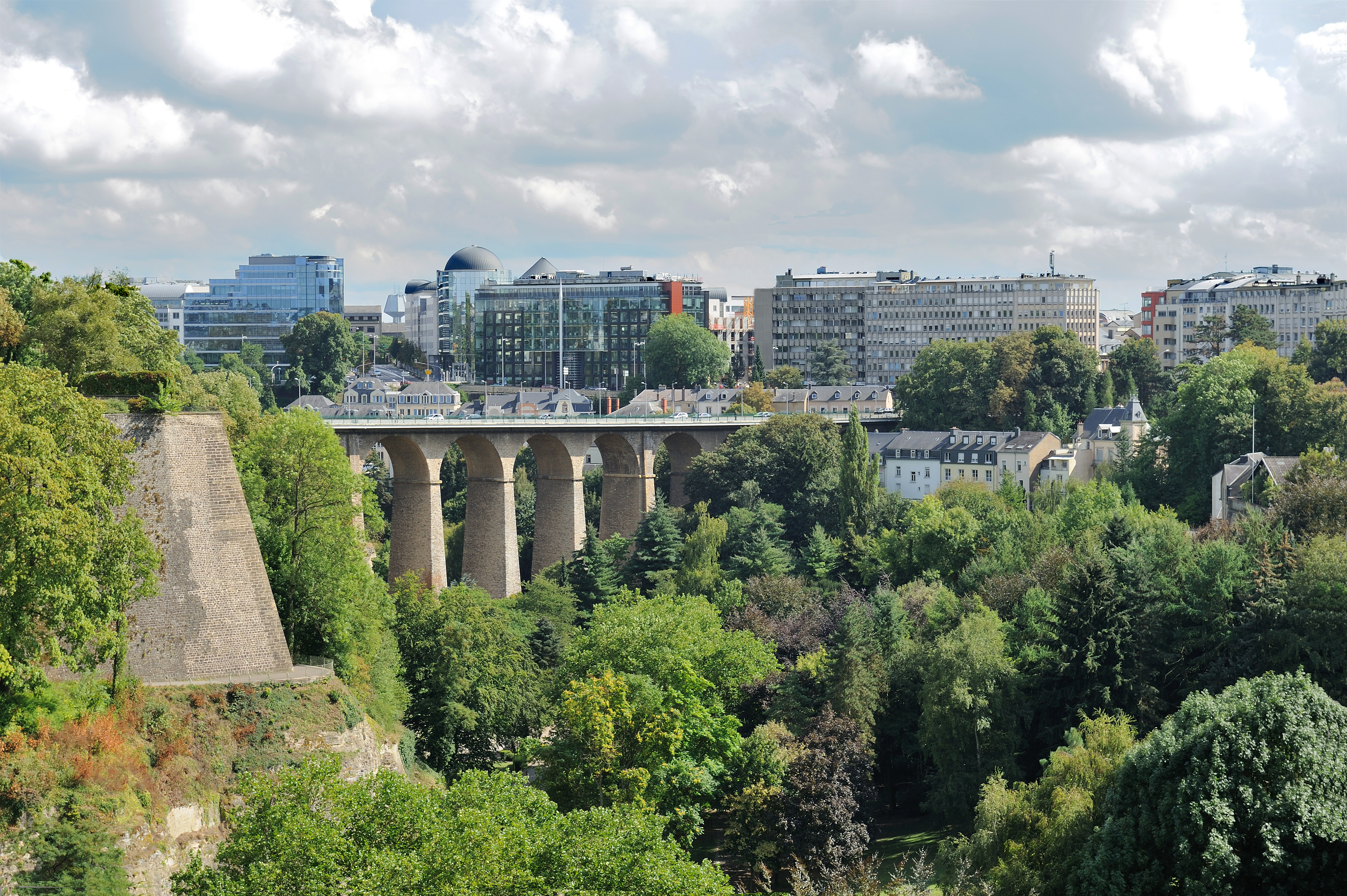
The Passerelle was constructed to carry traffic from the city centre over the Pétrusse valley

The Passerelle, also known as the Luxembourg Viaduct, is a viaduct in Luxembourg City, in southern Luxembourg. Nowadays it runs from the south into the city centre, Ville Haute, carrying road traffic across the Pétrusse valley and connecting Avenue de la Gare to Boulevard Franklin Delano Roosevelt. It is 290 m long, with 24 arches, and 45 m above the valley floor.

It is also known as the Old Bridge (Luxembourgish: Al Bréck, French: Vieux pont, German: Alte Brücke) by people from Luxembourg City. The 'new bridge' in this comparison is the Adolphe Bridge, which was built between 1900 and 1903.

The Passerelle was built between 1859 and 1861 to connect the city centre with Luxembourg's new railway station, which was located away from the city centre so as to not detract from the defensive capabilities of the city's fortress. It was conceived by the engineers Achille N. Grenier and Auguste Letellier, and built by the British company Waring Brothers.

Major improvements were carried out in 2018.

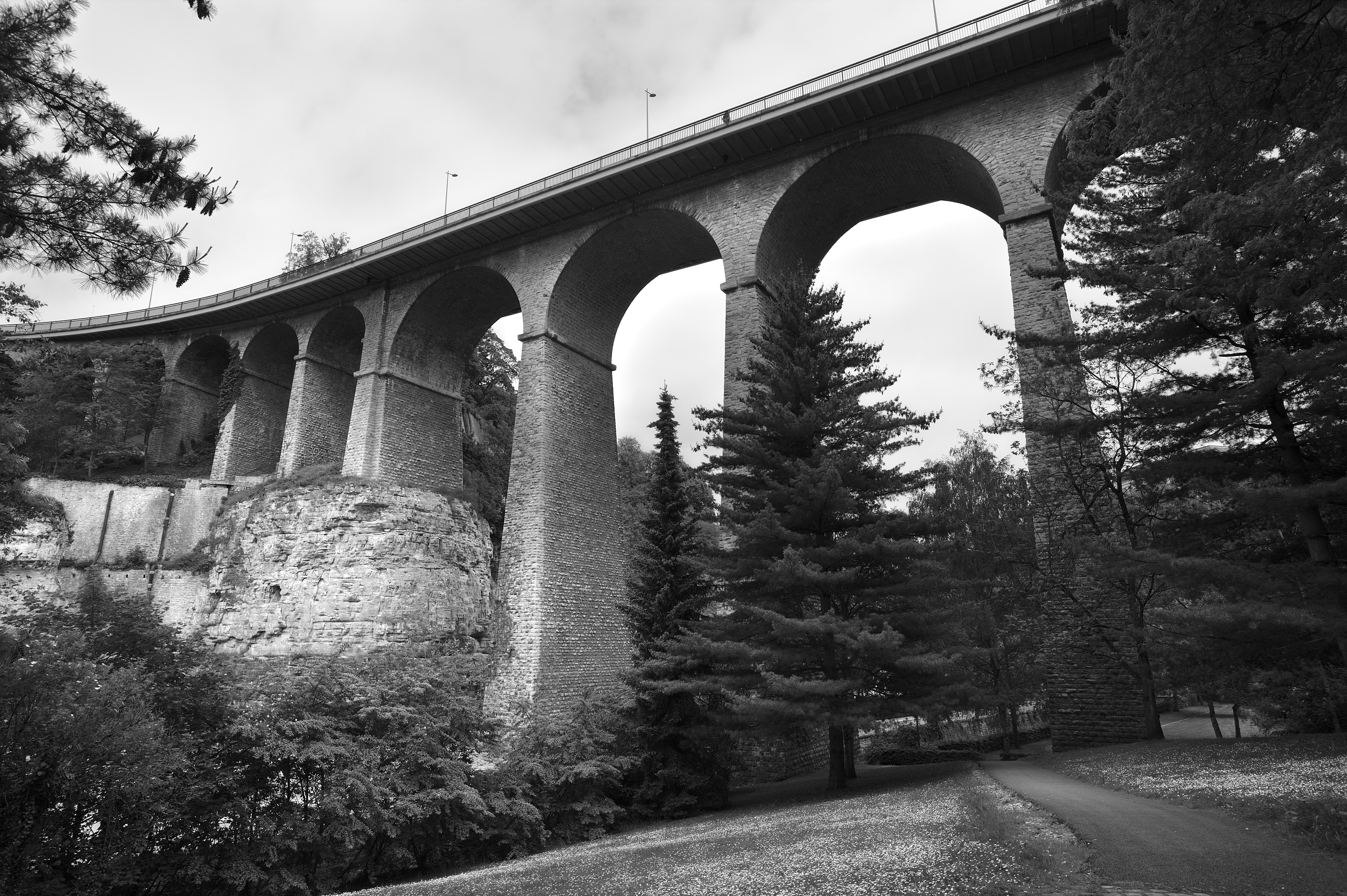
View of the Passerelle looking upwards from the Pétrusse valley

== See also ==
- History of rail transport in Luxembourg
