= Fennange =

Town in the commune of Bettembourg in Luxembourg

Coordinates: 49°31′N 6°05′E

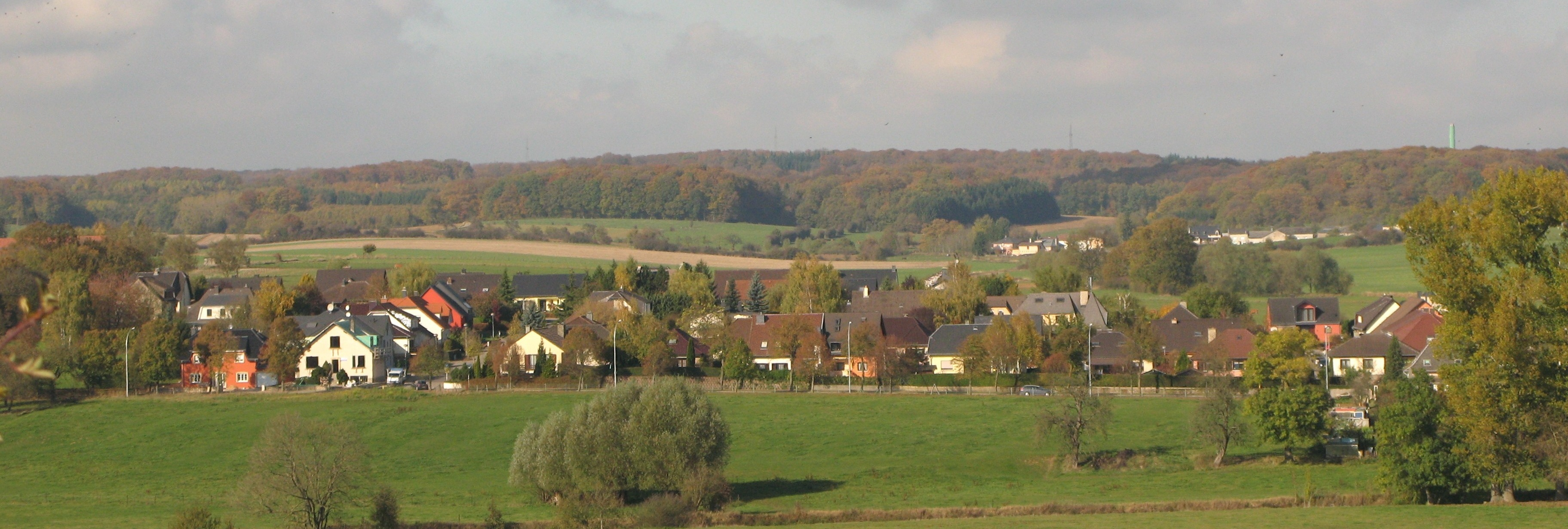
Fenneng seen from the south

Fennange (Luxembourgish: Fënnéng, German: Fenningen) is a small town in the commune of Bettembourg, in southern Luxembourg. As of September 2026, the town has a population of 433. A notable resident was the sculptor Maggy Stein.
