= Huncherange =

Town in Bettembourg, Luxembourg

Coordinates: 49°31′N 6°04′E

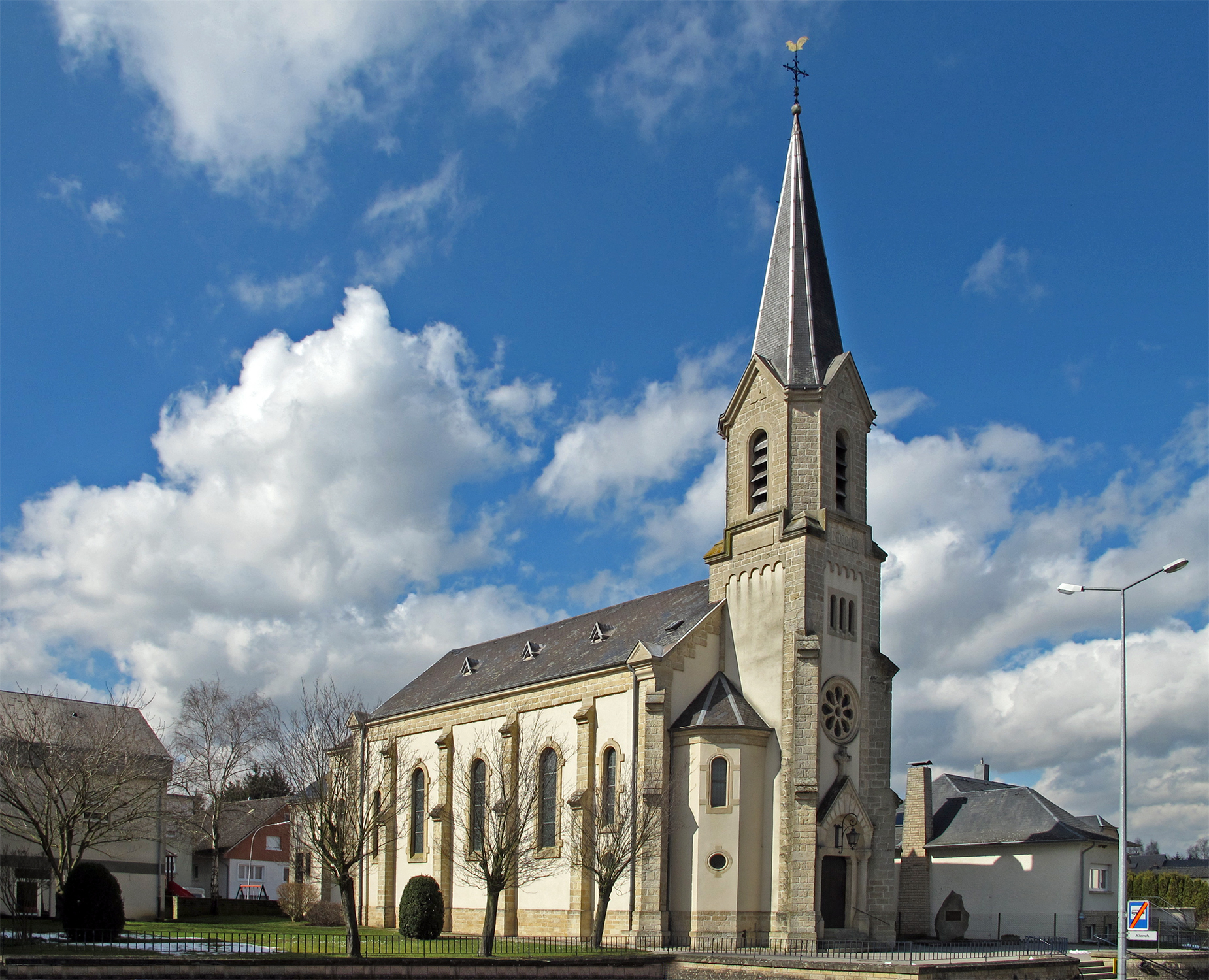
Huncherange church

Huncherange (Luxembourgish: Hëncheréng, German: Hüncheringen) is a small town in the commune of Bettembourg, in southern Luxembourg. As of September 2026, the town has a population of 715.

There is a watermill there, formerly the site of an old castle. According to a story recorded in the nineteenth century, the place is haunted by two women in white. The local church was built in 1903.
