= Waring Brothers =

- Company type: Private
- Industry: Civil engineering
- Founded: 1841
- Defunct: 1870s
- Fate: Wound-up
- Headquarters: London, England
- Key people: Charles Waring MP (Chairman)

Waring Brothers was an English company specialising in railway structures.

== History ==
The company was founded by Charles Waring, William Waring and Henry Waring in 1841 in York as a civil engineering business.

By 1853 the company was working for the Central Peninsular Railway Company in Portugal.

It went on to complete numerous railway structures including three viaducts in Luxembourg (including the Passerelle) and the station (but not the roof, which was tendered separately) of St Pancras in London.

== Major projects ==
Major projects included:

- The Dorset Central Railway, completed in 1858. Incorrect: Messrs Waring completed the line from Wimborne to Blandford St Mary's temporary station in October, 1860; they then laid the section from Blandford St Mary (including new town station) to Templecombe for the newly formed Somerset & Dorset Railway (formed 1862), completing it in August, 1863.
- The Ceylon Railway (ow known as Sri Lanka Railways), completed in 1859 (its wrong). Colombo to Ambepussa 35 miles of Ceylon Railway was completed by Faviell and the 1st train ran on 27 December 1864.
- The Pernambuco, Recife and San Francisco Railway, completed in 1860
- The Sicily Railway, completed in 1862
- The East Indian Railway, completed in 1862
- The Bristol Port Railway, completed in 1863
- The Honduras Railway, completed in 1870
- The Central Uruguay Railway, completed in 1871
- The Central do Brasil, Rio de Janeiro, 1884
- The Minas an Rio Railway,[Cruzeiro, São Paulo, Brasil], 1884

== Demise of the company ==
Charles Waring went into politics as Member of Parliament for Poole in 1865 after which time there were very few contracts entered into so it appears that the company was wound up in the early 1870s.
