= Maggy Stein =

Luxembourgish sculptor (1931–1999)

- Born: 13 April 1931; Luxembourg City, Luxembourg
- Died: 11 February 1999 (aged 67); Esch-sur-Alzette, Luxembourg
- Education: Lycée des arts et métiers
- Occupation: Artist
- Known for: Sculpture

Maggy Stein (13 April 1931 – 11 February 1999) was a Luxembourgish sculptor.

== Biography ==
Maggy Stein was born in the Luxembourg City in 1931 to the former college director Jean-Pierre Stein.

Stein attended Lucien Wercollier's sculpture course at the Lycée des arts et métiers from 1947 to 1949.

She then moved to the Belgian Congo with her first husband in 1950, where they lived for three years. The couple had three daughters, born between 1951 and 1959.

Stein returned to Wercollier's course in 1957 and began to exhibit her work in 1962.

From 1962, Stein organized exhibitions of her sculptures and participated in exhibitions with other artists, nationally and internationally. Stein worked in marble, bronze, stone, and occasionally wood.

Her monumental sculpture commissioned by the Luxembourg state is the 2.50-meter-tall (8.2 ft) travertine sculpture, known as La Grande Isis, which was put in place in 1980 to the south of Luxembourg City's Notre-Dame Cathedral. Two other sculptures of hers are on loan to the Court of Justice of the European Union, also in Luxembourg City.

Stein married sculptor Jean-Pierre Georg (1926–2004) in 1980 and they set up their workshops in the farm they restored in Fennange.

Stein died in Esch-sur-Alzette. She is remembered in the art gallery in Bettembourg Castle, which is named in her honour.
