= Parc Merveilleux =

Amusement park in Bettembourg, Luxembourg

Coordinates: 49.5115°N 6.1207°E

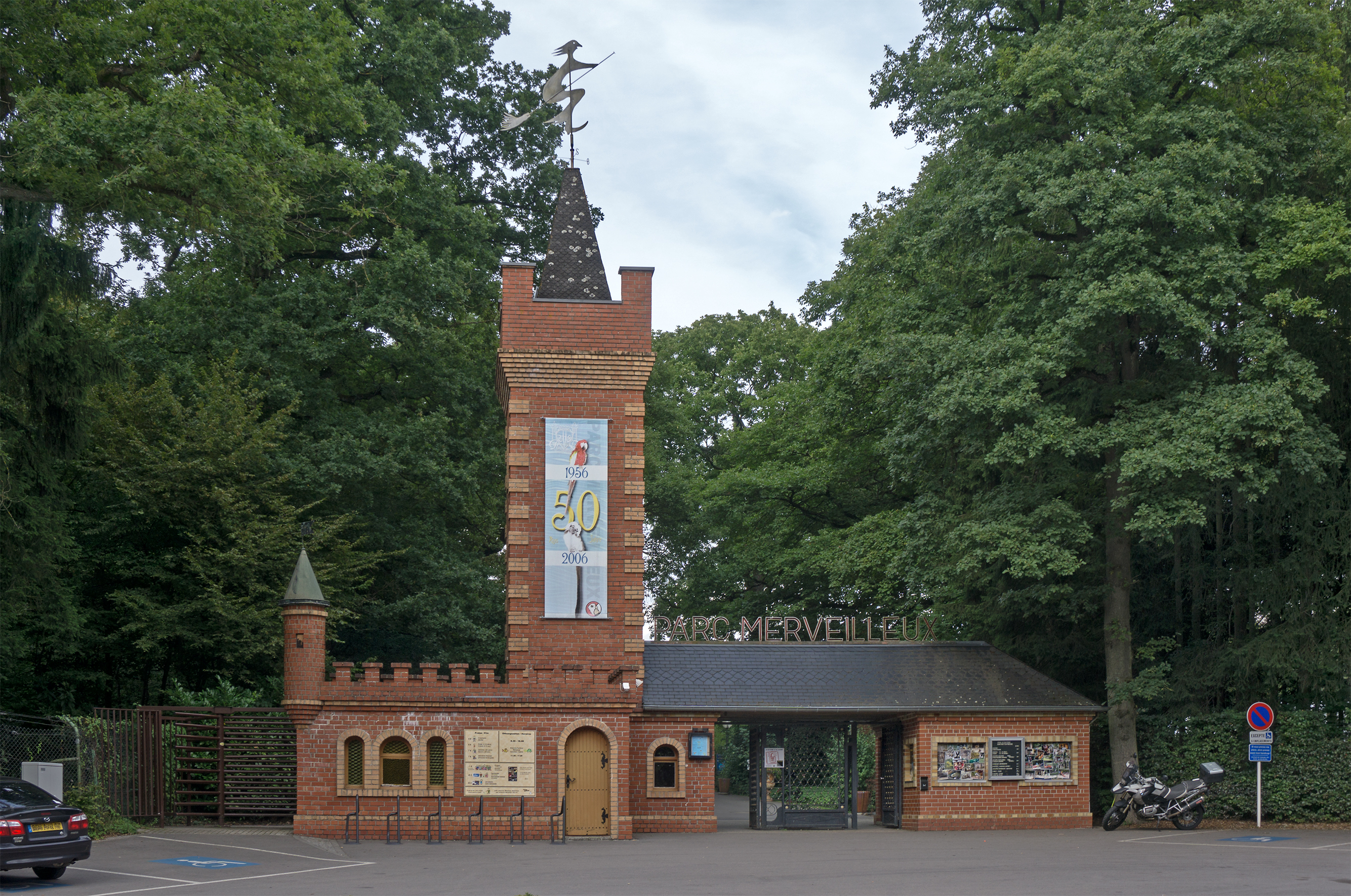
- Parc Merveilleux entrance in mid-August 2014
- Interactive map of Parc Merveilleux
- Location: Bettembourg, Luxembourg
- Opened: 17 July 1956
- Website: http://www.parc-merveilleux.lu

The Parc Merveilleux is an amusement park just east of Bettembourg in the south of Luxembourg. Designed above all for children, the park has a wide range of attractions including exotic birds, animals in their natural habitats, a pony ranch, a miniature railway, children's self-drive cars, adventure playgrounds, scenes from fairy tales, a restaurant and a cafeteria. The park is open every day from Easter to early October.
