= Rumelange railway station =

Railway station in Luxembourg

Coordinates: 49°27′37″N 06°01′57″E

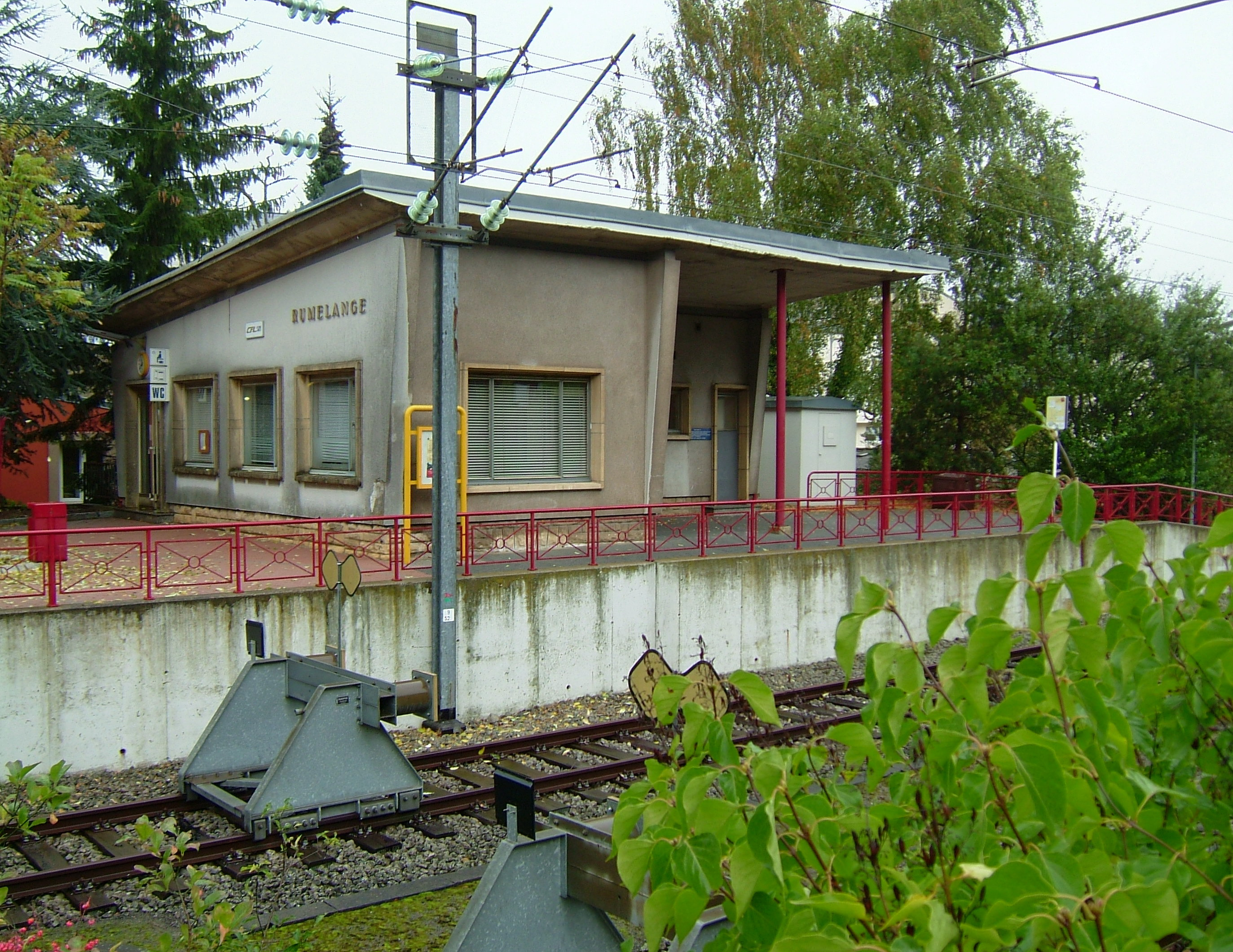
train station

Rumelange railway station (Luxembourgish: Gare Rëmeleng, French: Gare de Rumelange, German: Bahnhof Rümelingen) is a railway station serving Rumelange, in south-western Luxembourg. It is operated by Chemins de Fer Luxembourgeois, the state-owned railway company.

The station is situated on Line 60, which connects Luxembourg City to the Red Lands of the south of the country. Rumelange is the terminus of a branch line that separates from the main line at Noertzange.

Preceding station	CFL	Following station
Tétange towards Noertzange	Line 60B	Terminus
