= Administration des chemins de fer d'Alsace et de Lorraine =

French railway company

Administration des chemins de fer d'Alsace et de Lorraine (AL)
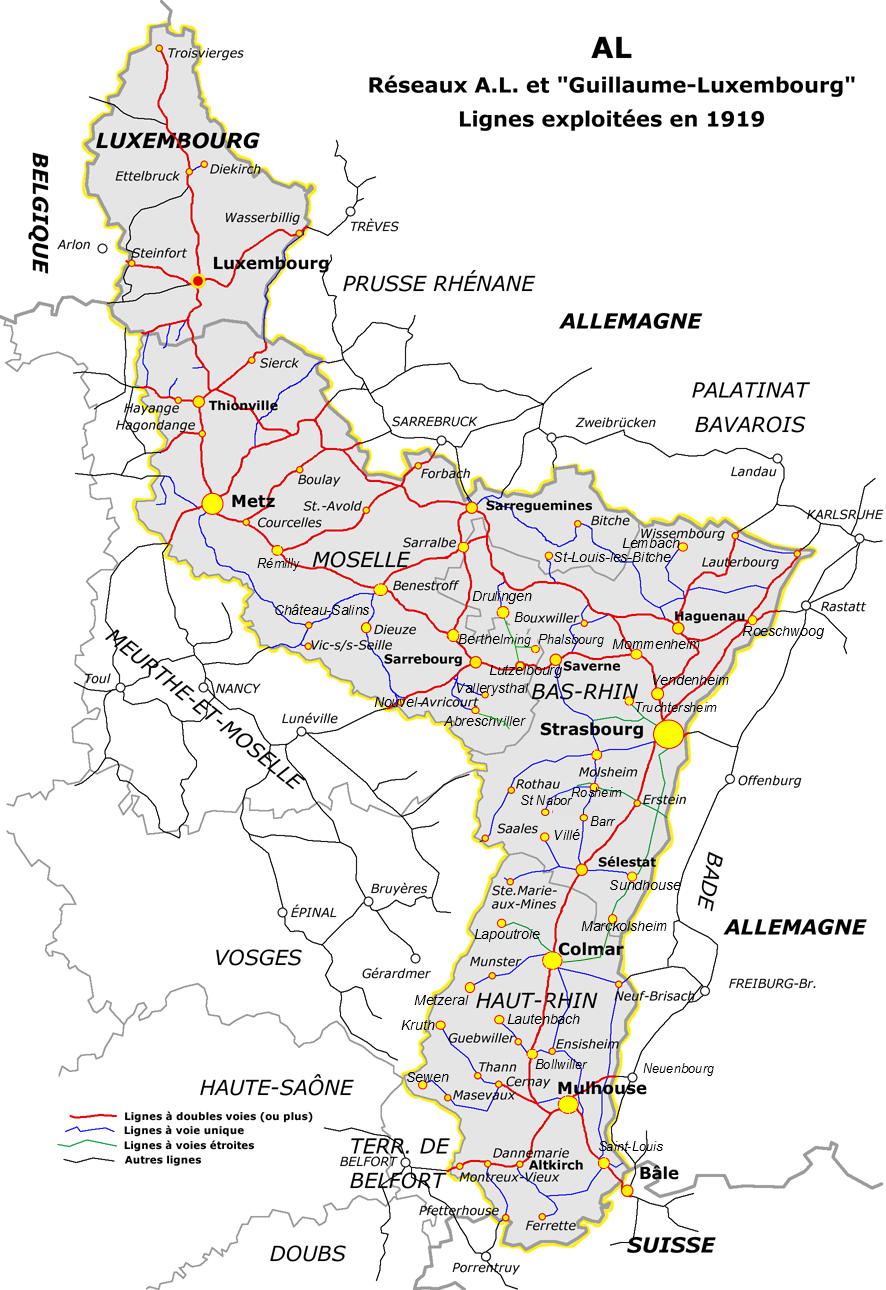
- Map of the Alsace-Lorraine and Guillaume-Luxembourg railways in 1919.

Overview
- Locale: Alsace, Moselle, Luxembourg
- Dates of operation: 1919–1938
- Predecessor: Reichseisenbahnen in Elsaß-Lothringen
- Successor: SNCF

Technical
- Track gauge: 1,435 mm (4 ft 8 1/2 in) standard gauge 1,000 mm (3 ft 3 3/8 in) metre gauge
- Length: 2,320 km (1,440 mi) (31 december 1937)

The Administration des chemins de fer d'Alsace et de Lorraine (French pronunciation: [administʁasjɔ̃ de ʃəmɛ̃ də fɛʁ dalzas e də lɔʁɛn]; English: Alsace and Lorraine Railway Administration) or AL was a rail transport company that ran the rail network for most of Alsace, Lorraine and Luxembourg between 1919 and 1937.

== Background ==
The network was part of the French private railway called the Chemins de fer de l'Est (EST) until 1871. With the Treaty of Frankfurt in 1871 after the Franco-Prussian War, their shareholders were compensated with 325 million francs by the French state and the railway was relinquished from France to the German Empire. The company operated as the national railway, called the Imperial Railways in Alsace–Lorraine.

== History ==
After the World War I the Alsace–Lorraine region became French again. On 19 June 1919, France created the second state national railway, which operated the rail network, from the railways they took over. On 30 November 1920, the AL was incorporated into the Ministry of Public Works. That was, however, a temporary plan, because the interested parties were debating three alternatives:

- A state railway
- A connection to the previous private railway (EST) (on the condition that the regional management would remain in Strasbourg)
- An independent railway (which was hoped to strengthen the regional economy)

In 1921, the government endorsed the option to pursue a connection to the EST and in 1922, because it was the cheapest option, it was decided to lease the state-owned portions of the network to the EST.

On 1 January 1938, the Alsace and Lorraine Railways were nationalised, as were the other main railway companies, to become part of SNCF.

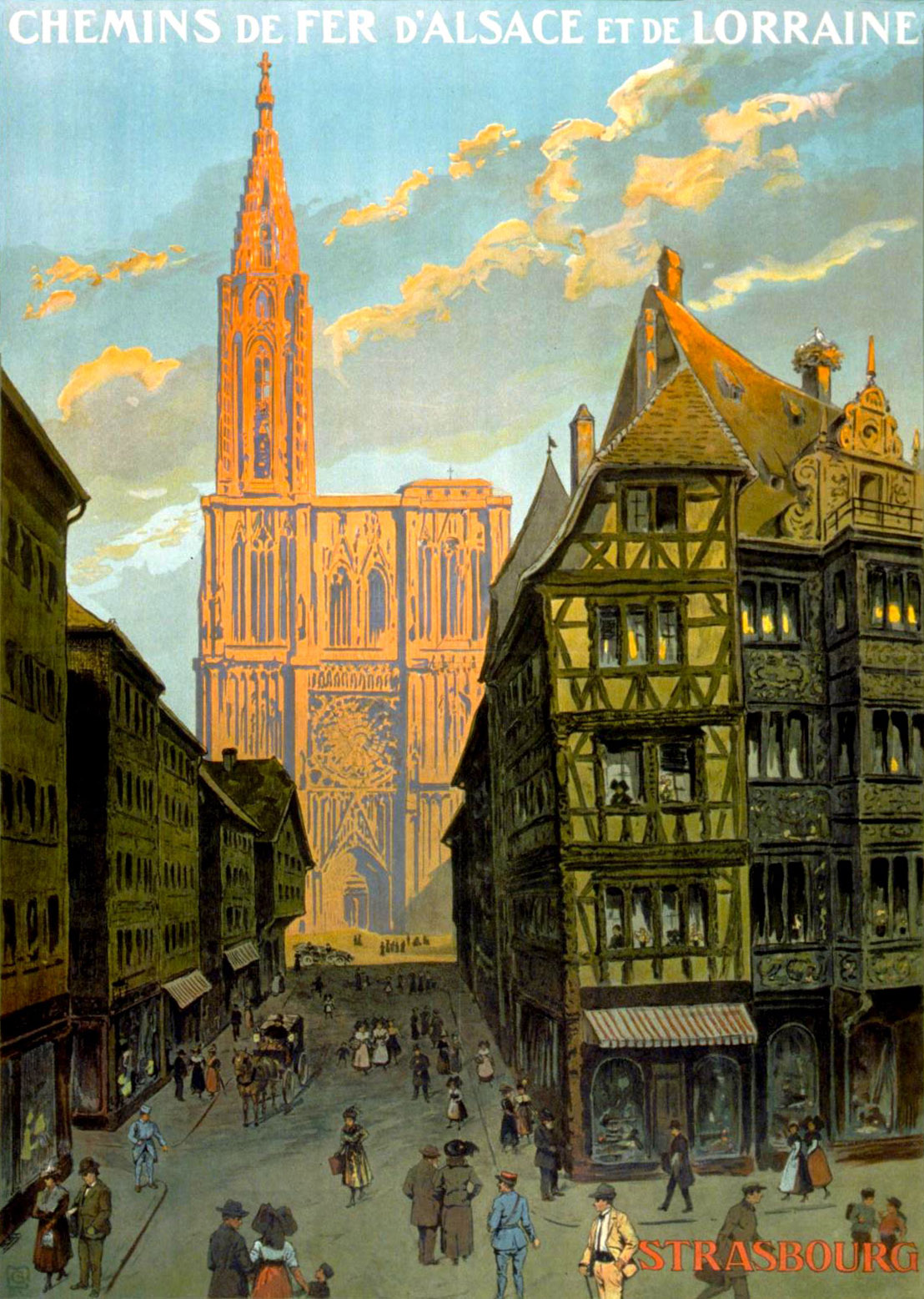
Chemins de Fer Alsace Lorraine affiche cathédrale Strasbourg

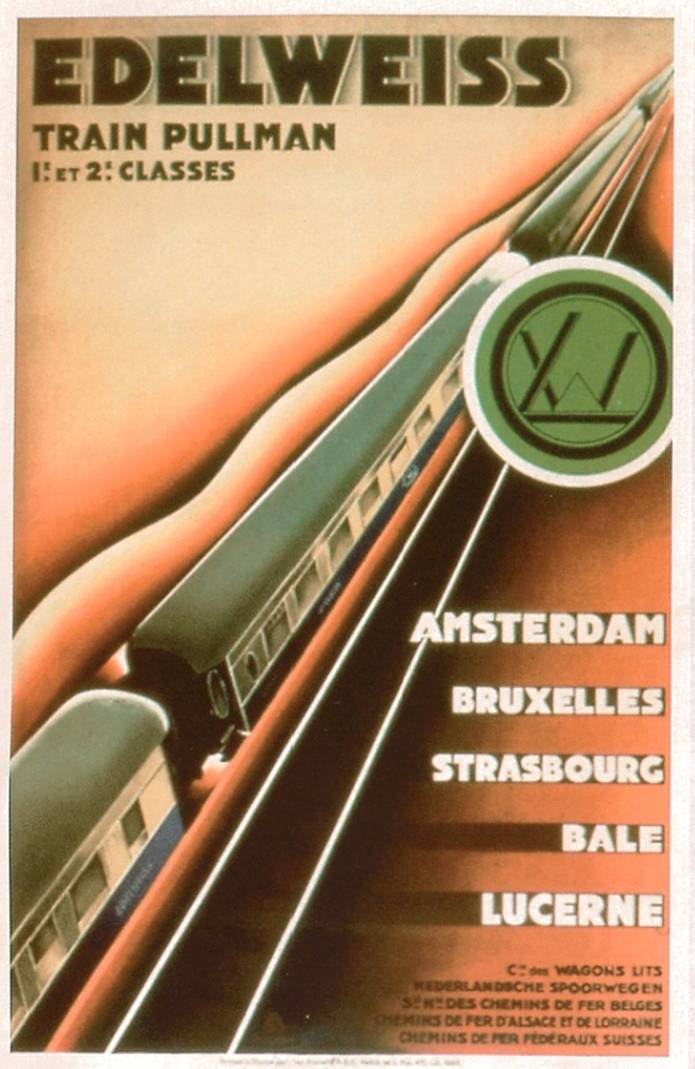
Edelweiss-Pullman, 1928, Petitjean

== See also ==
- Imperial Railways in Alsace-Lorraine
