= Noertzange railway station =

Railway station in Luxembourg

Coordinates: 49°30′28″N 06°02′57″E

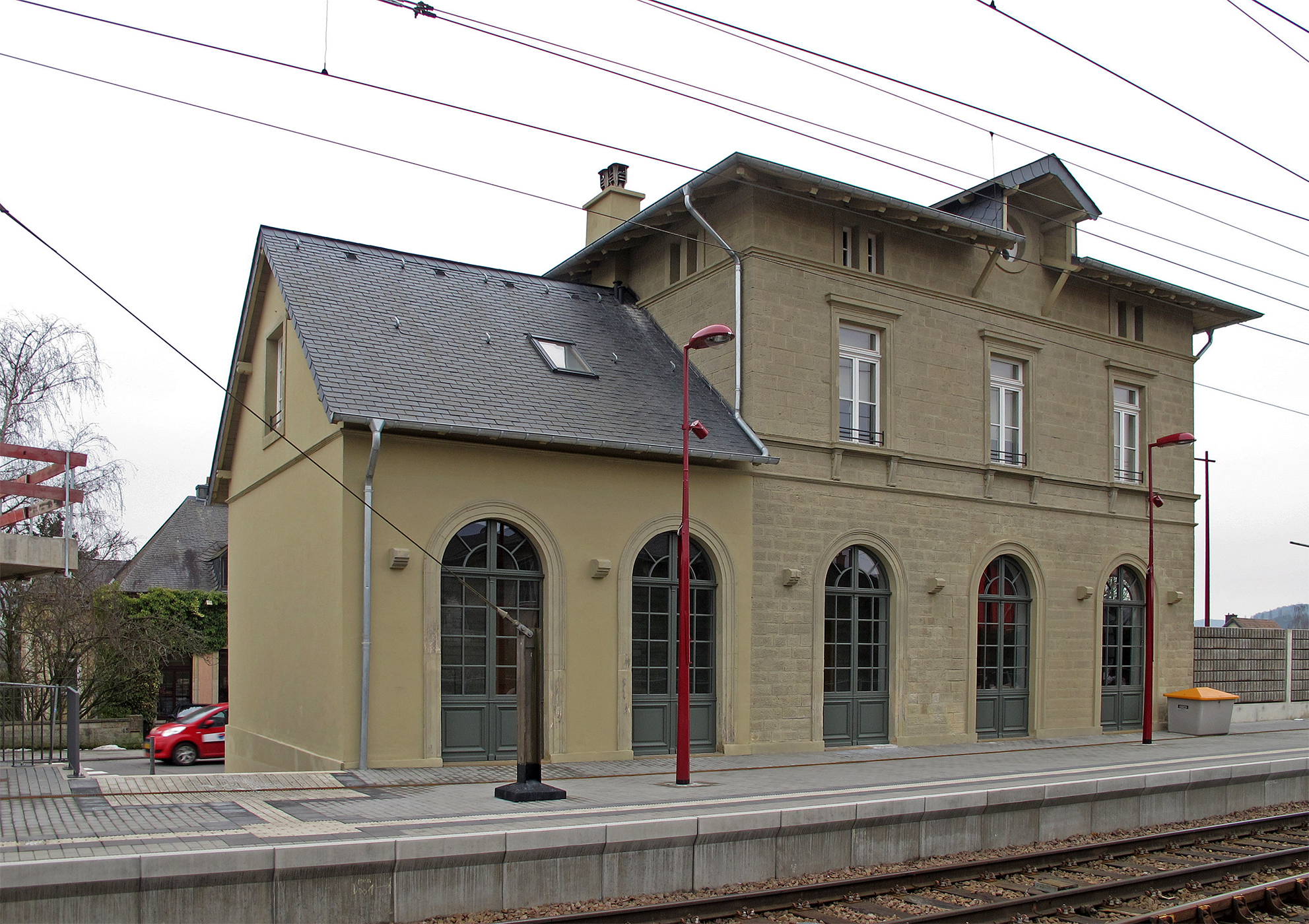
Railway station

Noertzange railway station (Luxembourgish: Gare Näerzeng, French: Gare de Noertzange, German: Bahnhof Nörtzingen) is a railway station serving Noertzange, in southern Luxembourg. It is operated by Chemins de Fer Luxembourgeois, the state-owned railway company.

The station is situated on Line 60, which connects Luxembourg City to the Red Lands of the south of the country. After Noertzange, the main line continues towards Niederkorn, whilst a branch line leads towards Rumelange, to the south, via Kayl.

Preceding station	CFL	Following station
Bettembourg towards Luxembourg	Line 60	Schifflange towards Rodange
Terminus	Line 60B	Kayl towards Rumelange
