= Noertzange =

Town in Esch-sur-Alzette, Luxembourg

Coordinates: 49°31′N 6°03′E

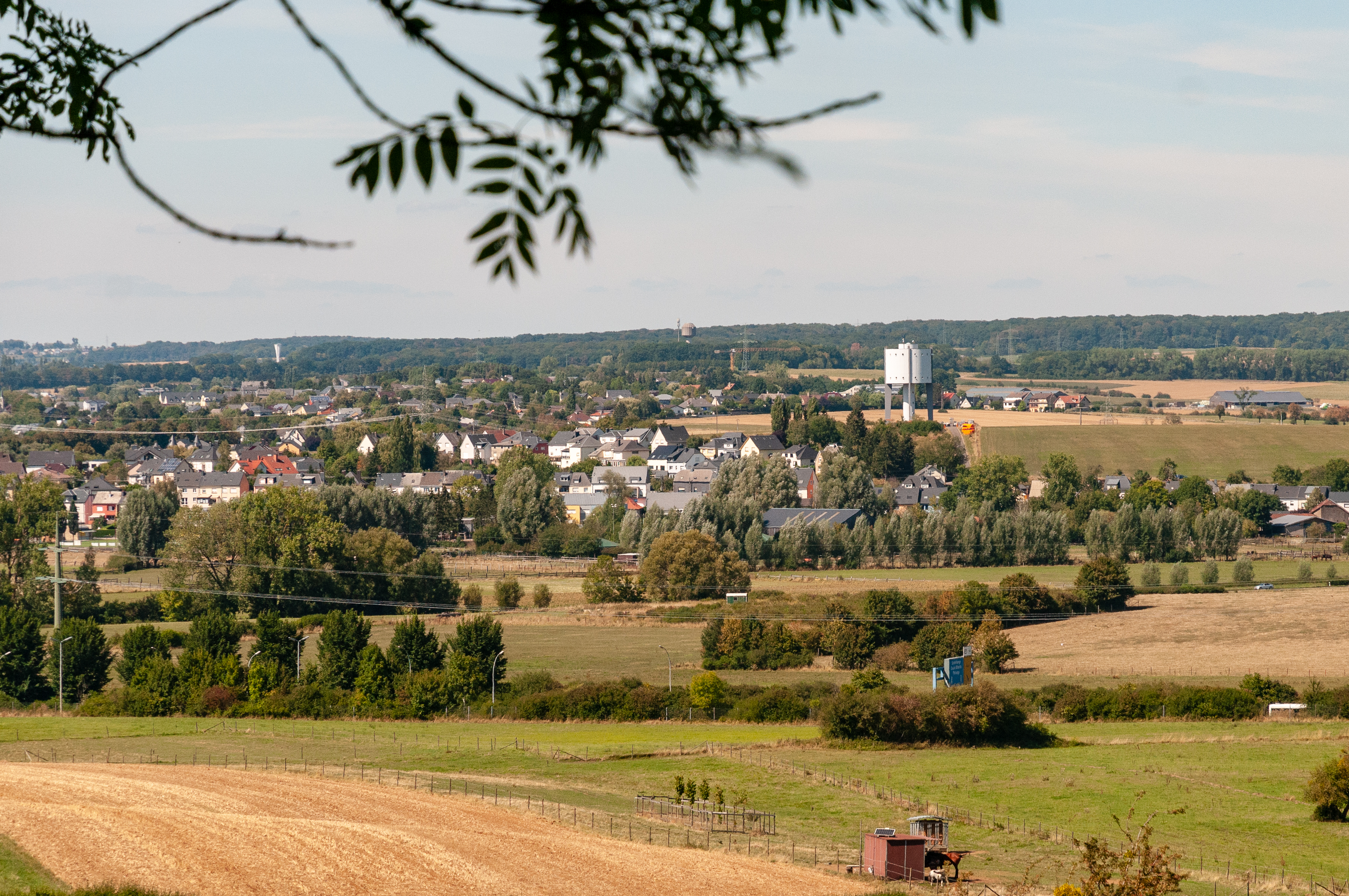
View of Noertzange

Noertzange (French pronunciation: [nœʁtsɑ̃ʒ]; Luxembourgish: Näerzéng, pronounced [ˈnɛːɐ̯tseŋ]; German: Nörtzingen [ˈnœʁtsɪŋən]) is a small town in the commune of Bettembourg, in southern Luxembourg. As of September 2026, the town had a population of 1,077.

Noertzange is the site of a railway junction, with Line 60 dividing between the main line, which leads to Niederkorn, and a branch line, which leads to Rumelange.
