= List of railway stations in Luxembourg =

Wikipedia list page

This is a list of railway stations in Luxembourg. Luxembourg has a well-developed railway network, due in part to its heavily industrialised iron- and steel-producing Red Lands, which are particularly well served. As a result, most towns with over a thousand inhabitants are served by at least one station (and, in the case of Luxembourg City, five).

This list also includes two stations which are situated in France but operated solely by CFL.

Name	Commune	Line	Date of opening	Passengers (2022)
Audun-le-Tiche	Audun-le-Tiche (France)	Line 60	1 September 1880	226,833
Bascharage-Sanem	Käerjeng	Line 70	8 August 1900	434,222
Belval-Lycée	Sanem	Line 60	29 September 2011	1,462,770 (Note: Combined passenger number for Belval-Lycée, Belval-Rédange and Belval-Université.)
Belval-Rédange	Sanem	Line 60	1 August 1873	1,462,770
Belval-Université	Esch-sur-Alzette	Line 60	8 November 2009	1,462,770
Belvaux-Soleuvre	Sanem	Line 60	1 August 1873	63,609
Berchem	Roeser	Line 60	11 August 1859	175,986
Bertrange-Strassen	Bertrange	Line 50	15 September 1859	
Bettembourg	Bettembourg	Line 60	11 August 1859	3,495,828
Betzdorf	Betzdorf	Line 30	1 January 1908	45,462
Capellen	Mamer	Line 50	15 September 1859	92,292
Cents-Hamm	Luxembourg	Line 30	29 September 1991	51,660
Clervaux	Clervaux	Line 10	15 December 1866	331,186
Colmar-Berg	Colmar-Berg	Line 10	21 July 1862	103,199
Cruchten	Nommern	Line 10	21 July 1862	51,188
Diekirch	Diekirch	Line 10	16 November 1862	459,850
Differdange	Differdange	Line 60	1 August 1873	990,902
Dippach-Reckange	Dippach	Line 70	8 August 1900	184,775
Dommeldange	Luxembourg	Line 10	21 July 1862	399,035
Drauffelt	Clervaux	Line 10	3 October 1889	50,945
Dudelange-Burange	Dudelange	Line 60	30 May 1999	776,797 (Note: Combined passenger number for Dudelange-Burange, Dudelange-Centre, Dudelange-Usines and Dudelange-Ville.)
Dudelange-Centre	Dudelange	Line 60	30 May 1999	776,797
Dudelange-Usines	Dudelange	Line 60	20 December 1883	776,797
Dudelange-Ville	Dudelange	Line 60	20 December 1883	776,797
Esch-sur-Alzette	Esch-sur-Alzette	Line 60	23 April 1860	2,831,327
Ettelbruck	Ettelbruck	Line 10	21 July 1862	1,768,952
Goebelsmuhle	Bourscheid	Line 10	15 December 1866	45,981
Heisdorf	Steinsel	Line 10	23 May 1993	95,689
Hollerich	Luxembourg	Line 70	8 August 1900	256,011
Howald	Hesperange	Line 60	10 December 2017	415,367
Kautenbach	Kiischpelt	Line 10	15 December 1866	595,008
Kayl	Kayl	Line 60	1 June 1860	5,463
Kleinbettingen	Steinfort	Line 50	15 September 1859	250,907
Lamadelaine	Pétange	Line 60	1 August 1873	310,497
Leudelange	Leudelange	Line 70	8 August 1900	70,640
Lintgen	Lintgen	Line 10	21 July 1862	186,575
Lorentzweiler	Lorentzweiler	Line 10	21 July 1862	151,243
Luxembourg	Luxembourg	Line 10; Line 30; Line 50; Line 60; Line 70	11 August 1859	15,765,929
Mamer	Mamer	Line 50	15 September 1859	280,615 (Note: Combined passenger number for Mamer and Mamer-Lycée.)
Mamer-Lycée	Mamer	Line 50	15 September 2003	280,615
Manternach	Manternach	Line 30	15 May 1900	51,410
Merkholtz	Kiischpelt	Line 10	1 June 1881	6,253
Mersch	Mersch	Line 10	21 July 1862	1,336,910
Mertert	Mertert	Line 30	29 August 1861	52,874
Michelau	Bourscheid	Line 10	10 May 1874	41,213
Munsbach	Schuttrange	Line 30	1899	113,311
Niederkorn	Differdange	Line 60	1 June 1986	146,919
Noertzange	Bettembourg	Line 60	1 March 1861	205,316
Oberkorn	Pétange	Line 60	1 August 1873	171,347
Oetrange	Contern	Line 30	29 August 1861	121,807
Paradiso	Wiltz	Line 10	1997	
Pétange	Pétange	Line 60; Line 70	1 August 1873	1,705,457
Pfaffenthal-Kirchberg	Luxembourg	Line 10	10 December 2017	1,183,133
Rodange	Pétange	Line 60	1 August 1873	1,081,455
Roodt	Betzdorf	Line 30	29 August 1861	97,717
Rumelange	Rumelange	Line 60	1 June 1860	8,077
Sandweiler-Contern	Contern	Line 30	29 August 1861	265,775
Schieren	Schieren	Line 10	20 April 1881	105,103
Schifflange	Schifflange	Line 60	23 April 1860	710,620
Schouweiler	Dippach	Line 70	8 August 1900	46,263
Tétange	Kayl	Line 60	1 June 1860	2,623
Troisvierges	Troisvierges	Line 10	15 December 1866	261,756
Volmerange-les-Mines	Volmerange-les-Mines (France)	Line 60	15 December 2003	65,545
Walferdange	Walferdange	Line 10	21 July 1862	274,238
Wasserbillig	Mertert	Line 30	29 August 1861	390,078
Wecker	Biwer	Line 30	29 August 1861	113,703
Wiltz	Wiltz	Line 10	1 June 1881	255,679
Wilwerwiltz	Kiischpelt	Line 10	15 December 1866	57,078
