= Cruchten railway station =

Railway station in Luxembourg

Cruchten Kruuchten
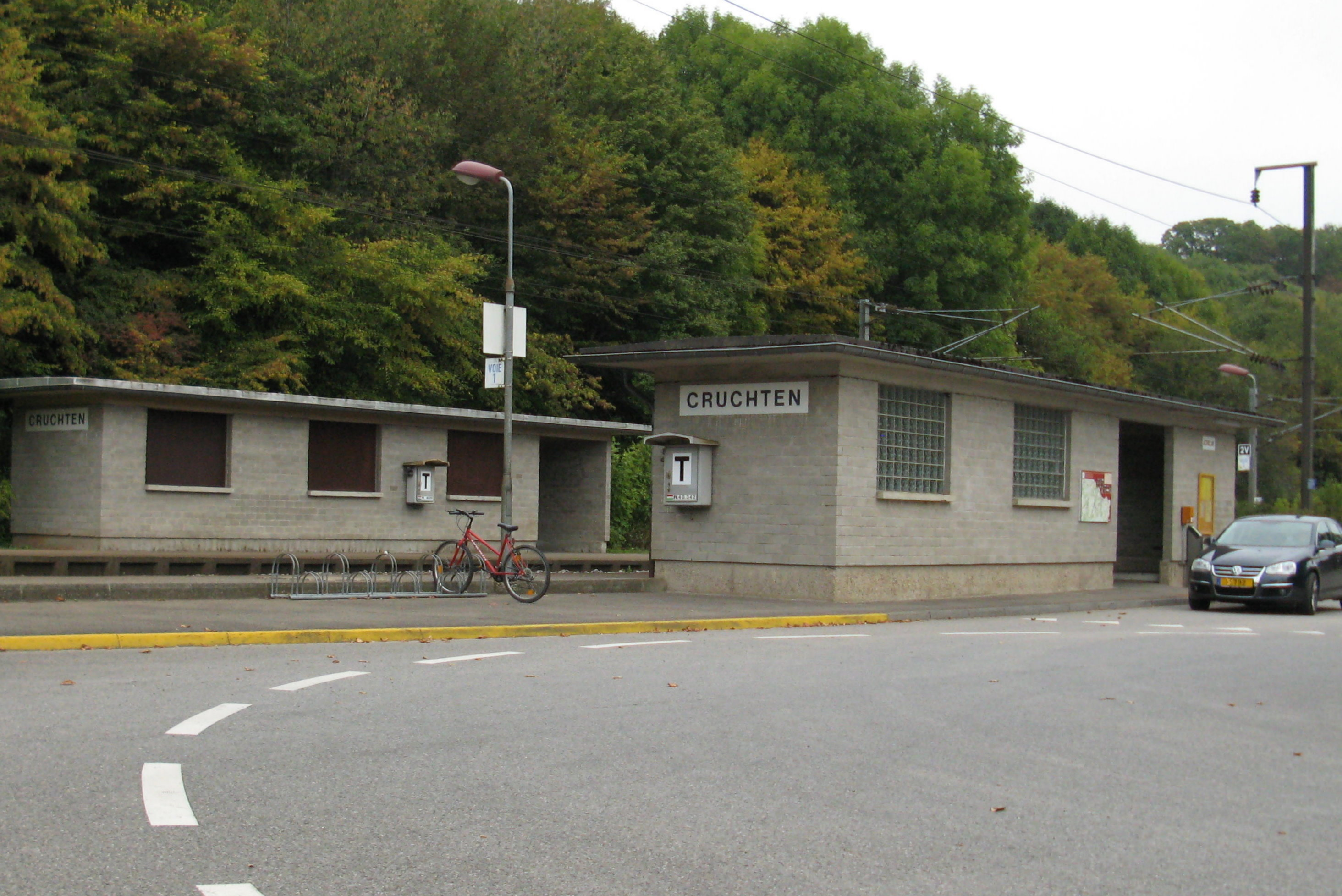

General information
- Location: Rue de la Gare; L-7420 Cruchten
- Coordinates: 49°47′47″N 06°06′12″E
- Operator: CFL
- Line: CFL Line 10
- Platforms: 2
- Tracks: 2
- Train operators: CFL
- Connections: RGTR bus line 231

Construction
- Parking: 27 parking spaces

Other information
- Website: CFL

History
- Opened: 21 July 1862

Passengers
- 2022: 51,118
- Rank: 51 of 60

Services
Preceding station	CFL	Following station
Mersch towards Luxembourg	Line 10	Colmar-Berg towards Diekirch
Location

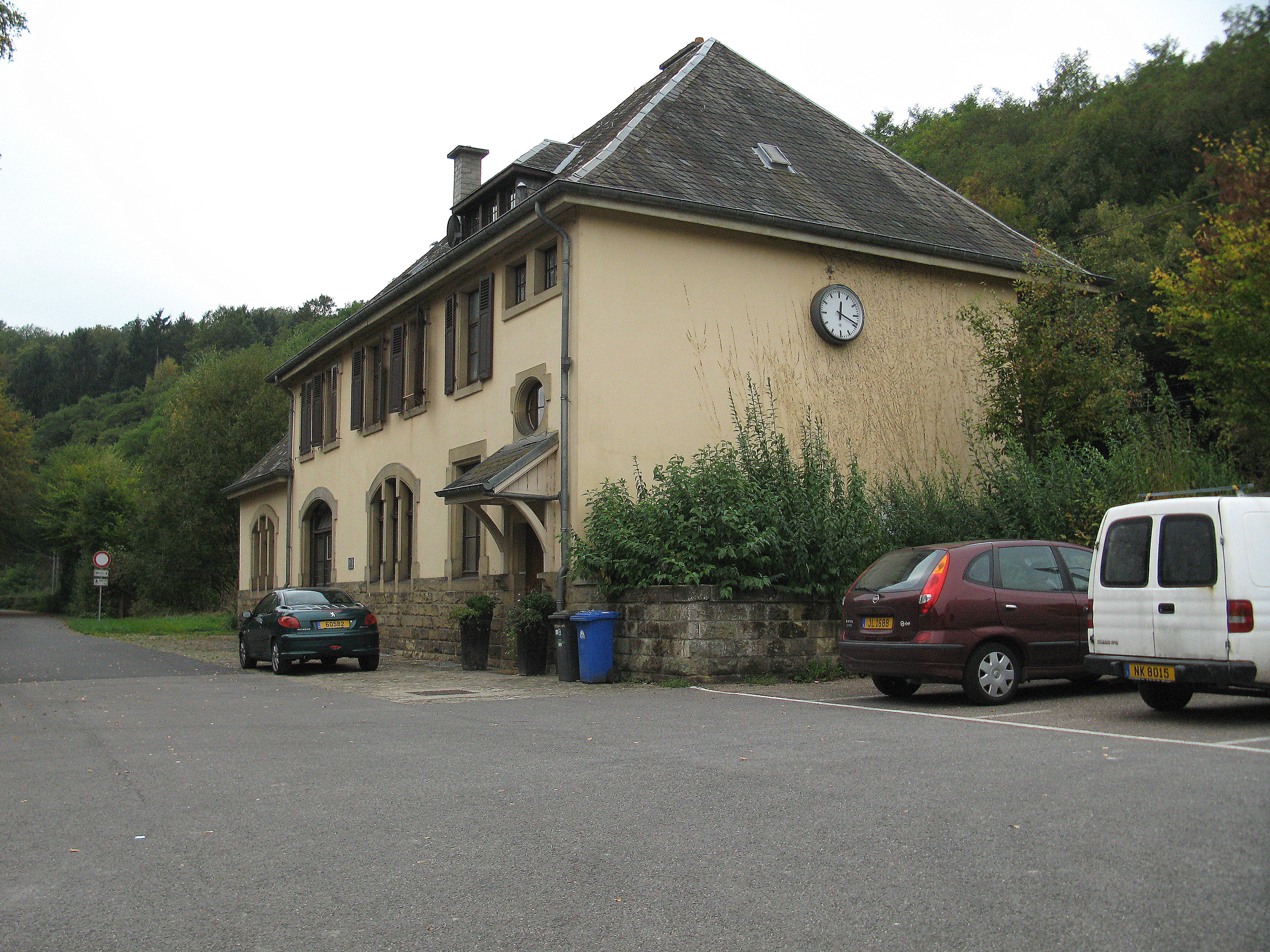
Old train station Cruchten

Cruchten railway station (Luxembourgish: Gare Kruuchten, French: Gare de Cruchten, German: Bahnhof Kruchten) is a railway station serving the town of Cruchten, in the commune of Nommern, in central Luxembourg. It is operated by Chemins de Fer Luxembourgeois, the state-owned railway company.

The station is situated on Line 10, which connects Luxembourg City to the centre and north of the country.
