= Maulusmuhle railway station =

Former railway station in Luxembourg

Coordinates: 50°05′40″N 06°01′35″E

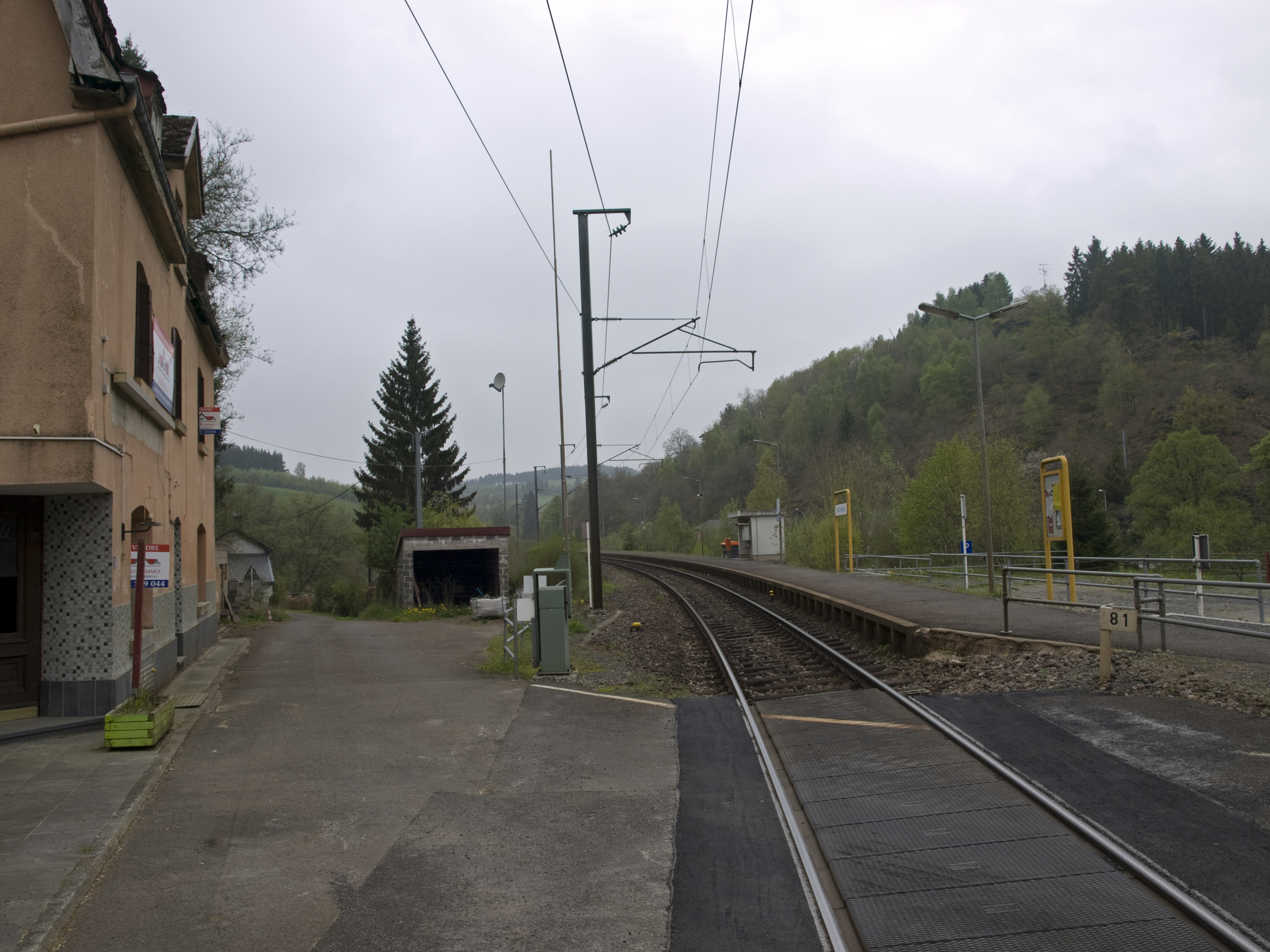
Maulusmuhle station platforms

Maulusmuhle railway station (Luxembourgish: Gare Maulesmillen, French: Gare de Maulusmuhle, German: Bahnhof Maulusmühle) was a railway station serving Maulusmuhle, in the commune of Weiswampach, in northern Luxembourg. It was operated by the Société Nationale des Chemins de Fer Luxembourgeois, the state-owned railway company.

The station was situated on Line 10, which connects Luxembourg City to the centre and north of the country, between Clervaux and Troisvierges. It was closed on 14 December 2014.
