= Schieren railway station =

Railway station in Luxembourg

Schieren
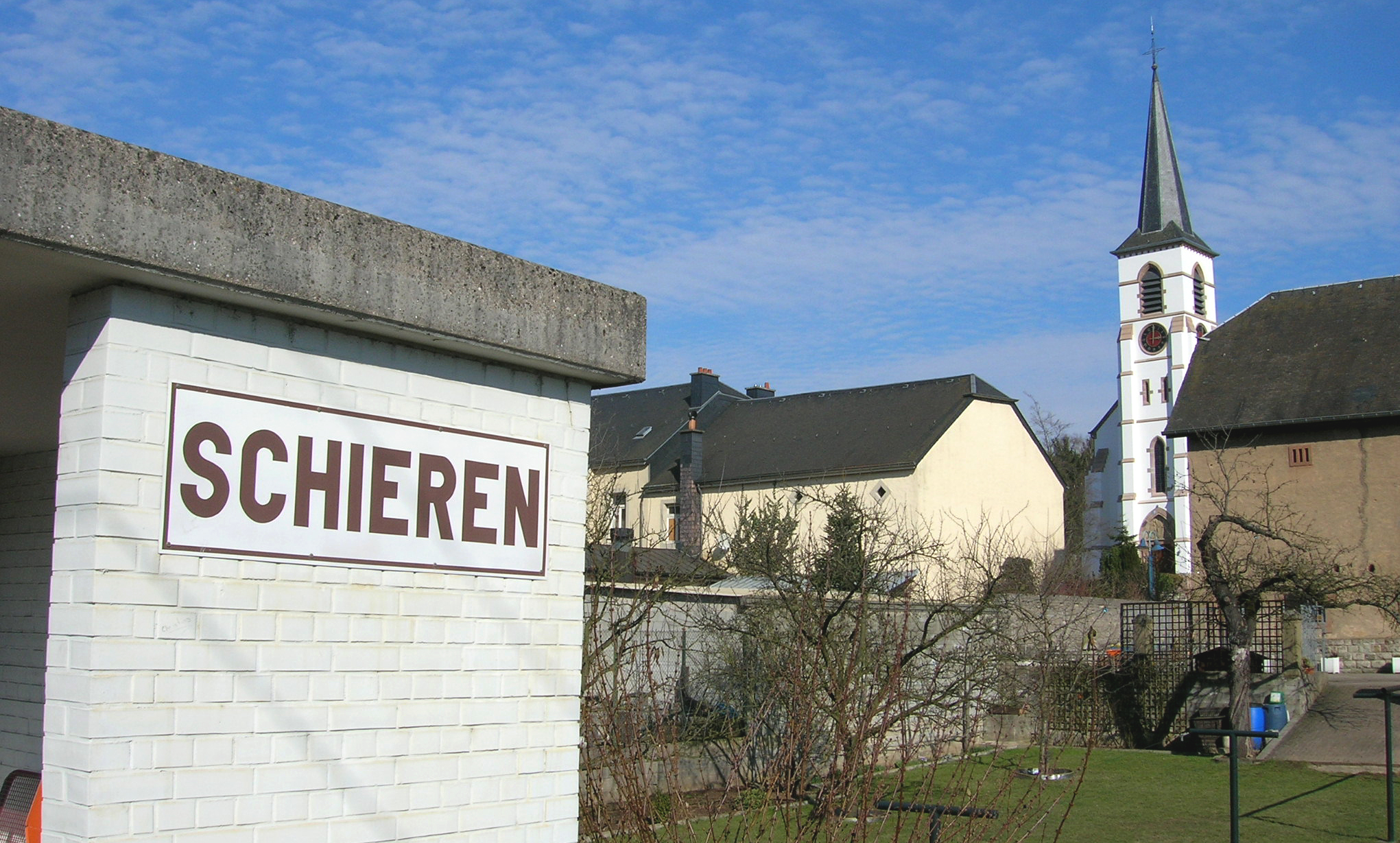

General information
- Location: Rue de la Gare; L-9122 Schieren
- Coordinates: 49°49′57″N 06°05′43″E
- Operator: CFL
- Line: CFL Line 10
- Platforms: 2
- Tracks: 3
- Train operators: CFL
- Connections: RGTR bus lines 117 and 118

Construction
- Parking: 36 parking spaces
- Cycle facilities: 16 mBox cycle spaces

Other information
- Website: CFL

History
- Opened: 20 April 1880

Passengers
- 2022: 105,103
- Rank: 39 of 60

Services
Preceding station	CFL	Following station
Colmar-Berg towards Luxembourg	Line 10	Ettelbruck towards Diekirch
Location

Schieren railway station (Luxembourgish: Gare Schiren, French: Gare de Schieren, German: Bahnhof Schieren) is a railway station serving Schieren, in central Luxembourg. It is operated by Chemins de Fer Luxembourgeois, the state-owned railway company.

The station is situated on Line 10, which connects Luxembourg City to the centre and north of the country.

Preceding station	CFL	Following station
Colmar-Berg towards Luxembourg	Line 10	Ettelbruck towards Diekirch
