= CFL Class 2400 and 2450 =

Luxembourgish electric multiple units

CFL Class 2400/2450
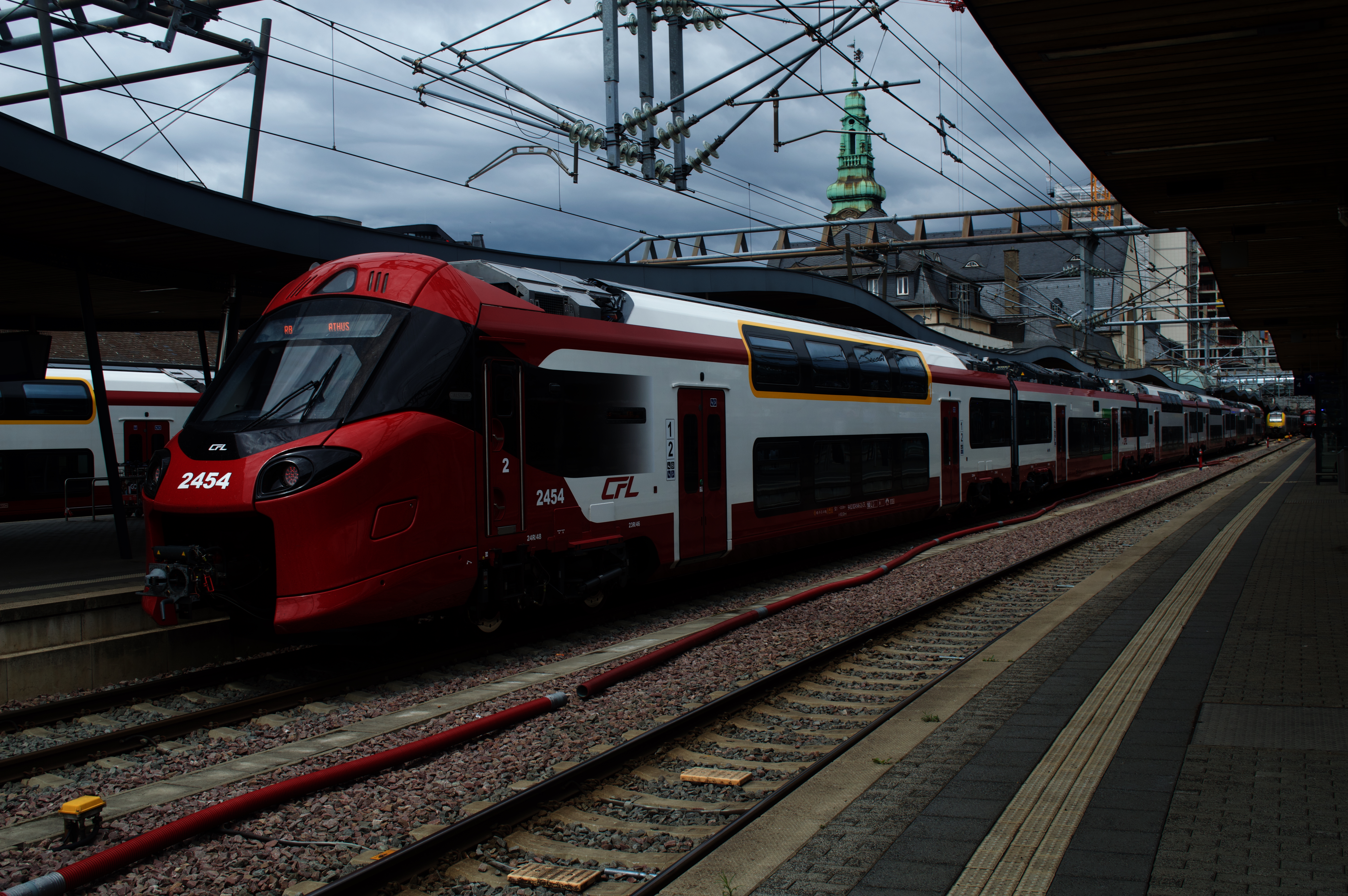
- 2454 in 2026

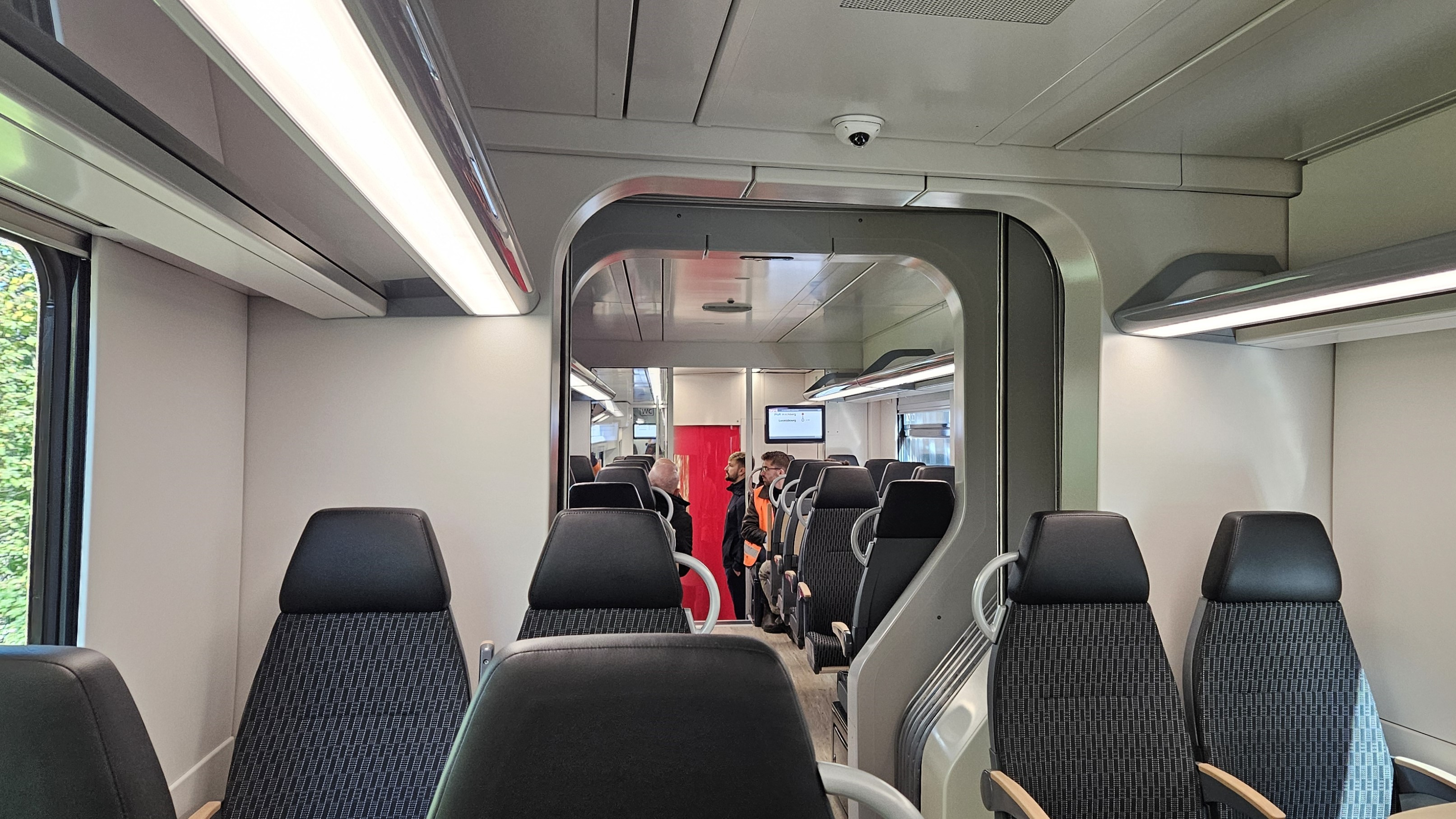
- Second class lower deck interior
- In service: 2024 - Present
- Manufacturer: Alstom
- Built at: Santa Perpètua de Mogoda
- Family name: Coradia
- Constructed: 2021 - Present
- Number built: 2400: 22 trainsets; 2450: 12 trainsets
- Number in service: 19
- Capacity: 2400: 334; 2450: 692
- Operator: CFL

Specifications
- Train length: 2400: 82 m (269 ft 3/8 in); 2450: 160.6 m (526 ft 10 13/16 in)
- Maximum speed: 160 km/h (99 mph)
- Weight: 2400: 160 t (160 long tons; 180 short tons); 2450: 300 t (300 long tons; 330 short tons)
- Power output: 2400: 3,300 kW (4,400 hp); 2450: 6,350 kW (8,520 hp)
- Electric system: 25 kV 50 Hz AC (nominal) from overhead catenary
- Current collection: pantograph
- UIC classification: 2′Bo′+Bo′Bo′+Bo′2′(+2′Bo′+Bo′Bo′+Bo′2′)
- Track gauge: 1,435 mm (4 ft 8 1/2 in) standard gauge

CFL Class 2400 and 2450 are a series of electric multiple units of the Coradia Max type built by Alstom for the Luxembourg National Railway Company, CFL, which is the first customer for this double-decker version (only one deck for the intermediate motor cars, with the roof occupied by technical equipment).

== Description ==
On 18 December 2018, the CFL signed a contract with Alstom for the delivery of 34 double-decker regional trains. The €350 million order included 22 three-carriage ‘short units’ (Class 2400) and 12 six-carriage ‘long units’ (Class 2450). Deliveries were initially scheduled to take place between December 2021 and December 2024, but due to the COVID-19 pandemic, they were postponed from February 2023 to December 2025.

The trains, which operate in Luxembourg, France and Belgium, replaced all of the CFL's Class 2000 EMUs, built between 1990 and 1992, and are due to increase the seat capacity of its fleet by nearly 50%.

The first train, number 2410, entered service on 29 September 2024. The first Class 2450 train entered service on 19 January 2026, with the entire 2400 and 2450 fleet due to be delivered by late 2026.

== Services ==
As of 2025, Class 2400 trains are used on the following connections:

- Noertzange – Rumelange
- Bettembourg – Volmerange-les-Mines
- Esch-sur-Alzette – Audun-le-Tiche
- Luxembourg – Ettelbruck – Diekirch
- Kautenbach – Wiltz
- Luxembourg – Wasserbillig
- Luxembourg – Kleinbettingen
- Luxembourg – Arlon
