= Heisdorf railway station =

Railway station in Heisdorf, Luxembourg

Heisdorf Heeschdref
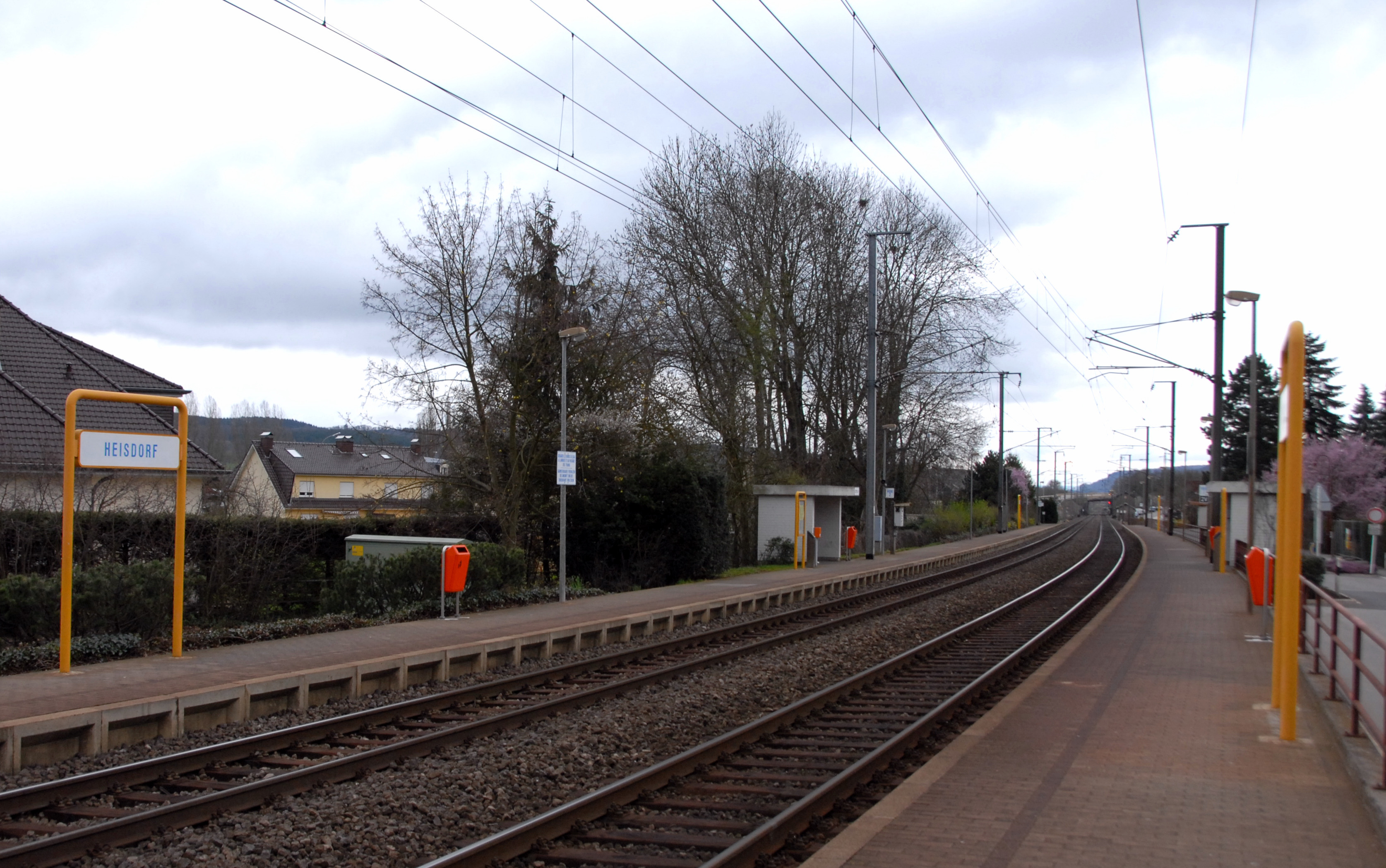

General information
- Location: Rue de la Forêt Verte L-7304 Heisdorf
- Coordinates: 49°40′31″N 06°08′22″E
- Operator: CFL
- Line: CFL Line 10
- Platforms: 2
- Tracks: 2
- Train operators: CFL
- Connections: AVL bus lines 11 and 26; RGTR bus lines 110 and 111

Construction
- Parking: 14 parking spaces
- Cycle facilities: 16 mBox cycle spaces; 7 cycle spaces

Other information
- Website: CFL

History
- Opened: 23 May 1993

Passengers
- 2022: 95,689
- Rank: 42 of 60

Services
Preceding station	CFL	Following station
Walferdange towards Luxembourg	Line 10	Lorentzweiler towards Diekirch
Location

Heisdorf railway station (Luxembourgish: Gare Heeschdref, French: Gare de Heisdorf, German: Bahnhof Heisdorf) is a railway station serving Heisdorf, in the commune of Steinsel, in central Luxembourg. It is operated by Chemins de Fer Luxembourgeois, the state-owned railway company.

The station is situated on Line 10, which connects Luxembourg City to the centre and north of the country.
