= Goebelsmuhle railway station =

Railway station in Luxembourg

Goebelsmuhle Giwwelsmillen
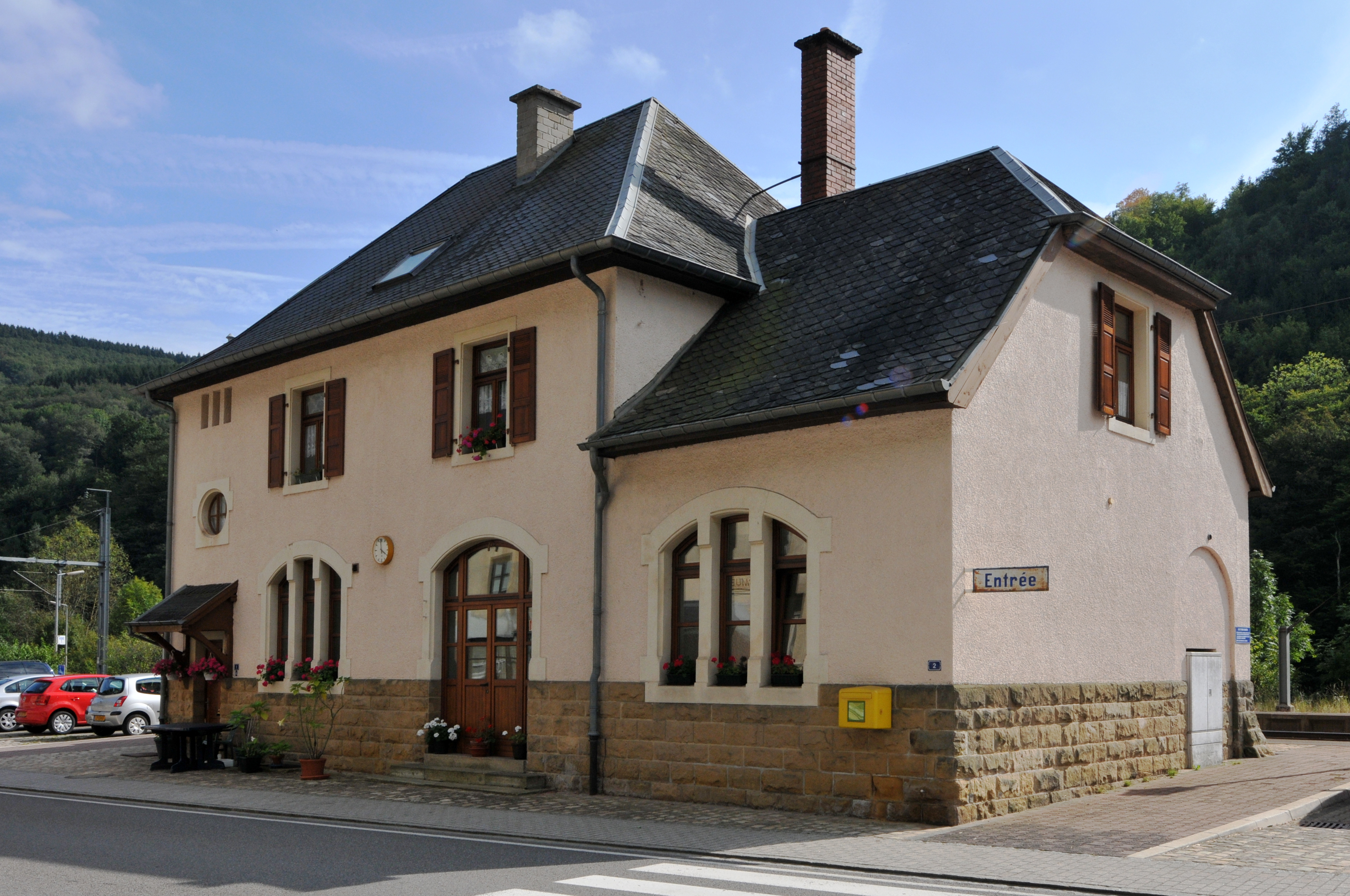

General information
- Location: Route d'Ettelbruck; 9153 Goebelsmuhle; Luxembourg
- Coordinates: 49°55′16″N 06°03′12″E
- Operator: Chemins de Fer Luxembourgeois, SNCB
- Line: CFL Line 10
- Platforms: 2
- Tracks: 2
- Connections: RGTR bus line 147

Construction
- Parking: 13 parking spaces
- Cycle facilities: 7 bicycle parking spaces

Other information
- Website: CFL

History
- Opened: 15 December 1866

Passengers
- 2022: 45,891
- Rank: 54 of 60

Services
Preceding station	CFL	Following station
Michelau towards Luxembourg	Line 10	Kautenbach towards Troisvierges
Location

Goebelsmuhle railway station (Luxembourgish: Gare op der Giewelsmillen, French: Gare de Goebelsmuhle) is a railway station serving the village of Goebelsmuhle, in the commune of Bourscheid, in northern Luxembourg. It is operated by Chemins de Fer Luxembourgeois, the state-owned railway company.

The station is situated on Line 10, which connects Luxembourg City to the centre and north of the country.
