= Lintgen railway station =

Railway station in Lintgen, Luxembourg

Lintgen Lëntgen
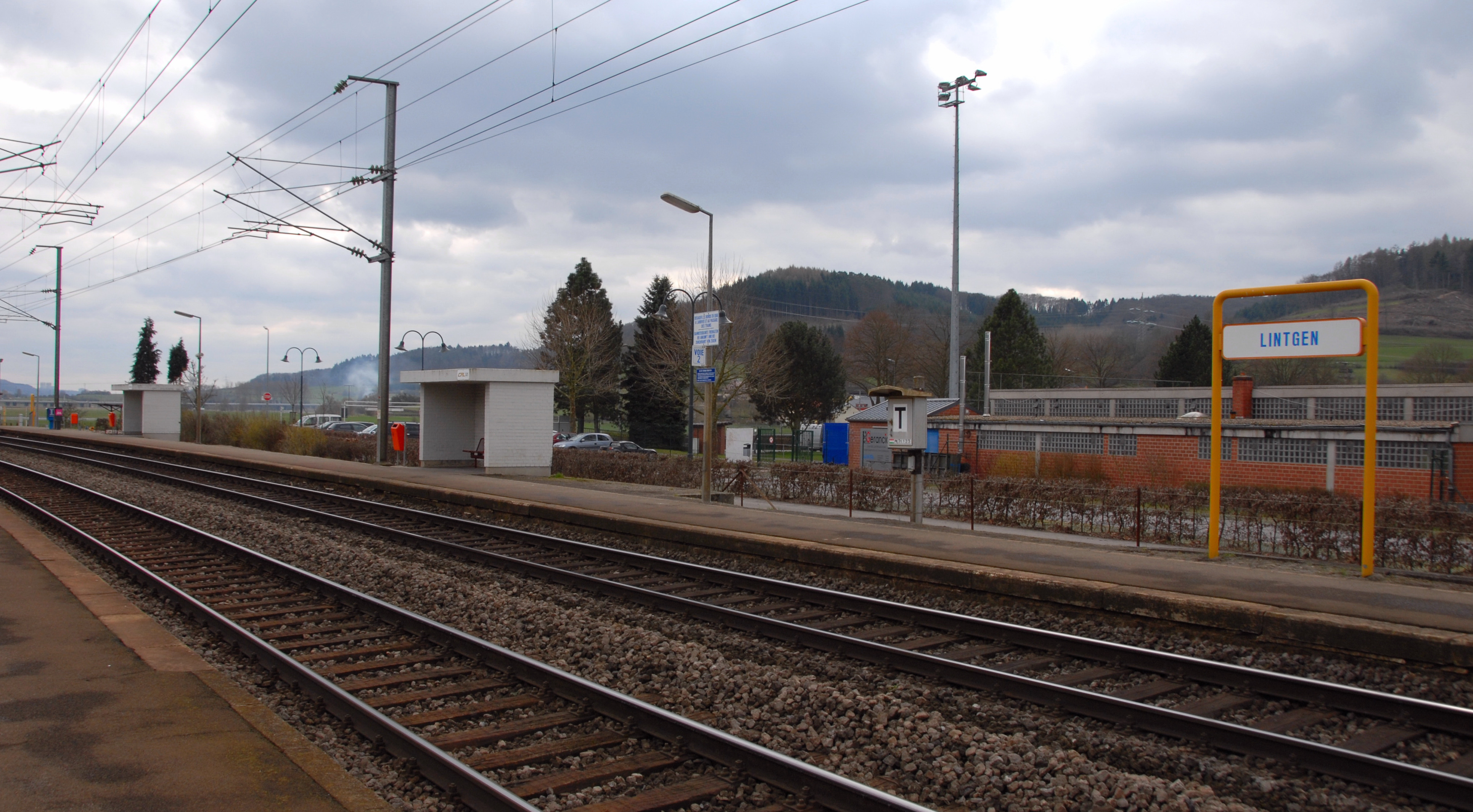

General information
- Location: Rue de la Gare; L-7247 Lintgen
- Coordinates: 49°43′15″N 06°07′23″E
- Operator: CFL
- Line: CFL Line 10
- Platforms: 2
- Tracks: 2
- Train operators: CFL
- Connections: RGTR bus lines 110, 111, 292

Construction
- Parking: 144 parking spaces
- Cycle facilities: 32 mBox cycle spaces

Other information
- Website: CFL

History
- Opened: 21 July 1862

Passengers
- 2022: 186,575
- Rank: 30 of 60

Services
Preceding station	CFL	Following station
Lorentzweiler towards Luxembourg	Line 10	Mersch towards Diekirch
Location

Lintgen railway station (Luxembourgish: Gare Lëntgen, French: Gare de Lintgen, German: Bahnhof Lintgen) is a railway station serving Lintgen, in central Luxembourg. It is operated by Chemins de Fer Luxembourgeois, the state-owned railway company.

The station is situated on Line 10, which connects Luxembourg City to the centre and north of the country.
