= List of CFL classes =

This is the list of rolling stock of the Chemins de Fer Luxembourgeois (CFL).

== Current fleet ==
=== Electric ===
Class	Image	Type	Top speed		Number	Built	Notes
Class	Image	Type	mph	km/h	Number	Built	Notes
Class 2200 (SNCF Z24500)		Electric multiple unit	99	160	22	2004, 2010	
Class 2300		Electric multiple unit	99	160	21	2014	Replaced Class 628 and DB 181.200 locos on service to Trier and Koblenz
Class 2400 and 2450		Electric multiple unit	99	160	34 (ordered); 14 (in service)	2021- 2026	Replaced Class 2000
Class 4000		Electric locomotive	87	140	20	2004-2005	Only TRAXX P140AC locos built.

=== Diesel ===
Class	Image	Type	Top speed		Number	Built	Notes
Class	Image	Type	mph	km/h	Number	Built	Notes
Class 300		Diesel locomotive	37	60	19	1966	2007 ex ARBED. Operated by CFL Cargo.
Class 1100		Diesel locomotive	62	100	6	2004	Rented since 2004. Operated by CFL Cargo
Class 1800		Diesel locomotive	75	120	20	1961-1962	Most withdrawn. Some had steam boilers for passenger trains. Operated by CFL Cargo.

== Past fleet ==
Class	Image	Type	Top speed		Number	Built	Retired	Notes
Class	Image	Type	mph	km/h	Number	Built	Retired	Notes
Class 200		Diesel multiple unit	65	105	8	1956	Two units preserved.	
Class 250 Nickname "Moulinex"		Electric multiple unit	75	120	6	1975	2006	New Build, ran with Class 260. Sold to CFR, Romania.
Class 260, Nickname "Moulinex"		Electric multiple unit	75	120	2	1971	2006	EX-SNCF Z26169, 26168, ran with Class 250, Sold to CFR, Romania.
Class 450		Diesel locomotive	21	35	5	1953	?	1 preserved
Class 628		Diesel multiple unit			2	1994	2014	Returned to DBAG in 2014, replaced by Class 2300
Class 1600		Diesel locomotive	75	120	4	1955	1994	All but 1601 preserved.
Class 2000 (SNCF Z11500)		Electric multiple unit	99	160	22	1990-1992	2025	All but two units sold to a private Romanian railway company. Replaced by Class 2400 and 2450.
Class 2100		Railcar	75	120	6	2000	?	Sold to SNCF as TER Lorraine X 73813 - 73818 in order
Class 3000 (SNCB Class 13)		Electric locomotive	124	200	20	1997-1998	2026 (Passenger service)	Two scrapped Four still in service with CFL cargo on limited freight service before full retirement Six in storage Eight transferred to Romania
Class 3600		Electric locomotive	75	120	20	1958-1959	2005	1 preserved
Wegmann		Carriage			60	1965-1967	2006	Up to 10 preserved including 1 or 2 owned by the GAR

=== Diesel Shunters ===
Class	Image	
Class 600		
Class 800		Three preserved, one by CFL
Class 850		One preserved by CFL, many sold to French operators
Class 900		Many sold to French operators
Class 1000		
Class 1020		
Class 1030		
Class 2001		

=== Diesel Locos ===
Class	Image
Class 1500	
Class 1600	
Class 1700	One on short term lease (1701), now gone.

=== On Track Plant ===
Class	Image
Class 1050	
Class 1060	
Class 1070	
