= Michelau, Luxembourg =

Coordinates: 49°54′N 6°06′E

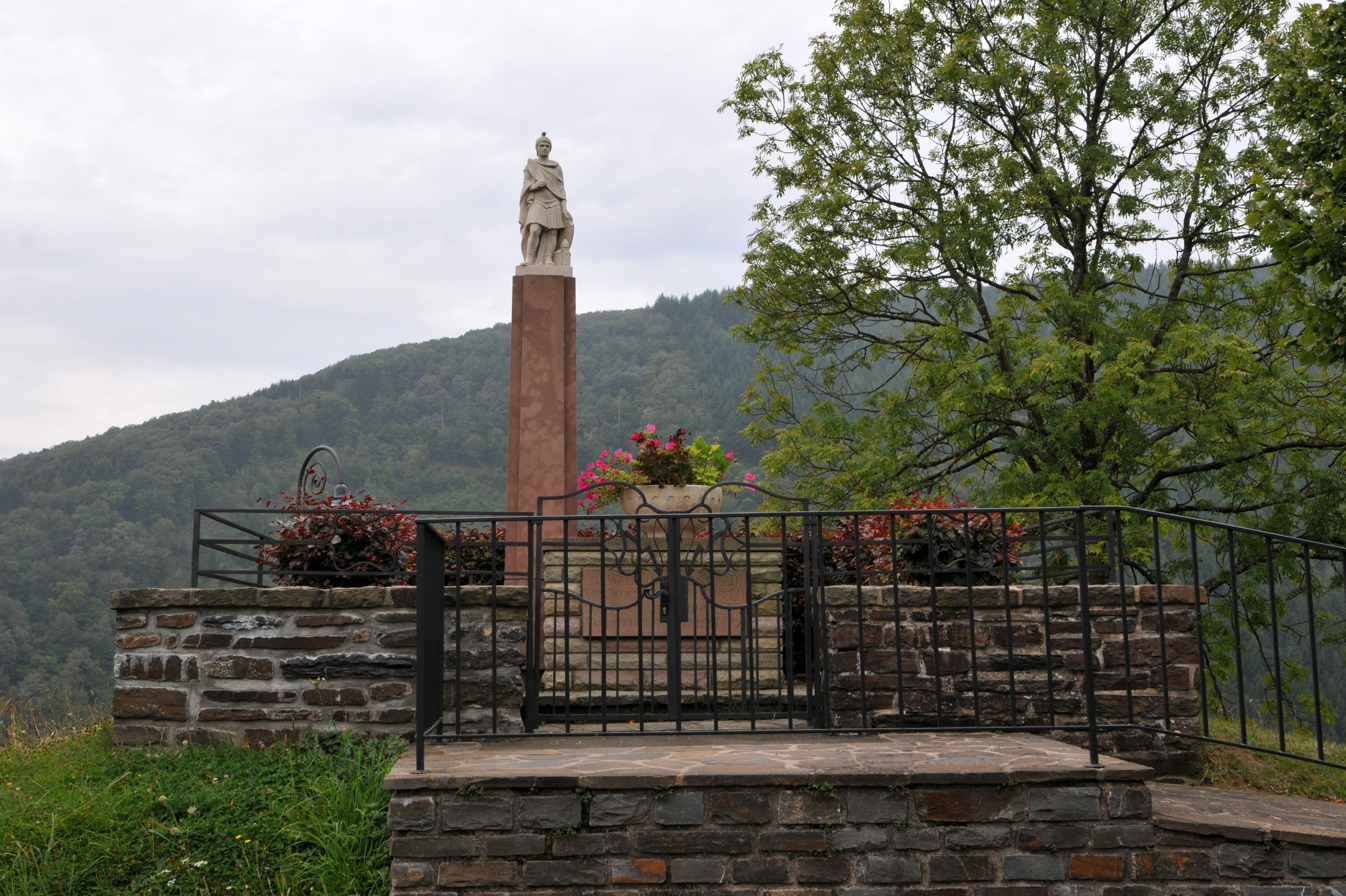
Saint Donatus statue above Michelau.

Michelau (German pronunciation: [ˈmɪçəlaʊ]; Luxembourgish: Méchela) is a small town in the commune of Bourscheid, in north-eastern Luxembourg. As of September 2026, the town had a population of 422.

It is served by Michelau railway station, which lies on CFL Line 10.
