= CFL Class 2000 =

Class of two-car electric multiple units

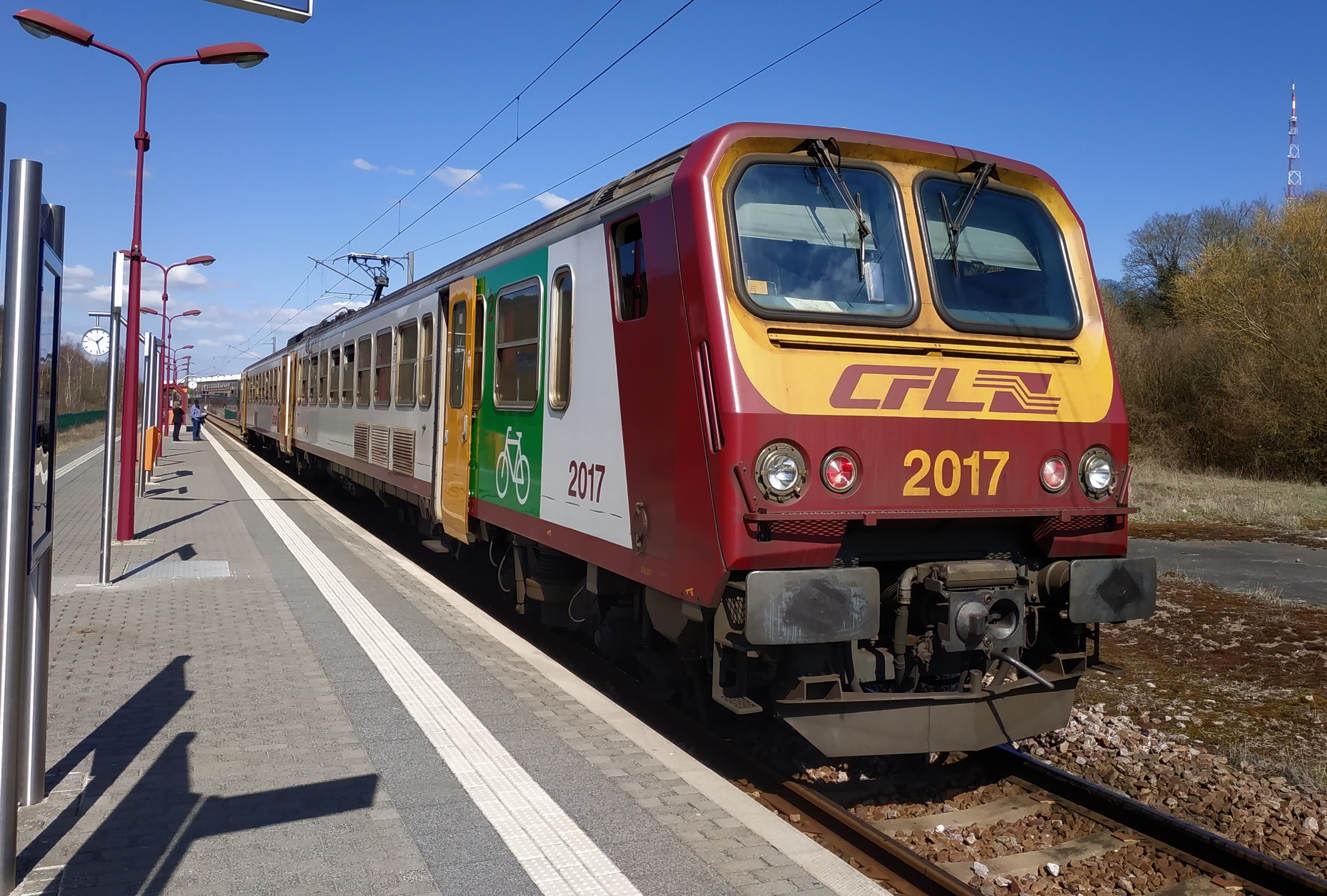
- CFL class 2000 in 2019

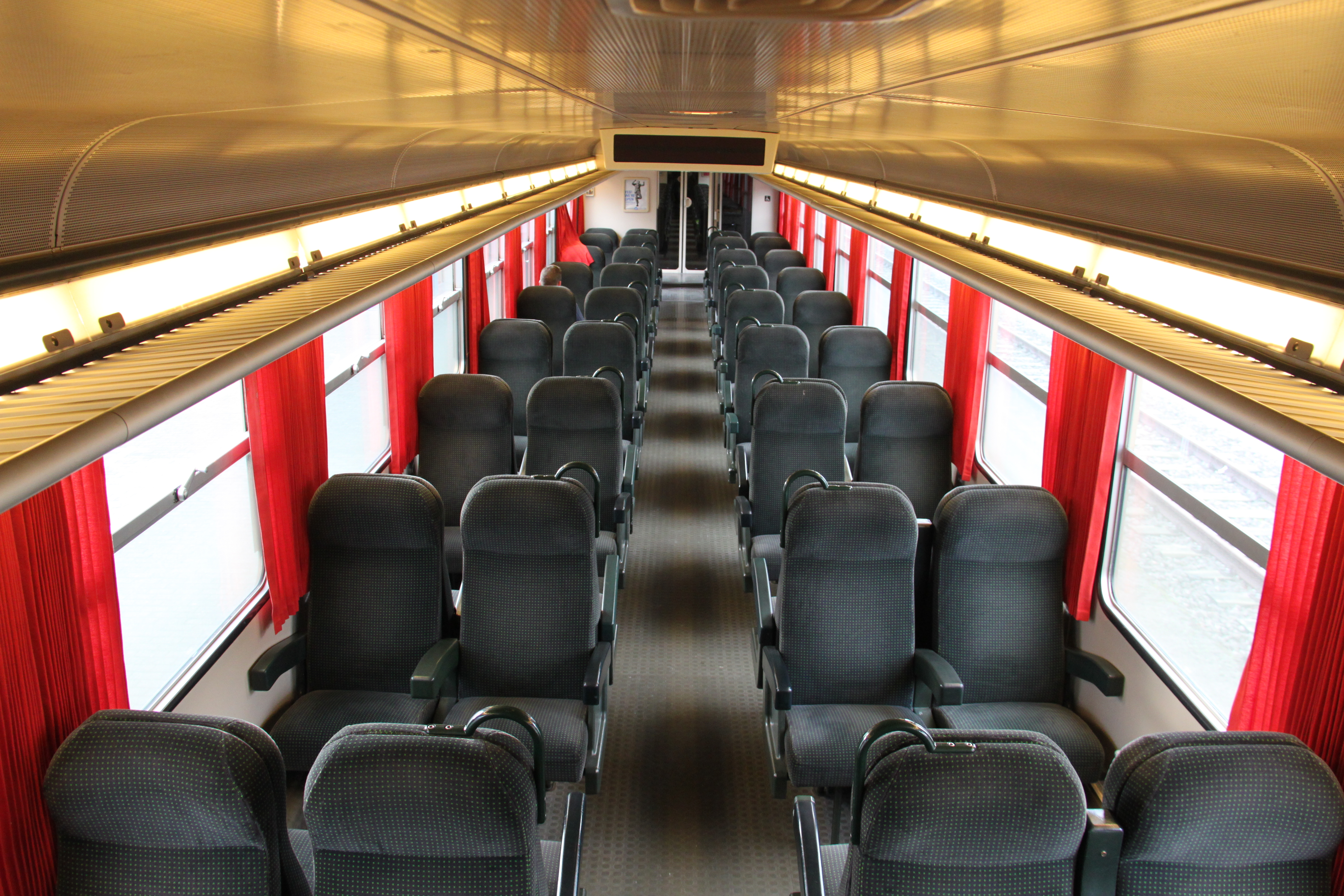
- Second class interior
- In service: 1990–2025; 2026–
- Manufacturer: De Dietrich / ANF / Alsthom
- Constructed: 1990–1992
- Number built: 22 trainsets (44 vehicles)
- Formation: ABD+B (DMBCO-DTSO)
- Capacity: As Built: 24 First 60 Standard 1 Toilet (ABD); 80 Standard 1 Toilet (B)
- Operator: CFL Regio Călători Transferoviar Călători FeroTrafic TFI

Specifications
- Train length: 50.20 m (164 ft 8 in)
- Car length: 25.10 m (82 ft 4 in)
- Maximum speed: 160 km/h (99 mph)
- Weight: 64 t (ABD); 40 t (B)
- Power output: 1,220 kilowatts (1,640 hp)
- Electric system: 25 kV AC overhead lines
- Current collection: pantograph
- AAR wheel arrangement: 2-Bo + 2-2
- Safety systems: KVB, ETCS
- Multiple working: within class
- Track gauge: 1,435 mm (4 ft 8 1/2 in) standard gauge

CFL Class 2000 is a class of electric multiple units operated by CFL on the Luxembourgish railway network from 1990 to 2025. They were built in 1990–1992 by a consortium of De Dietrich, ANF and Alstom and are similar to SNCF's Z 11500 class.

== History ==
The Z2 family of multiple units was designed by Francorail and Ateliers de construction du Nord de la France. CFL selected a variant of the Z 11500 class for their network.

Starting in 2024, the 2000 series was progressively replaced by the Class 2400 and 2450, a series of 34 Coradia Stream railcars from the Coradia family produced by Alstom, which is due to increase the CFL's total seat capacity by 46%. All units were due to be transferred to Romania's Ferotrans TFI (a newcomer on the Romanian market) by the end of 2025, with ten having left Luxembourg by 22 June 2025. The last units, 2009 and 2022, were retired on 29 November 2025. From the end of March 2026, Private Romanian operator Ferotrafic TFI were due to start operating the units on a service from Suceava to Bucharest .

=== Names ===
Four 2000s were named after places in Luxembourg. They carried the appropriate crests on the side of the driving cab.

- 2001: Mersch
- 2003: Betzdorf
- 2004: Pétange
- 2018: Troisvierges

== Construction ==
The individual cars were built with steel frames.

== Technical ==
The multiple working system allowed three units to be worked as a single train with one driver. The individual vehicles were numbered (in UIC format) as 94 82 00 20xx 1-y and 94 82 00 20xx 2-y, where 20xx is the unit number and y the check digit.

== Operations ==
Within Luxembourg 2000s were used, alongside 2200 series EMUs, for RB (Regionalbunn) services on Line 1. They were otherwise use on secondary lines: 1b from Kautenbach to Wiltz, 6a from Bettembourg to Volmerange-les-Mines via Dudelange, 6b from Noertzange to Rumelange, and 6c from Esch-sur-Alzette to Audun-le-Tiche.

== Service in Romania ==
Following their retirement in Luxembourg, 20 units were purchased, 1 being kept by CFL for heritage purposes. 12 units are currently in service, numbered Z101-Z112(power cars) and Z201-Z212(trailers). In order to make them more suited for long distance travel, they were fitted with AC, plug sockets and vending machines. Ferotrafic TFI units also feature tables between seats.

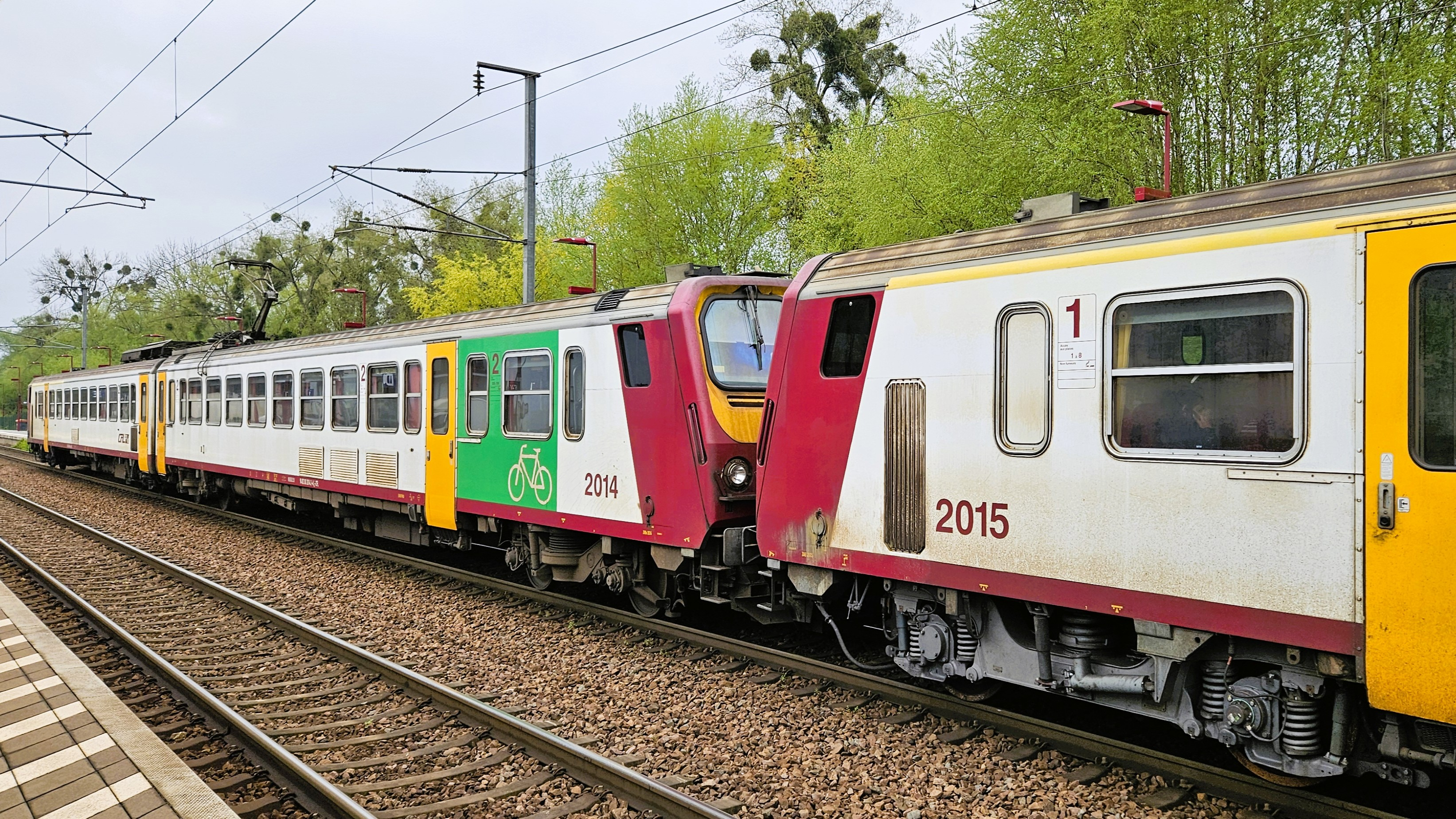
2014 & 2015 at Lorentzweiler in 2025

== Interior ==
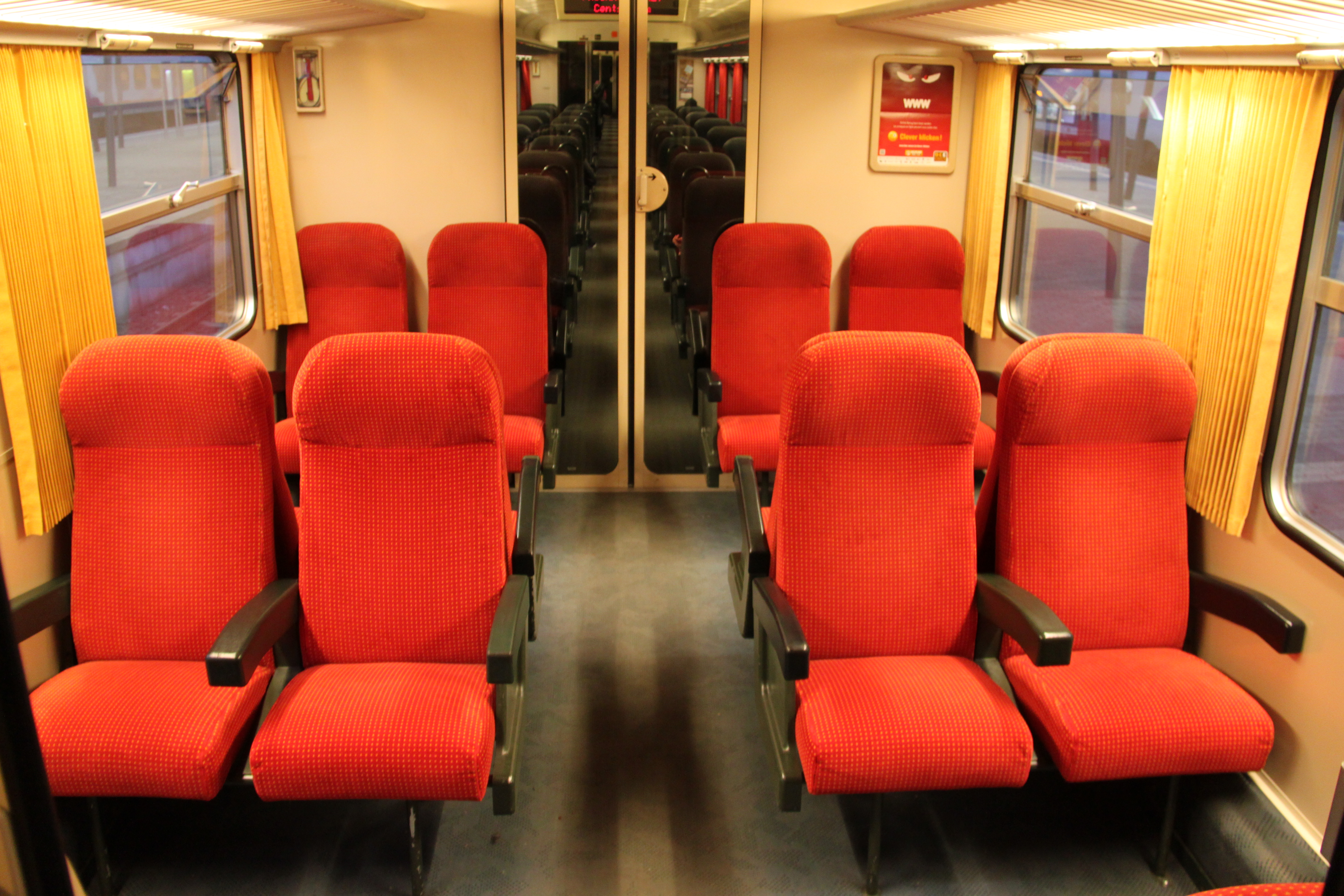
First class interior.

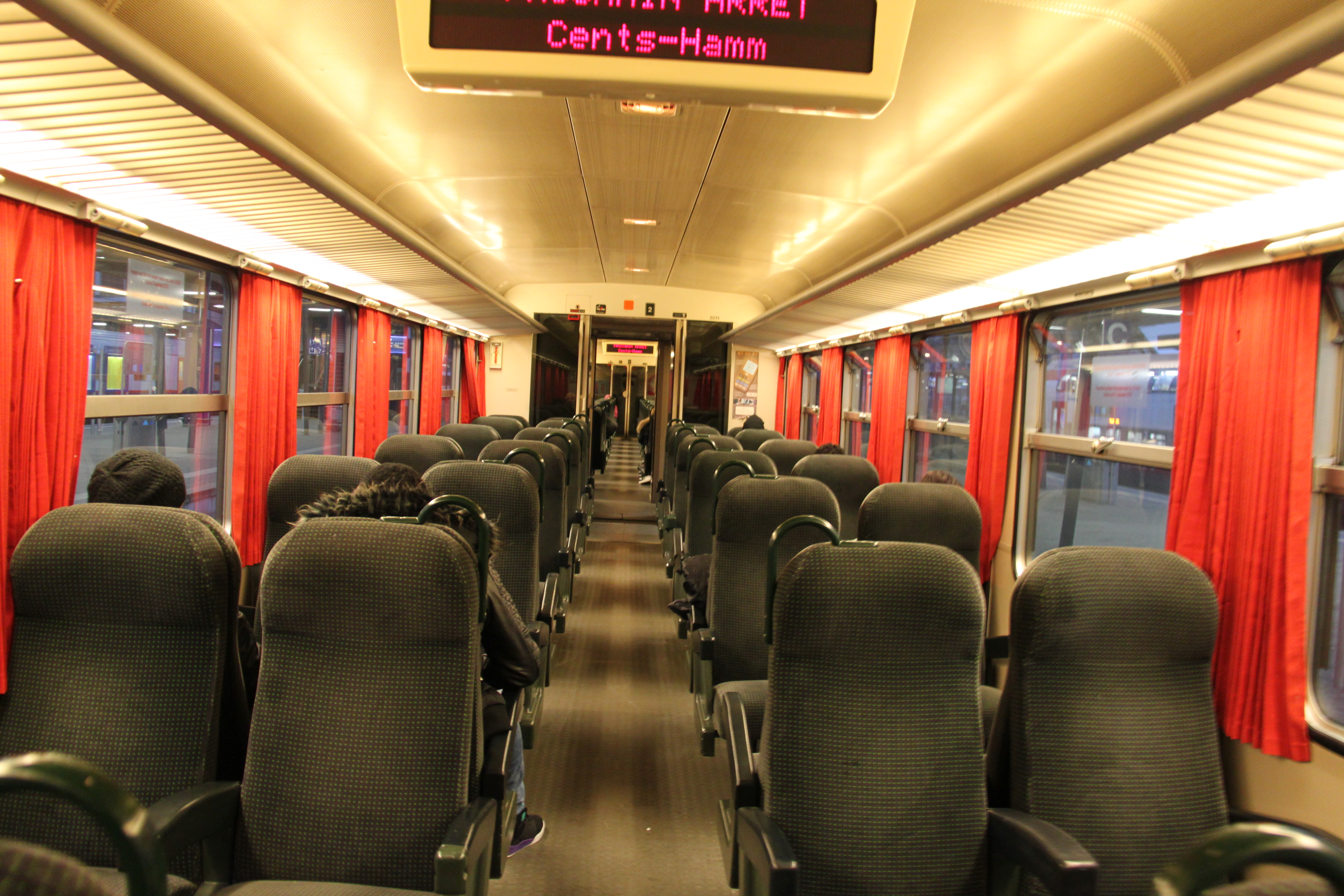
Second class interior.
