= 2450 class =

2450 class or Class 2450 may refer to:

- CFL Class 2450, electric multiple units
- Queensland Railways 2450 class, diesel-electric locomotives
