= Goebelsmuhle =

Coordinates: 49°55′N 6°03′E

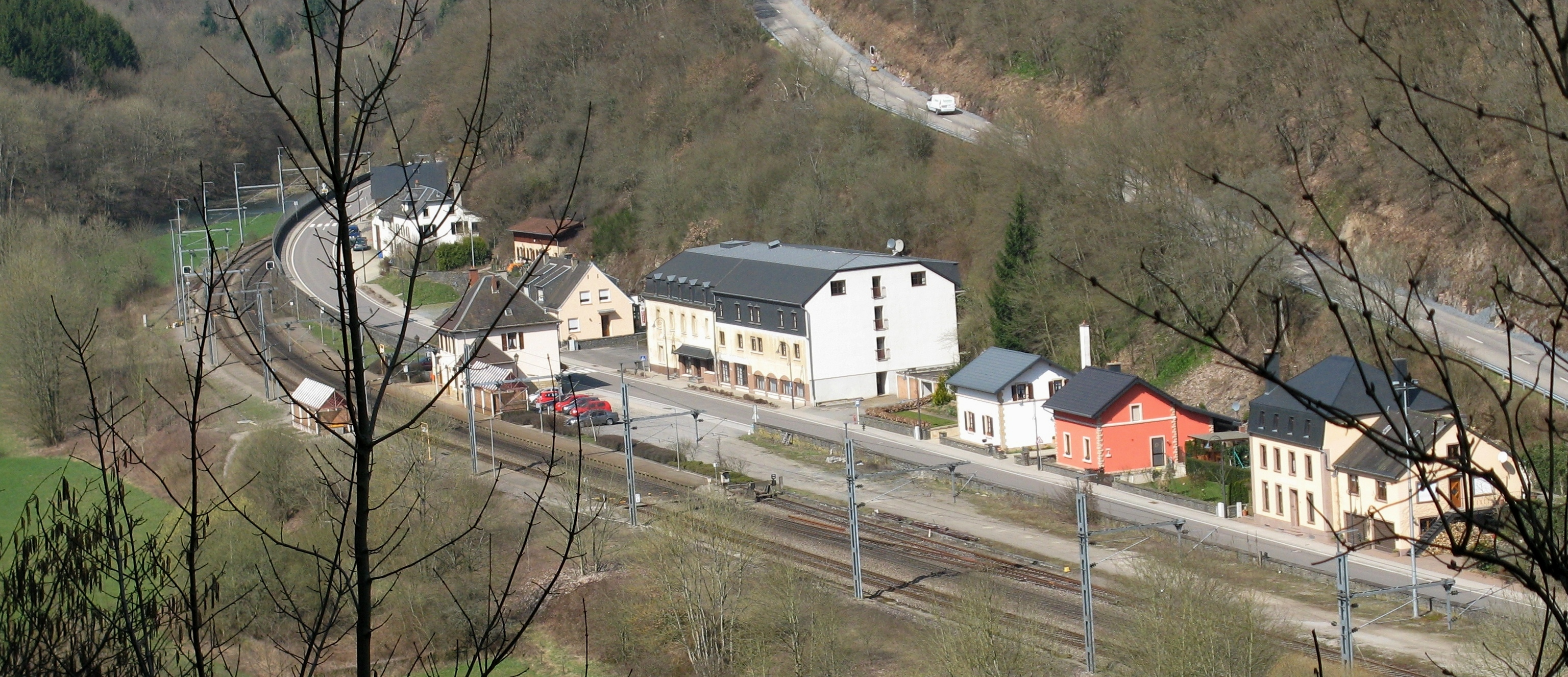
Goebelsmuhle seen from the hill Schinneschschleed

Goebelsmuhle (Luxembourgish: Giewelsmillen, German: Goebelsmühle) is a village in the commune of Bourscheid, in north-eastern Luxembourg. As of September 2026, the village had a population of 30. Nearby is the confluence of the Sauer and the Wiltz.

It is served by Goebelsmuhle railway station, which lies on CFL Line 10.
