= Michelau railway station =

Railway station in Luxembourg

Michelau Méchela
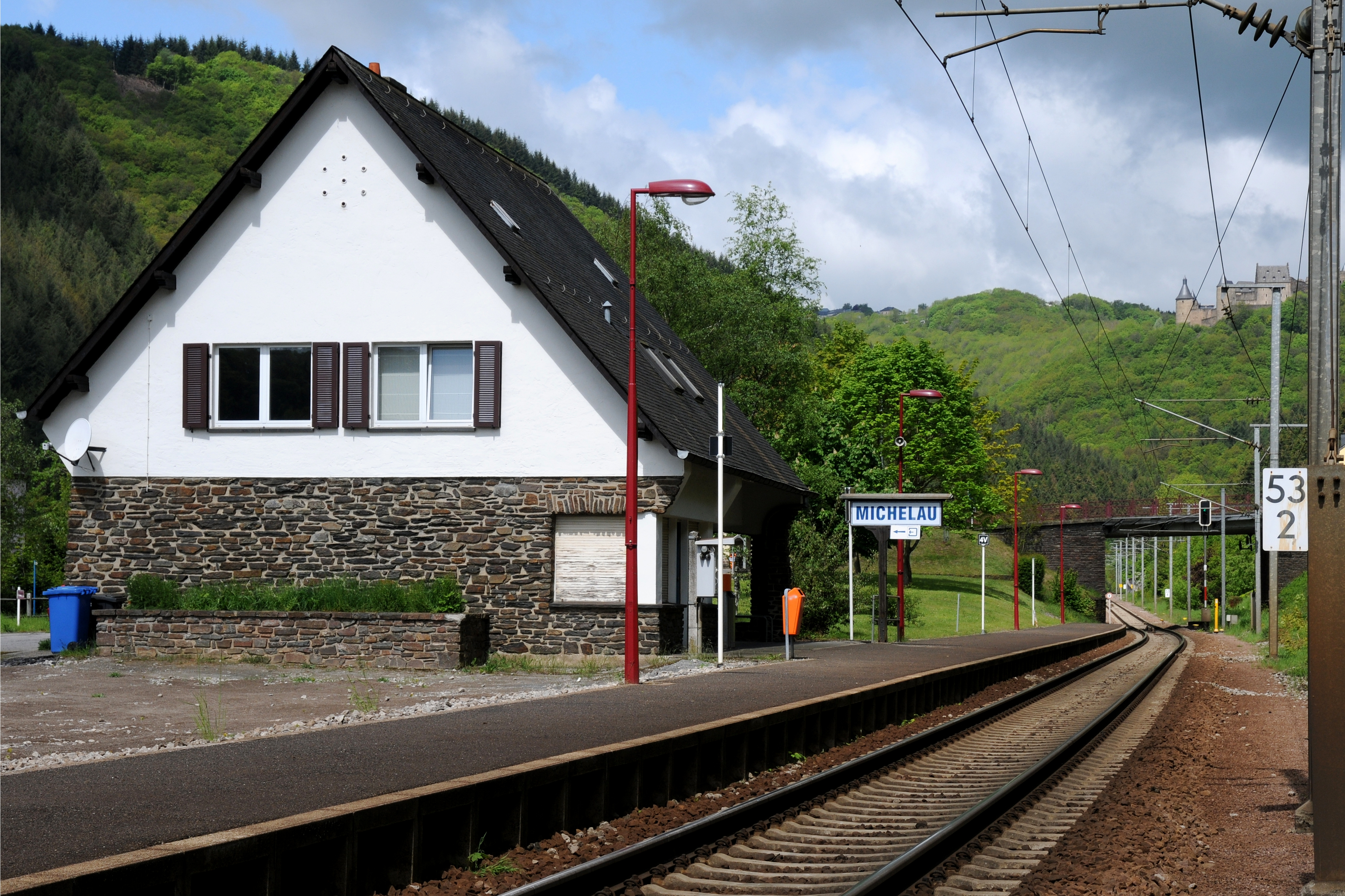

General information
- Location: Rue Principale; 9172 Michelau; Luxembourg
- Coordinates: 49°53′48″N 06°05′32″E
- Operator: CFL, SNCB
- Line: CFL Line 10
- Platforms: 1
- Tracks: 1
- Connections: RGTR bus line 135

Construction
- Parking: 59 parking spaces
- Cycle facilities: 7 bicycle parking spaces; 16 bikebox cycle spaces

Other information
- Website: CFL

History
- Opened: 10 May 1874

Passengers
- 2022: 41,213
- Rank: 56 of 60

Services
Preceding station	CFL	Following station
Ettelbruck towards Luxembourg	Line 10	Goebelsmuhle towards Troisvierges
Location

Michelau railway station (Luxembourgish: Gare Méchela, French: Gare de Michelau) is a railway station serving the village of Michelau, in the commune of Bourscheid, in northern Luxembourg. It is operated by Chemins de Fer Luxembourgeois, the state-owned railway company.

The station is situated on Line 10, which connects Luxembourg City to the centre and north of the country.
