= Kautenbach railway station =

Railway station in Luxembourg

Kautenbach Kautebaach
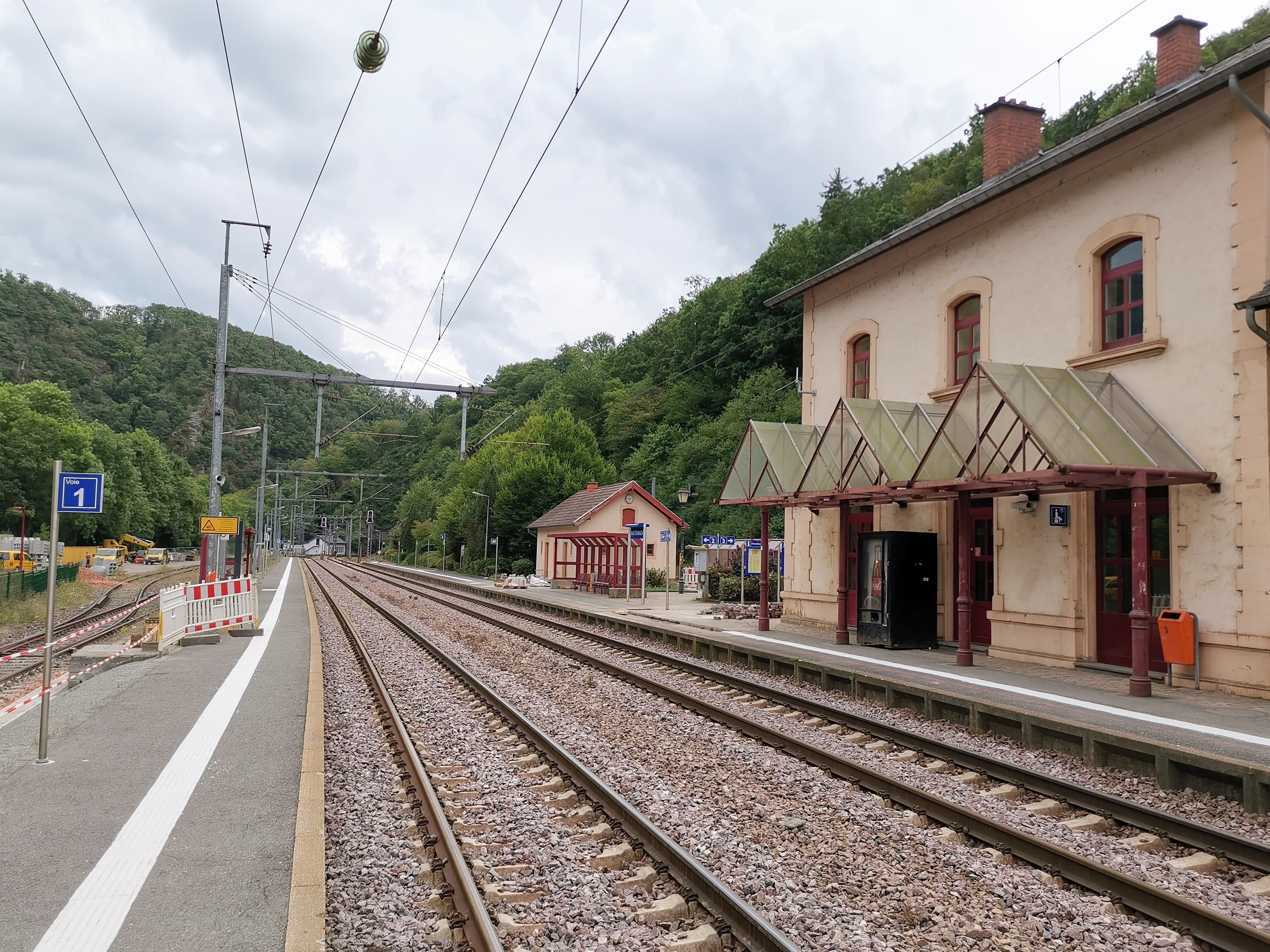

General information
- Location: Gare; 9633 Kautenbach; Luxembourg
- Coordinates: 49°56′54″N 06°01′20″E
- Operator: Chemins de Fer Luxembourgeois, SNCB
- Line: CFL Line 10
- Platforms: 2
- Tracks: 3
- Connections: RGTR bus lines 146 and 153

Construction
- Parking: 92 parking spaces
- Cycle facilities: 16 bikebox parking spaces; 7 bicycle parking spaces

Other information
- Website: CFL

History
- Opened: 15 December 1866

Passengers
- 2022: 595,008 (Note: This figure is likely inflated due to the necessity to change trains at Kautenbach in order to reach Wiltz.)
- Rank: 13 of 60

Services
Preceding station	CFL	Following station
Goebelsmuhle towards Luxembourg	Line 10	Wilwerwiltz towards Troisvierges
Terminus	Line 10	Merkholtz towards Wiltz
Preceding station	NMBS/SNCB	Following station
Michelau towards Luxembourg	IC 33	Wilwerwiltz towards Liers
Location

Kautenbach railway station (Luxembourgish: Gare Kautebaach, French: Gare de Kautenbach, German: Bahnhof Kautenbach) is a railway station serving Kautenbach, in the commune of Kiischpelt, in northern Luxembourg. It is operated by Chemins de Fer Luxembourgeois, the state-owned railway company.

The station is situated on Line 10, which connects Luxembourg City to the centre and north of the country. Kautenbach is a junction, with the main line heading further northwards, towards Gouvy, and a branch line connecting to Wiltz.
