= Ettelbruck railway station =

Railway station in Luxembourg

Ettelbruck Ettelbréck
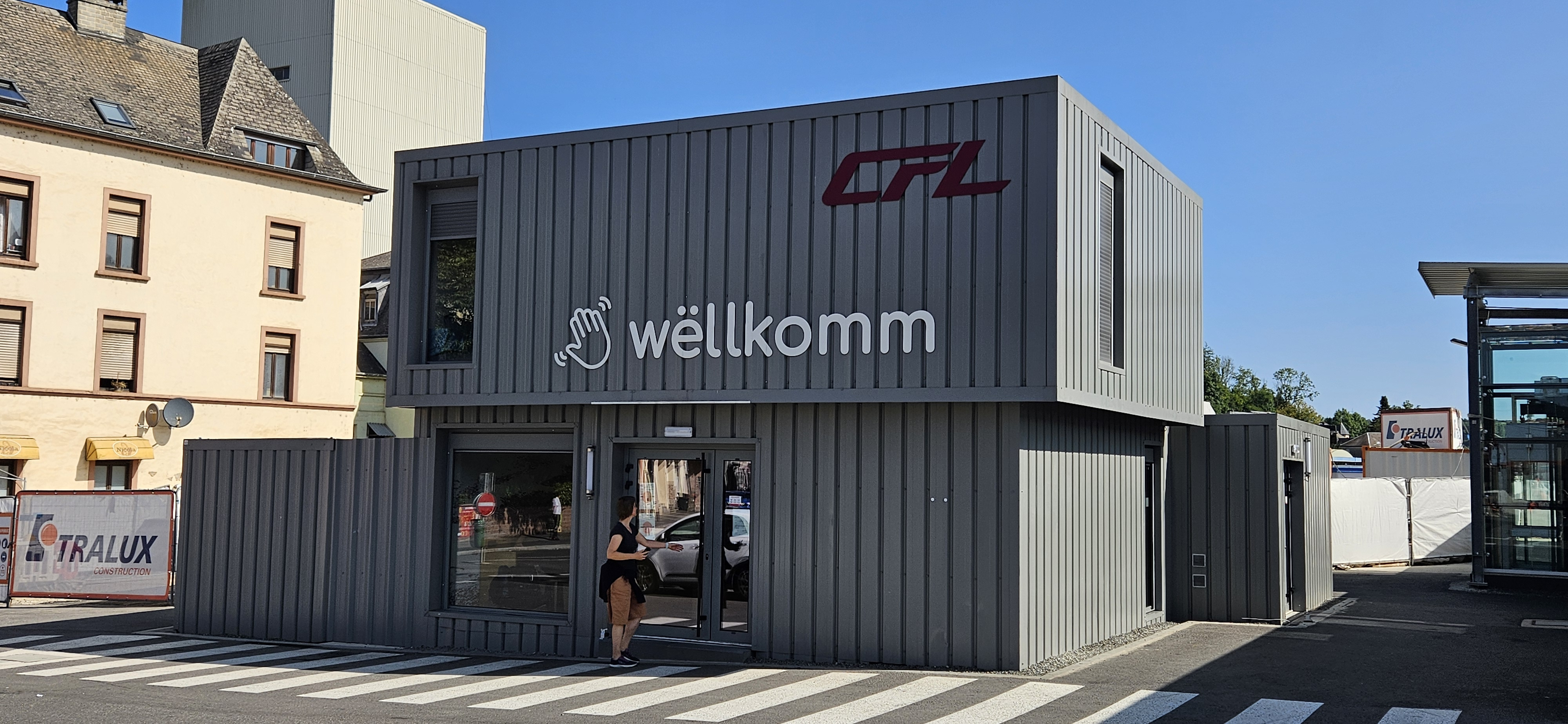
- The station's temporary passenger facilities

General information
- Location: 1, place de la Gare; 9044 Ettelbruck; Luxembourg
- Coordinates: 49°50′53″N 06°06′26″E
- Operator: Chemins de Fer Luxembourgeois
- Line: CFL Line 10
- Platforms: 3
- Tracks: 3
- Connections: RGTR bus lines 113, 114, 115, 116, 117, 118, 119, 130, 131, 132, 133, 134, 135, 136, 137, 170, 174, 180, 181, 188, 190, 191, 250, 935, 941, 942 an d950

Construction
- Cycle facilities: 32 bikebox cycle spaces

Other information
- Website: CFL

History
- Opened: 21 July 1862

Passengers
- 2022: 1,768,952
- Rank: 4 of 60

Services
Preceding station	CFL	Following station
Mersch towards Luxembourg	Line 10	Michelau towards Troisvierges
Schieren towards Luxembourg	Line 10	Diekirch Terminus
Preceding station	NMBS/SNCB	Following station
Mersch towards Luxembourg	IC 33	Michelau towards Liers
Location

Ettelbruck railway station (Luxembourgish: Gare Ettelbréck, French: Gare de Ettelbruck, German: Bahnhof Ettelbrück) is a railway station serving Ettelbruck, in central Luxembourg. It is operated by Chemins de Fer Luxembourgeois, the state-owned railway company.

The station is situated on Line 10, which connects Luxembourg City to the centre and north of the country. Ettelbruck is a junction, with the main line heading further northwards, towards Gouvy and Wiltz, and a branch line connecting to Diekirch.

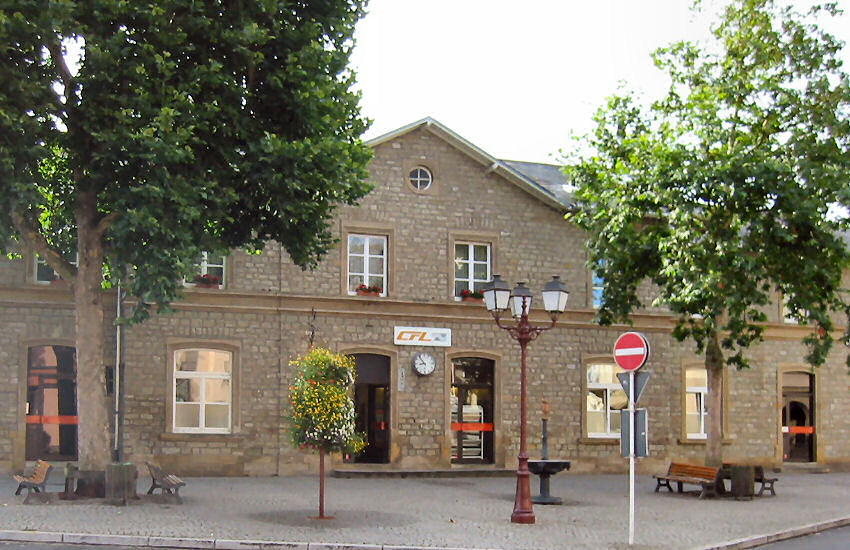
The original station building, demolished in 2022

The original station was completed in 1862. In 2014, the Chamber of Deputies voted in favour of modernizing the station, including replacing the original station building, at a cost of €156.5 million. The old station was demolished in 2022, and as of November 2025, the wider project, which also includes a road underpass and a large youth hostel, is due to be completed between 2027 and 2029.

As of 2022, it was the fourth-busiest station in Luxembourg, with over 1.7 million passengers that year.
