= SNCF Class Z 11500 =

Class of French electric multiple unit trains

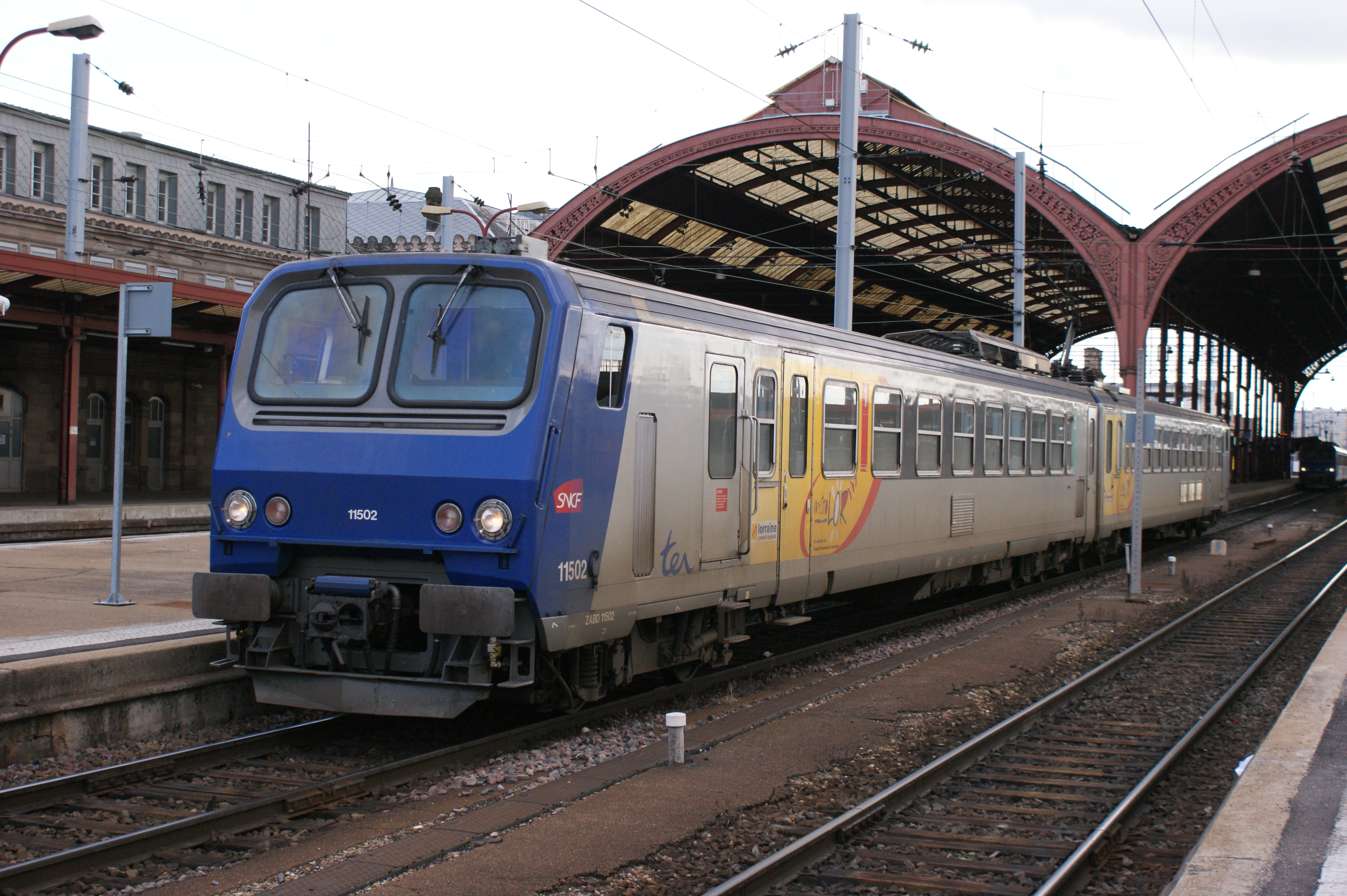
Z 11500 two-car unit at Strasbourg-Ville station in March 2009.

The SNCF Class Z 11500 is a model of electric multiple unit (EMU) train that was built by Alsthom in 1986–87. They are in service with TER Grand Est. These trains are similar to the CFL Class 2000 of the Luxembourg railways.
