= Belgian Railways Class 08 =

NMBS/SNCB Class 08 Siemens Desiro
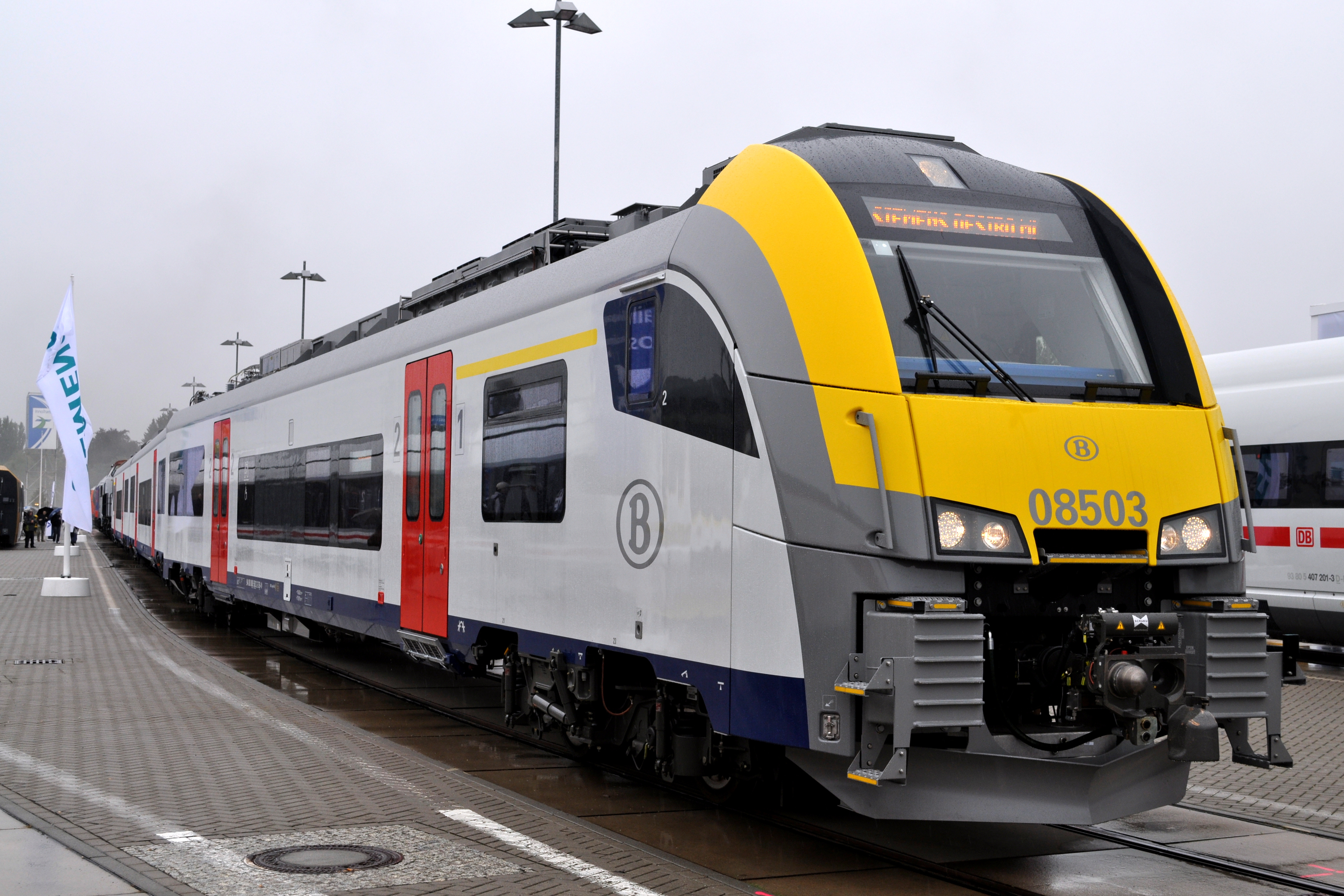
- Train 08503 during InnoTrans 2010 in Berlin
- Stock type: Electric multiple unit
- Manufacturer: Siemens Mobility, Bombardier Transportation
- Constructed: 2010-2015
- Number built: 305
- Fleet numbers: 08001-08210; 08501-08595
- Operators: SNCB/NMBS

Specifications
- Gearbox: ZF E-S 20 A-N
- Electric system(s): 08001-08210: 3 kV DC; 08501-08595: 25 kV AC, 3 kV DC
- Current collection: Pantograph
- Track gauge: 1,435 mm (4 ft 8 1/2 in) standard gauge

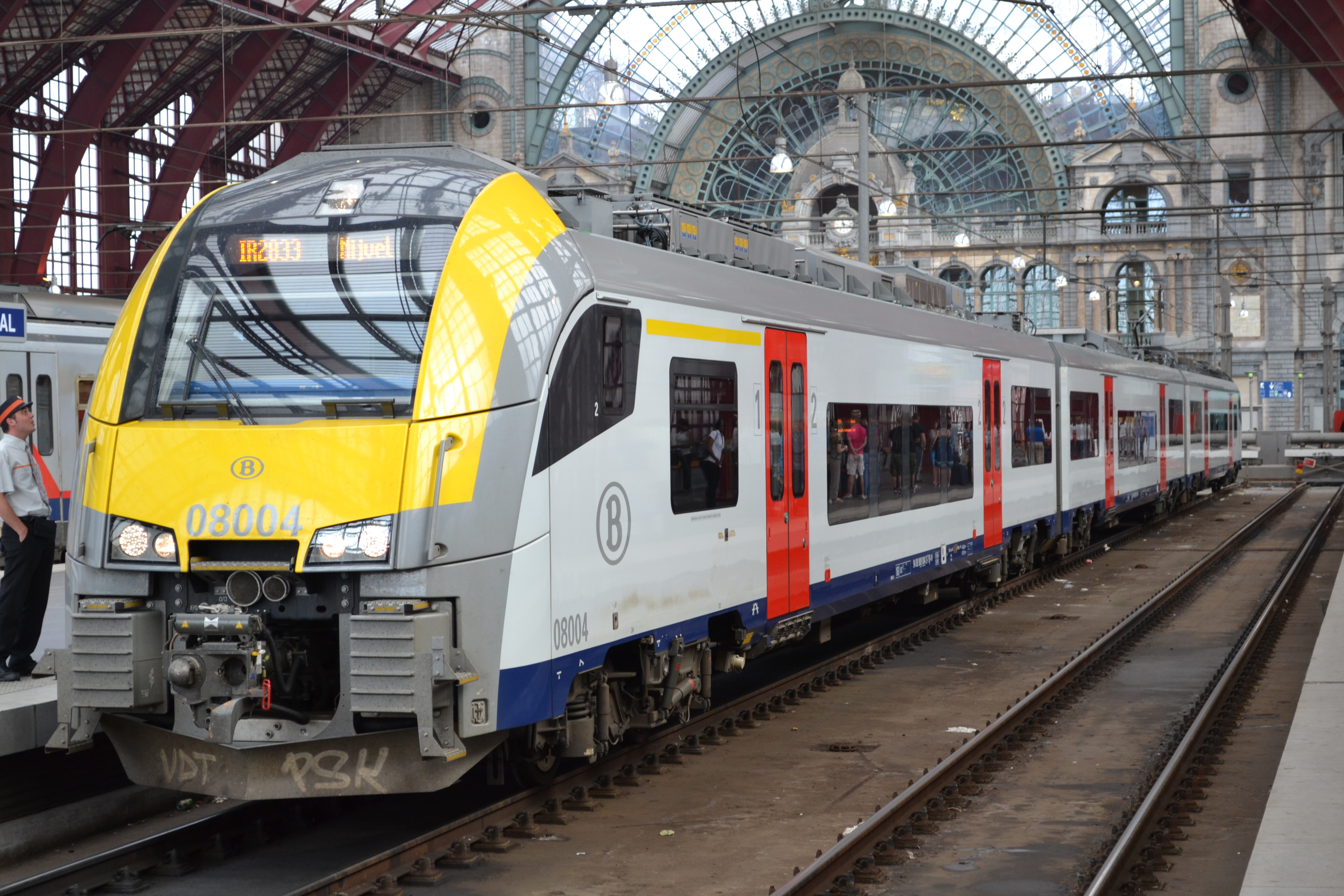

The AM/MR08 series is a three-part electric multiple unit of the Siemens type Desiro Main Line (Desiro ML), a so-called lightweight train with a low-floor section for regional passenger transport and local passenger transport for the National Railway Company of Belgium(SNCB/NMBS). They were originally intended for the Brussels Regional Express Network but have been deployed on L (local), S-train and IC (InterCity) train services across Belgium.

== History ==
In 2008, the board of directors of the Belgian national railway company NMBS decided to purchase 305 electric multiple units of the "Desiro ML" type from Siemens. With a value of 1.291 billion euros, this is the largest investment file ever for the NMBS. The ordered carriages have a total of 85,400 seats and were delivered between the spring of 2011 and the end of 2016, at a rate of five to eight sets per month.

The train set was developed by Siemens Mobility from the Desiro MainLine intended for the north western Germany region. Siemens Mobility built 105 trainsets, with the remaining 200 sets built by Bombardier Transportation at their Brugge facilities.

During the open days of the NMBS workshops over five weekends from September 24 to October 23, 2011, the trainsets were officially presented to the public.

On 1 October 2013, the NMBS requested guarantees from Siemens in response to the worldwide announced personnel adjustments of the German multinational and whether this would have any consequences for the delivery and follow-up of 305 trains to the NMBS as well as the quality follow-up of 120 locomotives already delivered.

On March 19, 2015, the trainsets 08594 and 08595 were the last of a total of 305 trainsets delivered to NMBS by Siemens Mobility.

== Interior ==
They have provisions for accommodating wheelchairs and strollers and for storing bicycles. The seats are for the most part in a coach arrangement. Overhead luggage racks are also provided. There are 230V~ sockets for connecting a laptop or a phone charger. Mobile Internet reception has been severely weakened by the electromagnetic shielding of three-layer glass and the thermal insulation of the walls. In the first class, the seats have folding tables. There is also a toilet, with wheel-chair access.

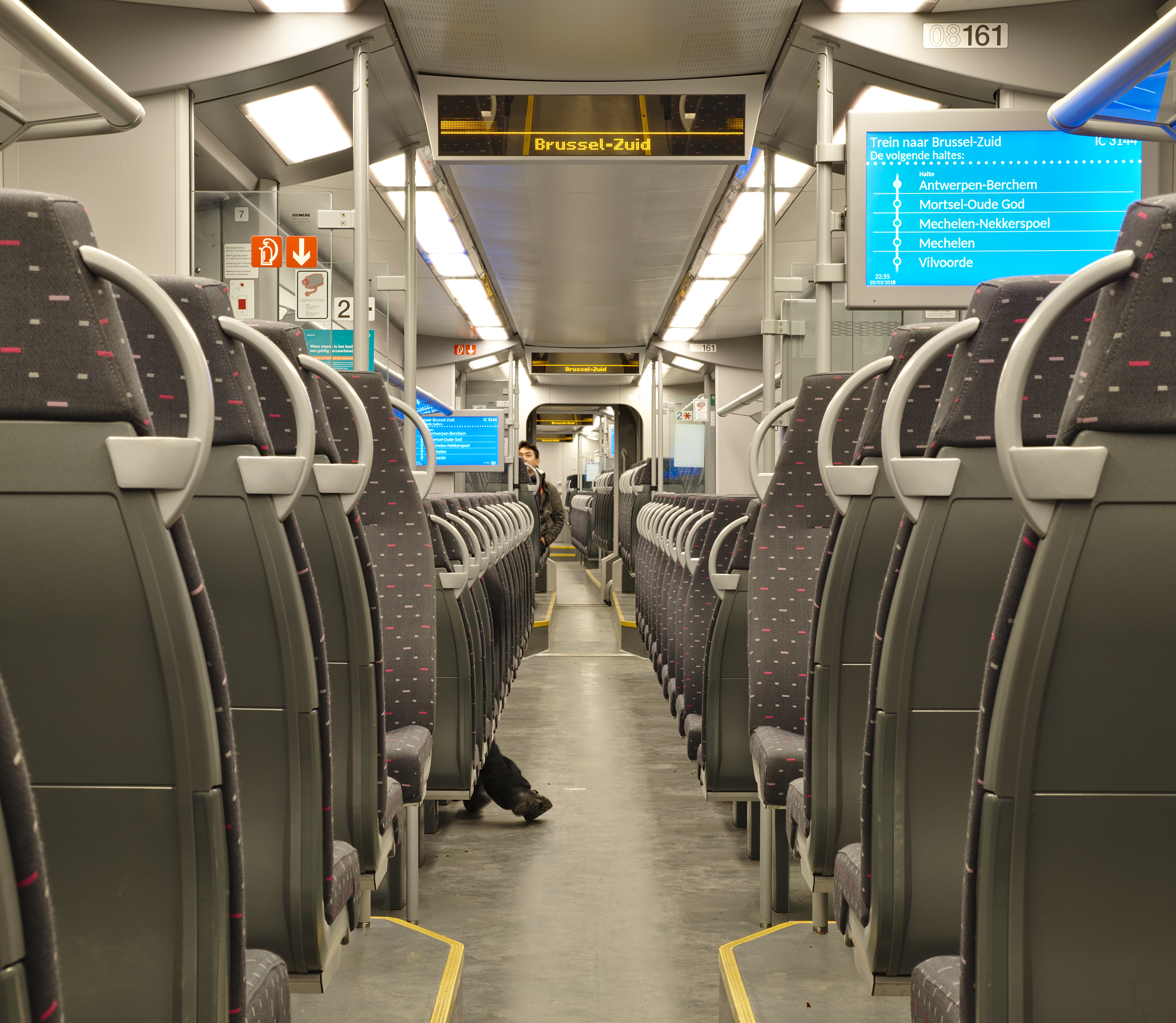
Interior of NMBS/SNCB 08 Desiro ML at Antwerp Central Station

The exterior doors only open when the traveller presses the "open" button. These doors have a motion sensor that automatically closes them when no people are detected for more than five seconds. This is to promote the proper functioning of the climate control system. There are no interior doors, but there are fire doors between the carriages that close automatically in the event of a fire.
