= CFL Line 10 =

Railway line in Luxembourg

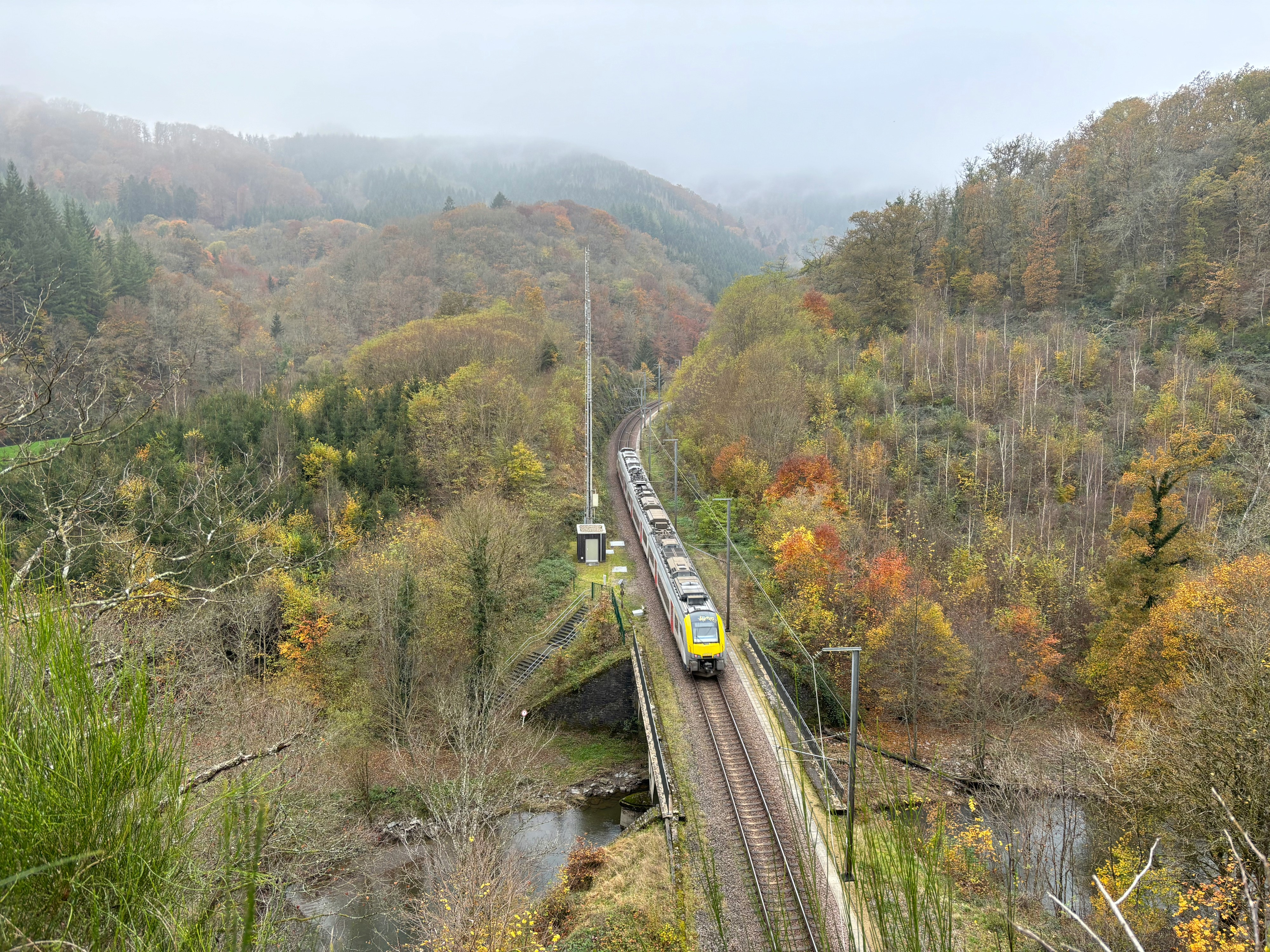
- An SNCB Class 08 between Kautenbach and Goebelsmuhle on Line 10

Overview
- Status: Operational
- Locale: Luxembourg, Belgium
- Termini: Liège-Guillemins; Luxembourg

Service
- Services: 1
- Operator(s): CFL

Technical
- Number of tracks: double track
- Track gauge: 1,435 mm (4 ft 8 1/2 in) standard gauge
- Electrification: 1956 (3 kV DC); 2018 (25 kV AC)

Line 10 is a Luxembourgish railway line connecting Luxembourg City to the centre and north of the country, as well as on to Liège, in Belgium. The terminus at the southern end is Luxembourg railway station, whilst the terminals at the northern end are Diekirch, Wiltz, Troisvierges and Liège. It is designated and predominantly operated by the Société Nationale des Chemins de Fer Luxembourgeois (CFL).

== History ==
On 21 July 1862, the Chemins de fer de l'Est opened the line section from Luxembourg railway station to Ettelbruck railway station to commercial traffic. On 15 December 1866, the line was extended to Troisvierges railway station before reaching the Belgian border and Gouvy railway station on 20 February 1867.

The line was electrified in the late 1980s and early 1990s, with Luxembourg also funding the electrification and upgrade of the Belgian Line 42 to Liège. During a planned closure of the line in August 2022, the roof of the Schieburg Tunnel collapsed. The line was therefore closed for over a year while the tunnel was repaired, substantially increasing journey times in the region.

== Route ==
The route of CFL Line 10 starts in Liege and heads east across the Meuse, before arriving in Angleur and heading south alongside the Ourthe. The route then heads east along the Ambléve until it reaches Coo, then heading south along the Glain until it reaches Bovigny, then heading south to Gouvy, then crossing the Belgium-Luxembourg border. The route then follows the Woltz river, and then the Clerve. From Kautenbach, the line follows the Wiltz, with a branch following the Wiltz to Wiltz. Near Goebelsmuhle, the Wiltz and Sauer converge, and the line then follows the Sauer. At Ettelbruck, a spur goes to Diekirch along the Sauer, and the main line follows the Alzette to Luxembourg.

== Stations ==
- Luxembourg
- Pfaffenthal-Kirchberg
- Dommeldange
- Walferdange
- Heisdorf
- Lorentzweiler
- Lintgen
- Mersch
- Cruchten
- Colmar-Berg
- Schieren
- Ettelbruck
  - Diekirch
- Michelau
- Goebelsmuhle
- Kautenbach
  - Merkholtz
  - Paradiso
  - Wiltz
- Wilwerwiltz
- Drauffelt
- Clervaux
- Maulusmuhle (closed)
- Troisvierges
- Gouvy (Belgium)
- Vielsalm (Belgium)
- Trois-Ponts (Belgium)
- Coo (Belgium)
- Aywaille (Belgium)
- Rivage (Belgium)
- Poulseur (Belgium)
- Angleur (Belgium)
- Liège-Guillemins (Belgium)
