= Troisvierges railway station =

Railway station in Luxembourg

Troisvierges Ëlwen
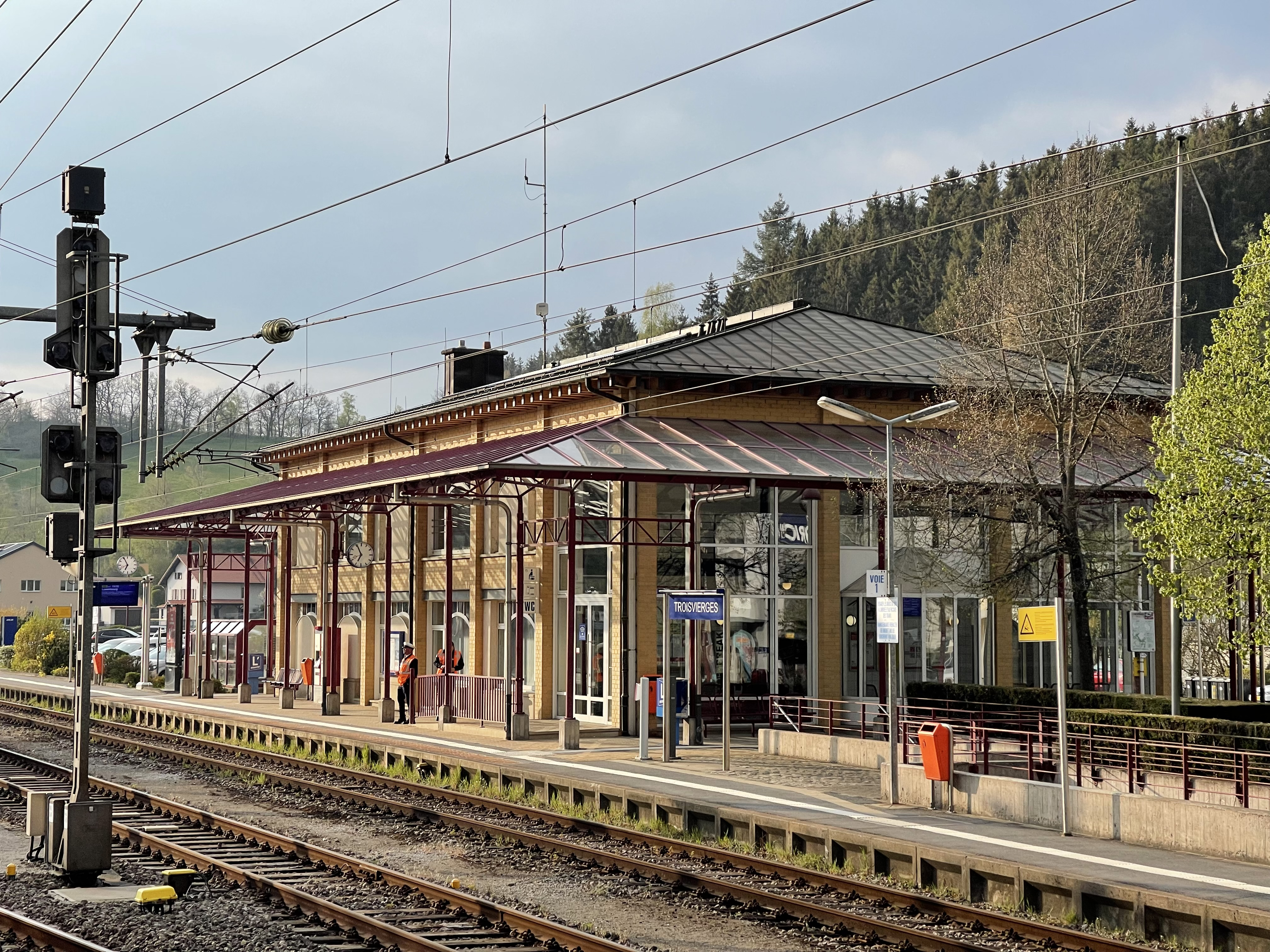

General information
- Location: Rue de la Gare; L-9906 Cruchten
- Coordinates: 50°07′10″N 05°59′28″E
- Operator: CFL, SNCB
- Line: CFL Line 10
- Platforms: 2
- Tracks: 3
- Train operators: CFL
- Connections: RGTR bus lines 140, 162, 171, 172, 173, 174, 175 and 176

Construction
- Parking: 388 parking spaces
- Cycle facilities: 32 bikebox parking spaces; 9 bicycle parking spaces

Other information
- Website: CFL

History
- Opened: 15 December 1866

Passengers
- 2022: 261,756
- Rank: 22 of 60

Services
Preceding station	CFL	Following station
Clervaux towards Luxembourg	Line 10	Terminus
Preceding station	NMBS/SNCB	Following station
Clervaux towards Luxembourg	IC 33	Gouvy towards Liers
Location

Troisvierges railway station (Luxembourgish: Gare Ëlwen, French: Gare de Troisvierges}) is a railway station serving Troisvierges, in northern Luxembourg. It is operated by Chemins de Fer Luxembourgeois, the state-owned railway company.

The station is situated on Line 10, which connects Luxembourg City to the centre and north of the country. It is the last station on the line in Luxembourg, before it passes into Belgium on its way to Gouvy. From 1889 it was also connected with Belgium via the Vennbahn, and through Belgium to Germany.

Troisvierges station was the disembarkment point of German soldiers on 1 August 1914, at the outset of the First World War. This action was the first encroachment upon Luxembourg's sovereignty during the conflict, during which Germany occupied Luxembourg for over four years. It can be said to be the first military action on the Western front.

== Gallery ==
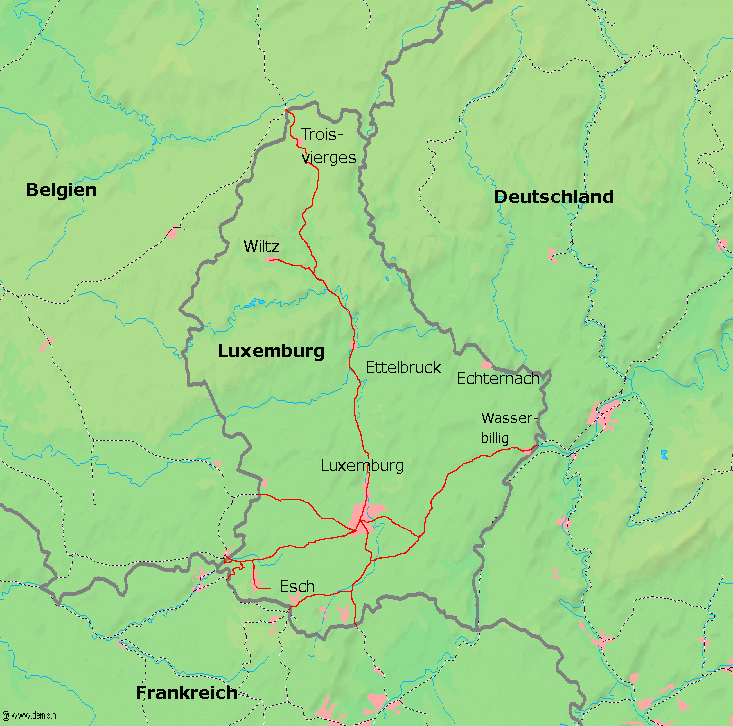
Map of current railways in Luxembourg: Troisvierges near northern border with Belgium

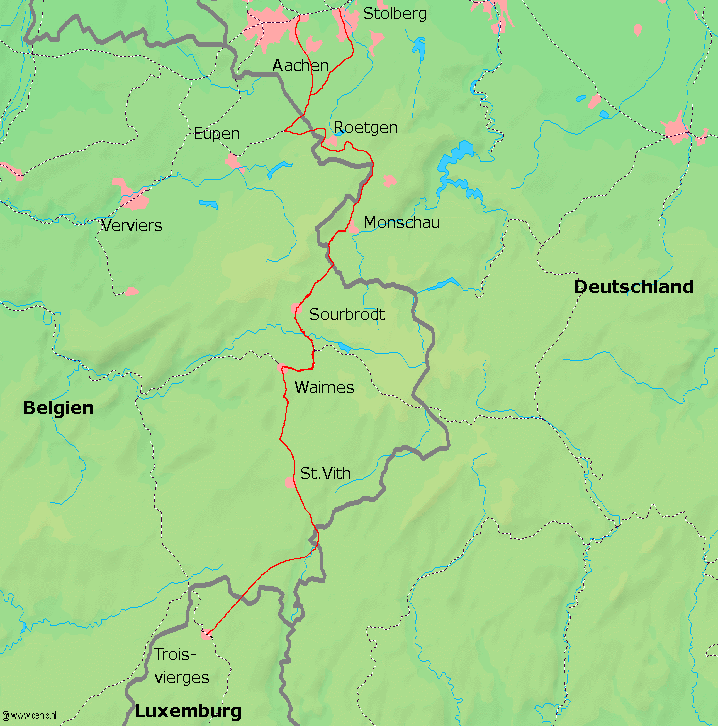
Line of Venn railway connecting Troisvierges with Belgium and Germany, now dismantled

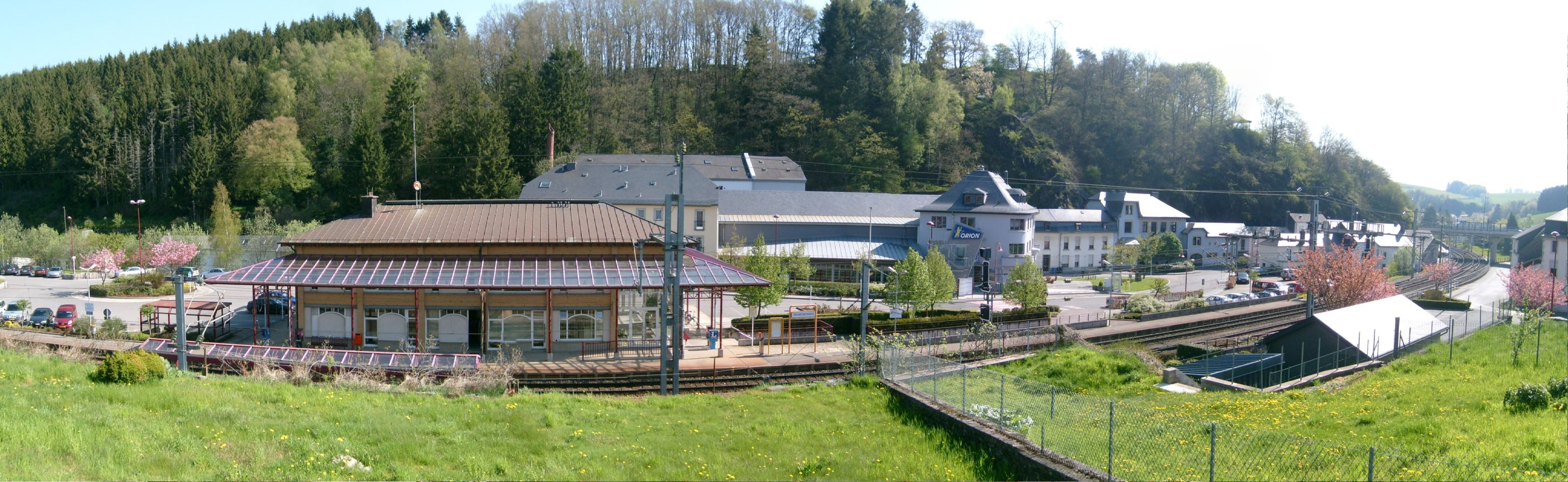
Troisvierges railway station panorama
