= Diekirch railway station =

Railway station in Luxembourg

Coordinates: 49°51′53″N 06°09′14″E

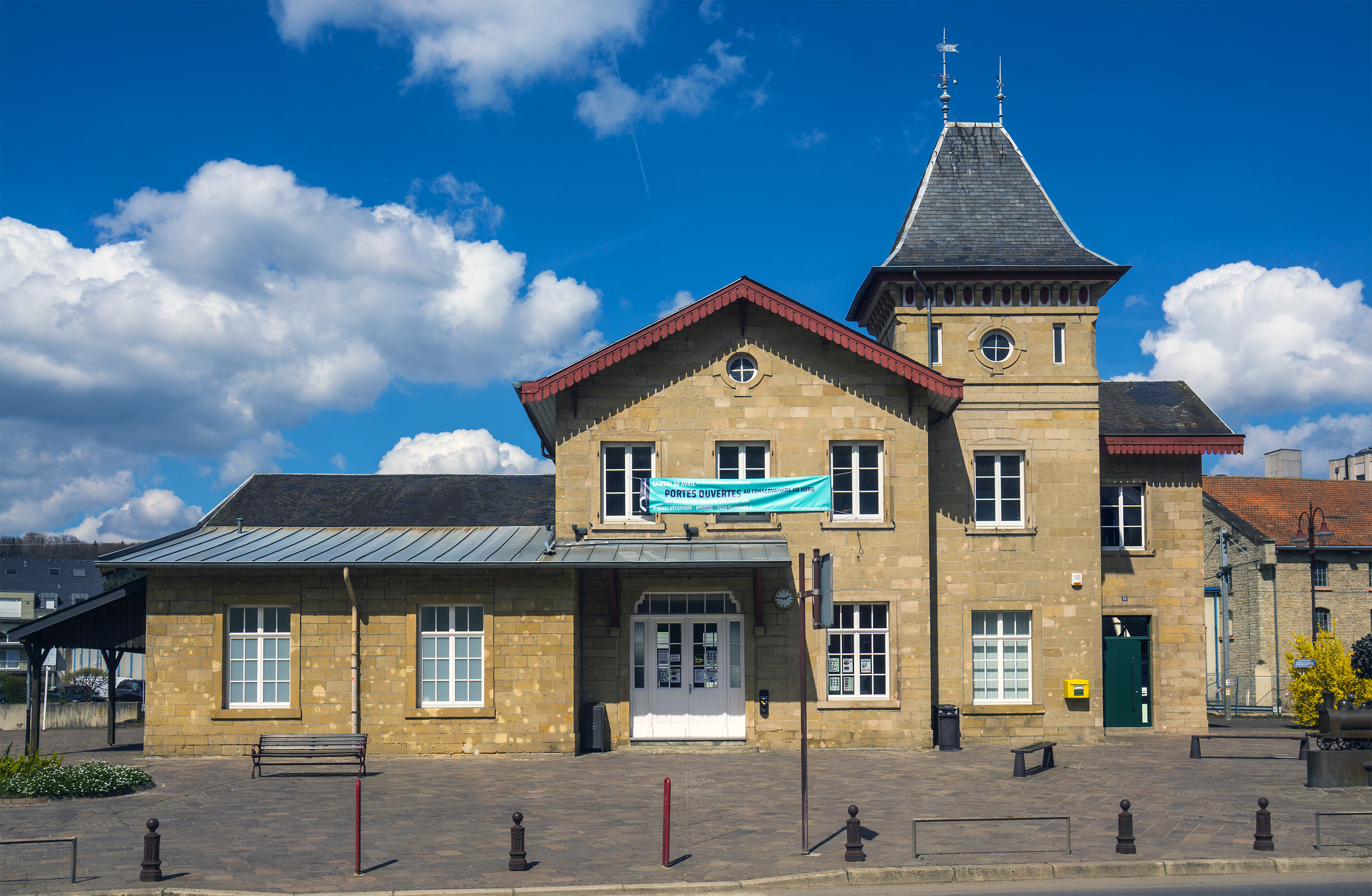
Diekirch railway station

Diekirch railway station (Luxembourgish: Gare Dikrech, French: Gare de Diekirch, German: Bahnhof Diekirch) is a railway station serving Diekirch, in north-eastern Luxembourg. It is operated by Chemins de Fer Luxembourgeois, the state-owned railway company.

The station is situated on a branch of the Line 10, which connects Luxembourg City to the centre and north of the country. It is the sole station of the Diekirch branch, which divides from the main line at Ettelbruck.

Preceding station	CFL	Following station
Ettelbruck towards Luxembourg	Line 10	Terminus
