= Société Nationale des Chemins de Fer Luxembourgeois =

State-owned railway company of Luxembourg

Société Nationale des Chemins de Fer Luxembourgeois (CFL)
- Type: Government-owned corporation
- Industry: Rail transport
- Founded: 14 May 1946; 80 years ago
- Headquarters: Luxembourg City, Luxembourg
- Area served: Luxembourg, parts of Belgium, France, Germany
- Key people: Jeannot Waringo, President; Marc Wengler, Director-General
- Products: Rail transport, Cargo transport
- Revenue: ▲€1.073 billion (2022)
- Operating income: ▲€4.4 million (2013)
- Net income: ▼€13 million (2022)
- Owner: 94% Luxembourgish state, 4% Belgian state, 2% French state
- Number of employees: ▲5,000 (2023)
- Website: www.cfl.lu

Chemins de Fer Luxembourgeois
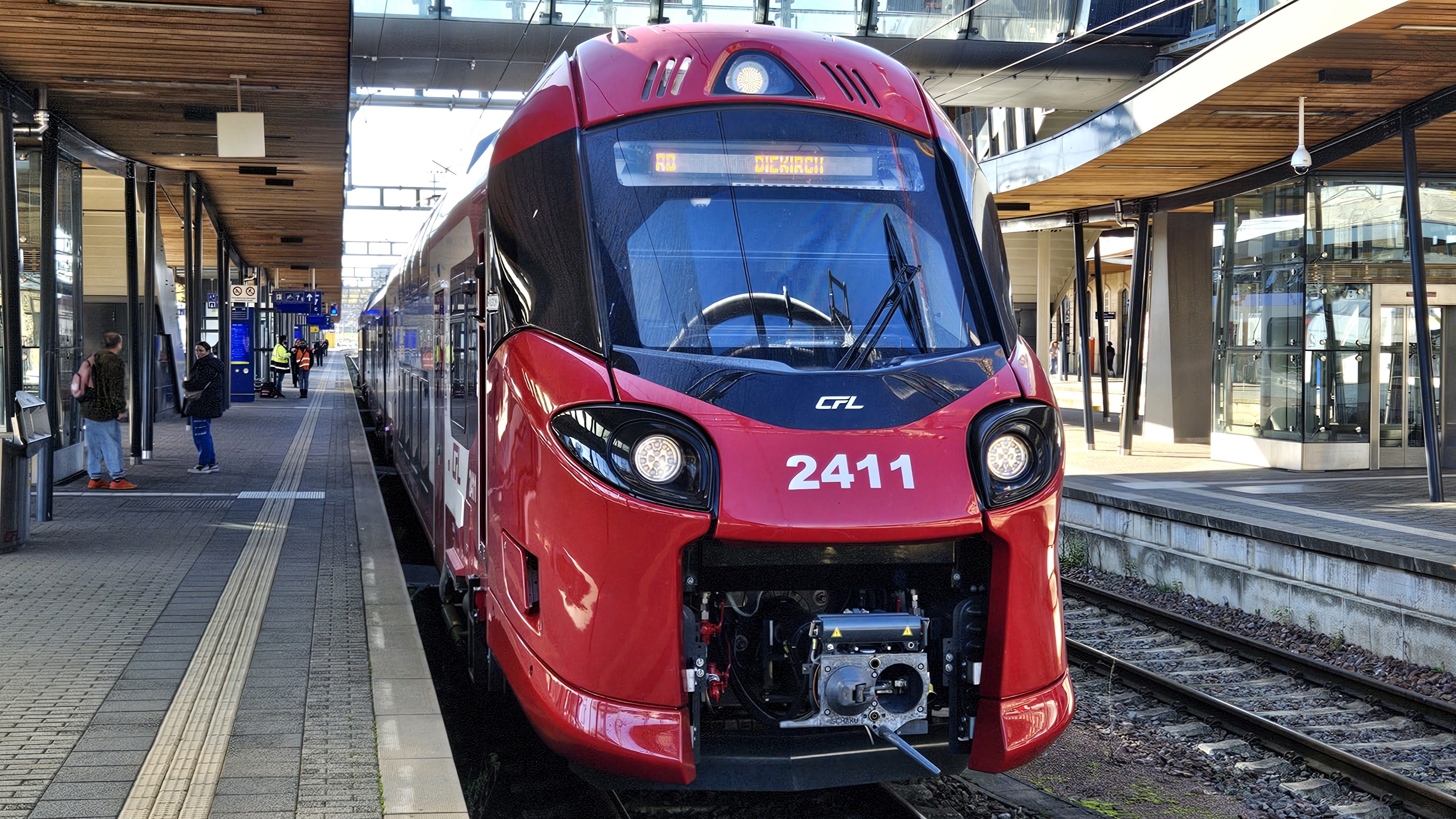
- CFL Class 2400 train at Luxembourg station.

Operation
- National railway: Chemins de Fer Luxembourgeois

Statistics
- Ridership: ▲31.4 million (2025)
- Passenger-distance: ▲388.8 million (2022)
- Freight: ▼2,438 million tonnes kilometres (2022)

System length
- Total: 630 km (391 mi)
- Double track: 140 km (87 mi)
- Electrified: 574 km (357 mi)

Track gauge
- Main: 1,435 mm (4 ft 8 1/2 in)
- High-speed: 1,435 mm (4 ft 8 1/2 in)

Electrification
- 25 kV 50 Hz AC: 576 km (358 mi)

Features
Map
- Map of the Luxembourgish rail network

The Société Nationale des Chemins de Fer Luxembourgeois (French pronunciation: [sɔsjete nɑsjɔnal de ʃ(ə)mɛ̃ də fɛʁ lyksɑ̃buʁʒwa]; Luxembourg National Railway Company; abbr. CFL [seɛfɛl]) is the national railway company of Luxembourg. In 2025, it carried approximately 31.4 million passengers. As of 2023, the company employs around 5,000 people, making CFL the country's largest corporate employer.

The Luxembourg rail system comprises 275 route-kilometres (170 miles), of which 140 kilometres (87 mi) is double track and 135 kilometres (84 mi) single track. Of the total track length of 617 kilometres (383 mi), 576 kilometres (358 mi) are electrified at 25 kV, 50 Hz.

Luxembourg borders Belgium, France and Germany. Correspondingly, there are cross-border services into these countries. Some are wholly run by CFL, whereas others are run by SNCF, NMBS/SNCB and DB. CFL passenger trains cover most of the network.

CFL operates most of its passenger trains using EMUs and electric locomotives with push-pull stock. The company also has a fleet of diesel locomotives for hauling freight trains and for general shunting purposes.

Luxembourg is a member of the International Union of Railways (UIC). The UIC Country Code for Luxembourg is 82.

== History ==
CFL is the result of a nationalisation of private railway companies in 1946.

== CFL operations and services ==
=== Passenger train routes ===
CFL advertises its passenger network as made up of seven lines:

- Line 10 Luxembourg – Troisvierges-Frontière – Liège (Belgium), Kautenbach – Wiltz and Ettelbrück – Diekirch
- Line 30 Luxembourg – Wasserbillig-Frontière – Trier (Germany)
- Line 50 Luxembourg – Kleinbettingen-Frontière – Brussels (Belgium)
- Line 60 Luxembourg – Esch-sur-Alzette – Rodange, Bettembourg – Volmerange-les-Mines (France), Noetzange – Rumelange and Esch-sur-Alzette – Audun-le-Tiche (France)
- Line 70 Luxembourg – Rodange – Athus (Belgium), Rodange – Longwy (France)
- Line 90 Luxembourg – Thionville (France) – Metz (France) – Nancy (France)

Internally it uses a different system with more sub divisions:

- Ligne 1 Luxembourg – Troisvierges-Frontière, 1a Ettelbruck – Diekirch, 1b Kautenbach – Wiltz
- Ligne 2a Kleinbettingen – Steinfort, 2b Ettelbruck – Bissen
- Ligne 3 Luxembourg – Wasserbillig-Frontière via Sandweiler-Contern
- Ligne 4 Luxembourg – Berchem – Oetrange, 4a Luxembourg - Alzingen
- Ligne 5 Luxembourg – Kleinbettingen-Frontière
- Ligne 6 Luxembourg – Bettembourg-Frontière, 6a Bettembourg – Esch/Alzette, 6b Bettembourg – Dudelange-Usines (Volmerange), 6c Noertzange – Rumelange, 6d Tétange – Langengrund, 6e Esch-sur-Alzette – Audun-le-Tiche, 6f Esch-sur-Alzette – Pétange, 6g Pétange – Rodange-Frontière (Aubange), 6h Pétange – Rodange-Frontière (Mont St. Martin), 6j Pétange – Rodange-Frontière (Athus), 6k Brucherberg – Scheuerbusch
- Ligne 7 Luxembourg – Pétange

=== Rail links to adjacent countries ===
All neighbouring countries have 1,435 mm (4 ft 8 1/2 in) standard gauge railways. France uses the same electrification of 25 kV AC. The border crossings with Belgium also use that same voltage at both sides; the transition to 3 kV DC is at 55 to 135 km inside Belgium itself.

- Belgium – change to 3 kV DC (but far inside Belgium)
- France – same voltage and current
- Germany – change to 15 kV AC

=== Ridership ===
Passenger ridership carried on CFL-trains for each fiscal year (x 1000).

- 1938: 9,505
- 1950: 10,607
- 1960: 10,643
- 1970: 12,531
- 1980: 14,053
- 1990: 12,692
- 2000: 12,985
- 2006: 14,793
- 2007: 16,442
- 2008: 17,676
- 2009: 17,039
- 2010: 17,996
- 2011: 18,200
- 2012: 19,834
- 2013: 20,714
- 2014: 21,503
- 2015: 22,496
- 2016: 22,459
- 2017: 22,930
- 2018: 23,331
- 2019: 25,016
- 2020: 14,500
- 2021: 16,600
- 2022: 22,000
- 2023: 28,700
- 2024: 31,300
- 2025: 31,400

Passenger kilometers on CFL-trains for each fiscal year (x 1,000,000).

- 1938: 215
- 1950: 227
- 1960: 230
- 1970: 256
- 1980: 302
- 1990: 261
- 2000: 332
- 2006: 298
- 2007: 233
- 2008: 345
- 2009: 333
- 2010: 347
- 2011: 349
- 2012: 373
- 2013: 385
- 2014: 409
- 2015: 418
- 2016: 417
- 2017: 438
- 2018: 443
- 2019: 463
- 2020: 269
- 2021: 304
- 2022: 389

=== Rolling stock ===
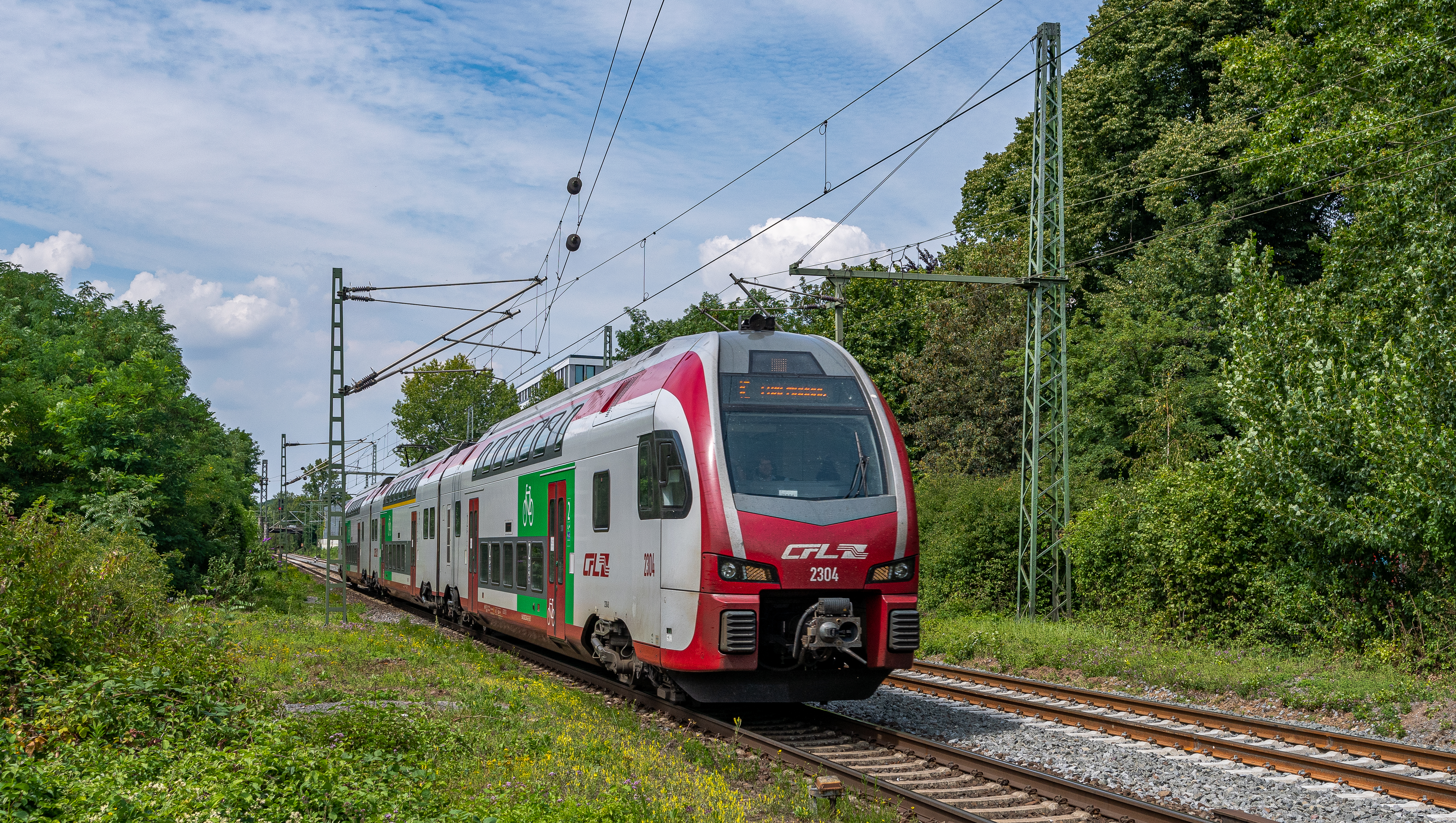
Most CFL-services are operated with modern double-decker trains, such as this Class 2300.

CFL owns a relatively modern fleet of passenger trains, with a majority of double-decker trains. Nearly all routes are operated with electric trains.

- CFL locomotives and rolling stock

== Projects ==
In 2019, doubling of track between Luxembourg railway station and Sandweiler-Contern at a cost of €462 million was completed, following an original planned 2013 opening. A new, more direct, line between Luxembourg and Bettembourg is due to open in 2027.

== Fares ==
CFL trains are free of charge within Luxembourg, with the exception of first class. For international journeys, a ticket is required.

== See also ==
- CFL Cargo Denmark
- Trams in Luxembourg
- Transport in Luxembourg
- Train categories in Luxembourg
