= France–Luxembourg border =

International border

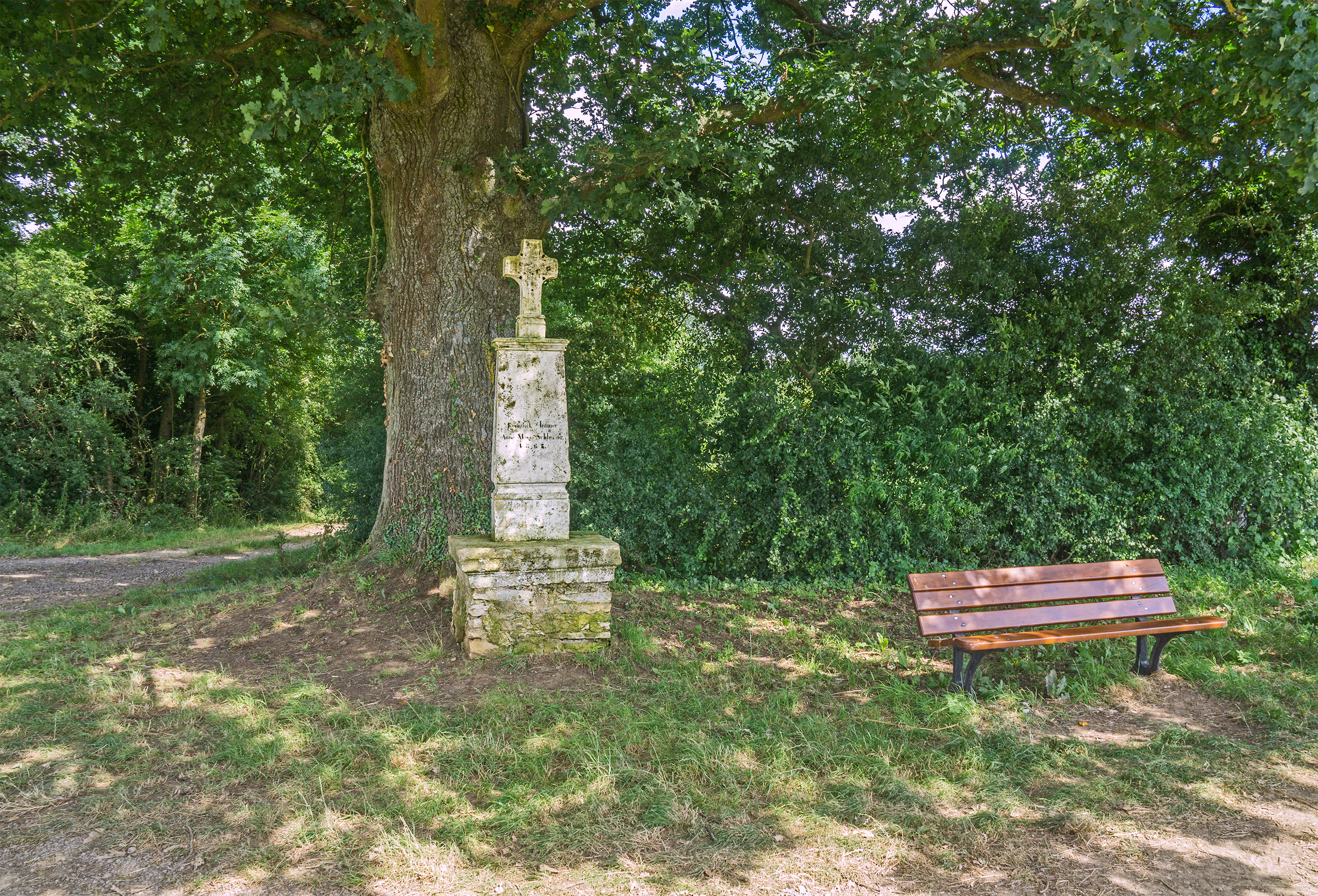

Characteristics
- Entities: France Luxembourg
- Length: 73 kilometres (45 mi)

History
- Current shape: 2007
- Treaties: Convention of 16 May 1769; Convention of 18 November 1779

The France–Luxembourg border stretches 73 kilometers (45 miles) in length, to the northeast of France and to the south of Luxembourg.

== Description ==
It begins in the west at the Belgium-France-Luxembourg tripoint (49°32′47″N 5°49′07″E), at the junction of the Belgian municipality of Aubange, the French commune of Mont-Saint-Martin and the Luxembourgish commune of Pétange. This point is located on the Chiers.

It then follows a general easterly direction to the Germany-France-Luxembourg tripoint (49°28′10″N 6°22′02″E), at the junction of the German municipality of Perl, the French commune of Apach and the Luxembourgish commune of Schengen. This point is located on the Moselle.

== History ==
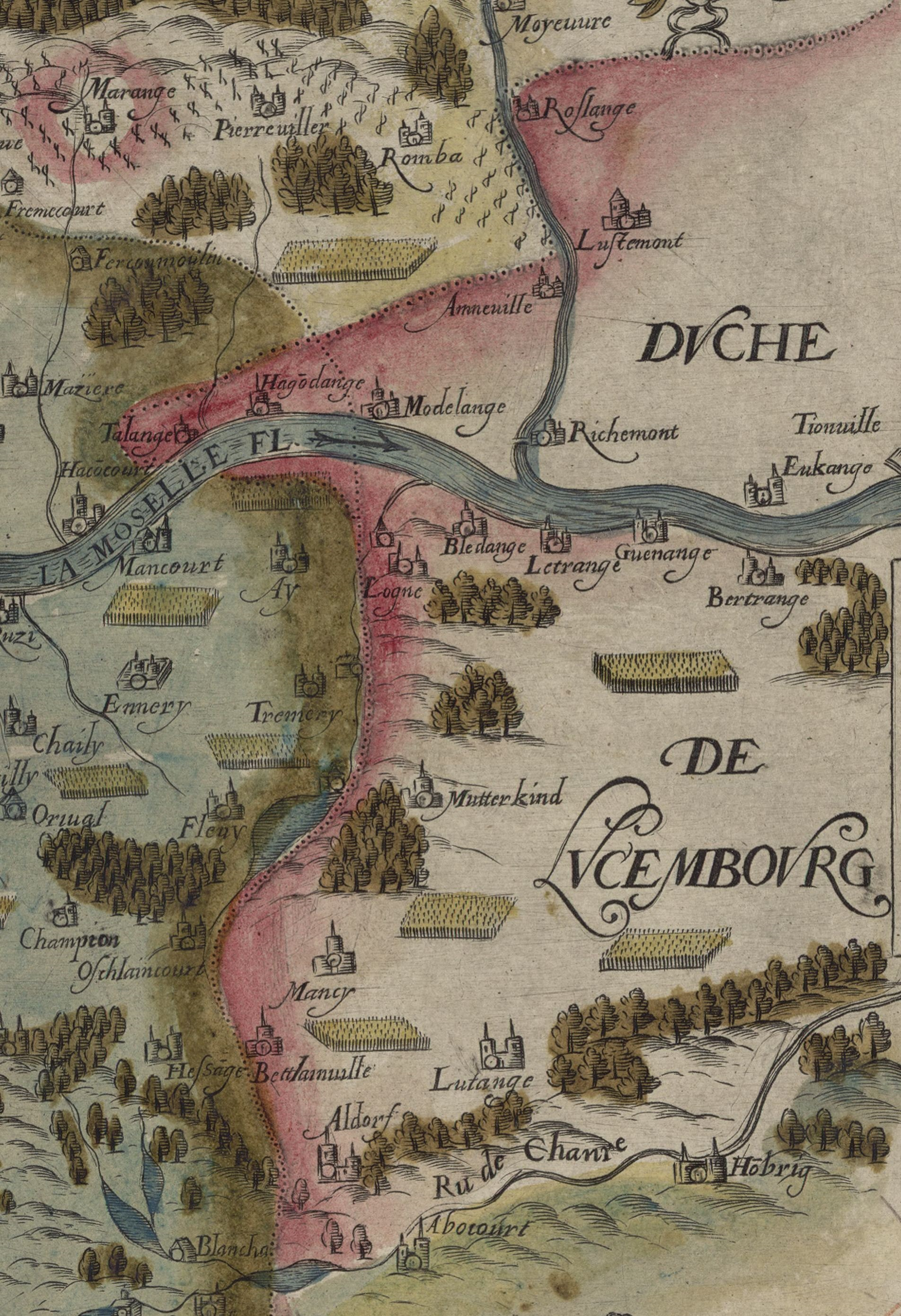
Border between the Messin country and Luxembourg in 1610, including the Luxembourgish enclave of Marange.

When the province of Trois-Évêchés was created in 1552, a first Franco-Luxembourgish border came into existence: it was located between the north of the arrondissement of Metz and the south of that of Thionville.

Under a treaty concluded at Marville in 1602, the Dukes of Luxembourg and Bar exchanged numerous villages along the border. Among these were Rédange, which was ceded to Bar, and Signeulx, Saint-Remy, Grandcourt, and Ruette-la-Petite, which were ceded to Luxembourg.

After the Treaty of the Pyrenees in 1659, despite the changes that occurred in the dynasties of its sovereigns, the territorial surface of Luxembourg experienced no variation until 1795, except for those agreed by Marie-Thérèse and the King of France Louis XV, recounted in the two boundary treaties of 1769 and 1779.

=== Convention of 16 May 1769 ===
The convention of 16 May 1769 put an end to the existence of several enclaves in France and Austrian Netherlands (of which Luxembourg was a part at the time), this convention also formed a new boundary line: "The Ruisseau of Frisange (Gander) will serve as Limits in this part, from the place where it leaves the Territory of Frisange, as far as that where it enters the Territory of Ganderen, and from this point, pulling as far as the Moselle, the Limit will remain as it is now, so that Ganderen, Beyern and all that currently belongs below the said Limit to the Empress Queen, will henceforth belong to France”.

The King ceded to the Empress-Queen, via Article XVIII, his rights, claims and possessions over the villages and places located to the left of the Frisange stream. Her Majesty the Empress Queen for her part renounced, via article XIX, all claims to the seigniories that France has so far claimed to possess as dependencies of Thionville, insofar as they are located to the right of the said Frisange stream and the limit marked by article XVIII.

=== Convention of 18 November 1779 ===
The King of France ceded to the Empress-Queen, on the border of Luxembourg, the village, land and seigneury of Sommethonne, as well as the property of Haillon with their belongings, dependencies and annexes (article XXIX). The Empress-Queen ceded to the King, in the same province, the villages of Gernelle and Rumelle, together with their belongings, dependencies and annexes (article XXX).

=== 19th century ===
The communes of Évrange and Hagen were united by decree of 12 April 1811 in Frisange (at the time in the Department of Forests); then reintegrated into the Moselle, under the treaty of 1814.

Before the Revolution, the village of Manderen, landlocked in Lorraine, belonged to the Austrian Netherlands as a dependent of Luxembourg. Following the conquests of France, this village was classified in the department of Forests (canton of Remich). Occupied by Prussia in 1815, the village was finally ceded by it to France in 1829.

From 1871 to 1918, following the German annexation, the Franco-Luxembourg border was reduced to a line that ran from Mont-Saint-Martin to Hussigny-Godbrange.

The last modification of the border in 2007

=== 21st century ===
The last modification of the course of the border dates from 2007 with the exchange of land with a total area of 87,679 square metres (943,770 sq ft) between the French municipality of Russange and that of Luxembourg Sanem, west of Esch-sur-Alzette, as part of a brownfields project to reconvert steel wastelands into tertiary and university hubs.

== List of municipalities bordering this border ==
From west to east:

=== French communes ===
- Mont-Saint-Martin
- Longlaville
- Saulnes
- Hussigny-Godbrange
- Redange
- Russange
- Audun-le-Tiche
- Ottange
- Volmerange-les-Mines
- Zoufftgen
- Hagen
- Évrange
- Basse-Rentgen
- Mondorff
- Puttelange-lès-Thionville
- Beyren-lès-Sierck
- Haute-Kontz
- Contz-les-Bains
- Sierck-les-Bains
- Apach

=== Luxembourgish communes ===
- Pétange
- Differdange
- Sanem
- Esch-sur-Alzette
- Rumelange
- Kayl
- Dudelange
- Bettembourg
- Roeser
- Frisange
- Mondorf-les-Bains
- Schengen

== Passages ==
=== Railway crossing points ===
There are currently four open rail crossings:

Station (France)	Station (Luxembourg)	Line number (SNCF)	Line number (CFL)	to (France)	to (Luxembourg)
Mont-Saint-Martin	Rodange	202100	6h	Longwy	Esch-sur-Alzette
Audun-le-Tiche	Esch-sur-Alzette	196300	6e	-all lines closed-	Esch-sur-Alzette
Zoufftgen	Bettembourg	180000	6	Metz	Luxembourg
Volmerange-les-Mines	Dudelange	-	6b	-no line-	Luxembourg
Notes: The French commune of Audun-le-Tiche is now only accessible by rail from Luxembourg, the three lines to Hussigny-Godbrange, Fontoy and Villerupt having been closed.; Following a cross-border regional agreement to add 850m of track to line 6b (Bettembourg - Dudelange), the French town of Volmerange-les-Mines became the new terminus in 2003.

=== Road crossing points ===
There are many road crossing points crossing the border, the major one being European route E25 from Strasbourg via Saint-Avold and Metz ( A 31) to Luxembourg city ( A 3), crossing the border at Zoufftgen.

== See also ==
- The Zoufftgen train collision which occurred on 11 October 2006, exactly at the Franco-Luxembourg border
- List of countries and territories by land borders
