= Dudelange-Centre railway station =

Railway station in Luxembourg

Dudelange-Centre
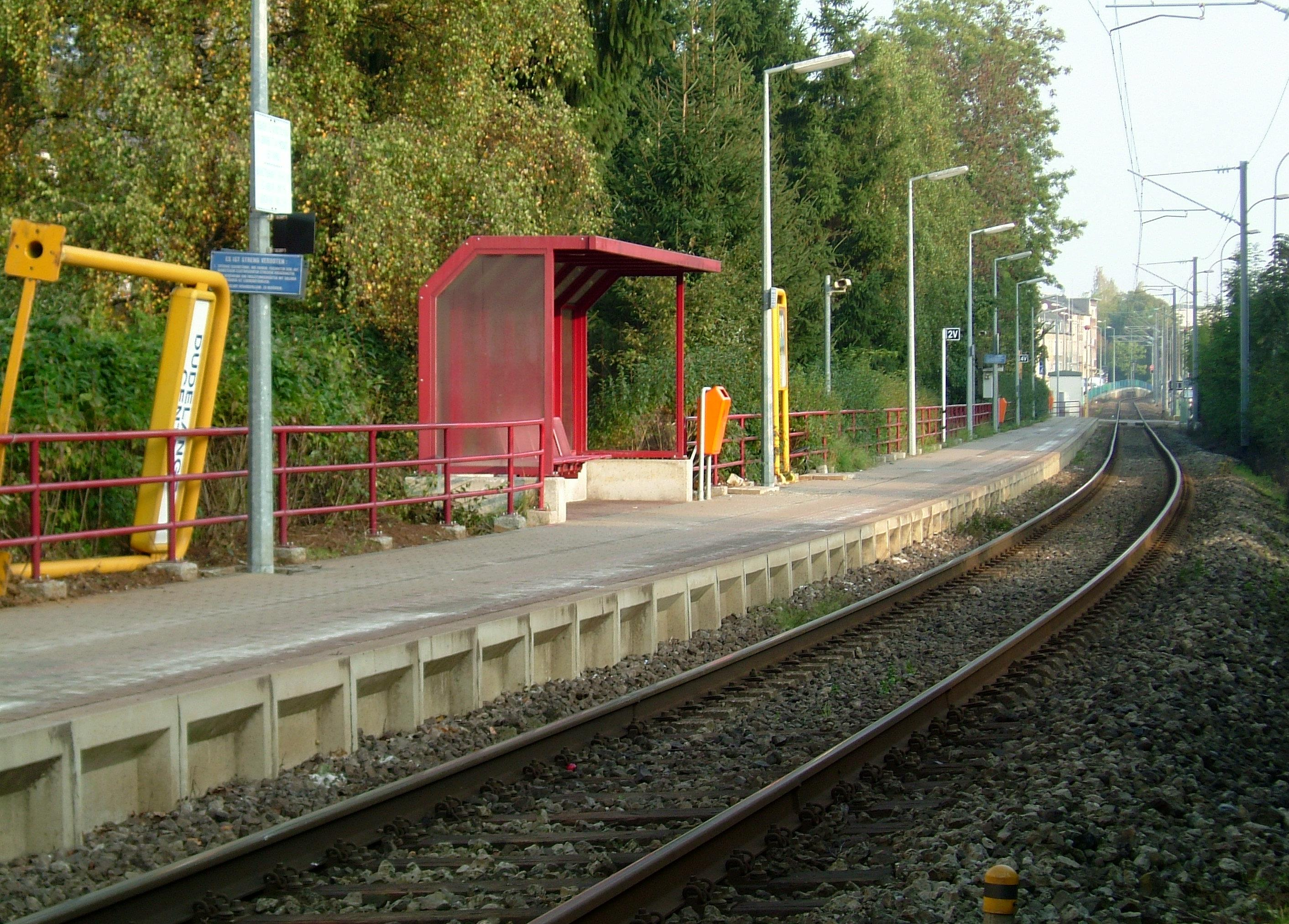
- Dudelange-Centre station

General information
- Location: Rue de l'Étang L-3481; Dudelange; Luxembourg
- Coordinates: 49°28′43″N 06°04′56″E
- Operator: CFL
- Line: CFL Line 60
- Platforms: 1
- Tracks: 1
- Train operators: CFL

Construction
- Parking: 130
- Cycle facilities: 6

History
- Opened: 1999
Location

Dudelange-Centre railway station (Luxembourgish: Gare Diddeleng-Zenter, French: Gare de Dudelange-Centre, German: Bahnhof Düdelingen-Zentrum) is a railway station serving central Dudelange, in southern Luxembourg. It is operated by Chemins de Fer Luxembourgeois, the state-owned railway company.

The station is situated on Line 60, which connects Luxembourg City to the Red Lands of the south of the country. It is the third station on the branch to the French town of Volmerange-les-Mines. Dudelange-Centre is one of four railway stations in the city.

Preceding station	CFL	Following station
Dudelange-Ville towards Bettembourg	Line 60A	Dudelange-Usines towards Volmerange-les-Mines
