= Dudelange-Usines railway station =

Railway station in Luxembourg

Dudelange-Usines
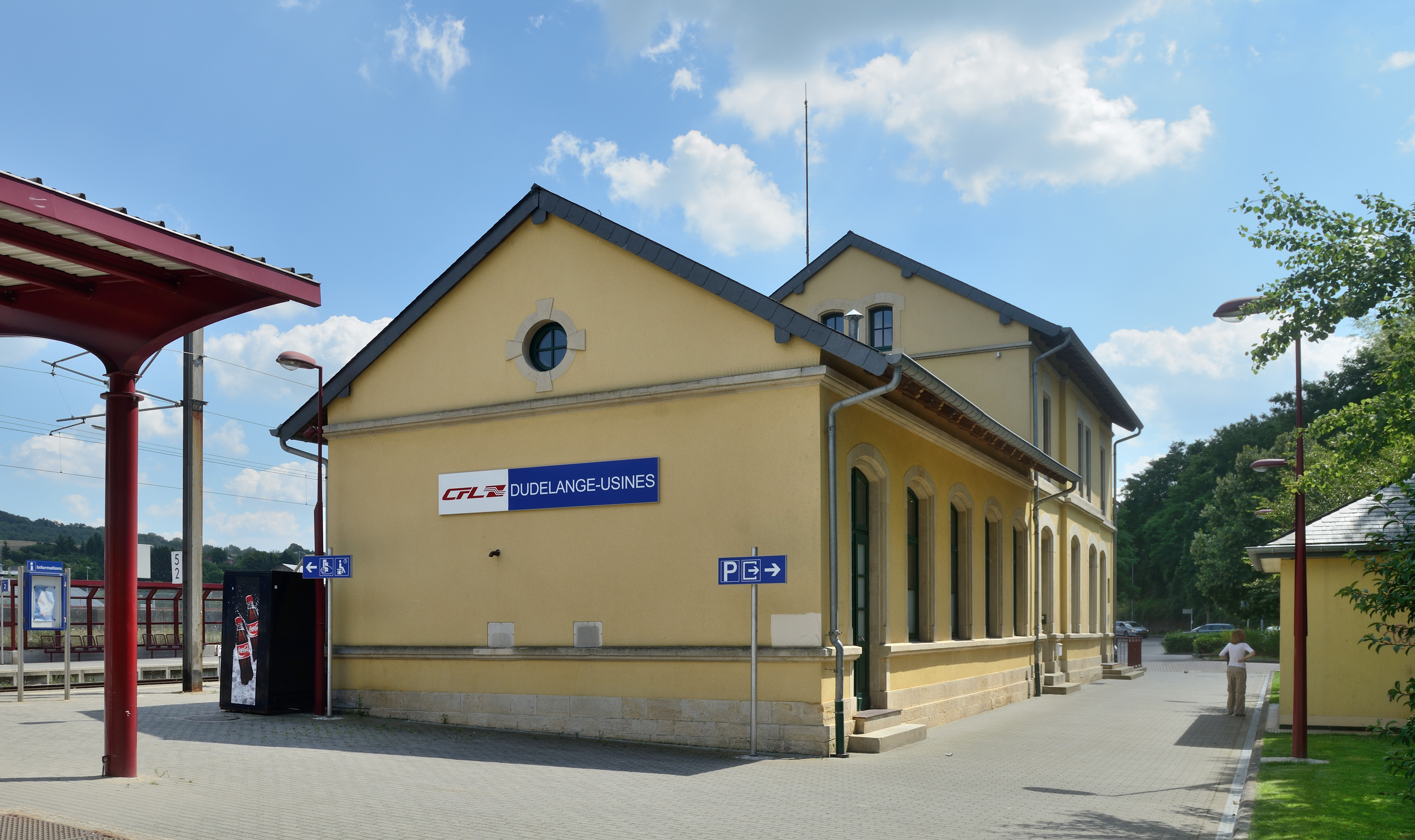
- Station in 2014.

General information
- Location: Dudelange; Luxembourg
- Coordinates: 49°28′21″N 06°4′45″E
- Line(s): Line 60A
Location

Dudelange-Usines railway station (Luxembourgish: Gare Diddeleng-Schmelz, French: Gare de Dudelange-Usines, German: Bahnhof Düdelingen-Werk) is a railway station serving the south of Dudelange, in southern Luxembourg. It is operated by Chemins de Fer Luxembourgeois, the state-owned railway company.

The station is situated on Line 60, which connects Luxembourg City to the Red Lands of the south of the country. It is the fourth station on the branch to the French town of Volmerange-les-Mines. Dudelange-Centre is one of four railway stations in the city.

Preceding station	CFL	Following station
Dudelange-Centre towards Bettembourg	Line 60A	Volmerange-les-Mines Terminus
