= Dudelange-Burange railway station =

Railway station in Luxembourg

Coordinates: 49°29′34″N 06°05′10″E

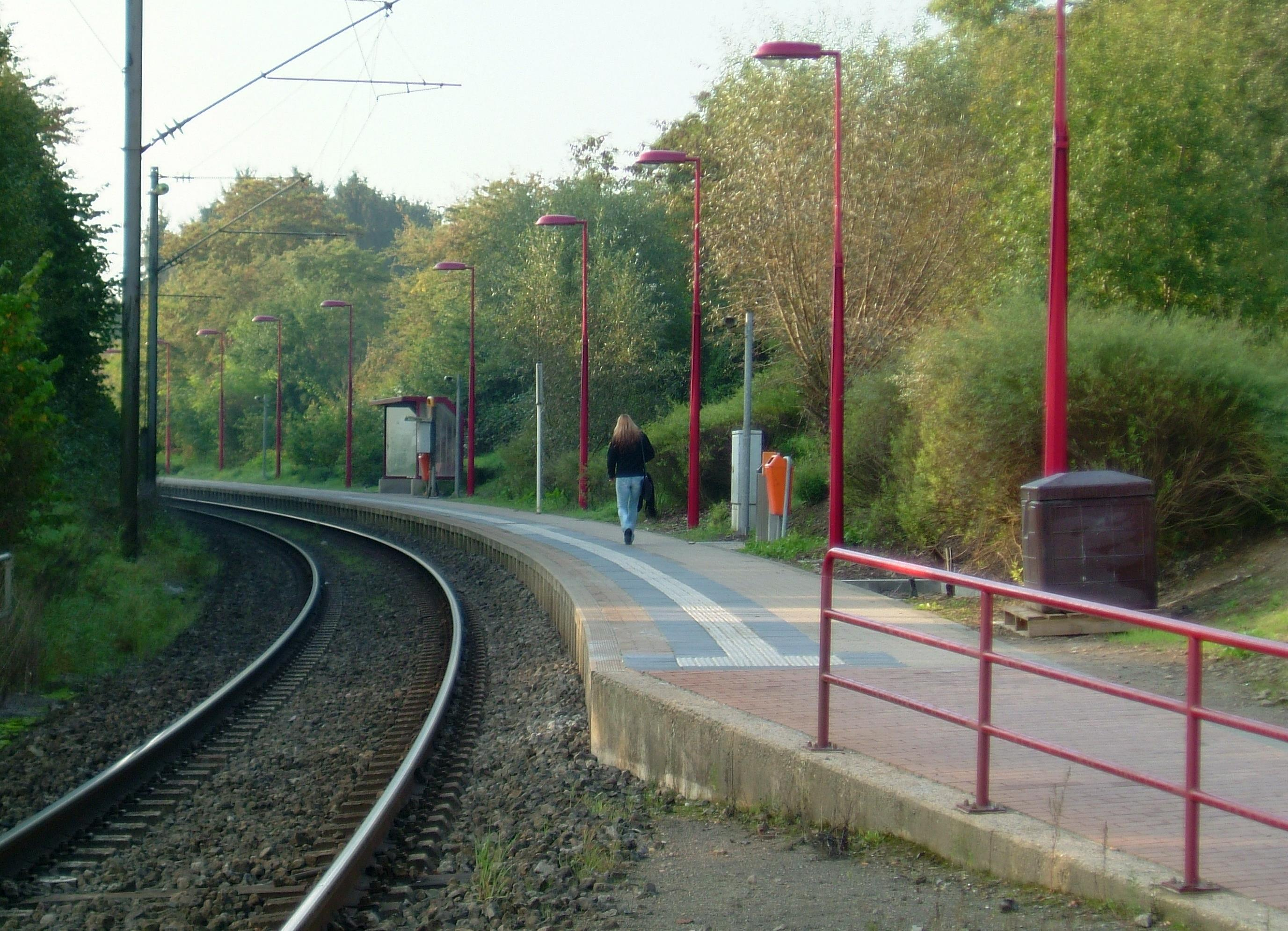
The station railway in 2006

Dudelange-Burange railway station (Luxembourgish: Gare Diddeleng-Bireng, French: Gare de Dudelange-Burange, German: Bahnhof Düdelingen-Büringen) is a railway station serving the neighbourhood of Burange, in the north of Dudelange, in southern Luxembourg. It is operated by Chemins de Fer Luxembourgeois, the state-owned railway company.

The station is situated on Line 60, which connects Luxembourg City to the Red Lands of the south of the country. It is the first station on the branch to the French town of Volmerange-les-Mines. Dudelange-Burange is one of four railway stations in the city.

Preceding station	CFL	Following station
Bettembourg Terminus	Line 60A	Dudelange-Ville towards Volmerange-les-Mines
