= Dudelange-Ville railway station =

Railway station in Luxembourg

Coordinates: 49°28′59″N 06°04′59″E

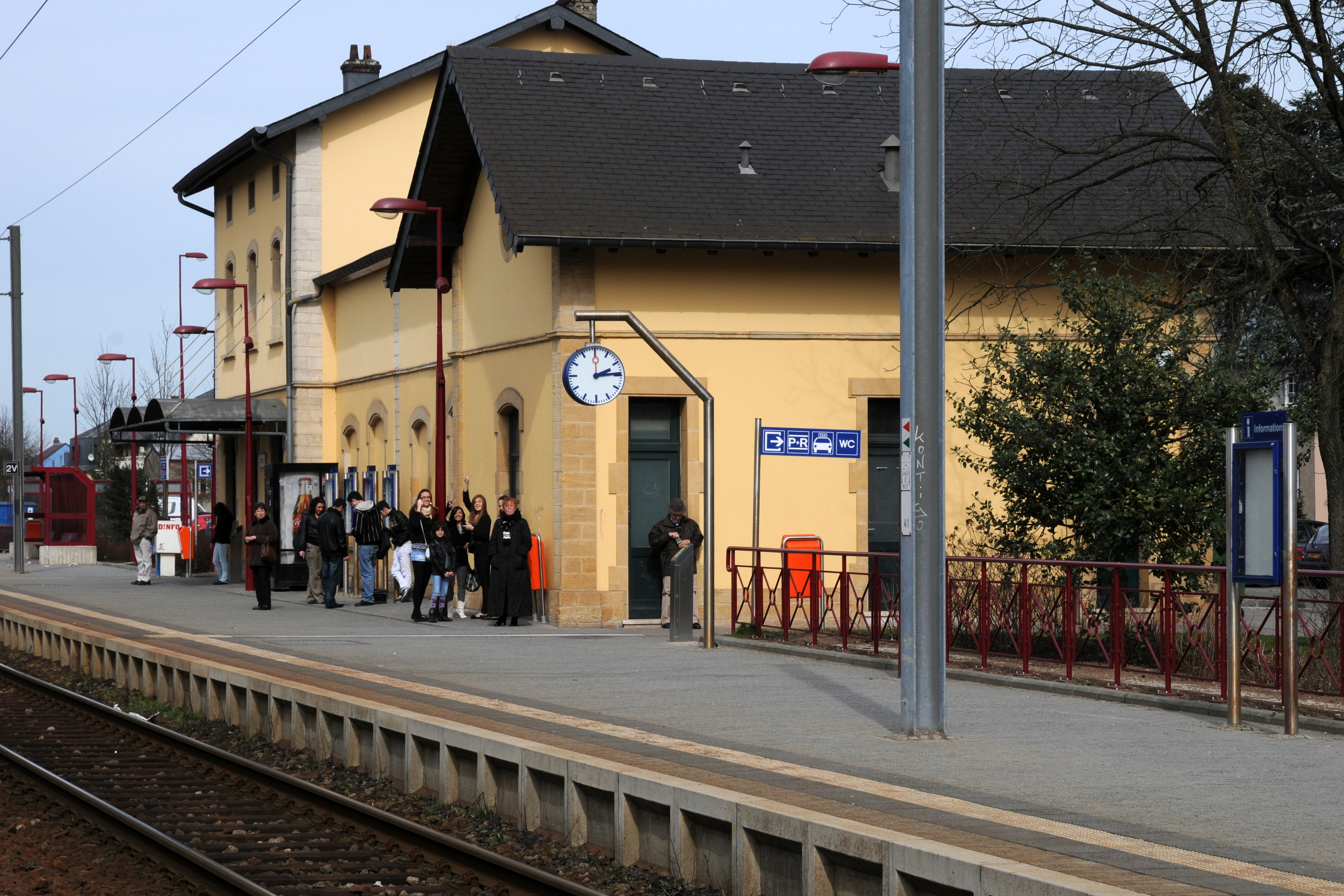
Train station Dudelange.

Dudelange-Ville railway station (Luxembourgish: Gare Diddeleng-Stad, French: Gare de Dudelange-Ville, German: Bahnhof Düdelingen-Stadt) is a railway station serving central Dudelange, in southern Luxembourg. It is operated by Chemins de Fer Luxembourgeois, the state-owned railway company.

The station is situated on Line 60, which connects Luxembourg City to the Red Lands of the south of the country. It is the second station on the branch to the French town of Volmerange-les-Mines. Dudelange-Ville is one of four railway stations in the city.

Preceding station	CFL	Following station
Dudelange-Burange towards Bettembourg	Line 60A	Dudelange-Centre towards Volmerange-les-Mines
