= Rotondes (Luxembourg) =

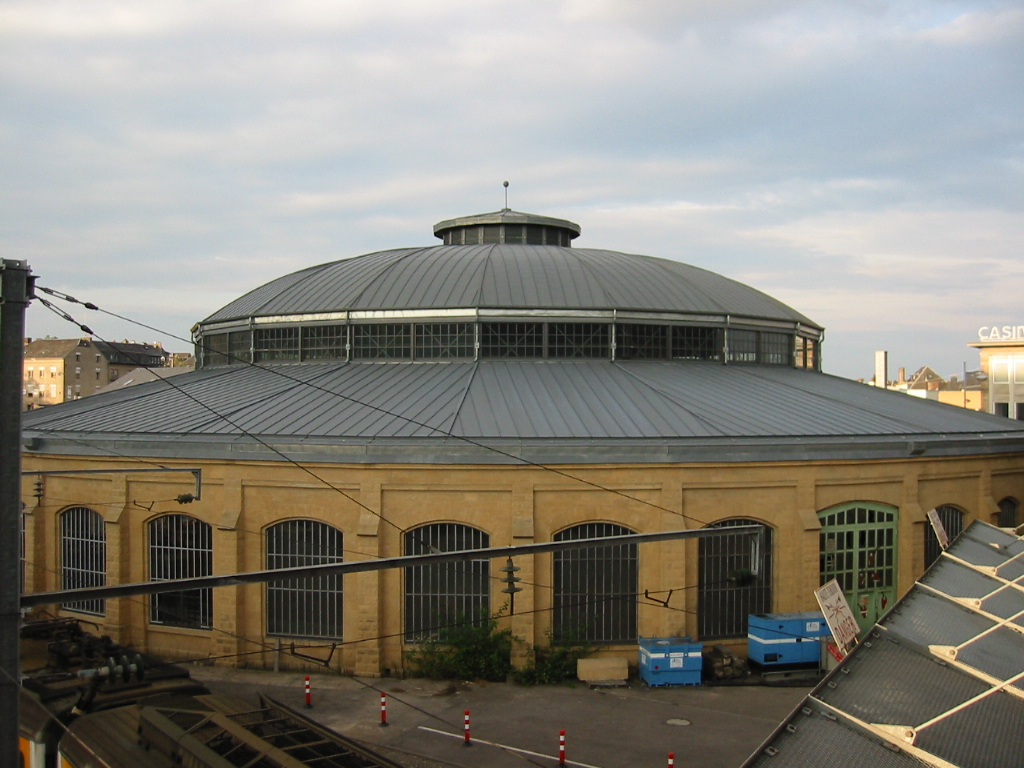
The Southern Rotonde

The Rotondes (Luxembourgish: Rotonden, French: Rotondes) are two railway roundhouses with a diameter of 52 meters and a height of 15 meters, built by the Chemins de Fer Luxembourgeois (CFL), located in Bonnevoie, Luxembourg City.

== History ==
The Rotondes were built in the year 1877, for the servicing of steam locomotives. Each Rotonde could stable 18 locomotives. A new engine shed in Howald was completed in the year 1907, and the Rotondes were therefore no longer needed for their original purpose. The Rotondes were classified as national monuments in 1991.

The Southern Rotonde was used as a warehouse by the CFL until 1999, whereas the Northern Rotonde was used as a bus garage until 2006. The Rotondes were transferred from the ownership of the CFL to the government of the Grand Duchy of Luxembourg in the year 2000, and the ministry of culture is responsible for their upkeep and development In the year 2007, the two buildings were used for cultural activities as Luxembourg was selected as a European capital of culture, the southern building hosted a restaurant.

The buildings remained unoccupied between 2008 and 2010, when the buildings administration of Luxembourg city was given a budget of 16 Million Euros and tasked with renovating the buildings to be used to host cultural activities. The renovation began in 2013.

The reopening of the Rotondes, following their renovation, was celebrated on the 13 July 2015.

== Current Use ==
Since 2015, the two railway roundhouses are used as a multidisciplinary cultural centre hosting events that range from performing to visual arts, concerts as well as numerous conferences and workshops for all ages.

- The Southern Rotonde (Rotonde 1) contains a performance venue (Grande Salle), an open space designed to be used as an exhibition space or indoor market (Galerie), and a multi-purpose hall (Plateforme) to host conferences, screenings, talks, etc.
- The Northern Rotonde (Rotonde 2) has only been partially renovated, and consists of a bar (Buvette) and concert hall (Klub) within a wooden structure.
- Between the two Rotondes stands the so-called "Container City" which contains a performance venue (Black Box), the Radio Ara studios, and multi-purpose studios hosting creative workshops, rehearsals, meetings, etc.
