= Berchem railway station =

Railway station in Luxembourg

Berchem
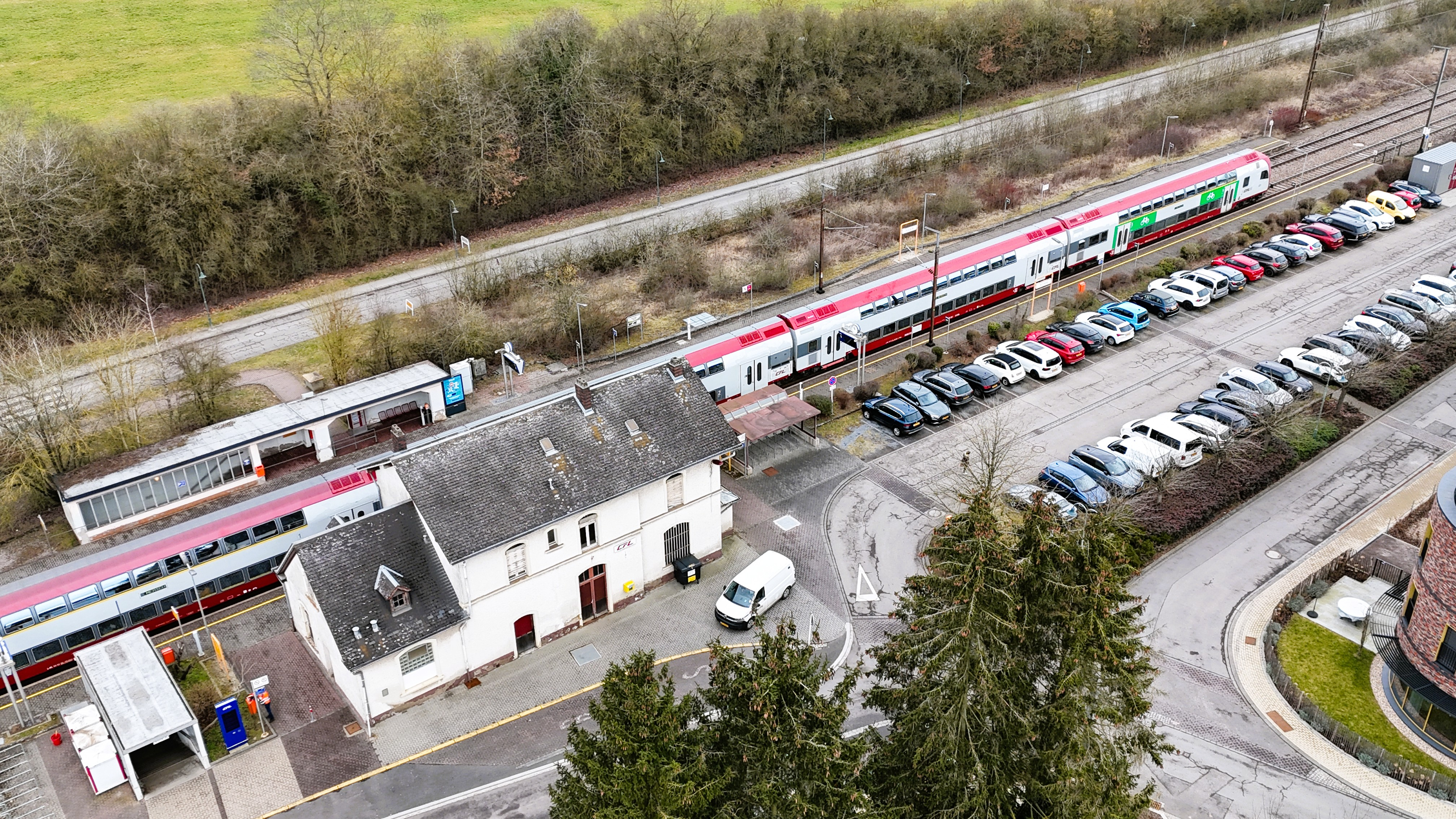
- View of the station shortly before the old station building's demolition (2025)

General information
- Location: Berchem, Roeser; Luxembourg
- Coordinates: 49°32′28″N 6°7′47″E
- Operator: Chemins de Fer Luxembourgeois
- Line: 60

Services
Preceding station	CFL	Following station
Howald towards Luxembourg	Line 60	Bettembourg towards Rodange
Location

Berchem railway station (Luxembourgish: Gare Bierchem, French: Gare de Berchem, German: Bahnhof Berchem) is a railway station serving Berchem, in the commune of Roeser, in southern Luxembourg. It is operated by Chemins de Fer Luxembourgeois (CFL), the state-owned railway company.

The station is situated on Line 60, which connects Luxembourg City to the Red Lands of the south of the country.

As part of a larger modernization project, CFL plans to demolish the building at the station. The project includes updating the station to improve accessibility and meet current standards. Plans include an underground passageway usable for pedestrians and bikes that will connect the station platforms, widening the platforms, and adding elevator access.
