= CA Dudelange =

Amateur athletics club in Luxembourg

Logo

Cercle Athletique Dudelange, abbreviated to CAD, is an amateur athletics club in Dudelange, in southern Luxembourg. Founded in 1932, the club is based at Stade J.F. Kennedy, in the Burange district of northern Dudelange. Former Dudelange athletes include Roland Bombardella and René Kilburg.

== Team Records ==
- Correct as of August 2017 Season

=== Men ===
Event	Result	Athlete	Year	Nationality	C
100 m	0:10.1	Roland Bombardella	1978	LUX	
200 m	0:20.5	Lambert Micha	1978	BEL	
400 m	0:48.2	Roland Bombardella	1978	LUX	
800 m	1:51.4	Léon Kemp	1987		
1000 m	2:26.4	Jean-Paul Hurt	1983	LUX	
1500 m	3:45.8	René Kilburg	1967	LUX	
3000 m	8:04.4	René Kilburg	1967	LUX	
5000 m	14:08.6	René Kilburg	1967	LUX	
10,000 m	31:49.0	René Kilburg	1967	LUX	
20,000 m	1:08:49.0	Jean-Marie Dürrer	1989		
25,000 m	1:27:00.0	Jean-Marie Dürrer	1989		
half marathon	1:10:31.0	Henri Nilles	1987		
marathon	2:33:04.0	Alfred Liesch	1986		
110 m hurdles	0:14.03	Sven Gales	2000		
400 m hurdles	0:53.2	Sven Gales	2000		
3000 m steeple	9:37.0	Paul Schaack	1965		
high jump	2.15 m	Marc Romersa	1976	LUX	
long jump	7.54 m	Michael Velter	2002	BEL	
triple jump	15.83 m	Michael Velter	2001	BEL	
pole vault	5.31 m	Sébastien Hoffelt	2012	LUX	
discus throw	44.93 m	Valentin Moll	2017	GER	
hammer throw	70.1 m	Jean Charles de Ridder	2000	LUX	
heavy hammer throw	15.56 m	Steve Tonizzo	2014	LUX	
shot put	17.2 m	Valentin Moll	2017	GER	
javelin throw	73.32 m	Antoine Collette	2003	LUX	

=== Women ===
Event	Result	Athlete	Year	Nationality
100 m	0:12.21	Sandra Felten	1993	
200 m	0:24.7	Sandra Felten	1997	
400 m	0:55.8	Sandra Felten	1997	
600 m	1:39.4	Jeanne-Marie Reuter	1973	
800 m	2:16.1	Martine Wagner	1982	
1000 m	2:57.83	Fanny Goy	2017	LUX
1500 m	4:43.5	Fanny Goy	2017	LUX
3000 m	10:08.21	Anne Logelin	2007	LUX
5000 m	17:58.35	Linda Kunsch	1998	
10,000 m	38:44.74	Liz Weiler	2016	LUX
half marathon	1:21:24.0	Anne Logelin	2007	LUX
110 m hurdles	0:14.00	Lara Marx	2017	LUX
400 m hurdles	1:00.72	Martine Bomb	2007	LUX
3000 m steeple	11:08.86	Liz Weiler	2017	LUX
high jump	1.78 m	Liz Kuffer	2009	LUX
long jump	5.82 m	Lara Marx	2015	LUX
triple jump	11.49 m	Lara Marx	2015	LUX
pole vault	3.75 m	Elke Andries Lara Buekens	2001 2015	BEL LUX
discus throw (1 kg)	44.78 m	Noémie Pleimling	2018*	LUX
hammer throw	49.24 m	Géraldine Davin	2016	LUX
heavy hammer throw	15.21 m	Mireille Tonizzo-Kosmala	2014	LUX
shot put	13.45 m	Sandra Felten	1996	
javelin throw	50.74 m	Noémie Pleimling	2018*	LUX

*exception: updated as of August, 2018
