= CFL Line 60 =

Railway line in Luxembourg

Overview
- Status: Operational
- Locale: Luxembourg
- Termini: Luxembourg

Service
- Services: 1
- Operator: CFL

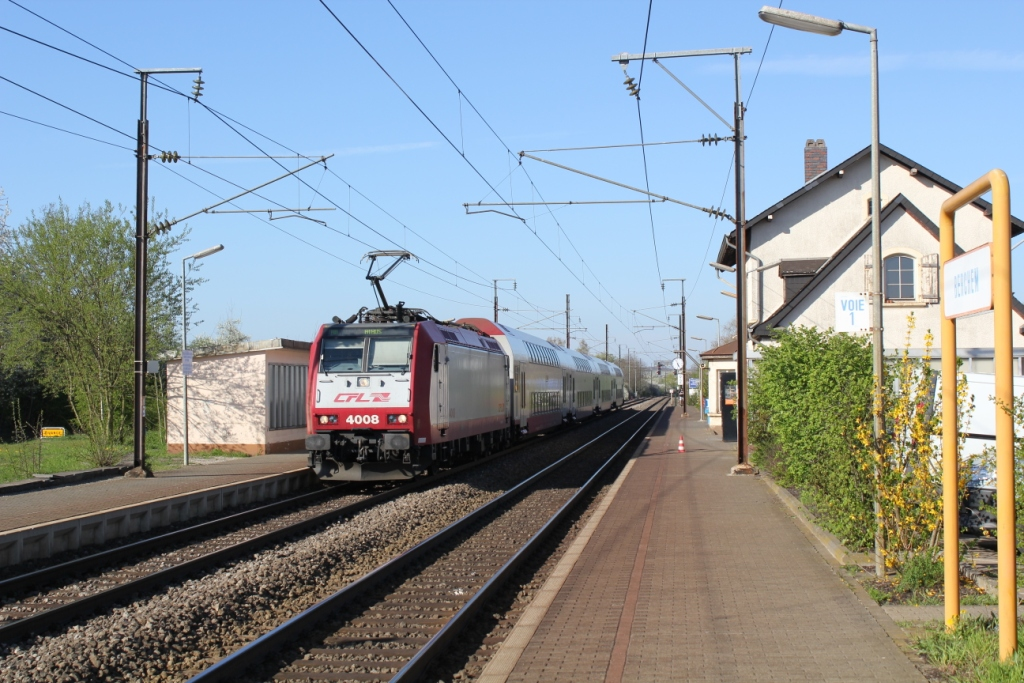
CFL 4008 train at Berchem station.

Line 60 is a railway line connecting Luxembourg City to the Red Lands of the south of Luxembourg, and on to France. The terminus at the northern end is Luxembourg railway station, whilst the terminals at the south are Rumelange, Pétange, and the French towns of Volmerange-les-Mines and Audun-le-Tiche. It is designated, and predominantly operated, by Chemins de Fer Luxembourgeois.

== Stations ==
- Luxembourg
- Howald
- Berchem
- Bettembourg
  - Dudelange-Burange
  - Dudelange-Ville
  - Dudelange-Centre
  - Dudelange-Usines
  - Volmerange-les-Mines (France)
- Noertzange
  - Kayl
  - Tétange
  - Rumelange
- Schifflange
- Esch-sur-Alzette
  - Audun-le-Tiche (France)
- Belval-Université
- Belval-Rédange
- Belvaux-Soleuvre
- Oberkorn
- Differdange
- Niederkorn
- Pétange
- Lamadelaine
- Rodange
