= Schifflange railway station =

Railway station in Luxembourg

Coordinates: 49°30′22″N 06°00′35″E

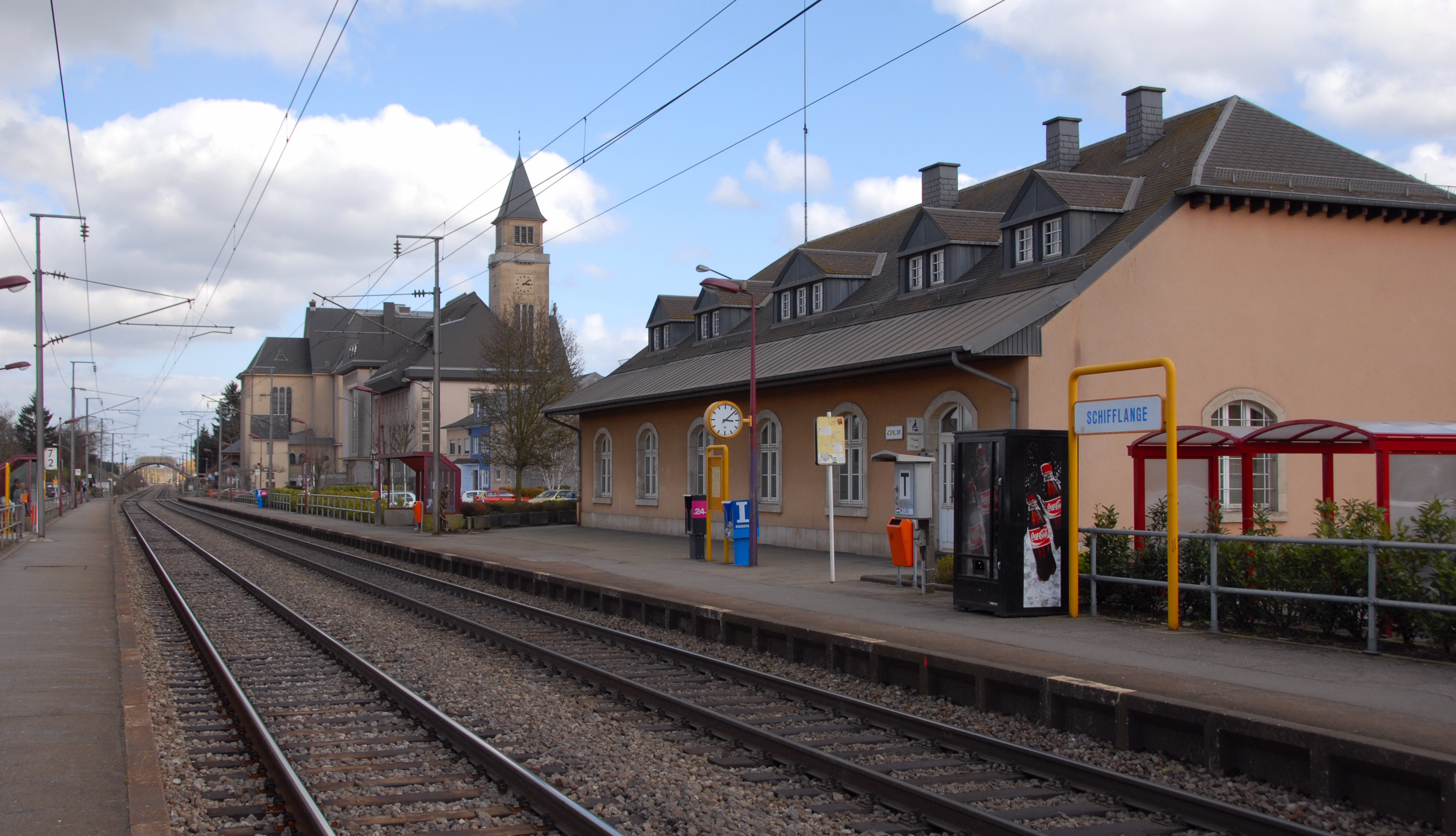
Schifflange train station in 2008

Schifflange railway station (Luxembourgish: Gare Schëffleng, French: Gare de Schifflange, German: Bahnhof Schifflingen) is a railway station serving Schifflange, in south-western Luxembourg. It is operated by Chemins de Fer Luxembourgeois, the state-owned railway company.

The station is situated on Line 60, which connects Luxembourg City to the Red Lands of the south of the country.

Preceding station	CFL	Following station
Noertzange towards Luxembourg	Line 60	Esch-sur-Alzette towards Rodange
