= Howald railway station =

Railway station in Luxembourg

Howald
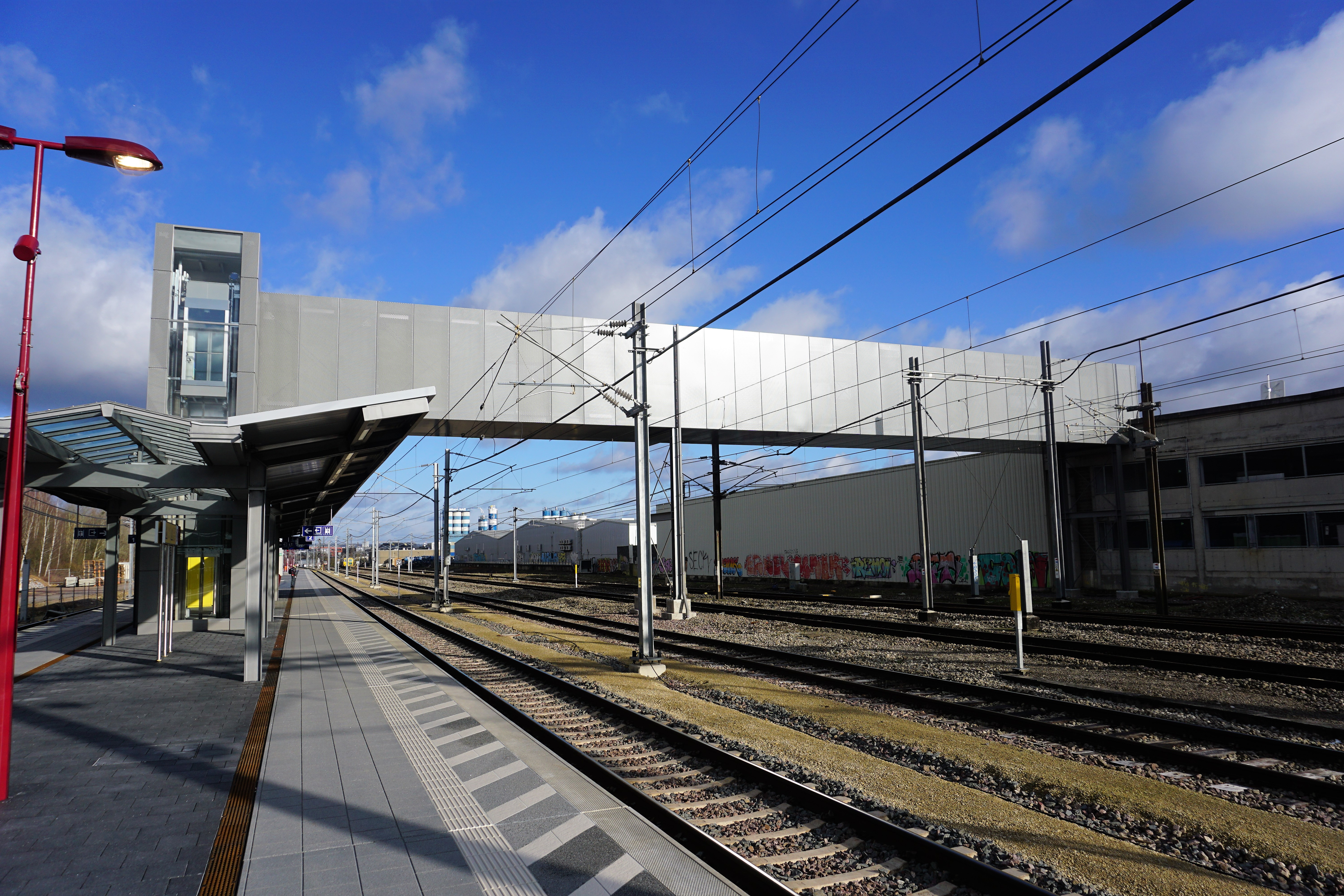
- The station in December 2017

General information
- Location: Howald, Hesperange; Luxembourg
- Coordinates: 49°34′50″N 6°07′55″E
- Owner: Luxembourg
- Operator: CFL
- Platforms: 1
- Train operators: CFL; SNCF

History
- Opened: 10 December 2017
Services
Preceding station	CFL	Following station
Luxembourg Terminus	Line 60	Berchem towards Rodange
Preceding station	TER Grand Est	Following station
Bettembourg towards Metz	L01b	Luxembourg Terminus
Location

Howald railway station (Luxembourgish: Gare Houwald, French: Gare de Howald, German: Bahnhof Howald) is a railway station in Luxembourg on line 6, which opened on December 10, 2017. It is located in Howald, in the commune of Hesperange, in the canton of Luxembourg. It is operated by Société nationale des chemins de fer luxembourgeois (CFL).

== Railway situation ==
At 289 meters above sea level, Howald station is located at kilometre point (PK) 14.400 of line 6, between Luxembourg and Berchem stations.

== History ==
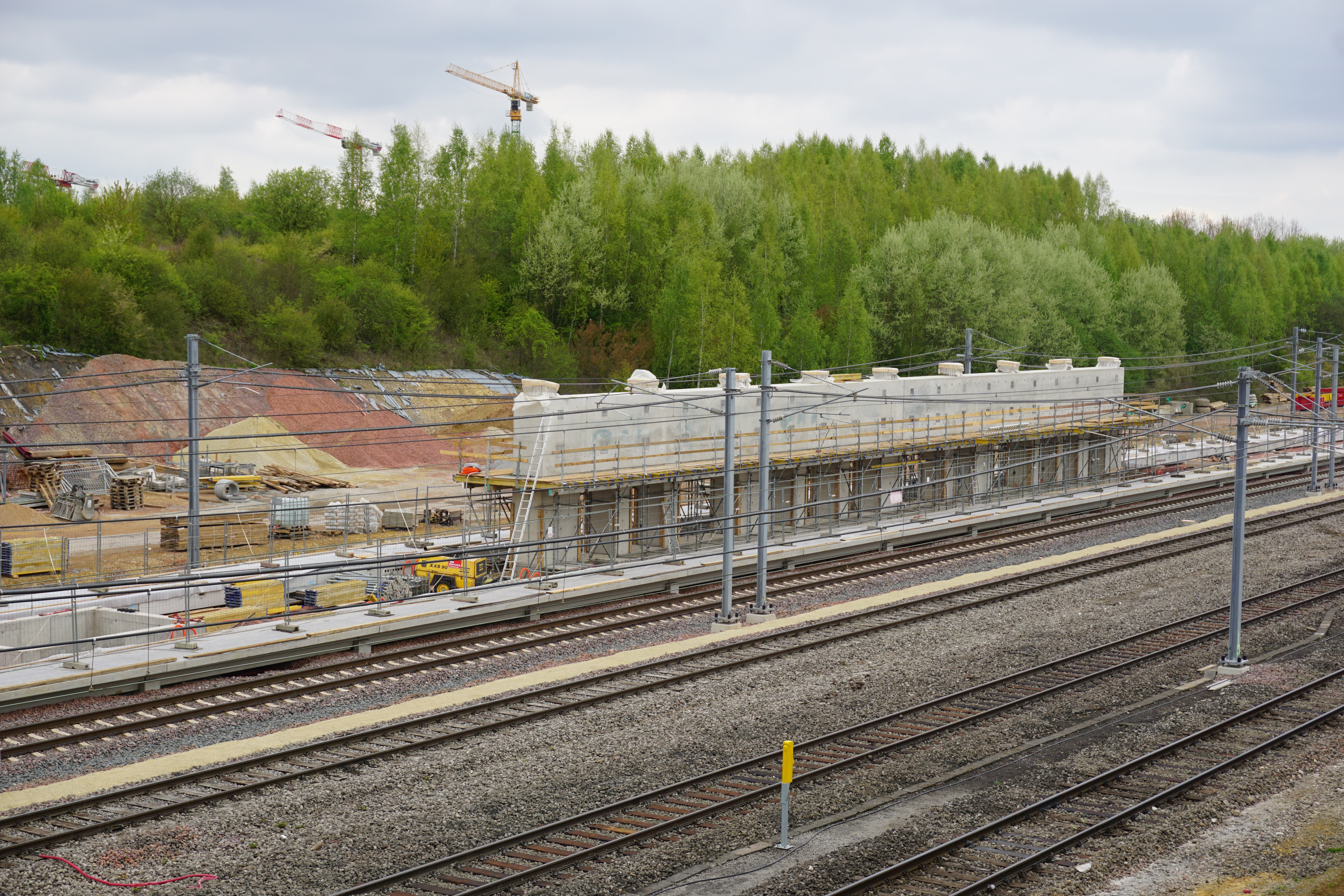
Pile at the future site of the tramway bridge (2017).

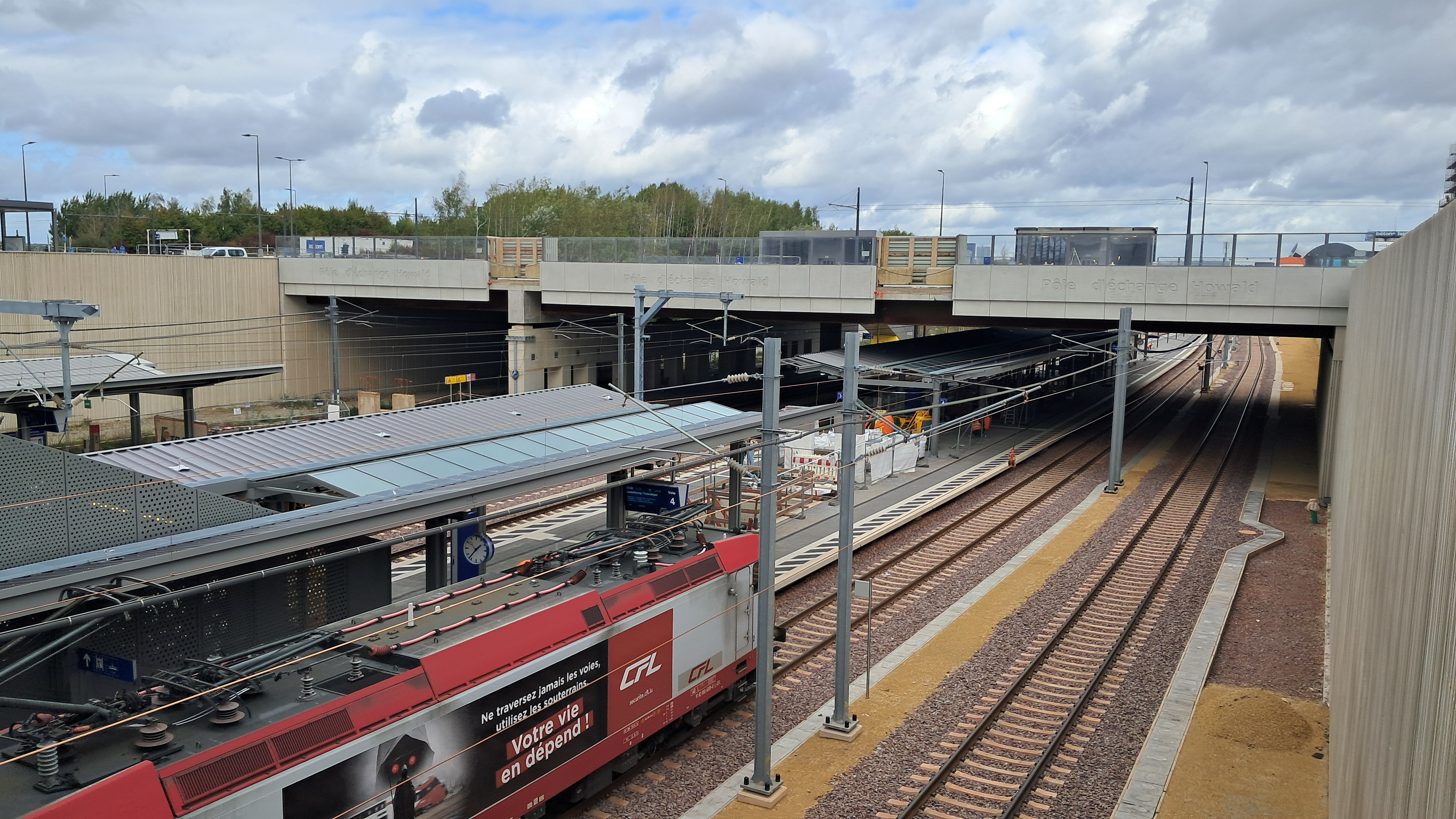
Same location, now with 2nd platform in operation, and tramwy bridge still not completely finished (2025).

The original Howald station opened on September 26, 1992, with a single platform and very limited facilities. The service was suspended for work between September 2000 and June 2002, before being definitively withdrawn on December 11, 2015.

Plans for a new station in Howald were first mentioned in 2009, and funding to build the station was granted on December 17, 2010. The station's opening was initially scheduled for 2015, but the financial crisis forced the government to postpone the project. The cost of construction was initially estimated to be around €43 million. The footbridge for the station was installed in November 2016.

The new station partially opened on December 10, 2017 (one platform and an access footbridge), while a provisional stop of the same name on line 4 was officially closed. The second platform was originally planned to be completed by 2020, at the same time as the arrival of the tramway to the south of the capital, with the opening of the second platform and the mixed tramway and bus bridge that will overlook it. However, the opening of the second platform, along with other projects on the line, was pushed back to 2026 due to problems with the acquisition of the right-of-way, revisions to the design of a railway structure due to a nearby motorway, and shortages in construction supplies due to the COVID-19 pandemic. Phase 1 ultimately cost €42.9 million, and provides direct access to the southern districts of Luxembourg City, home to a major business park, the Cloche-d'Or and the new Ban de Gasperich district. The new station saves a considerable amount of time for workers coming from the south of the country and the border regions, as they don't have to go all the way up to the central station and then take the municipal buses, and thus retrace their steps.

== Passenger service ==
=== Access ===
Access to the platform is via a footbridge, equipped with elevators and escalators, and eventually via the future bridge over which buses and trams will pass.

=== Service ===
Howald is served by TER, Regional-Express (RE) and Regionalbunn (RB) trains, which operate on the following routes:

- Line 60 : Luxembourg - Rodange;
- Line 90 (TER) : Luxembourg - Metz-Ville - Nancy-Ville;
- Line 10-60 : Troisvierges - Luxembourg - Rodange.

=== Intermodality ===
Howald station is served by buses, accessible via the footbridge, at the Howald Ronnebësch bus stop served by lines 24, 28 and 29 of the Luxembourg City buses and by lines 302, 455, 456, 501, 504, 621, 655, 801 and 802 of the Régime général des transports routiers.

The station is close to the Luxembourg-Sud park and ride facility and its 1,451 parking spaces. By 2024, Howald will be served by the Luxembourg tramway, for which it will be one of the major transfer points.
