= Esch-sur-Alzette railway station =

Railway station in Luxembourg

Esch-sur-Alzette
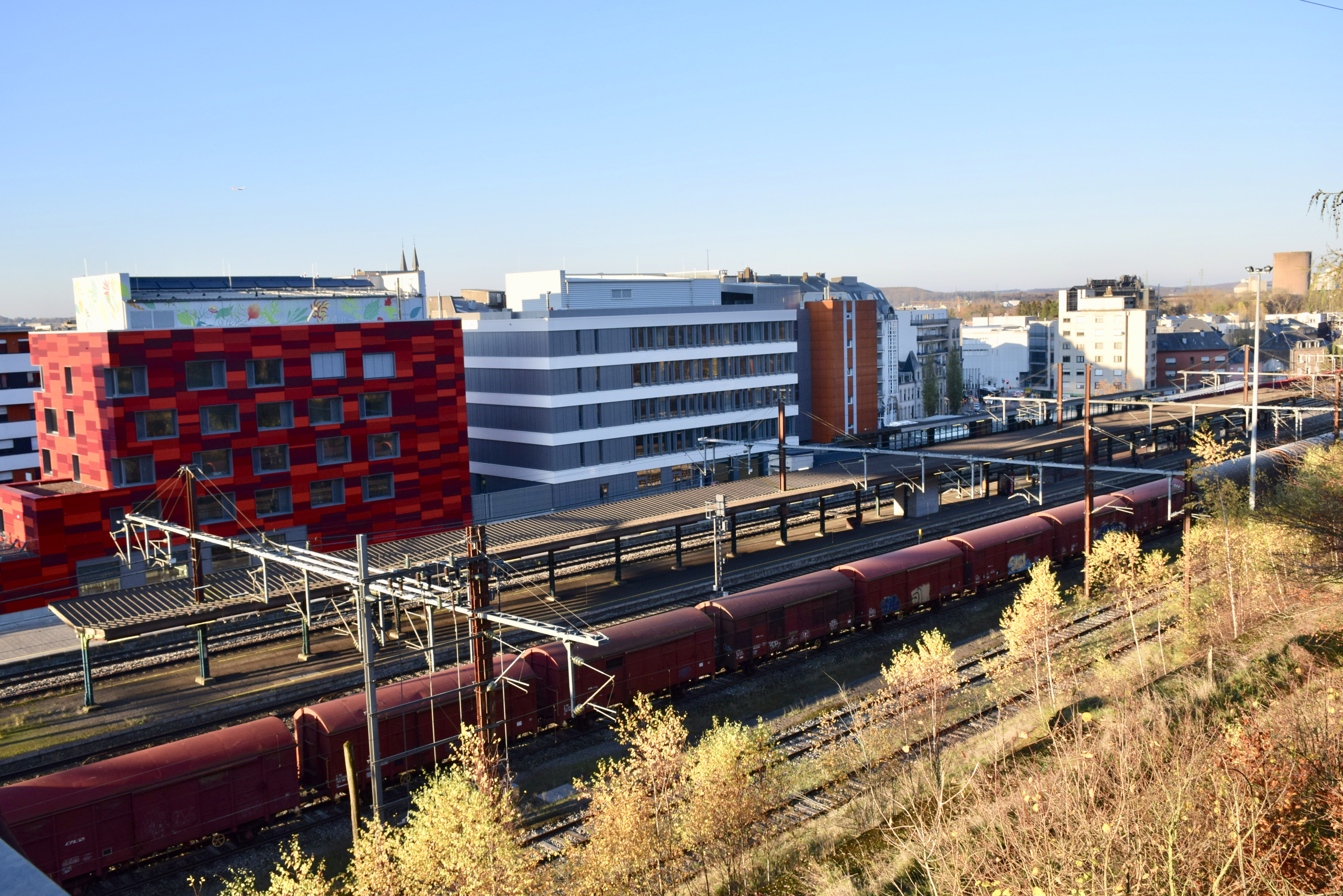
- The station's tracks, with the station building in grey and white

General information
- Location: Boulevard John Fitzgerald Kennedy, L-4170; Luxembourg
- Coordinates: 49°29′38″N 5°59′06″E
- Owner: Luxembourg
- Operator: CFL
- Platforms: 2

History
- Opened: 23 April 1860

Passengers
- 2022: 2,831,237
- Rank: 3

Services
| Preceding station | CFL | Following station |
|---|---|---|
| Schifflange towards Luxembourg | Line 60 | Belval-Université towards Rodange |
| Terminus | Line 60C | Audun-le-Tiche Terminus |
Location

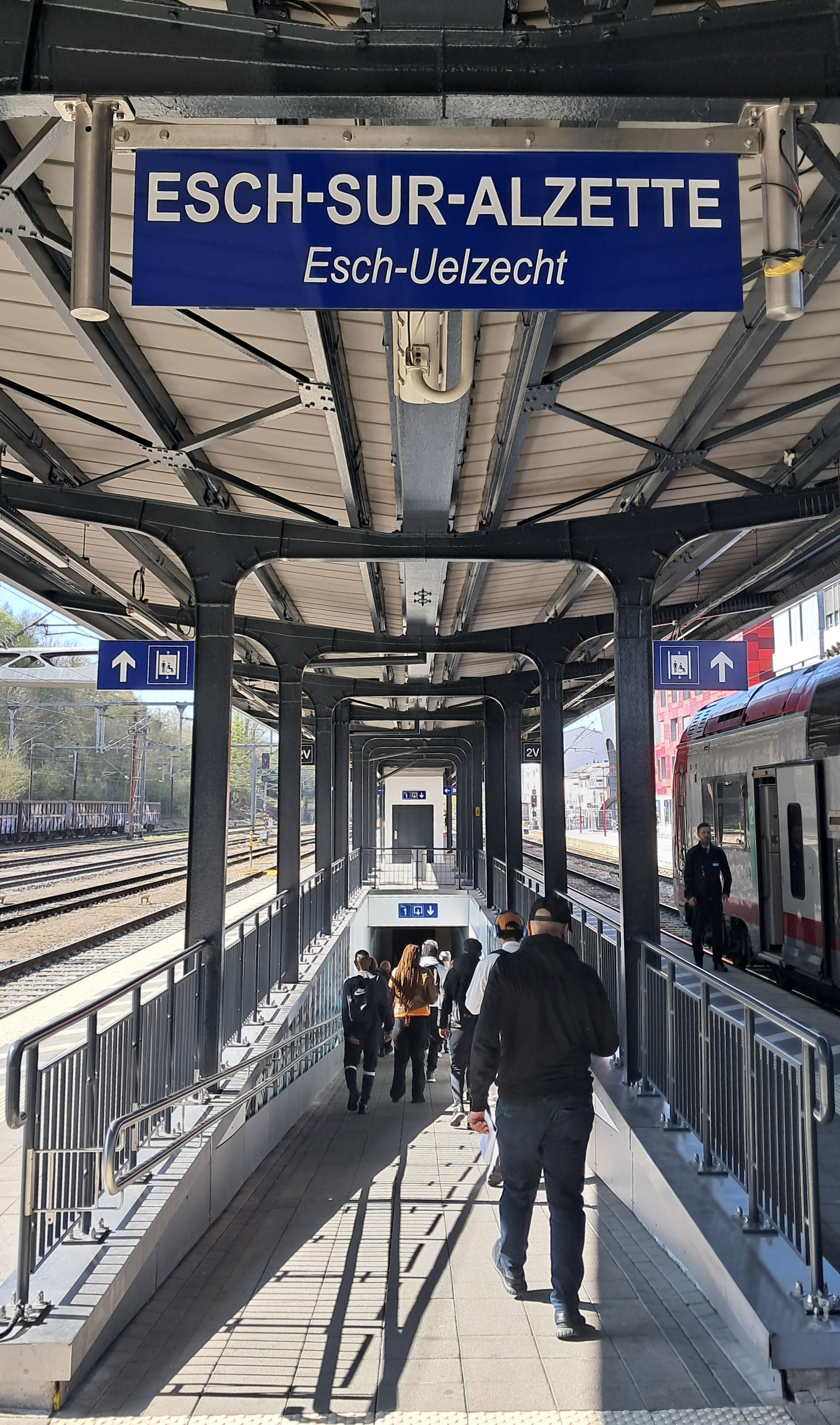
The central platform

Esch-sur-Alzette railway station (Luxembourgish: Gare Esch-Uelzecht, French: Gare de Esch-sur-Alzette, German: Bahnhof Esch-an-der-Alzette) is a railway station serving Esch-sur-Alzette, in south-western Luxembourg. It is operated by Chemins de Fer Luxembourgeois (CFL), the state-owned railway company. CFL general refer to the station as Esch/Alzette as shown on the sign.

The station is situated on Line 60, which connects Luxembourg City to the Red Lands of the south of the country. After Esch-sur-Alzette, the main line continues towards Niederkorn, whilst a minor line branches off to Audun-le-Tiche, in France.

As of 2022, it was the third-busiest station in Luxembourg, with over 2.8 million passengers that year.
