= Burange =

Neighbourhood in Luxembourg

Coordinates: 49°29′N 6°06′E

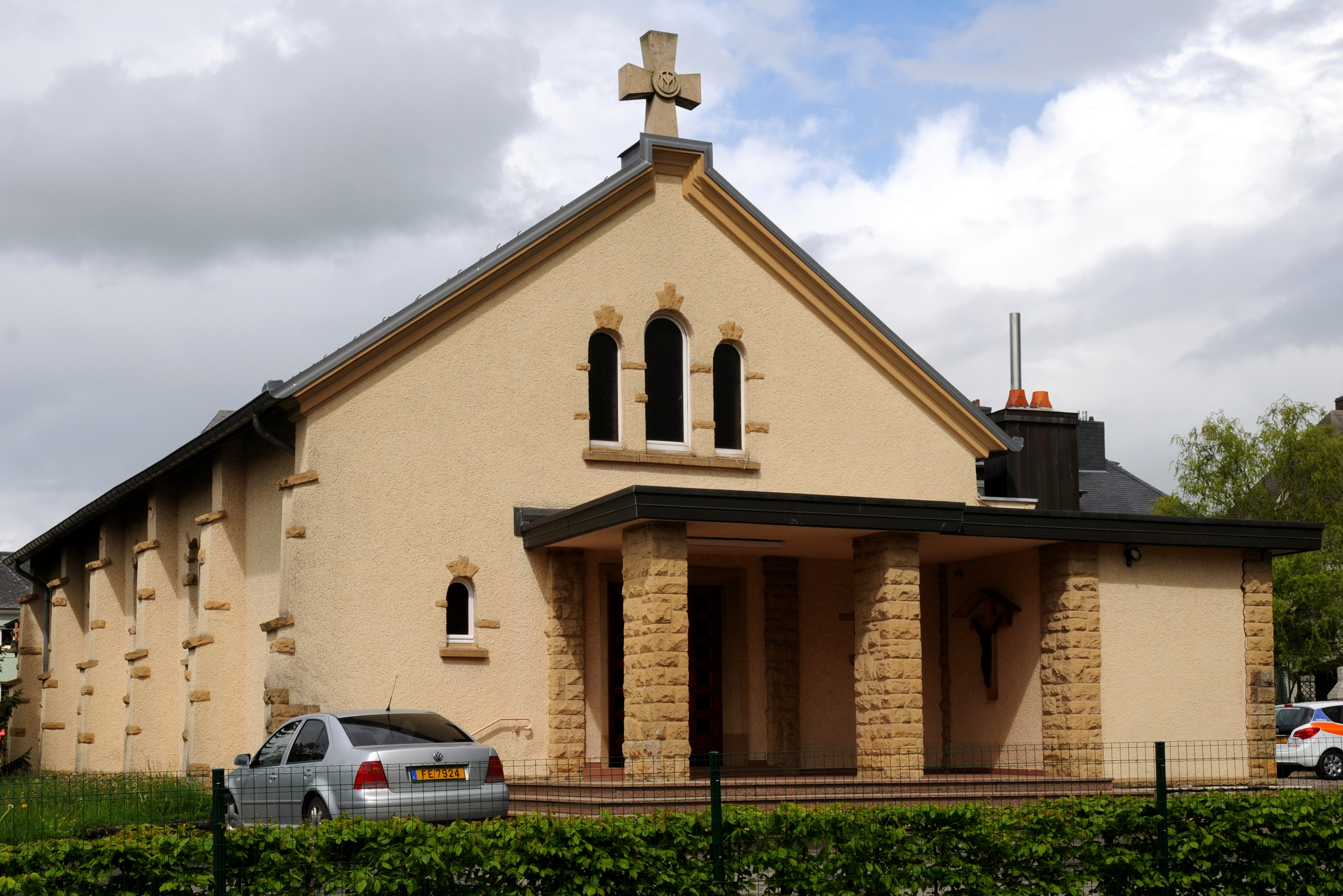
St. Joseph chapel in Burange

Burange (Note: Luxembourgish: Bireng, German: Büringen) is a neighbourhood in the north of Dudelange, in southern Luxembourg. It is the location of Stade J.F. Kennedy.

Burange is served by Dudelange-Burange railway station, one of Dudelange's four stations on CFL Line 60a. The neighbourhood is also located near the Dudelange-Burange roundabout, the second-largest in the country.

The area is largely residential with sports and transport infrastructure rather than being a standalone town.
