= Stade J.F. Kennedy =

Track and field stadium in Luxembourg

Coordinates: 49°29′22″N 06°05′22″E

Stade J.F. Kennedy is a municipal track and field and American football stadium in Dudelange, in southern Luxembourg. It is located in Burange, in the north of the city, and named after former U.S. President John F. Kennedy. The stadium is the home of the American football team Dudelange Steelers, which has hosted international tournaments there. It is also home of the athletics club CA Dudelange, which trains there during the summer season.
