= Beyren-lès-Sierck =

- Commune
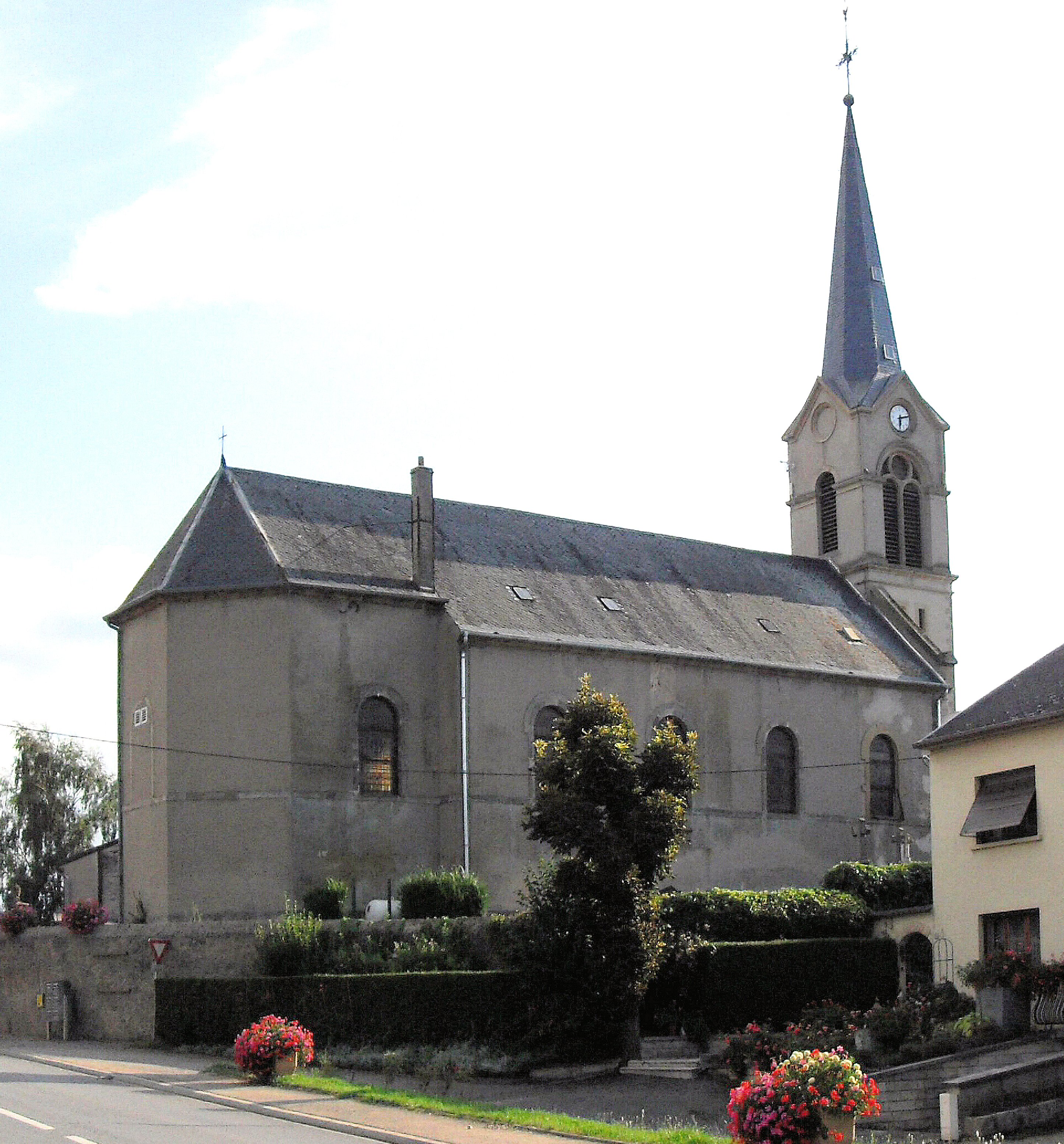
- The church in Beyren-lès-Sierck

- Coat of arms
- Location of Beyren-lès-Sierck
- Location within France Location within Grand Est
- Coordinates: 49°28′19″N 6°17′16″E
- Country: France
- Region: Grand Est
- Department: Moselle
- Arrondissement: Thionville
- Canton: Yutz
- Intercommunality: Cattenom et environs

Government
  - Mayor (2020–2026): Philippe Gaillot
- Area^{1}: 9.28 km^{2} (3.58 sq mi)
- Elevation: 162 m (531 ft)
- Highest elevation: 268 m (879 ft)
- Lowest elevation: 154 m (505 ft)
- Population (2023): 551
  - Density: 59.4/km^{2} (154/sq mi)
- Time zone: UTC+01:00 (CET)
  - Summer (DST): UTC+02:00 (CEST)
- INSEE/Postal code: 57076 /57570
- ^{1} French Land Register data, which excludes lakes, ponds, glaciers > 1 km^{2} (0.386 sq mi or 247 acres) and river estuaries.

Beyren-lès-Sierck (French pronunciation: [bɛʁən lɛ siʁk], lit. 'Beyren near Sierck'; German: Beiern) is a commune in the Moselle department in Grand Est in northeastern France.

The locality of Gandren (German: Gandern) is incorporated in the commune since 1812.

== Population ==
Historical population
Year	Pop.	±% p.a.
1968	307	—
1975	308	+0.05%
1982	353	+1.97%
1990	430	+2.50%
1999	426	−0.10%
2007	467	+1.16%
2012	513	+1.90%
2017	517	+0.16%
2023	551	+1.07%
Source: INSEE

== See also ==
- Communes of the Moselle department
