= Howald =

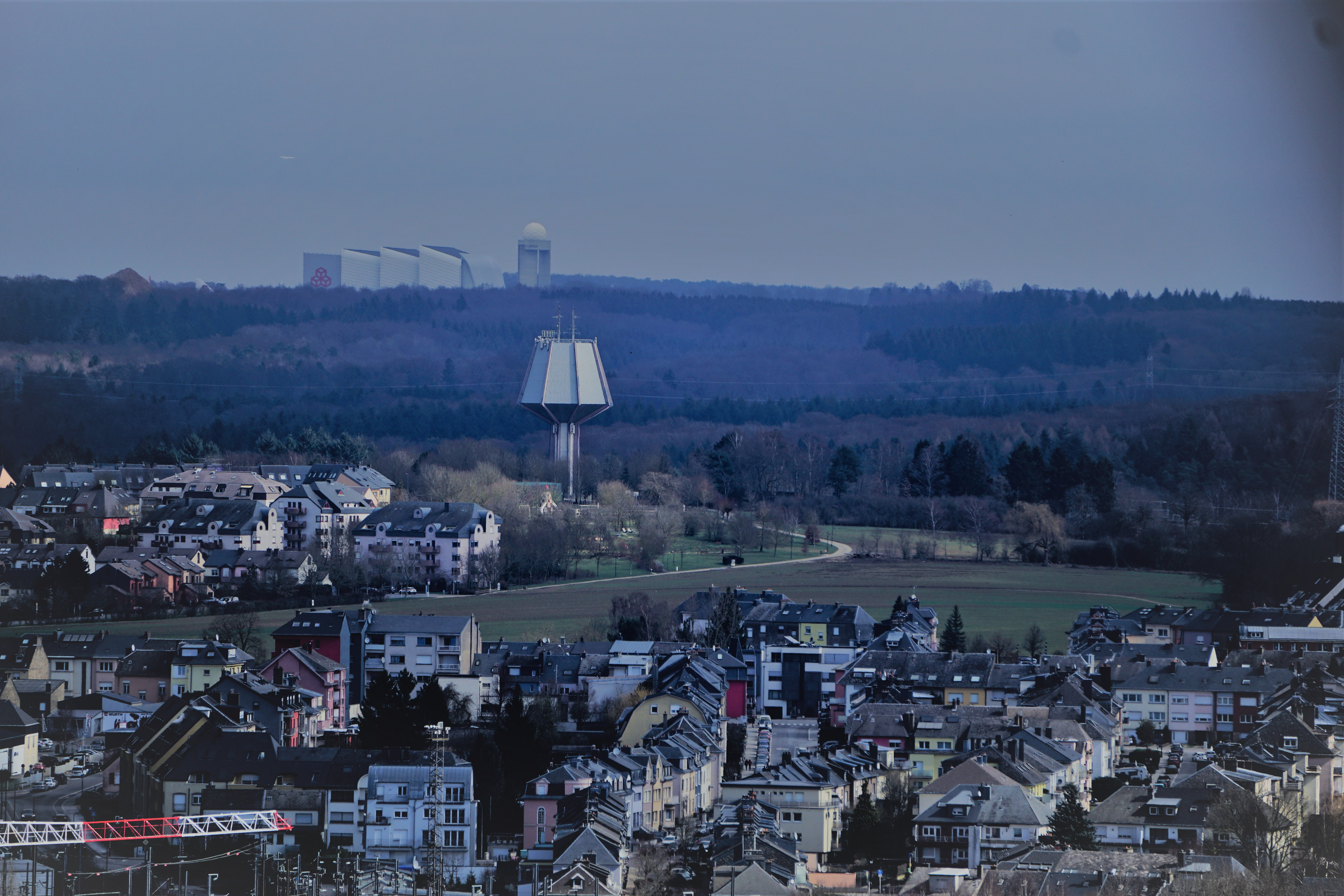
- Interactive map of Howald
- Coordinates: 49°35′03″N 06°08′28″E
- Country: Luxembourg
- Canton: Canton of Luxembourg
- Commune: Hesperange

Population (2025)
  - Total: 5,914

Howald (German pronunciation: [ˈhoːvalt]; Luxembourgish: Houwald) is a town in the commune of Hesperange, in southern Luxembourg. The town merges almost seamlessly with Luxembourg City's south-eastern suburban quarter of South Bonnevoie, which lies to the north of Howald. As of September 2026, the town has a population of 5,949, making it the most populous town in the commune and the 22nd-most populous in Luxembourg.

Through Howald runs the route de Thionville, one of Luxembourg's historically most-important roads, which runs from Luxembourg City to the French town of Thionville (which had been a part of Luxembourg until 1659). However, for cross-border travel, this has since been supplanted by the A3 motorway, which connects the same two cities via Bettembourg and Dudelange, and the northern terminus of which is just to the west of the town, on the other side of the railway track. A railway station opened in Howald in December 2017.

From 20 February 1882 until 22 May 1955 a steam railway line from Luxembourg to Remich ran alongside the route de Thionville through Howald. The train was affectionately referred to as the "Jangeli", a name evoking the sound that the train made. The name Jangeli is still maintained as the bus stop location on the Route de Thionville in Howald.

Howald's role as a suburb of Luxembourg City is highlighted by the town's youth. As recently as 1885, the town had a population of only 21 people. Even until the Second World War, the town was limited almost exclusively to lining the sides of the route de Thionville. However, since the 1960s, the creation of two development zoning areas, on either side of the route de Thionville, has seen the town expand dramatically, such that it is now the largest town in the commune of Hesperange.
