= Évrange =

- Commune
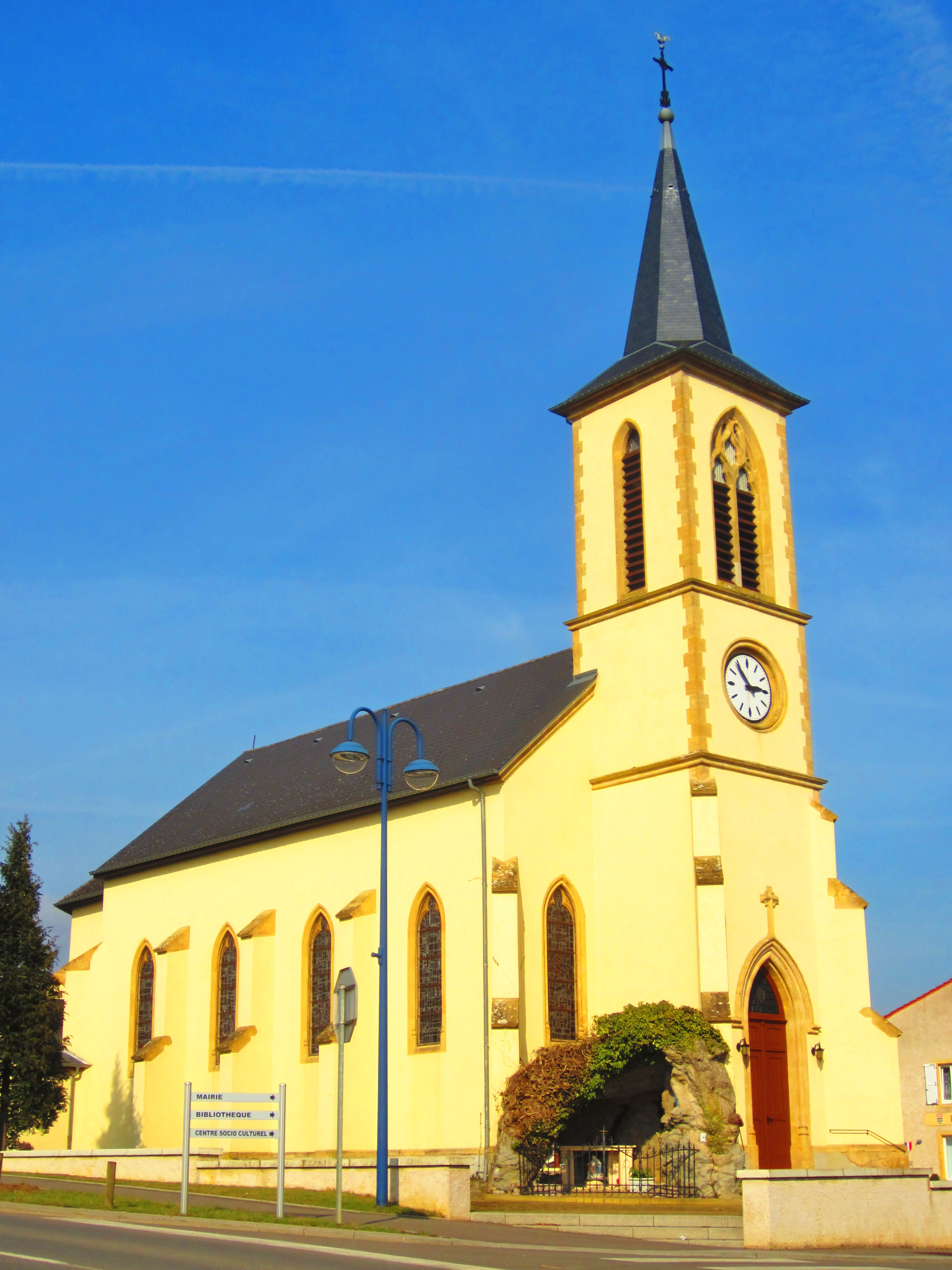
- The church in Évrange

- Coat of arms
- Location of Évrange
- Location within France Location within Grand Est
- Coordinates: 49°30′07″N 6°11′46″E
- Country: France
- Region: Grand Est
- Department: Moselle
- Arrondissement: Thionville
- Canton: Yutz
- Intercommunality: Cattenom et environs

Government
  - Mayor (2020–2026): Thierry Michel
- Area^{1}: 2.25 km^{2} (0.87 sq mi)
- Elevation: 300 m (980 ft)
- Highest elevation: 272 m (892 ft)
- Lowest elevation: 229 m (751 ft)
- Population (2023): 246
  - Density: 109/km^{2} (283/sq mi)
- Time zone: UTC+01:00 (CET)
  - Summer (DST): UTC+02:00 (CEST)
- INSEE/Postal code: 57203 /57570
- ^{1} French Land Register data, which excludes lakes, ponds, glaciers > 1 km^{2} (0.386 sq mi or 247 acres) and river estuaries.

Évrange (French pronunciation: [evʁɑ̃ʒ]; German: Ewringen) is a commune in the Moselle department in Grand Est in north-eastern France.

== Transportation ==
Évrange is served by the N53 Route nationale.

== See also ==
- Communes of the Moselle department
