= Bettembourg railway station =

Railway station in Luxembourg

Bettembourg Beetebuerg
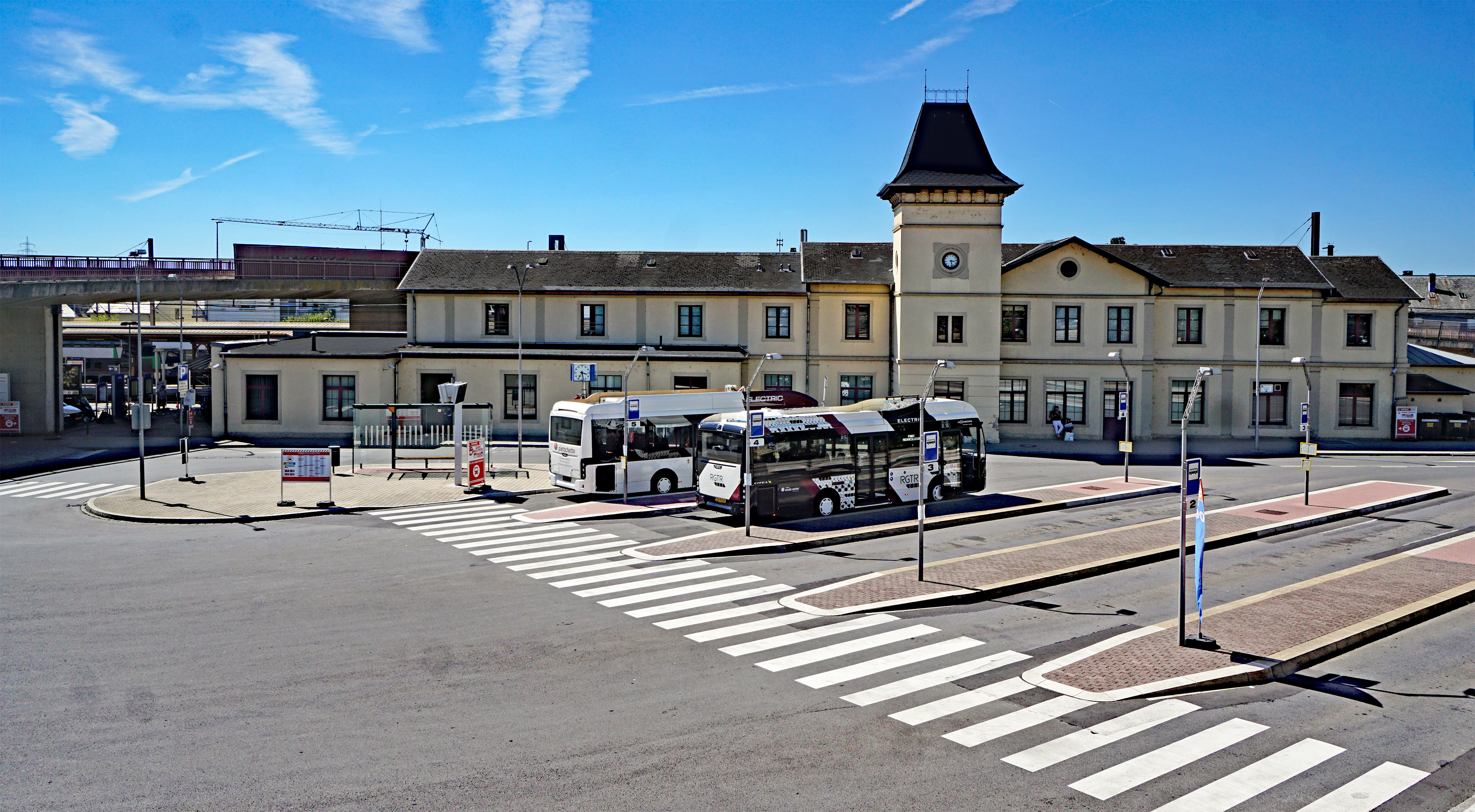
- The station building in 2022

General information
- Location: Cour de la Gare, L-3201 Bettembourg; Luxembourg
- Coordinates: 49°31′00″N 6°06′06″E
- Elevation: 276 m (906 ft)
- Owner: Luxembourg
- Operator: CFL; SNCF
- Platforms: 3

History
- Opened: 11 August 1859

Passengers
- 2022: 3,495,828
- Rank: 2 of 60

Services
Preceding station	CFL	Following station
Berchem towards Luxembourg	Line 60	Noertzange towards Rodange
Terminus	Line 60A	Dudelange-Burange towards Volmerange-les-Mines
Preceding station	TER Grand Est	Following station
Hettange-Grande towards Metz	L01b	Howald towards Luxembourg
Location

Bettembourg railway station (Luxembourgish: Gare Beetebuerg, French: Gare de Bettembourg, German: Bahnhof Bettemburg) is a railway station serving Bettembourg, in southern Luxembourg. It is operated by Chemins de Fer Luxembourgeois, the state-owned railway company.

The station is situated on Line 60, which connects Luxembourg City to the Red Lands of the south of the country. It is the main junction for Line 60, with the line splitting into three separate branches after Bettembourg.

As of 2022, it was the second-busiest station in Luxembourg, with close to 3.5 million passengers that year.
