= List of cities in Luxembourg =

Cities in Luxembourg highlighted amongst all communes in the country.

There are twelve cities in Luxembourg, as defined by statute. Despite the status as cities, they are not all contiguous urbanised areas. They are communes that have been granted an honorific title by law. There is a technical difference between the status of commune and city, but this is limited in practicality. One difference is that aldermen in cities are formally appointed by the Grand Duke, whereas aldermen for other communes are appointed by the Minister for Internal Affairs.

== Terminology ==
The officially used terms for a city in the sense of this article are Stad (plural Stied) in Luxembourgish, Stadt (plural Städte) in German, and ville (plural villes) in French.

== History ==
Historically, this status was derived from a city's possession of a city charter, but city rights are now granted and regulated by statute. In the modern era, the status was first conferred on 24 February 1843, when seven of the eight cities that had previously been granted charters were reinstated as cities (Clervaux was not). They were (in the order given in the law): Luxembourg City, Diekirch, Grevenmacher, Echternach, Wiltz, Vianden, and Remich.

For over sixty years, no more cities were added, but the vast demographic shift during the last part of the nineteenth century made it impossible to leave the arrangements unchanged. Thus, on 29 May 1906, Esch-sur-Alzette was promoted; Esch was followed by Differdange, Dudelange, Ettelbruck, and Rumelange on 4 August 1907. An area of the (now extinct) commune of Hollerich was conferred the title on 7 April 1914, under the title of Hollerich-Bonnevoie; this status was lost when Hollerich was merged into Luxembourg City on 26 March 1920.

The last such statute affecting city status in Luxembourg was the Loi communale du 13 décembre 1988. In the order outlined in that legislation (i.e. alphabetical, except with Luxembourg City first), the twelve communes with city status are: Luxembourg City, Diekirch, Differdange, Dudelange, Echternach, Esch-sur-Alzette, Ettelbruck, Grevenmacher, Remich, Rumelange, Vianden, and Wiltz.

In spite of their city status, some of the municipalities are very small and more like villages or small towns. There are also municipalities without city status that have more inhabitants than several of the official cities (especially in the Luxembourg City and Red Lands urban areas, but also elsewhere, such as Mersch). Apart from the capital, Luxembourg City, which is a city with now over 135,000 inhabitants, only the three or five next largest municipalities (Esch-sur-Alzette, Differdange, Dudelange, plus possibly Ettelbruck and Diekirch) have long been urbanised enough to be described as cities. However, most municipalities are now growing with the continuously high figures of immigration to Luxembourg. There is a town planning project that aims at developing Ettelbruck, Diekirch and four bordering municipalities into a new centre called Nordstad ("North City") with an expected population of 30,000.

In 2026, responding to a parliamentary inquiry from DP deputy André Bauler, Internal Affairs minister Léon Gloden (himself the former mayor of Grevenmacher, a commune with city status) stated that there were no plans to grant new communes the city title or to establish formal conditions for the title. He cited the fact that the title carries with it no added value, and that the government's priority was to encourage commune mergers.

== List of cities ==
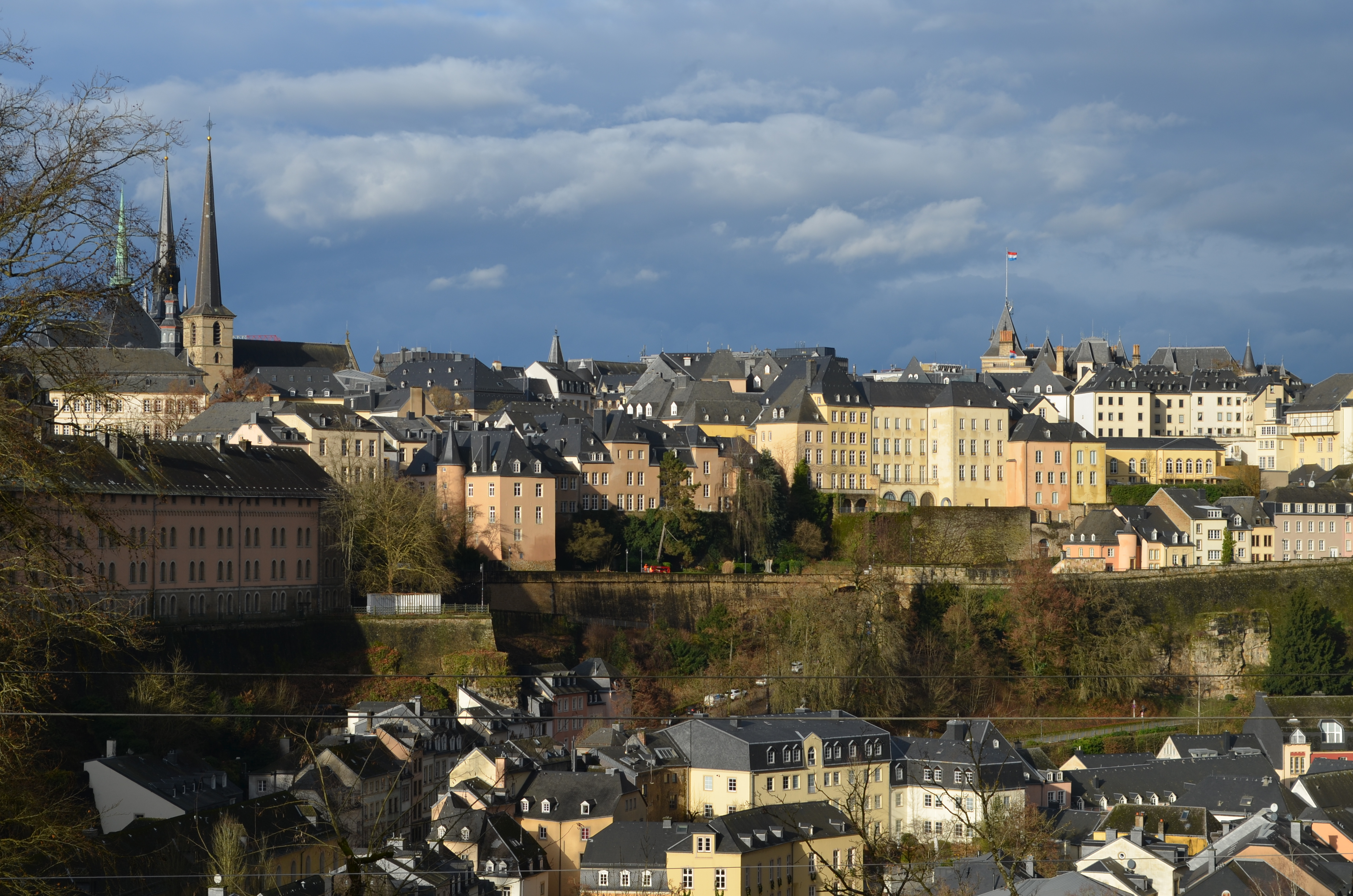
Luxembourg City

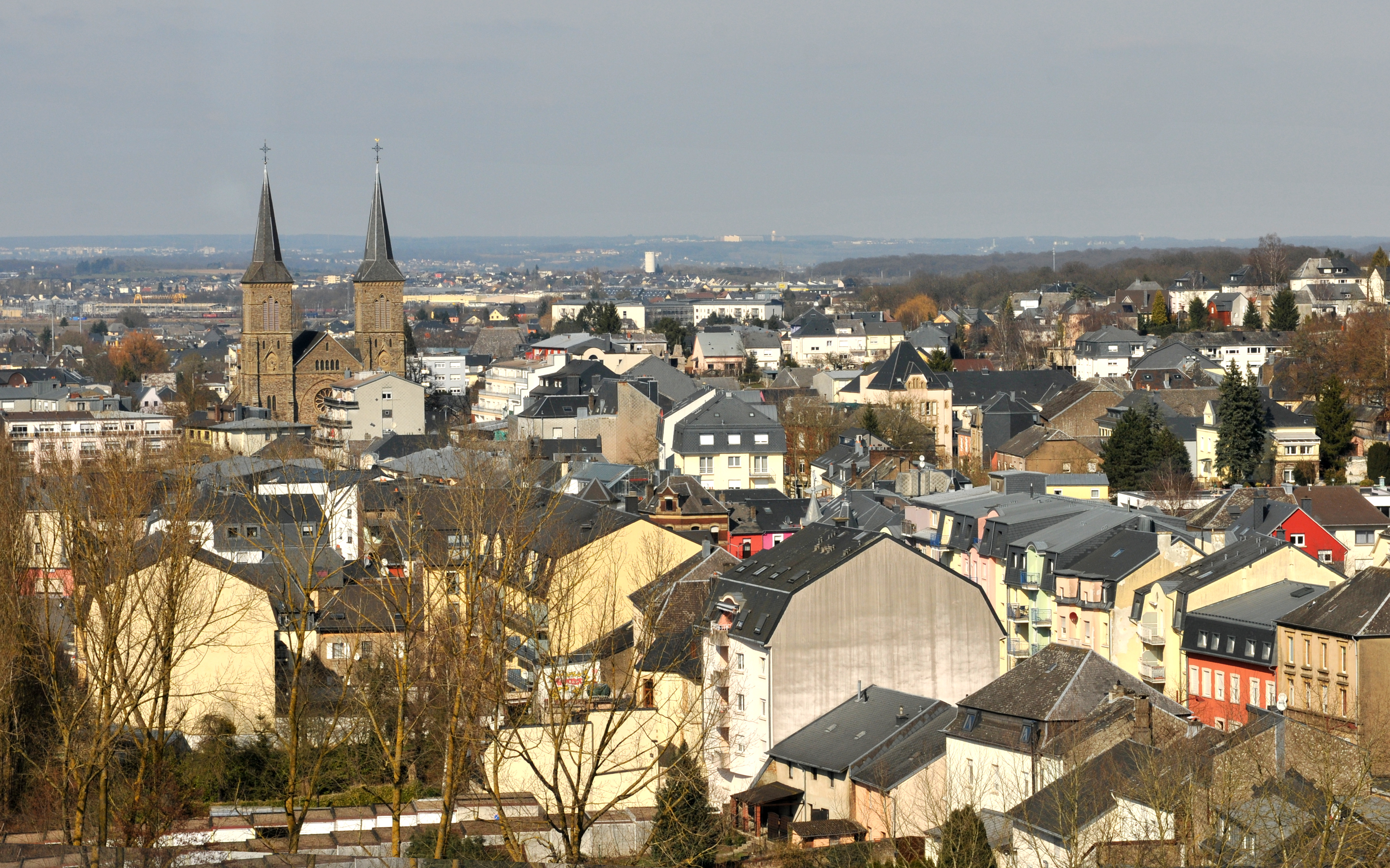
Dudelange

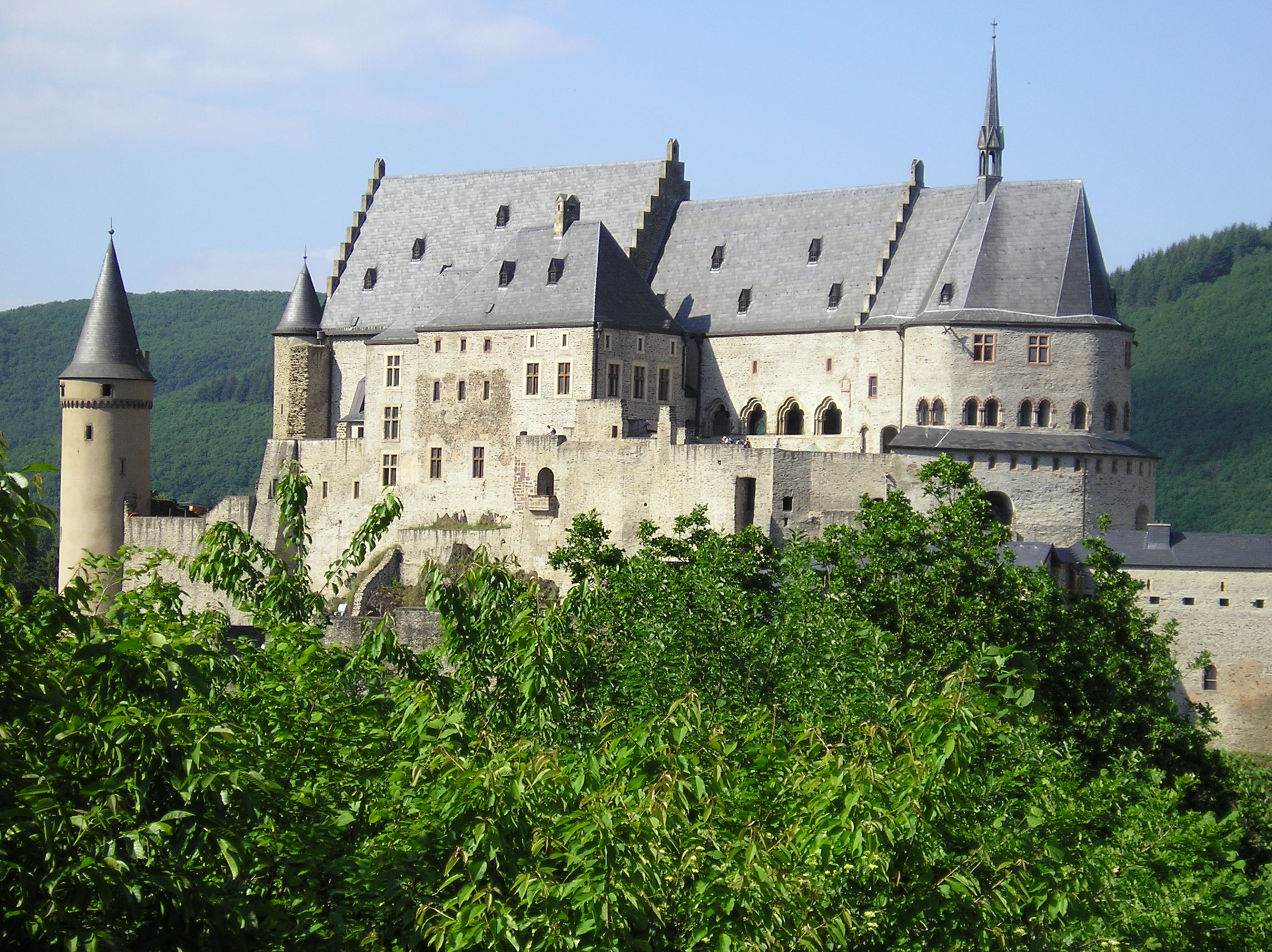
Vianden

Coat of arms	Name	Canton	Area (km^{2})	Population (As of 2025)	Date of law
	Diekirch Dikrech, Dikrich	Diekirch	12.42	7,336	24 February 1843
	Differdange Déifferdeng, Déifferdang	Esch-sur-Alzette	22.18	30,789	4 August 1907
	Dudelange Diddeleng	Esch-sur-Alzette	21.38	22,203	4 August 1907
	Echternach Iechternach, Eechternoach	Echternach	20.49	5,936	24 February 1843
	Esch-sur-Alzette Esch-Uelzecht	Esch-sur-Alzette	14.35	37,922	29 May 1906
	Ettelbruck Ettelbréck	Diekirch	15.18	10,149	4 August 1907
	Grevenmacher Gréiwemaacher	Grevenmacher	16.48	5,274	24 February 1843
	Luxembourg Lëtzebuerg	Luxembourg	51.46	136,161	24 February 1843
	Remich Réimech	Remich	5.29	4,149	24 February 1843
	Rumelange Rëmeleng	Esch-sur-Alzette	6.83	5,735	4 August 1907
	Vianden Veianen, Veinen	Vianden	9.67	2,221	24 February 1843
	Wiltz Wolz, Wooltz	Wiltz	19.37	8,310	24 February 1843

== See also ==
- List of populated places in Luxembourg
