= Volmerange-les-Mines railway station =

French railway station

Coordinates: 49°27′23″N 06°04′44″E

Volmerange-les-Mines
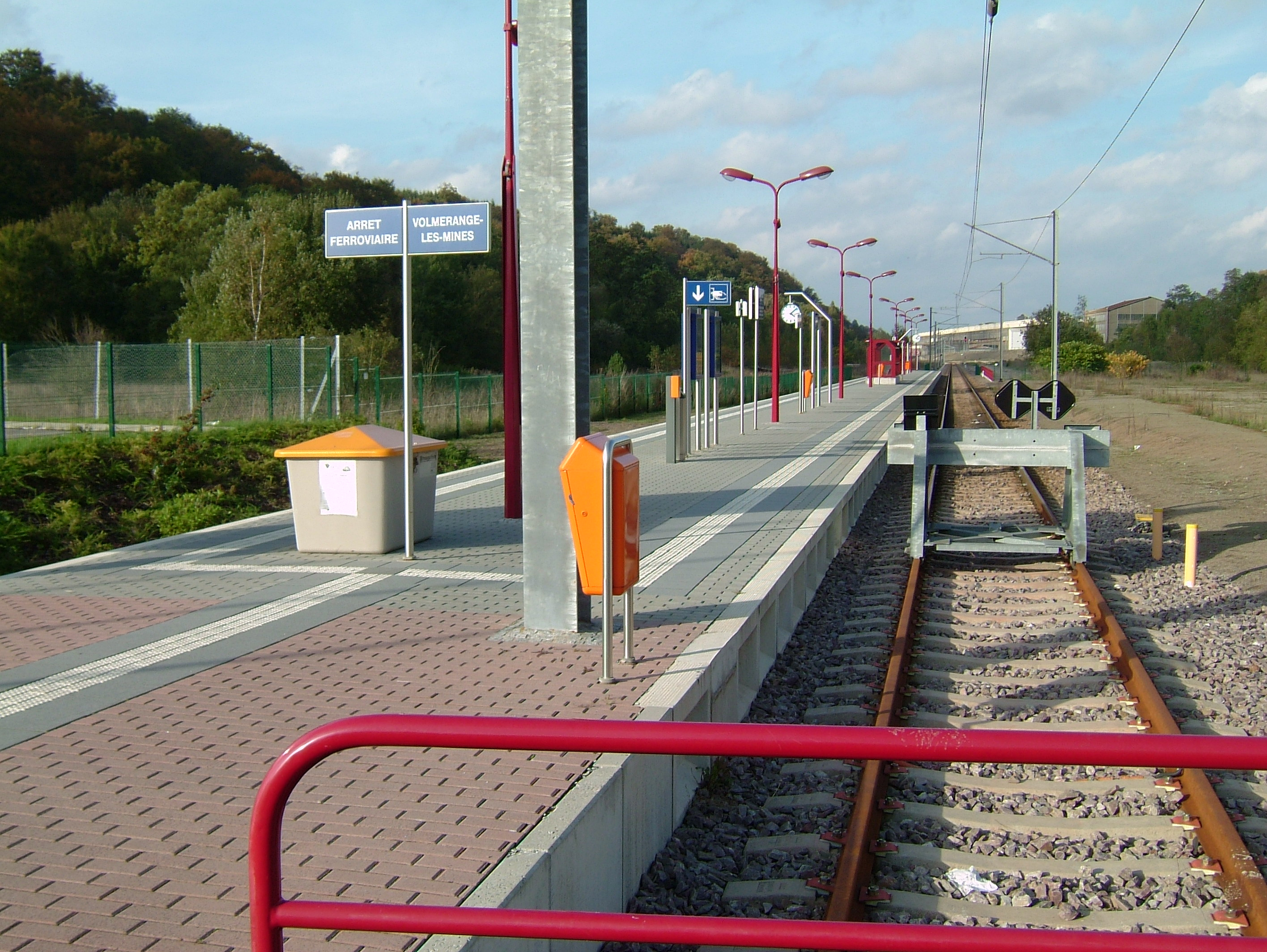
- Station in 2006.

General information
- Operated by: Chemins de Fer Luxembourgeois

History
- Opened: 15 December 2003
Location

Volmerange-les-Mines railway station (French: Gare de Volmerange-les-Mines) is a railway station serving Volmerange-les-Mines, in the north of the Moselle department in France. The station was opened on 15 December 2003, after the existing line from Bettembourg to Dudelange was extended. It is operated by Chemins de Fer Luxembourgeois, the state-owned railway company, despite the fact that it is located in France. That is due to the fact that it is only connected to the Luxembourg rail network and is not directly connected to the French one.

The station is the terminus of CFL Line 60A, which connects Volmerange-les-Mines with Dudelange and Bettembourg, where connections towards Luxembourg City and Esch-sur-Alzette exist. A bus service (line S10 of Citéline) connects the station with Hettange-Grande, Thionville and Yutz.

Preceding station	CFL	Following station
Dudelange-Usines towards Bettembourg	Line 60A	Terminus
