= Volmerange-les-Mines =

- Commune
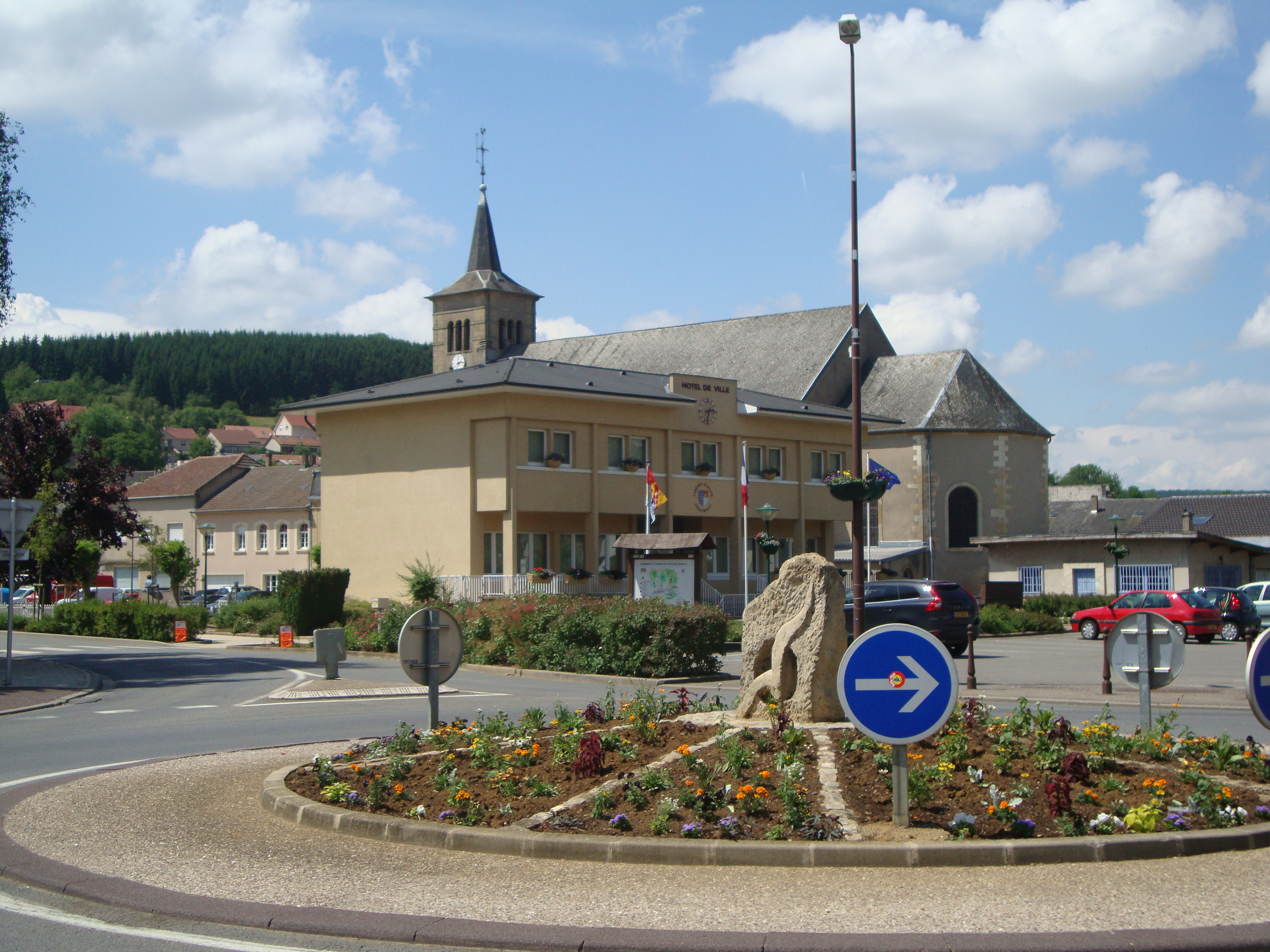
- The town hall and church in Volmerange-les-Mines

- Coat of arms
- Location of Volmerange-les-Mines
- Location within France Location within Grand Est
- Coordinates: 49°26′35″N 6°04′52″E
- Country: France
- Region: Grand Est
- Department: Moselle
- Arrondissement: Thionville
- Canton: Yutz
- Intercommunality: Cattenom et environs

Government
  - Mayor (2020–2026): Maurice Lorentz
- Area^{1}: 12.92 km^{2} (4.99 sq mi)
- Highest elevation: 429 m (1,407 ft)
- Lowest elevation: 294 m (965 ft)
- Population (2023): 2,289
  - Density: 177.2/km^{2} (458.9/sq mi)
- Time zone: UTC+01:00 (CET)
  - Summer (DST): UTC+02:00 (CEST)
- INSEE/Postal code: 57731 /57330
- ^{1} French Land Register data, which excludes lakes, ponds, glaciers > 1 km^{2} (0.386 sq mi or 247 acres) and river estuaries.

Volmerange-les-Mines (French pronunciation: [vɔlməʁɑ̃ʒ le min]; German: Wollmeringen [ˈvɔlməʁɪŋən]; Luxembourgish: Wuelmereng [ˈvu̯əlməʀeŋ]; Lorraine Franconian: Wuelmeréngen/Wollmeréng) is a commune in the region of Moselle department in Grand Est in north-eastern France.

It lies on the international border with Luxembourg, with the settlement being almost contiguous with the Luxembourgish town of Dudelange. The Volmerange-les-Mines railway station offers connections to Bettembourg in Luxembourg.

== Population ==
Historical population
Year	Pop.	±% p.a.
1968	1,511	—
1975	1,607	+0.88%
1982	1,767	+1.37%
1990	1,755	−0.09%
1999	1,725	−0.19%
2007	2,031	+2.06%
2012	2,018	−0.13%
2017	2,189	+1.64%
2023	2,289	+0.75%
Source: INSEE

== Twin towns – sister cities ==
Volmerange-les-Mines is twinned with:

- Calusco d'Adda, Italy
- Saint-Genest-d'Ambière, France

== See also ==
- Communes of the Moselle department
