= Red Lands =

Region of Luxembourg

Coordinates: 49°N 6°E

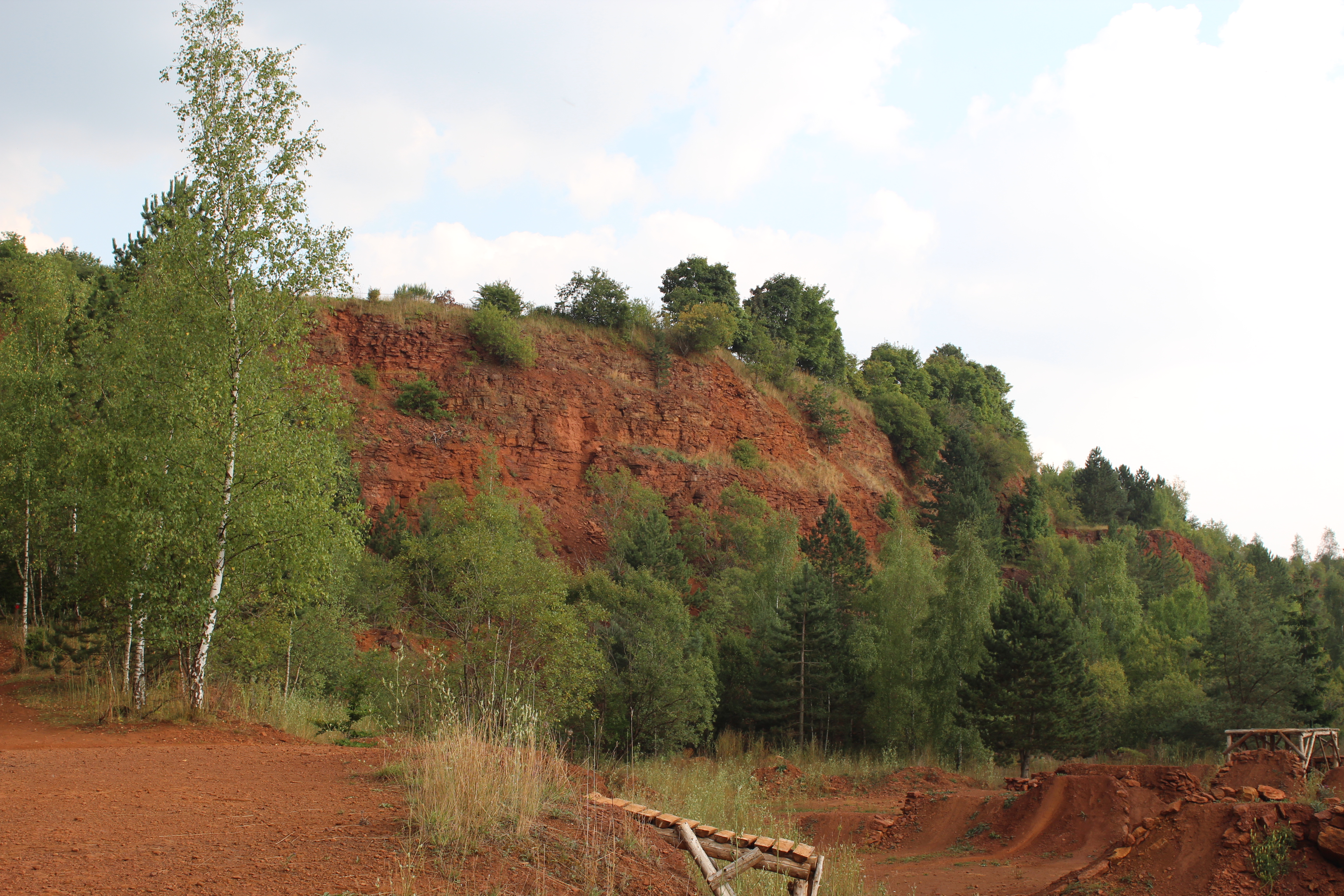
Typical red soil near Schifflange

The Red Lands (Luxembourgish: Minettsgéigend, Minett) form a geographic region in southern and south-western Luxembourg. They are so called for their red iron-laden earth. The Red Lands roughly correspond with the southern part of the canton of Esch-sur-Alzette, along the border with France. Geologically, the Red Lands are sedimentary, mostly sandstones and conglomerates, formed in the Middle Jurassic epoch.

As one of the most prodigious iron-producing regions in Western Europe, the Red Lands developed a thriving local steel industry, which has now developed into ArcelorMittal, the world's largest producer of steel. Throughout the period of industrial decline, the Red Lands have diversified into production of construction materials, engineering services, and chemical manufacturing. The region is the most densely populated part of Luxembourg, with several of Luxembourg's largest towns and cities, including Bettembourg, Differdange, Dudelange, Esch-sur-Alzette, Kayl, and Schifflange, all of which have populations of above 10,000 people.
