= CFL Line 30 =

Railway line in Luxembourg

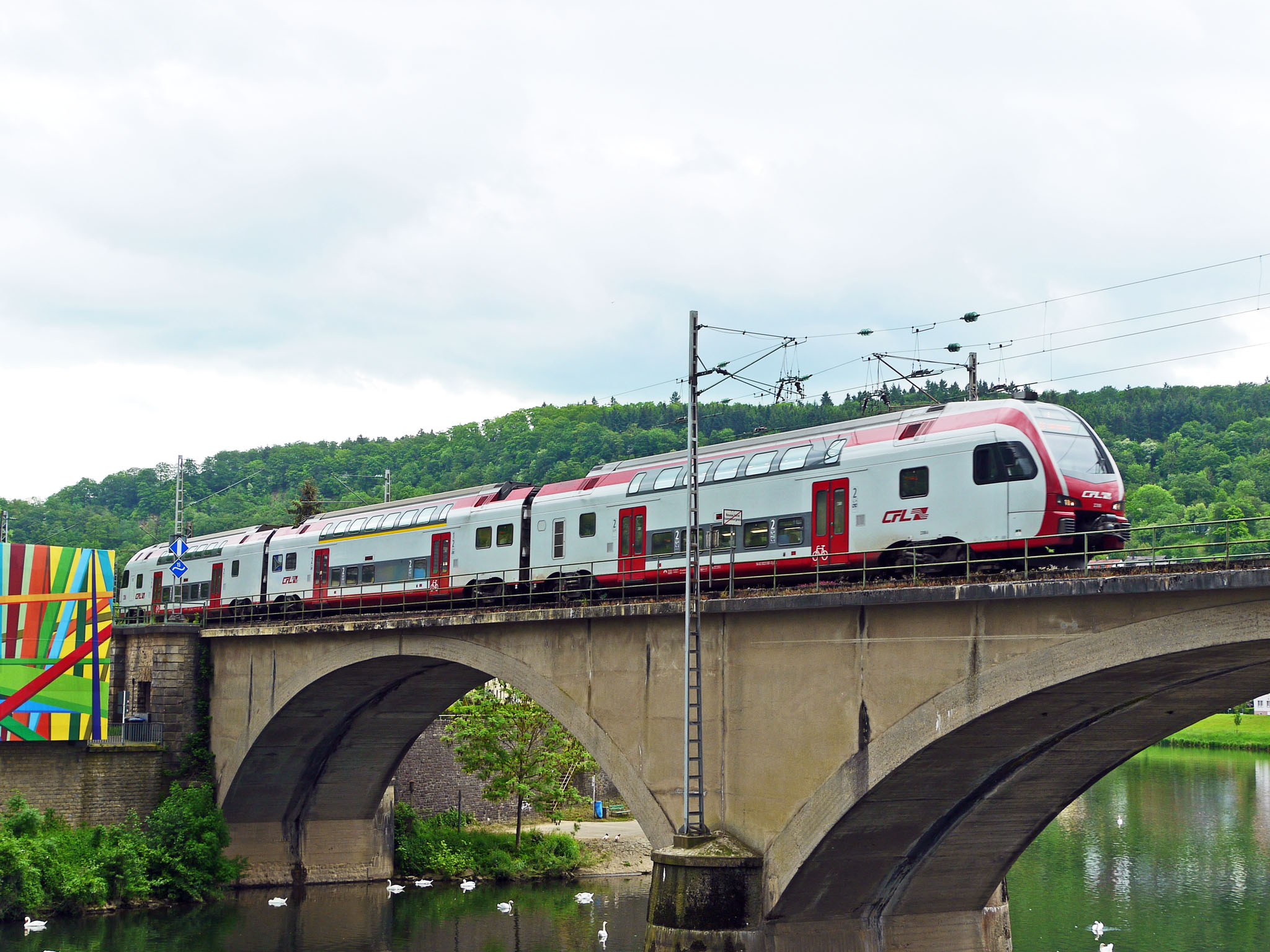
- A Class 2300 train crossing the Sauer at Wasserbillig

Overview
- Owner: CFL
- Locale: Luxembourg, Germany
- Termini: Luxembourg; Schweich

Service
- Operator(s): CFL, Deutsche Bahn

A map of the CFL network, with Line 30 in purple.

Line 30 is a Luxembourgish railway line connecting Luxembourg City to Wasserbillig, where it runs on the Trier West Railway, connecting to Trier in western Germany. The terminus at the western end is Luxembourg railway station. It is designated and predominantly operated by Chemins de Fer Luxembourgeois.

== Stations ==
- Luxembourg
- Cents-Hamm
- Sandweiler-Contern
- Oetrange
- Munsbach
- Roodt
- Betzdorf
- Wecker
- Manternach
- Mertert
- Wasserbillig
- Trier (Germany)
- Schweich (Germany)
