= Manternach =

- Commune
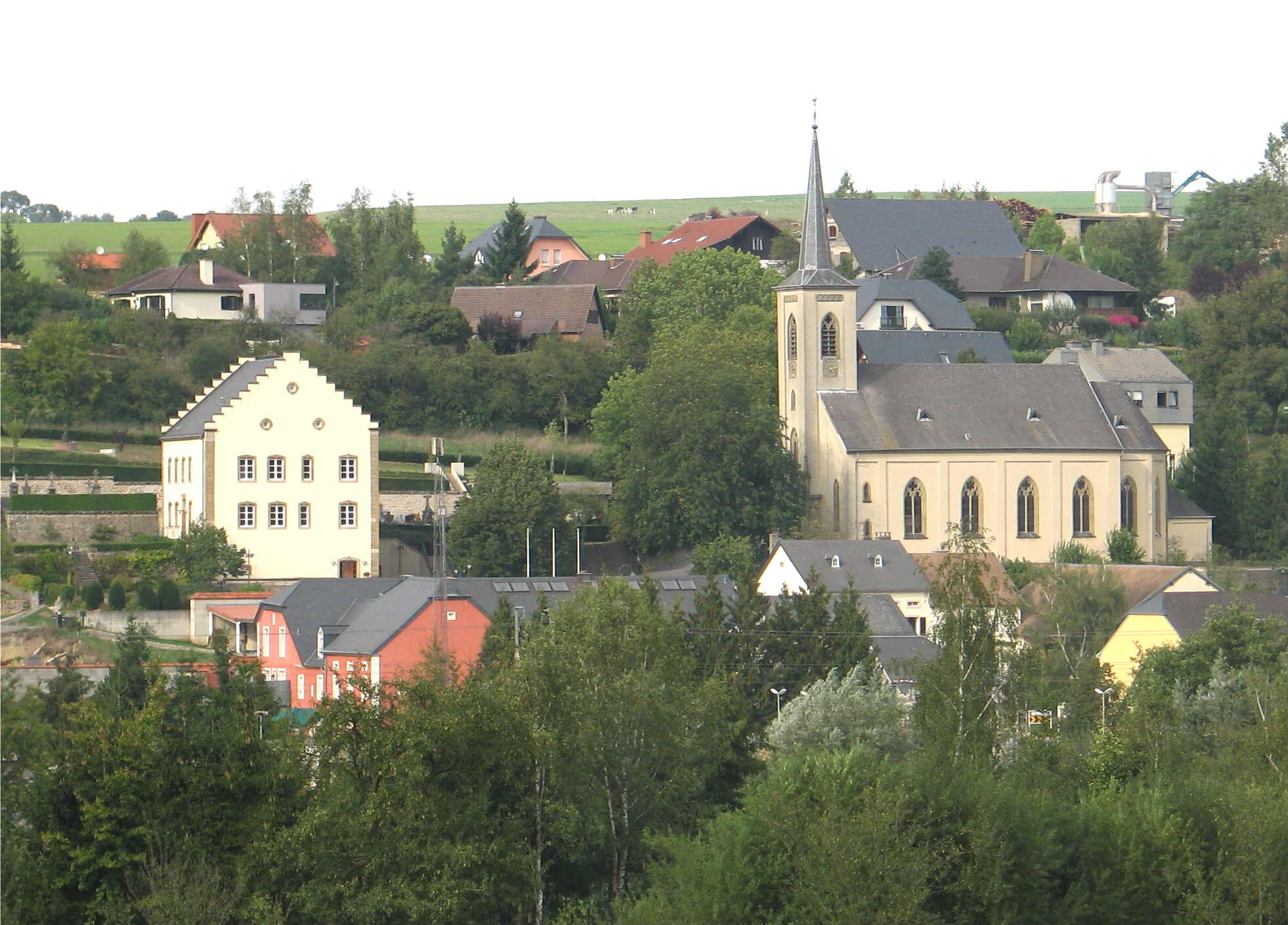

- Coat of arms

- Map of Luxembourg with Manternach highlighted in orange, and the canton in dark red
- Coordinates: 49.7069°N 6.4236°E
- Country: Luxembourg
- Canton: Grevenmacher

Government
  - Mayor: Jean-Pierre Hoffmann

Area
  - Total: 27.68 km^{2} (10.69 sq mi)
  - Rank: 30th of 100
- Highest elevation: 341 m (1,119 ft)
  - Rank: 87th of 100
- Lowest elevation: 181 m (594 ft)
  - Rank: 17th of 100

Population (2026)
  - Total: 2,311
  - Rank: 71st of 100
  - Density: 83.49/km^{2} (216.2/sq mi)
  - Rank: 75th of 100
- Time zone: UTC+1 (CET)
  - Summer (DST): UTC+2 (CEST)
- LAU 2: LU0001106
- Website: manternach.lu

Manternach (German pronunciation: [ˈmantɐnax]) is a commune and small town in eastern Luxembourg. It is part of the Grevenmacher canton

As of September 2026, the town of Manternach, which lies in the south of the commune, has a population of 728. Other towns within the commune include Berbourg, Lellig, and Munschecker.

Manternach railway station has regular services directly to Luxembourg City and Wasserbillig. There are approximately 35 trains per day travelling from Manternach to Luxembourg.

== Population ==
The population is very international, consisting of mostly farmers (active or retired). People from Germany, Poland, Senegal, Ethiopia, France, the Netherlands, Italy and other places live in Manternach. German or Luxembourgish languages are mostly used, sometimes French.

== Image gallery ==
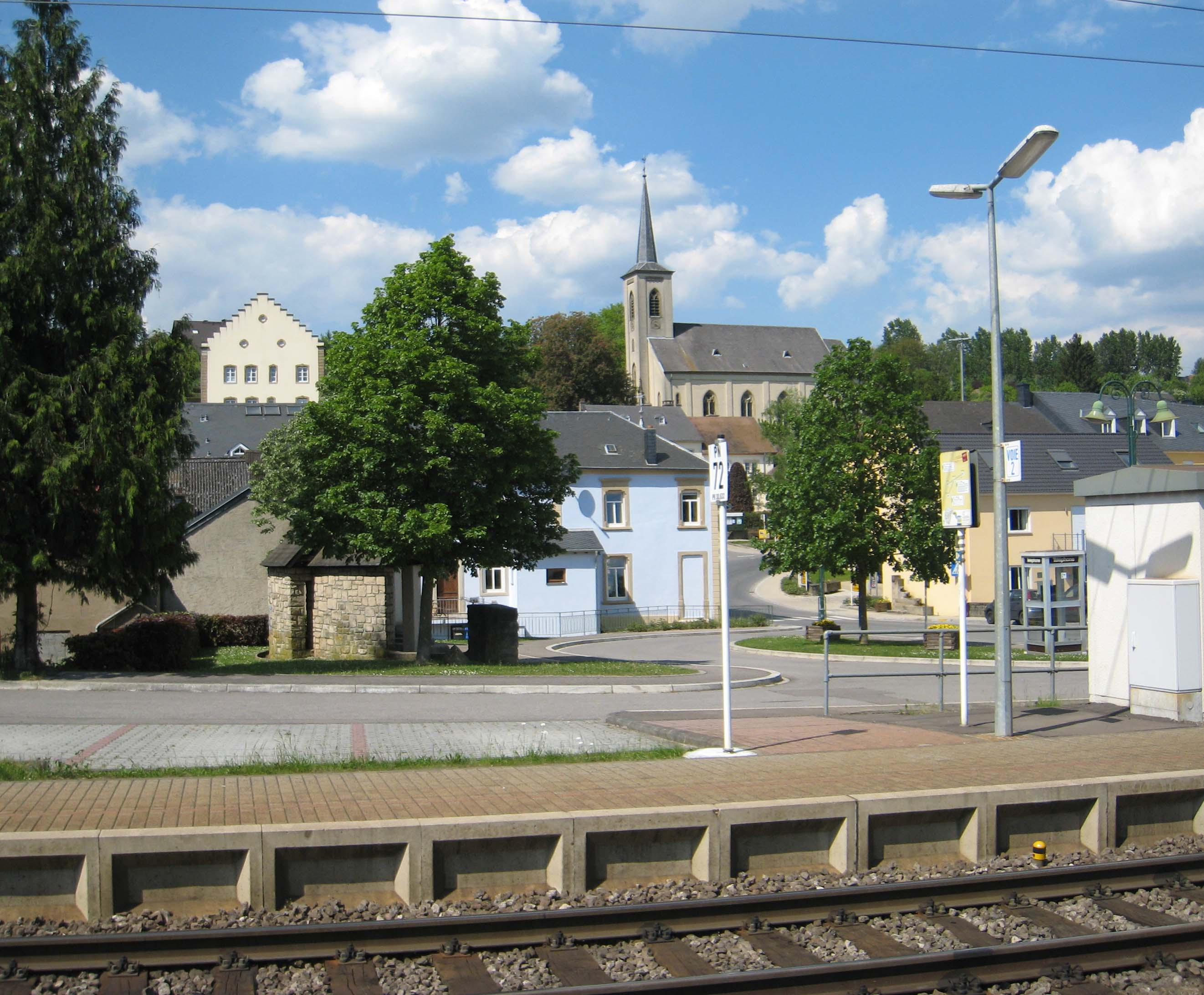
Manternach, seen from the railway station
