= Bettina Scholl-Sabbatini =

Luxembourgish sculptor, painter and ceramist

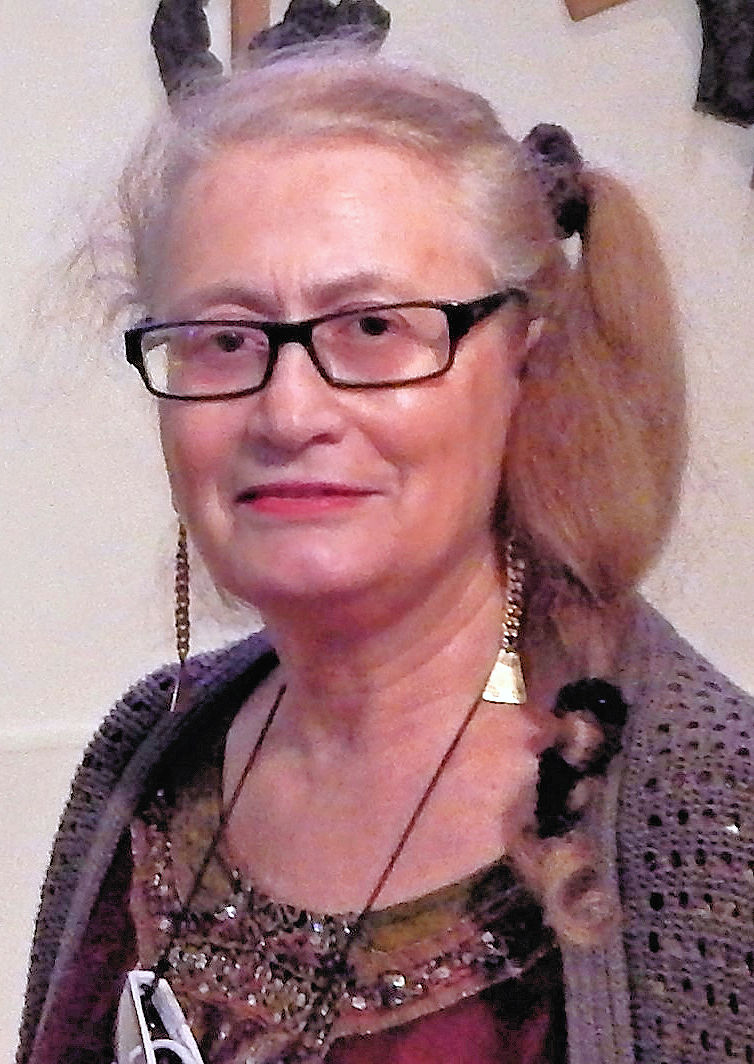
Bettina Scholl-Sabbatini

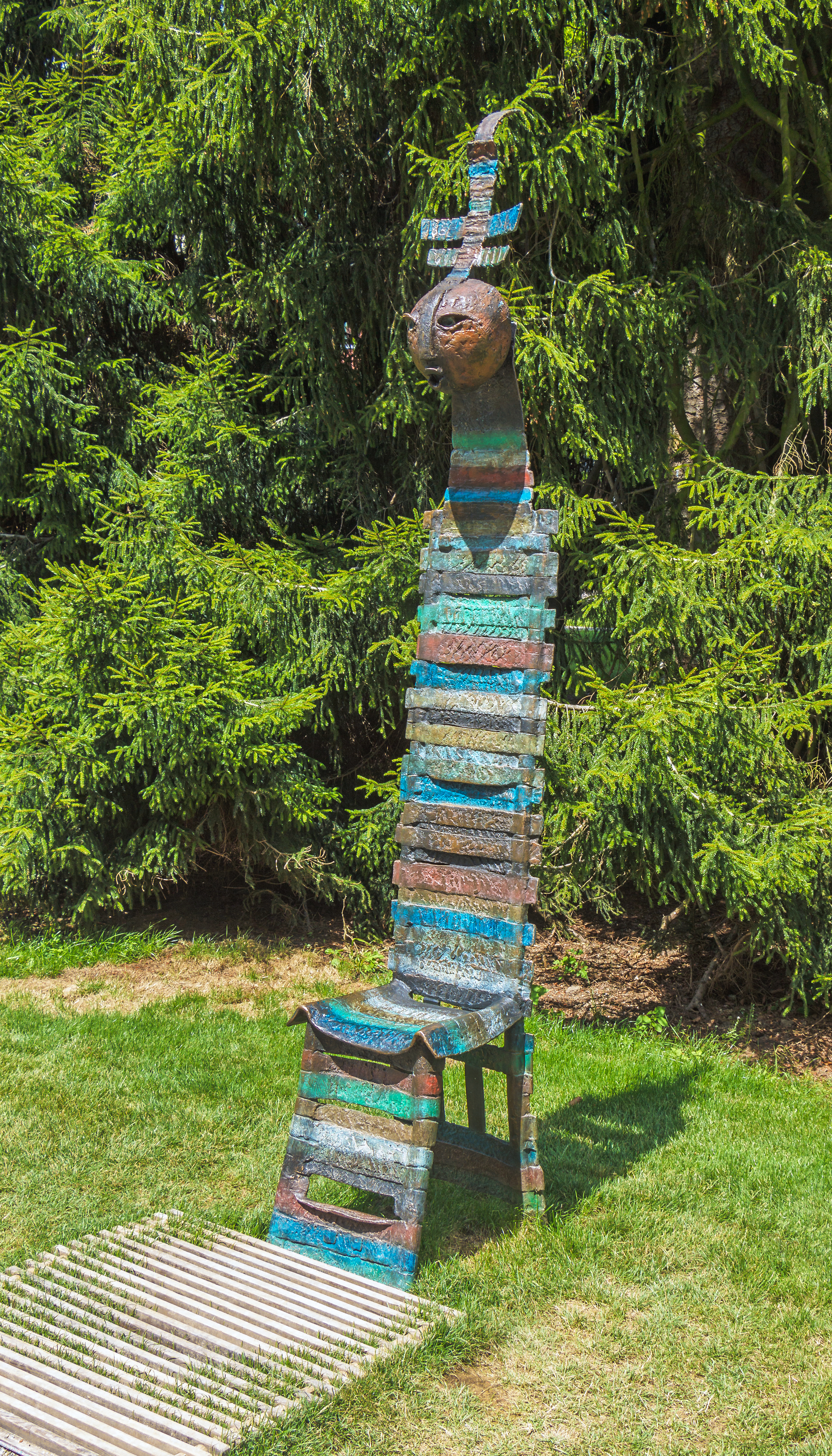
Bettina Scholl-Sabbatini's Chair, Spa park, Bad Herrenalb, Germany

Bettina Scholl-Sabbatini (born 1942) is a Luxembourgish sculptor, painter and ceramist. As a result of her participation in Soroptimist International Europa, where she served as vice-president from 2003 to 2005, she fostered an increasingly close relationship with Rwanda, where she has coordinated development projects following the Tutsi genocide. Her visits have also inspired her artistic designs. As a result, Rwanda exhibited her works at the 2010 Venice Biennale of Architecture.

== Biography ==
Born in Esch-sur-Alzette on 19 December 1942, Bettina Sabbatini was the daughter of the sculptor Aurelio Sabbatini (1909–1987). She studied ceramic art and sculpture at the Istituto Statale d’Arte di Sesto Fiorentino in Florence, Italy, (1963–1967) and at the Académie de la Grande Chaumière in Paris where she studied under Jérome and Brayer. She works with bronze, stone and loam and also paints. She has created works for public spaces and for many churches and chapels, including those in the Luxembourg localities of Bascharage, Bertrange, Dudelange, Lellig and Merl. Her work has been exhibited in Belgium, Denmark, France, Germany, Italy, Japan, Luxembourg, Sénégal and Spain.

== Awards ==
- 1987: Special prize from the Fonds Culturel National Luxembourgeois
- 1976: First Prize for Sculpture, Biennale des Jeunes, Luxembourg
