= Trier West Railway =

Railway in Europe

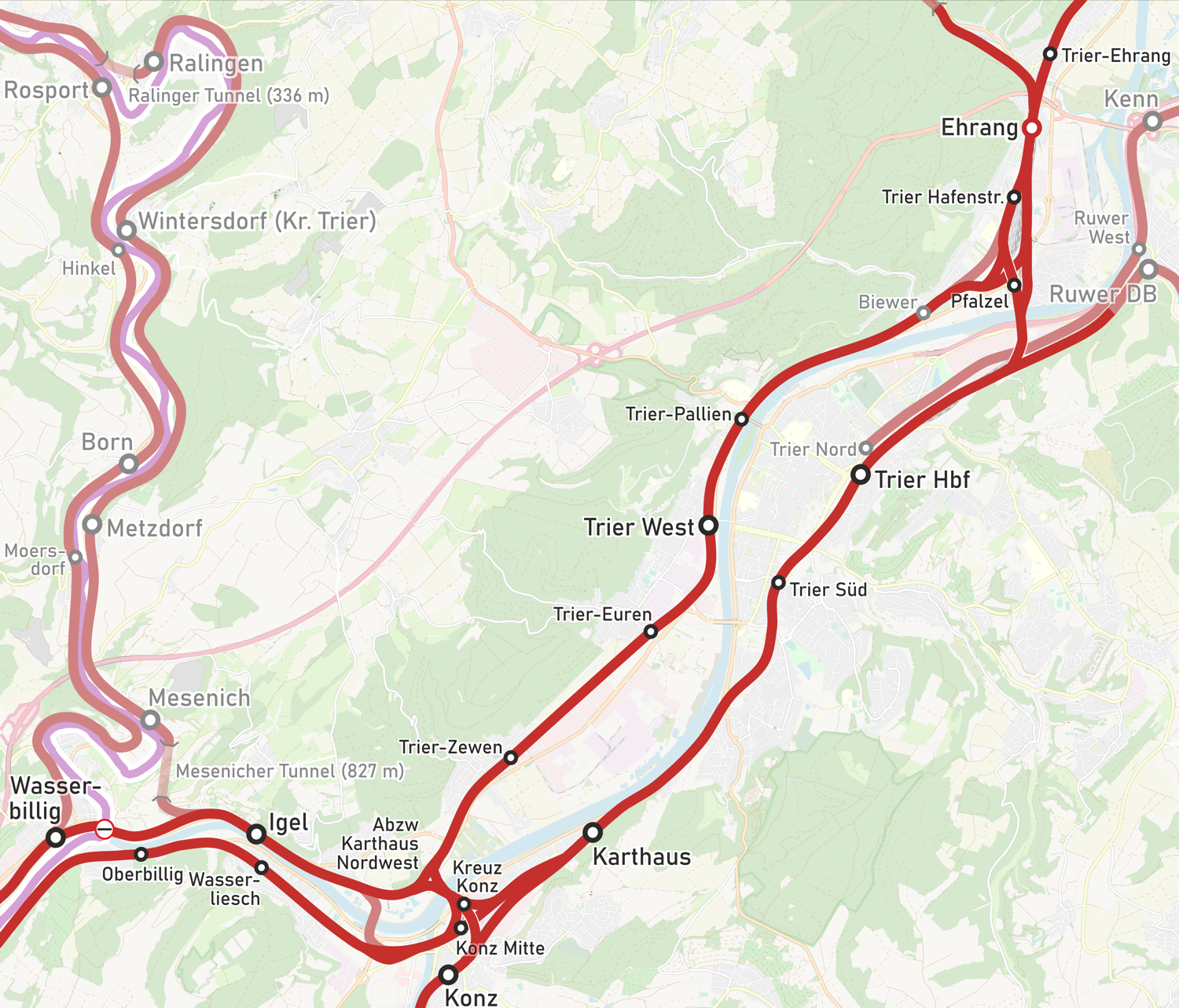

Overview
- Native name: Trierer Weststrecke
- Line number: 3140 Ehrang–Igel; 3141Ehrang–Biewer
- Locale: Rhineland-Palatinate, Germany and Luxembourg

Service
- Route number: last: 627; 263g (before 1970)

Technical
- Line length: 14 km (8.7 mi)
- Electrification: 15 kV/16.7 Hz AC overhead catenary
- Operating speed: 90 km/h (55.9 mph) (maximum)

The Trier West Railway (German: Trierer Weststrecke) a 14 km-long railway line running from Trier-Ehrang in the German state of Rhineland-Palatinate to Wasserbillig in Luxembourg via Trier-West. The double-track, electrified section between Trier-Ehrang and the Moselle bridge at Konz forms a bypass of the Trier rail node. The track was built from 1860 to 1870 and it had been used only for freight traffic from 1983 to 2025. The line was reopened with five train stations in 2025.

== History ==
In 1856, Prussia decided to build a railway line between Saarbrücken, Trier and Luxembourg. This decision was taken partly for military reasons, that is to connect the garrison at Trier and the Prussian Federal Fortress at Luxembourg with the Palatine Ludwig Railway opened in 1849, and partly for economic reasons. Firstly, it did not want international rail traffic to run via the French railway on the Metz–Thionville–Luxembourg route, which was under construction. Secondly, Prussia wanted to create new export opportunities for coal mining on the Saar, and specifically for the Dillinger Hütte (steelworks) and the Boch pottery in Mettlach.

Construction of the Saar Railway (Saarstrecke) started on 25 June 1856. The first section to Merzig was opened on 16 December 1858 and the remaining section to Trier was opened on 25 May 1860. At first, an express, three stopping trains and two freight trains a day operated between Trier and Saarbrücken. 15 months later, the remaining section between the Moselle bridge at Konz and the city of Luxembourg was opened on 29 August 1861. The total cost was approximately 5.6 million thalers.

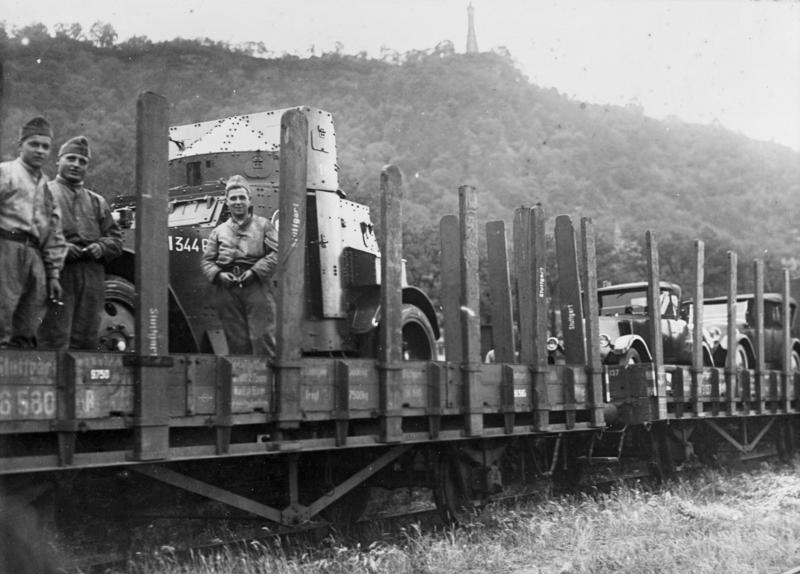
French troops leave Trier-West in June 1930

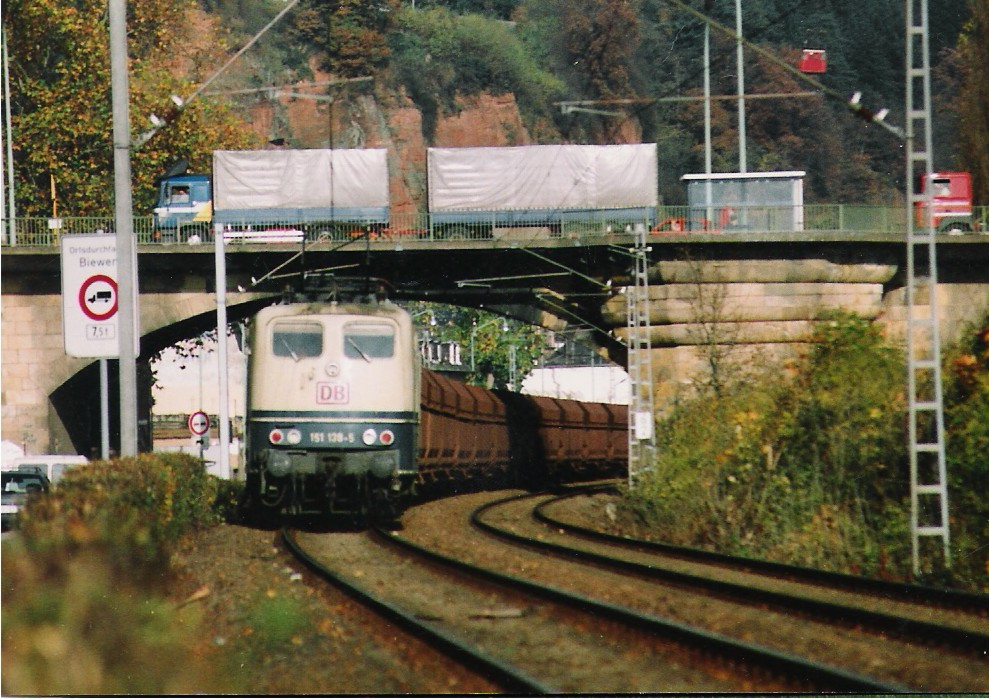
Ore train in Trier-Pallien in 1994

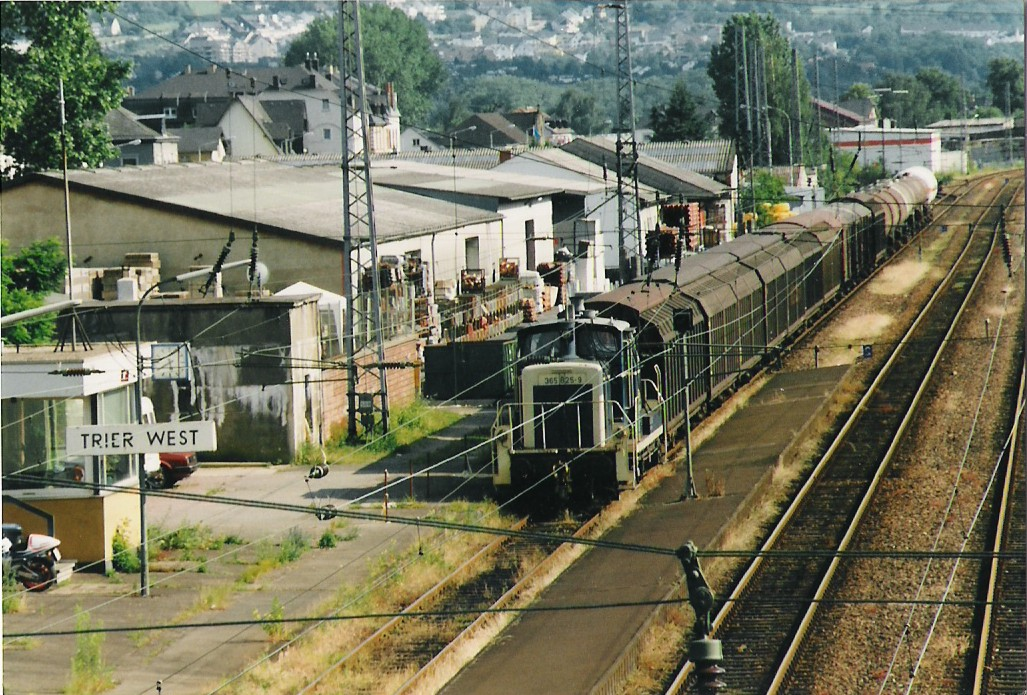
A freight exchange train in Trier-West in 1997

The private Rhenish Railway Company (Rheinische Eisenbahn-Gesellschaft) gained a concession to build a railway from Düren via Euskirchen, Kall to Schleiden in 1856, which it began to build in 1864. The Prussian government ordered that this line be extended from Kall to Trier for military reasons. The section of this route between Euskirchen and Trier became part of the Eifel Railway, which was opened between Gerolstein and Trier on 15 June 1871. This completed the line that later became the Trier West Railway.

The construction of the Moselle Line between Koblenz and Trier, opened on 15 May 1879, led to the Eifel Railway losing most of its passenger traffic. This ran from Ehrang over the Moselle near Pfalzel to the new Trier Central Station (Hauptbahnhof) and then on to Konz-Karthaus, where it connected to lines to Saarbrücken, Metz and Luxembourg.

The last part of the Trier West Railway, the Ehrang–Biewer freight line, was opened to traffic on 1 October 1925. It was built in the course of the construction of the now-defunct Ehrang marshalling yard and the associated Ehrang locomotive workshop. Biewer station was built on the track running towards Ehrang on an overpass crossing over a double-track freight line.

In the Second World War the line was damaged only a little in two places and was re-opened to traffic by the end of 1945.

After the war, the overpass at Biewer on the Biewer–Ehrang passenger line was removed and was replaced by a diamond crossing. In 1966, 13 pairs of local services ran between Igel and Trier-West, of which only four continued to Ehrang. Pallien and Biewer were no longer served from 1966. Passenger traffic began to decline in the early 1970s. First, passenger services were discontinued late in the evening and on weekends and were replaced by Deutsche Bundesbahn buses. The remaining trains were increasingly "in competition" with buses running parallel to the railway line, which eventually led to an increasing reduction in the number of the train services. In 1983, passenger services were discontinued after two years of services of only one train each day, the so-called "alibi train". In 1983, about 40 freight trains ran on the track each working day. After the end of the passenger traffic in 1983, the Ehrang–Biewer passenger tracks were dismantled and the protection of the Mäusheckerweg level crossing was reduced to a half barrier with a flashing light.

In the late 1980s, an increasing shift of freight trains to the main line on the right (east) side of the Moselle began, which meant that the line was only still for some hours each day.

In the 1990s, the line was only used for traffic running to the Euren industrial area. As a result, part of the line from the branch to the Euren industrial area via Zewen towards Igel had no scheduled trains. It was intended to reduce the line to one track and to remove the overhead line. The remaining line would have been operated only as a connection to the industrial area. Therefore, DB applied for permission to close the Trier West Railway completely. The closure was approved on 14 November 1997, but never completed. In the late 1990s, the foundations of the former passenger track in Ehrang and Biewer were removed and the line was reopened for the passage of freight.

Since then the line was used several times an hour for freight. The trains run between Ehrang and Wasserbillig and between Saarbrücken and Apach. The railway to the Euren/Zewen industrial area is served from Monday to Friday at noon by a freight exchange train (Übergabegüterzug), which runs regularly from Ehrang via Trier-West and Euren. Additional services, such as wine deliveries to Schloss Wachenheim, operated as required. In addition, the Trier West Railway serves as an alternative route for freight, depending on the workload through Trier Hauptbahnhof.

After the general decision was taken in the 2010s to reopen the line, the line was refurbished and five new stations were built from 2023 to 2025. New train stations were built in Trier-Hafenstraße and Trier-Pallien, whereas the old stops at Trier-West, Trier-Euren and Trier-Zewen were completely rebuilt. Additionally a second platform was built at Kreuz Konz Station. The line is serviced by two lines, RB 83 from Wittlich to Luxembourg and RB 84 from Saarburg via Konz to Hafenstraße.

== Route ==
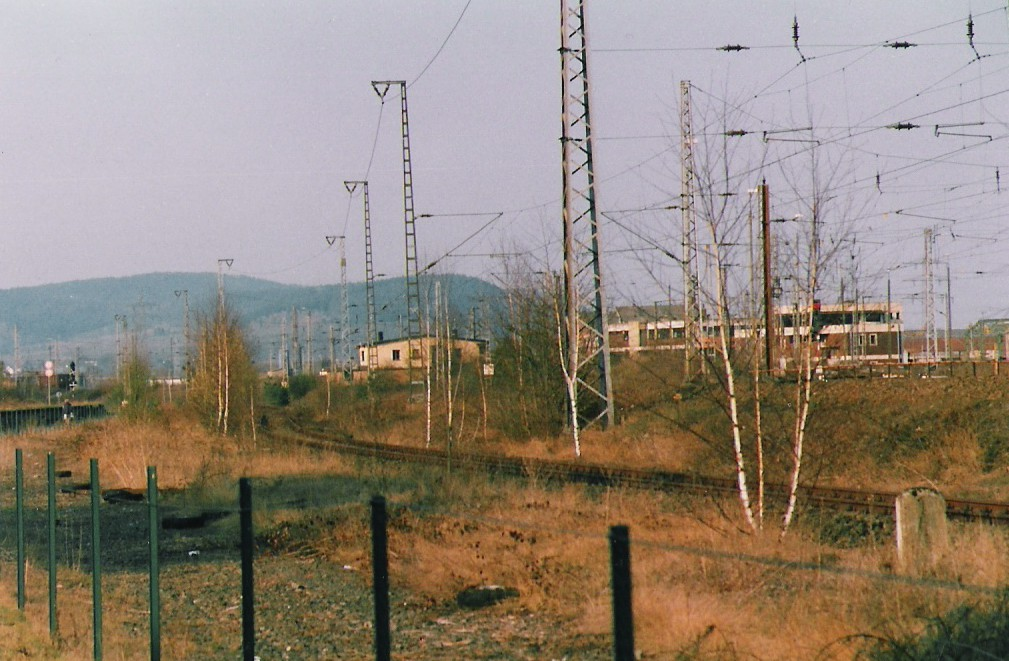
Closed section between Trier-Ehrang and Trier-Biewer

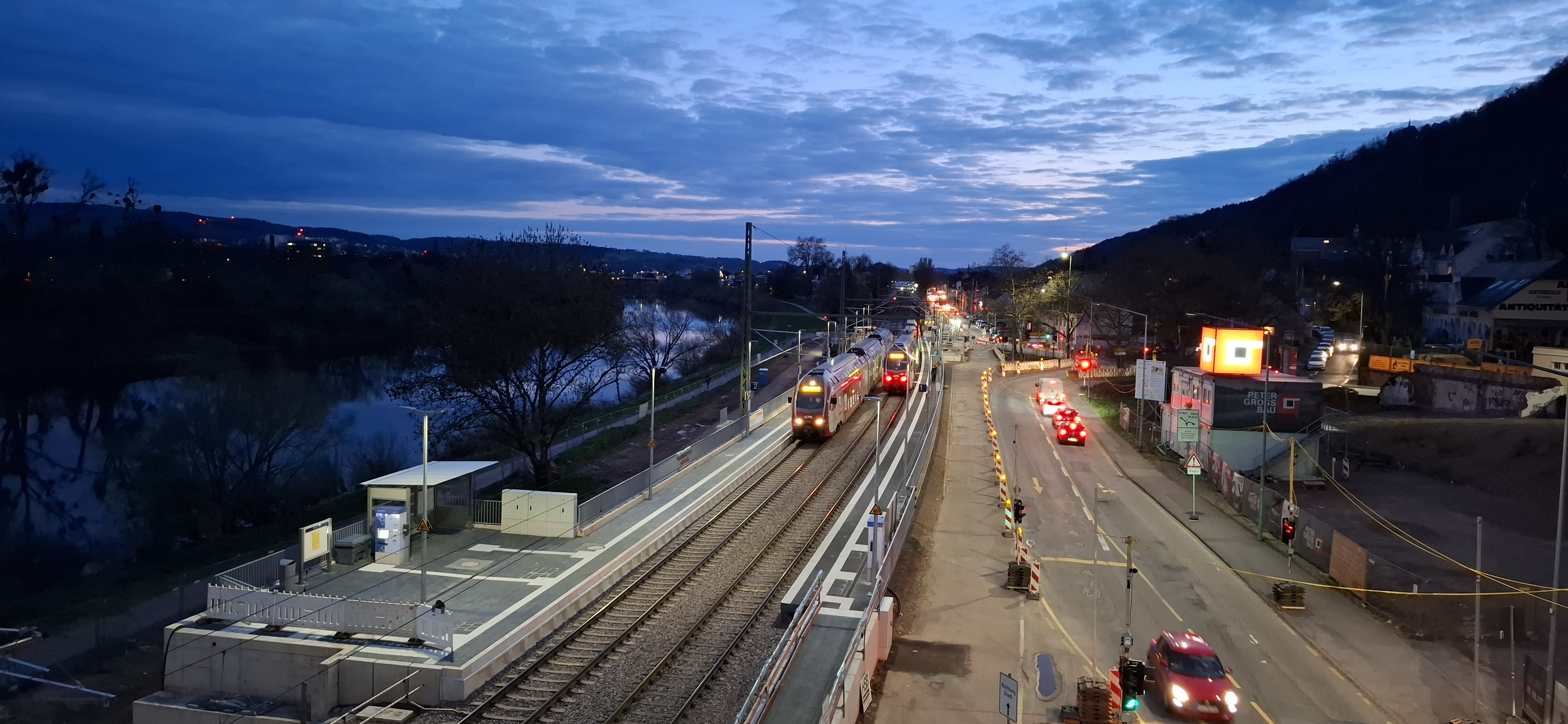
Two CFL Class 2300 EMUs at Trier-Pallien

The 14 km-long Trier West Railway began at Ehrang station and reached Biewer at the 3.1 km point. This section is no longer passable. Today Biewer is reached from Ehrang freight yard over the Ehrang–Biewer freight line. The line runs along the left bank of the Moselle to the former Pallien station (5.8 km), past sandstone cliffs, which are up to 80 m high, on the sides of the Joster and Fichten mountains. Then the Moselle valley widens again and the line runs through Trier-West (7.7 km), Euren (9.6 km) to Zewen (12.6 km).

Until the late 1990s, there was still a siding of the French army between Trier West and Euren. Between Euren and Zewen, an industrial track branches off to the industrial district of Trier–Euren. It is about 2.5 km long and was used primarily to connect to Japan Tobacco International and the champagne manufacturer, Schloss Wachenheim.

The line is up to 1.5 km from the Mosel at Zewen but only 200 metres away at Igel. The line continues on the north bank (left bank of the Moselle), the route continues to Igel-Wasserbillig, where, after crossing the Luxembourg border on the bridge over the Sauer at Wasserbilligerbrück, the line connects with the Luxemburg–Wasserbillig railway, which connects with Luxembourg railway station. At Igel, the line branches over the Moselle bridge to Konz, where it connects with lines to Karthaus and Trier Hauptbahnhof, to Konz and Saarbrücken and to Oberbillig and Metz.

The Trier West Railway formerly also connected with the Nims-Sauer Valley Railway (Nims-Sauertalbahn), running from Bitburg-Erdorf via Bitburg and Irrel to Igel, where it connected to Trier-West. The junction with the Sauer valley line was near the Löwener Mühle hotel ("Igel-West," between Wasserbillig and Igel) until it was dismantled in the late 1960s.

At a meeting of transport ministers Claude Wiseler and Peter Ramsauer on 7 October 2011, it was announced that the line between Igel station and Igel-West would be duplicated again at a cost of €19.6 million. €8 million of this would be provided by the Grand Duchy of Luxembourg. The bridge where federal highway 49 crosses the line on the outskirts on Igel towards Luxembourg and Löwener Mühle, is to be demolished in the spring of 2013 and replaced. The development of this 1.8 km long bottleneck is to be completed by 2015. It allowed an increase in the maximum speed to 90 km/h and an hourly service between Trier and Luxembourg.
