= Sandweiler-Contern railway station =

Railway station in Luxembourg

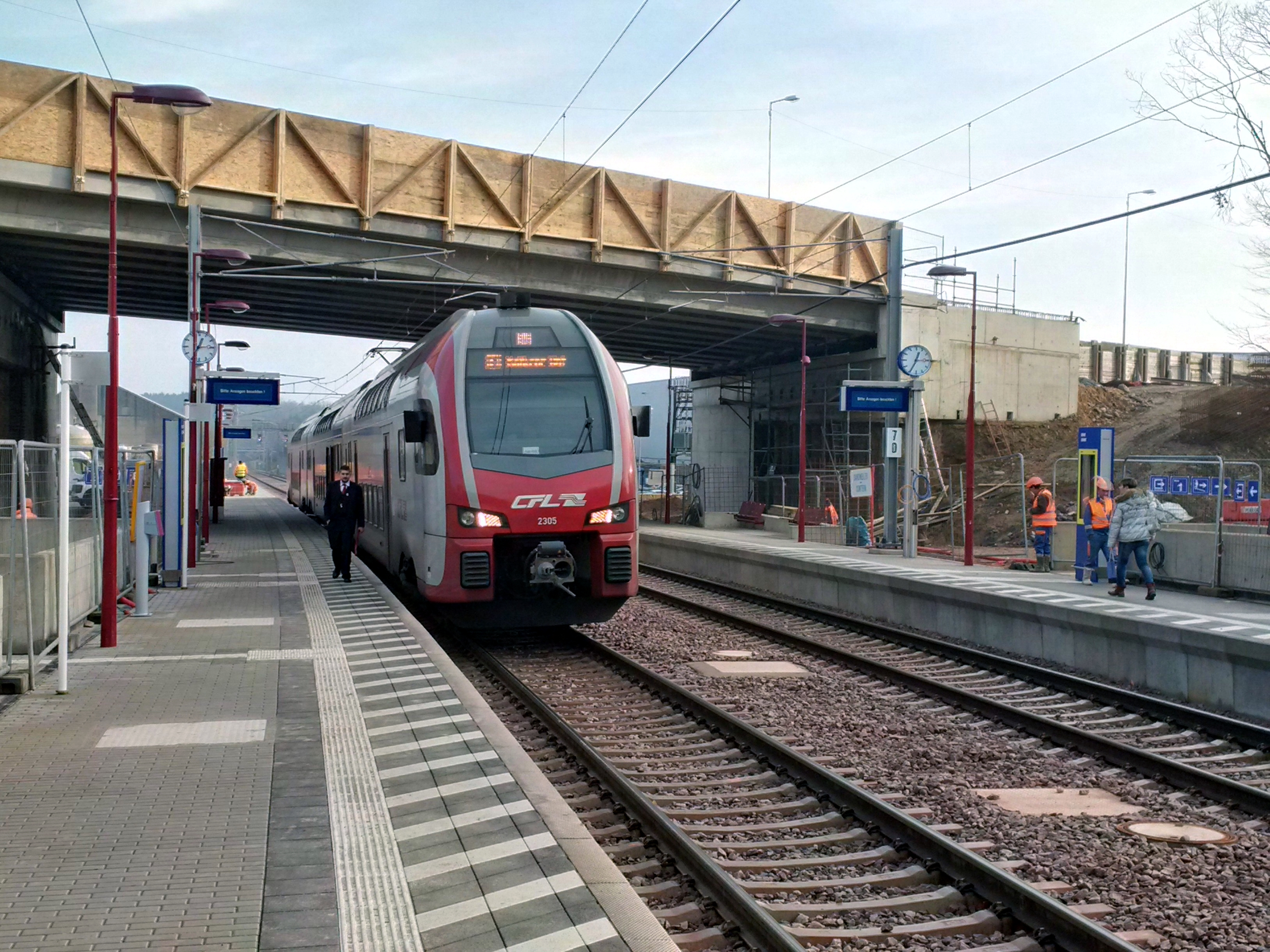
A CFL Class 2300 at the Westbound Platform of the new station

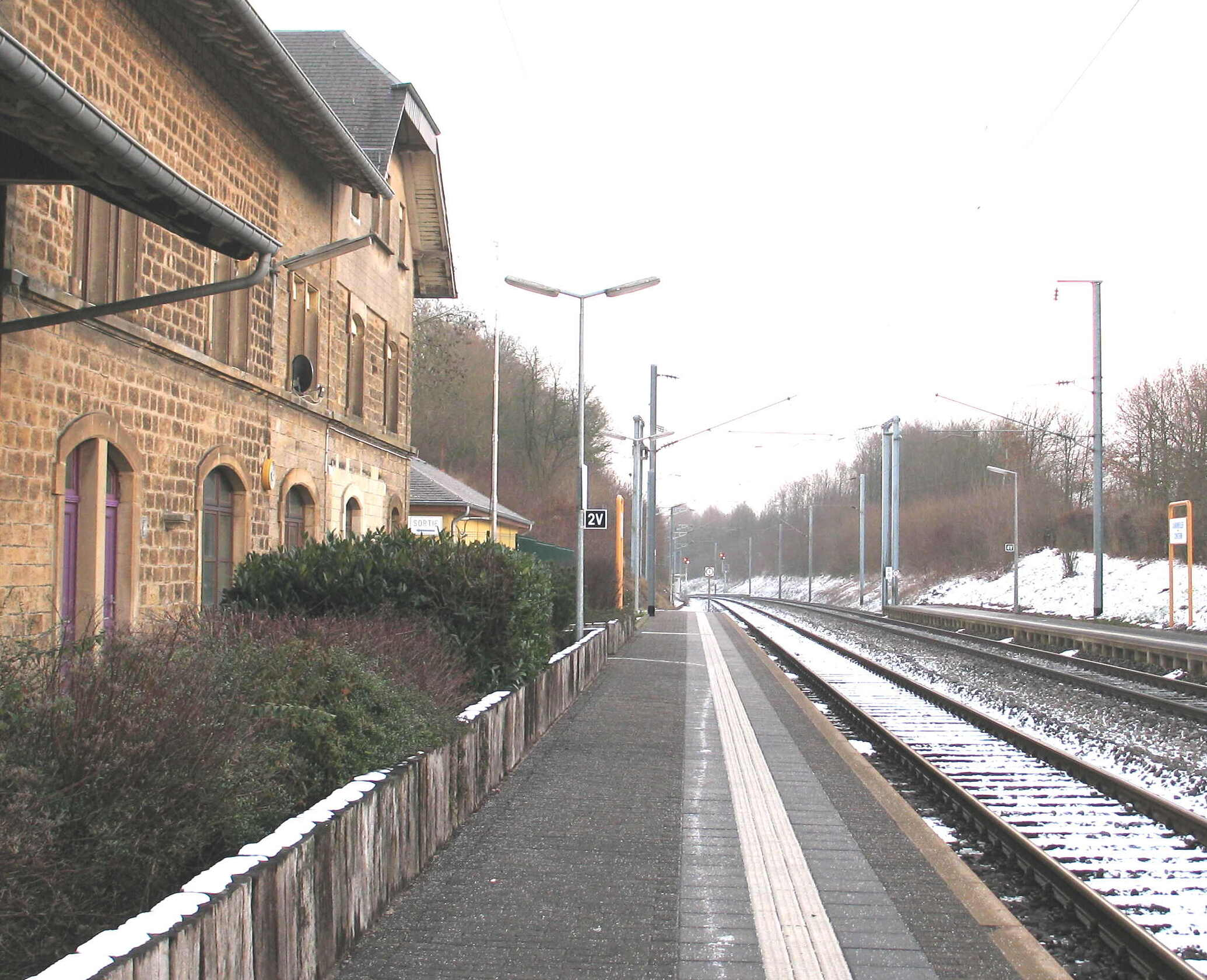
The Old Sandweiler-Contern Station

Sandweiler-Contern railway station (Luxembourgish: Gare Sandweiler-Conter, French: Gare de Sandweiler-Contern, German: Bahnhof Sandweiler-Contern) is a railway station serving the towns of Contern and Sandweiler, in southern Luxembourg. It is operated by Chemins de Fer Luxembourgeois, the state-owned railway company.

The Railway station was in the commune of Hesperange but in the December 2015 the station was rebuilt closer to the main road connecting Contern and Sandweiler and the Industrial zone between them where the station is located. The new station is in the commune of contern but within a few hundred metres from the border with both the communes of Hesperange and Sandweiler and the old station.

The Old Station building and one of the platforms are still visible from beside the railways line.

The station is situated on Line 30, which connects Luxembourg City to the east of the country and Trier.

It gets Local services to Wittlich and faster services to Trier/Koblenz.

Preceding station	CFL	Following station
Cents-Hamm towards Luxembourg	Line 30	Oetrange towards Trier Hbf
