= 2300 class =

2300 class or Class 2300 may refer to:

- CFL Class 2300, electric multiple units
- Illinois Central 2300 Class, 4-8-2 steam locomotives
- Queensland Railways 2300 class, diesel-electric locomotives
- South Australian Railways Redhen railcar#2300/2500 class ("Superchook") variant
