= Roodt railway station =

Railway station in Luxembourg

Coordinates: 49°40′01″N 06°18′12″E

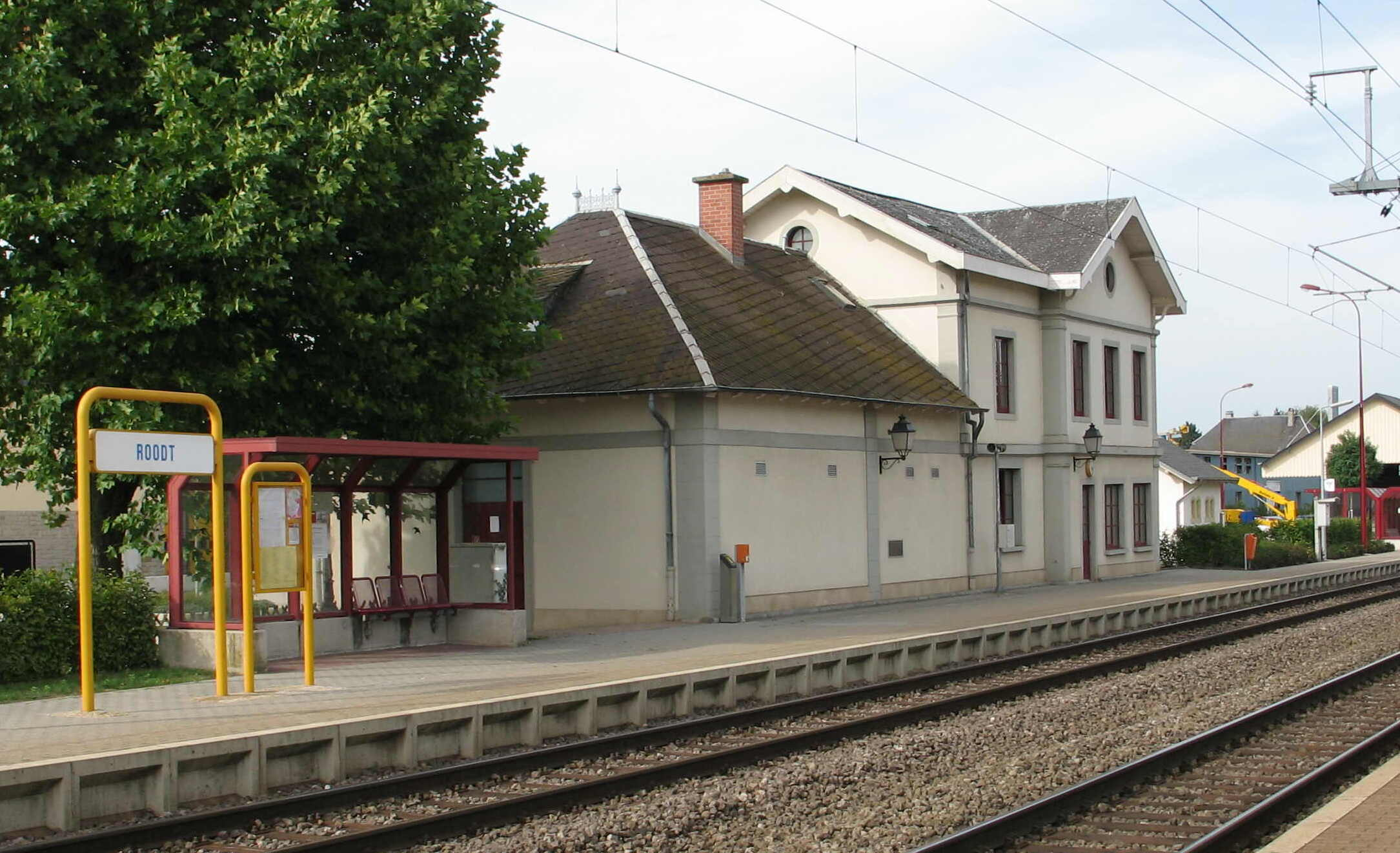
The station in 2006.

Roodt railway station (Luxembourgish: Gare Rued, French: Gare de Roodt, German: Bahnhof Roodt) is a railway station serving Roodt-sur-Syre, in the commune of Betzdorf, in eastern Luxembourg. It is operated by Société Nationale des Chemins de Fer Luxembourgeois, the state-owned railway company.

The station is situated on Line 30, which connects Luxembourg City to the east of the country and Trier.

Preceding station	CFL	Following station
Munsbach towards Luxembourg	Line 30	Betzdorf towards Trier Hbf
