= Mertert railway station =

Railway station in Luxembourg

Coordinates: 49°42′11″N 06°28′45″E

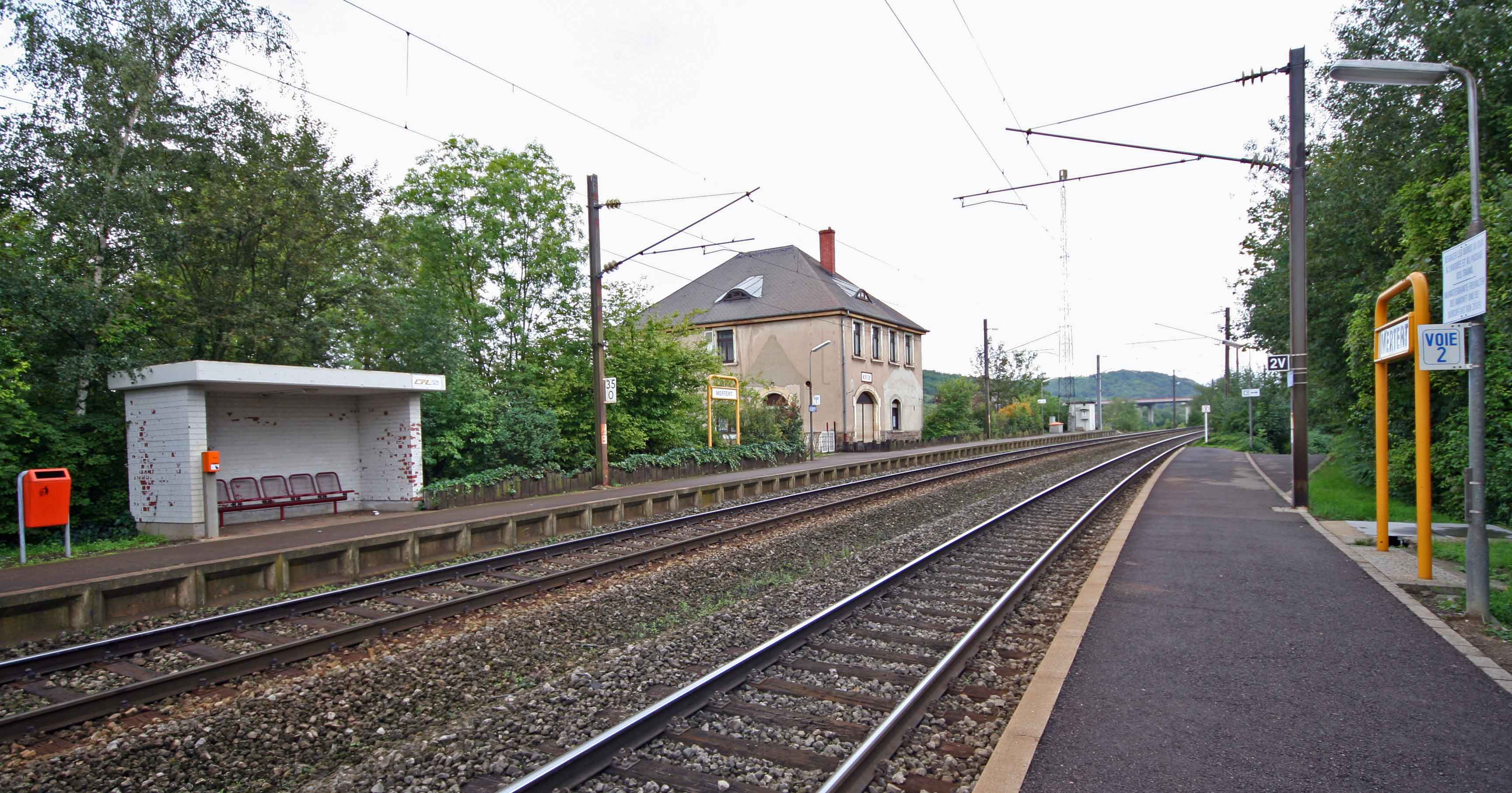
Mertert railway

Mertert railway station (Luxembourgish: Gare Mäertert, French: Gare de Mertert, German: Bahnhof Mertert) is a railway station serving Mertert, in eastern Luxembourg. It is operated by Chemins de Fer Luxembourgeois, the state-owned railway company.

The station is situated on Line 30, which connects Luxembourg City to the east of the country and Trier.

Preceding station	CFL	Following station
Manternach towards Luxembourg	Line 30	Wasserbillig towards Trier Hbf
