= Oetrange railway station =

Railway station in Luxembourg

Coordinates: 49°36′01″N 06°15′28″E

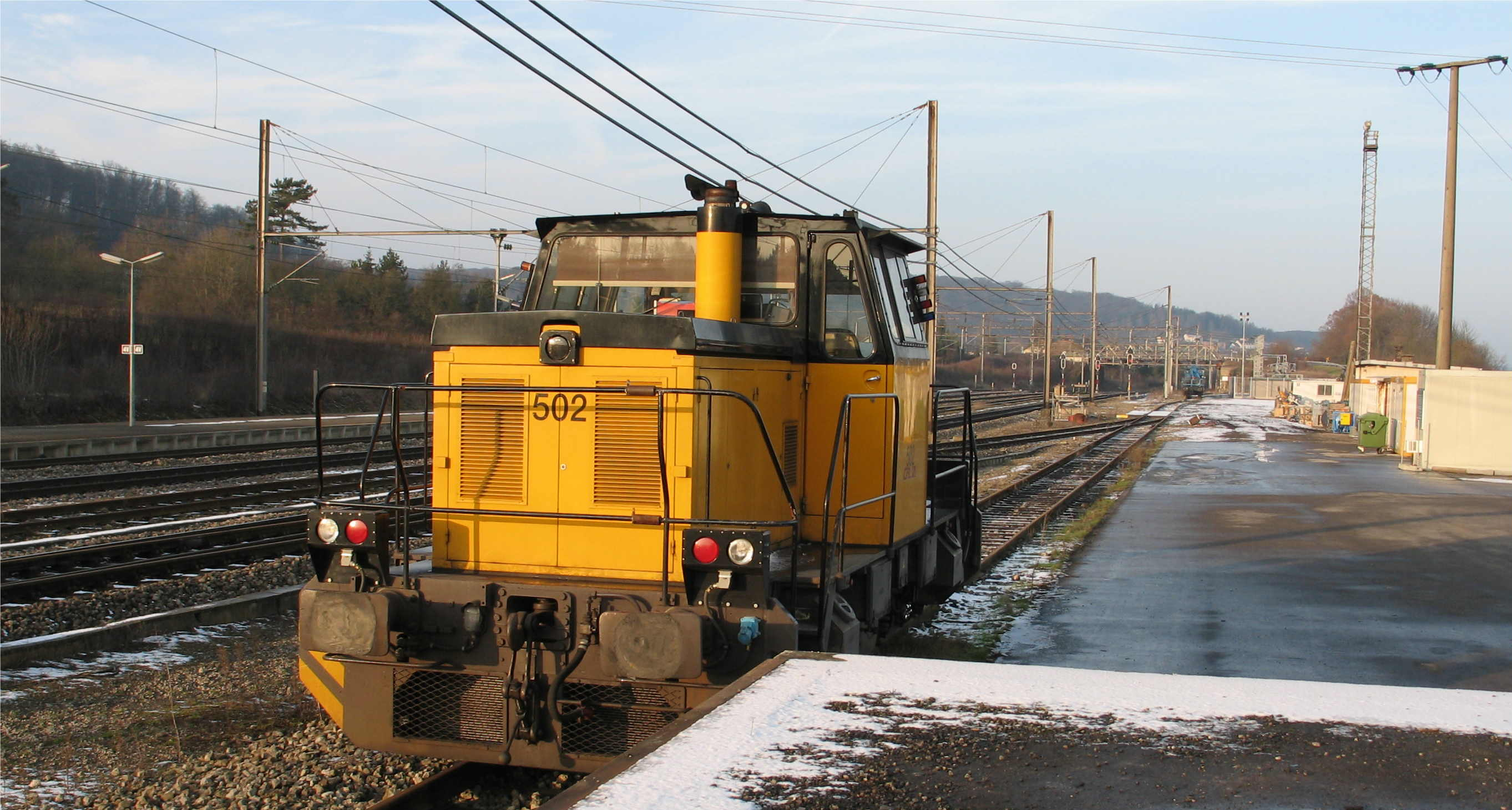
Oetrange railway

Oetrange railway station (Luxembourgish: Gare Éiter, French: Gare de Oetrange, German: Bahnhof Oetringen) is a railway station serving Oetrange, in the commune of Contern, in southern Luxembourg. It is operated by Chemins de Fer Luxembourgeois, the state-owned railway company.

The station is situated on Line 30, which connects Luxembourg City to the east of the country and Trier.

Preceding station	CFL	Following station
Sandweiler-Contern towards Luxembourg	Line 30	Munsbach towards Trier Hbf
