= Manternach railway station =

Railway station in Luxembourg

Coordinates: 49°42′23″N 06°25′24″E

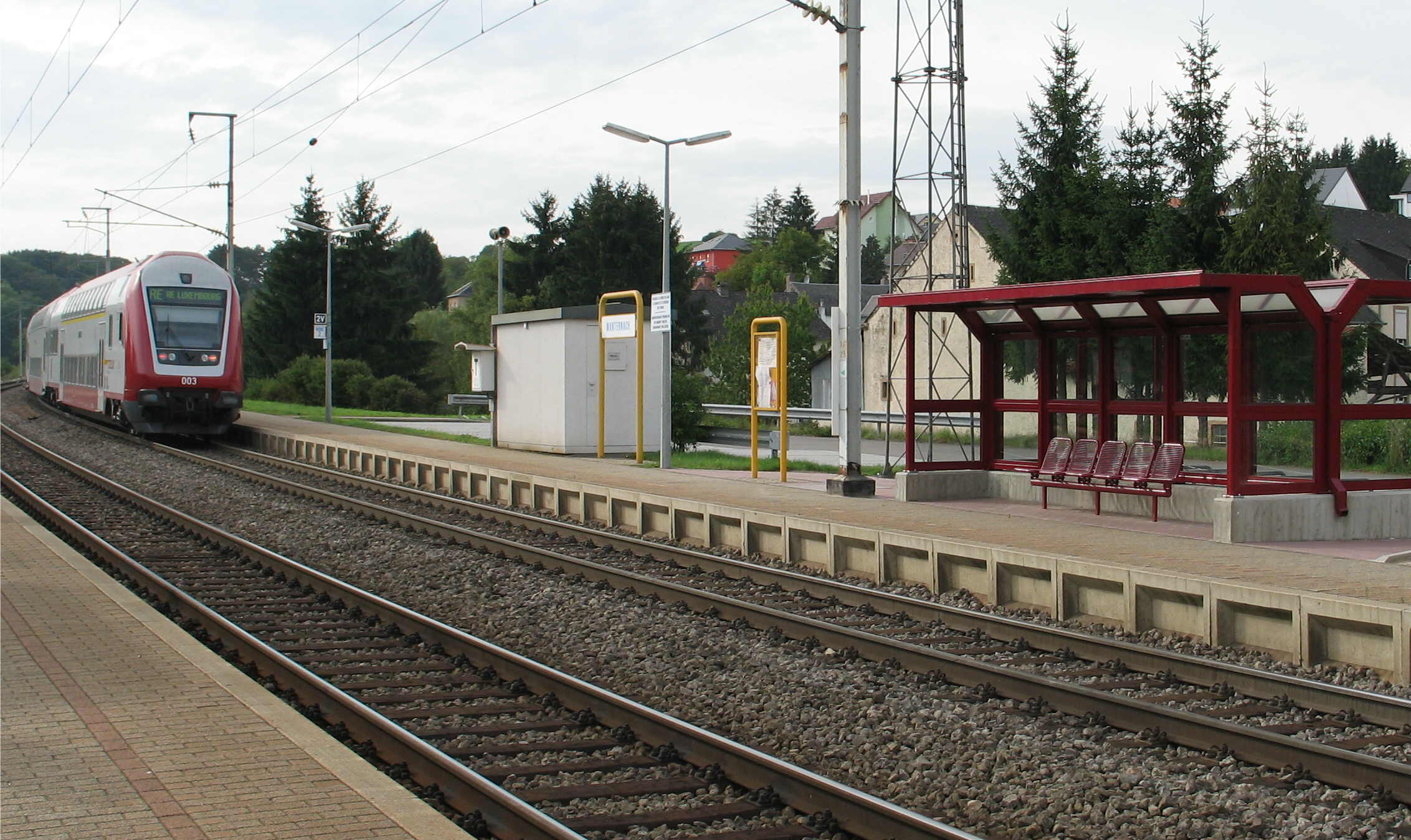
GarManter14.

Manternach railway station (Luxembourgish: Gare Manternach, French: Gare de Manternach, German: Bahnhof Manternach) is a railway station serving Manternach, in eastern Luxembourg. It is operated by Chemins de Fer Luxembourgeois, the state-owned railway company. It was built by the French company Direction générale impériale des chemins de fer d'Alsace-Lorraine in 1899, and operated by Société royale grand-ducale des chemins de fer Guillaume-Luxembourg.

The station is situated on Line 30, which connects Luxembourg City to the east of the country and Trier. You can hear 27 loud beeps every time a train comes when the barriers go down.

Preceding station	CFL	Following station
Wecker towards Luxembourg	Line 30	Mertert towards Trier Hbf
