= Betzdorf railway station =

Railway station in Luxembourg

Coordinates: 49°41′20″N 06°20′56″E

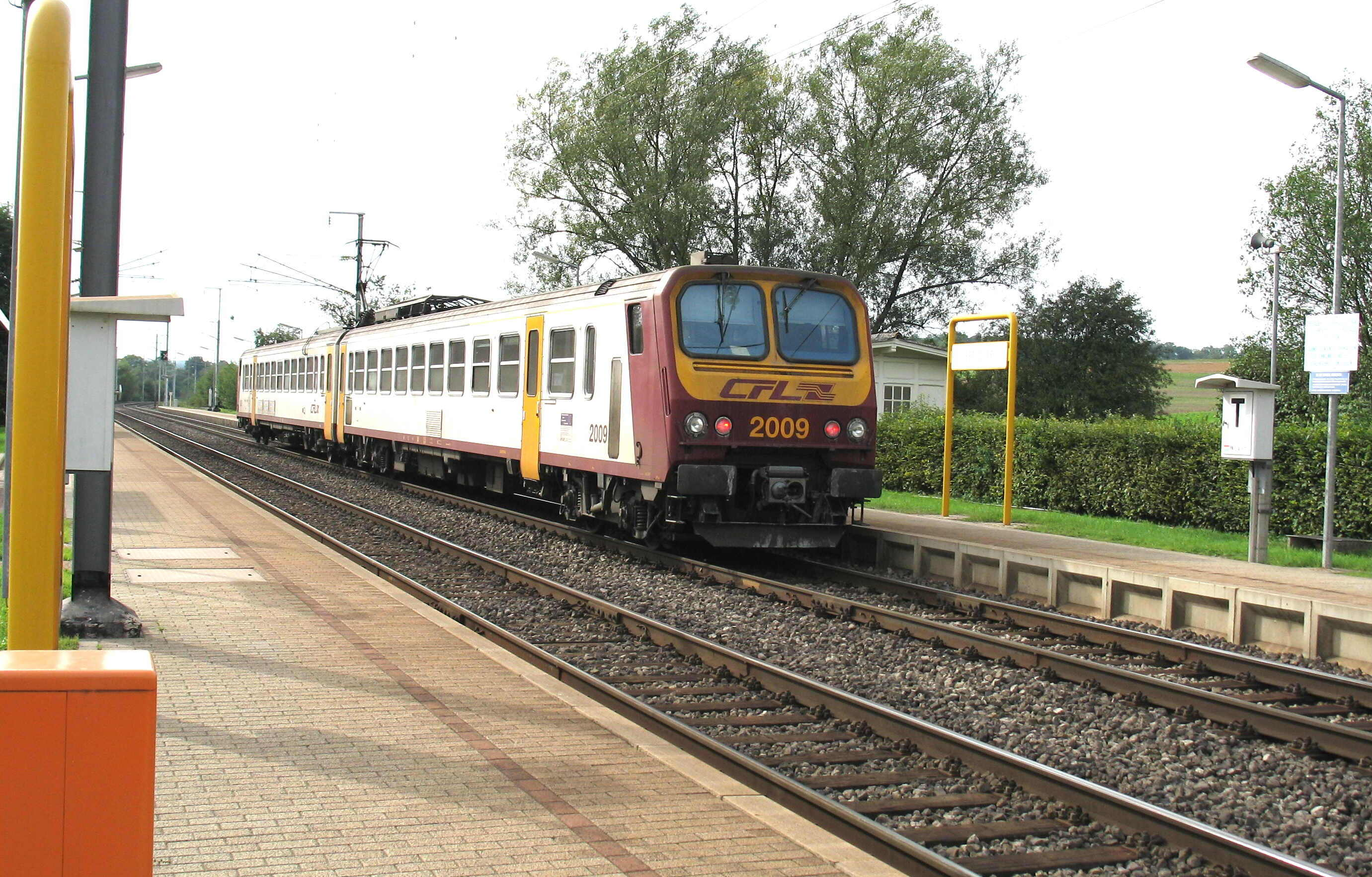
Train station of Betzdorf

Betzdorf railway station (Luxembourgish: Gare Betzder, French: Gare de Betzdorf, German: Bahnhof Betzdorf) is a railway station serving Betzdorf, in eastern Luxembourg. It is operated by Chemins de Fer Luxembourgeois, the state-owned railway company.

The station is situated on Line 30, which connects Luxembourg City to the east of the country and Trier.

Preceding station	CFL	Following station
Roodt towards Luxembourg	Line 30	Wecker towards Trier Hbf
