= Wecker railway station =

Railway station in Luxembourg

Coordinates: 49°41′59″N 06°23′10″E

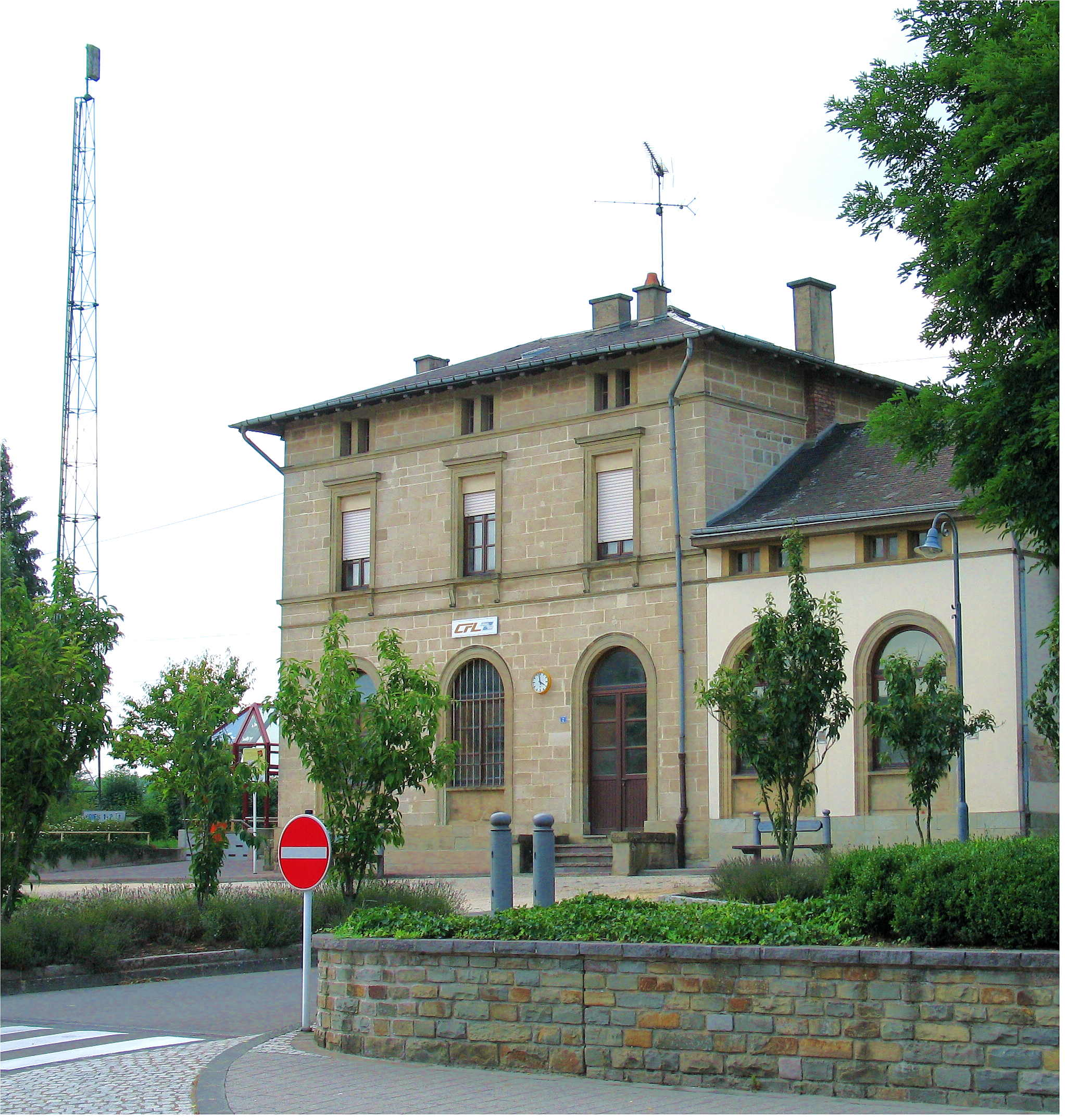
Wecker Station

Wecker railway station (Luxembourgish: Gare Wecker, French: Gare de Wecker, German: Bahnhof Wecker) is a railway station serving Wecker, in the commune of Biwer, in eastern Luxembourg. It is operated by Chemins de Fer Luxembourgeois, the state-owned railway company.

The station is situated on Line 30, which connects Luxembourg City to the east of the country and Trier.

Preceding station	CFL	Following station
Betzdorf towards Luxembourg	Line 30	Manternach towards Trier Hbf
