= Munschecker =

Village

Coordinates: 49.69917°N 6.44216°E

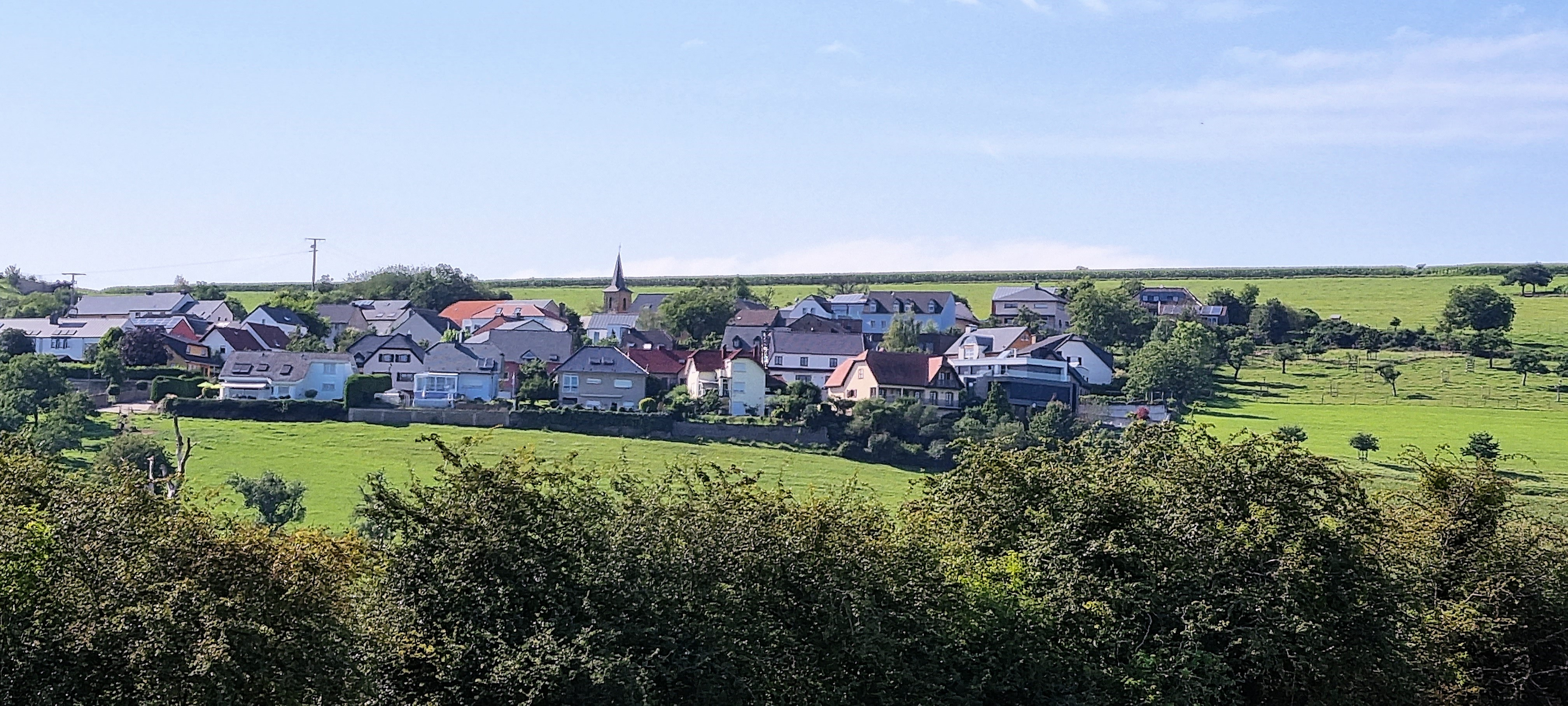
Manternach, Münschecker

Münschecker (Luxembourgish: Mënjecker) is a village in the commune of Manternach, in eastern Luxembourg. As of September 2026, the village has a population of 231.
