= Munsbach railway station =

Railway station in Luxembourg

Coordinates: 49°37′50″N 06°16′05″E

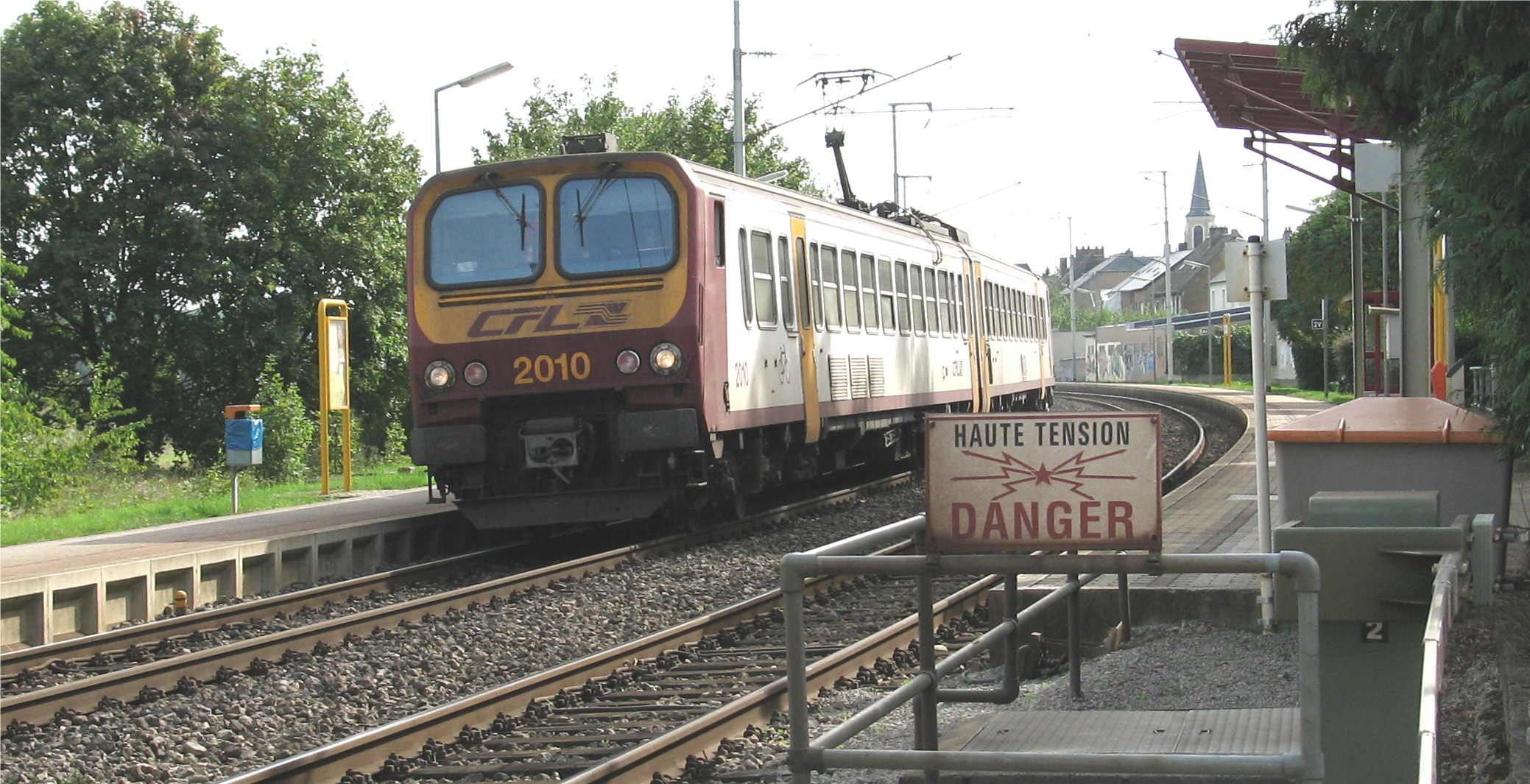
Mënsbechgare12

Munsbach railway station (Luxembourgish: Gare Minsbech, French: Gare de Munsbach, German: Bahnhof Munsbach) is a railway station serving Munsbach, in the commune of Schuttrange, in southern Luxembourg. It is operated by Chemins de Fer Luxembourgeois, the state-owned railway company.

The station is situated on Line 30, which connects Luxembourg City to the east of the country and Trier.

Preceding station	CFL	Following station
Oetrange towards Luxembourg	Line 30	Roodt towards Trier Hbf
