= Cents-Hamm railway station =

Railway station in Luxembourg

Coordinates: 49°36′52″N 06°09′51″E

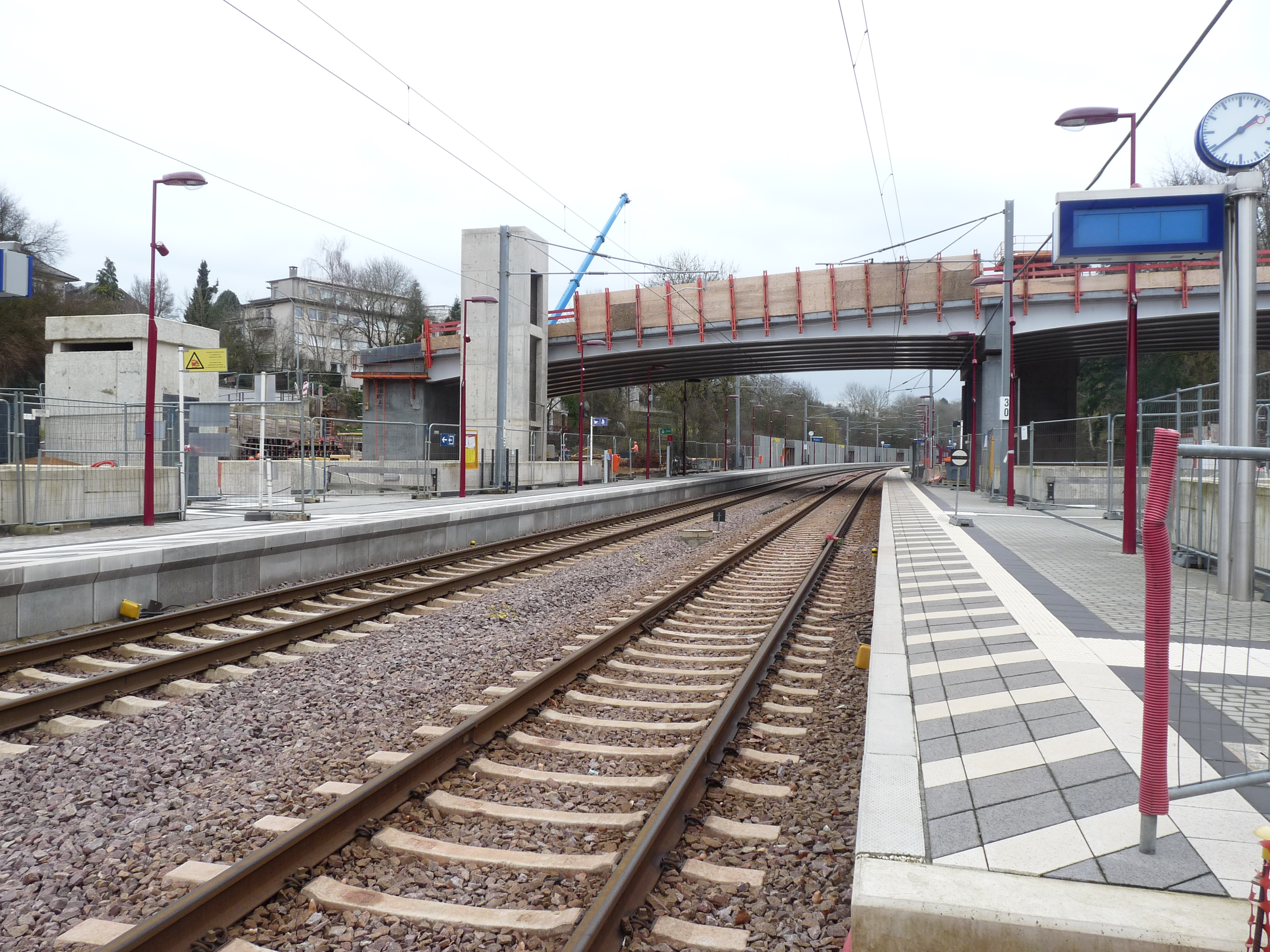
Cents-Hamm station

Cents-Hamm railway station (Luxembourgish: Gare Zens-Hamm, French: Gare de Cents-Hamm, German: Bahnhof Cents-Hamm) is a railway station serving the districts of Cents and Hamm in the east of Luxembourg City, in southern Luxembourg. It is operated by Chemins de Fer Luxembourgeois, the state-owned railway company.

The station is situated on Line 30, which connects Luxembourg City to the east of the country and Trier. It is the first stop east out of Luxembourg station, which is located on the other side of the Alzette valley.

Preceding station	CFL	Following station
Luxembourg Terminus	Line 30	Sandweiler-Contern towards Trier Hbf
