= Lellig =

Village in Luxembourg

Coordinates: 49°43′15″N 6°26′06″E

Lellig (German pronunciation: [ˈlɛlɪç]; Luxembourgish: Lelleg) is a village in the commune of Manternach, in eastern Luxembourg. As of September 2026, the village had a population of 268.
