= Wasserbillig railway station =

Railway station in Luxembourg

Coordinates: 49°42′45″N 06°29′55″E

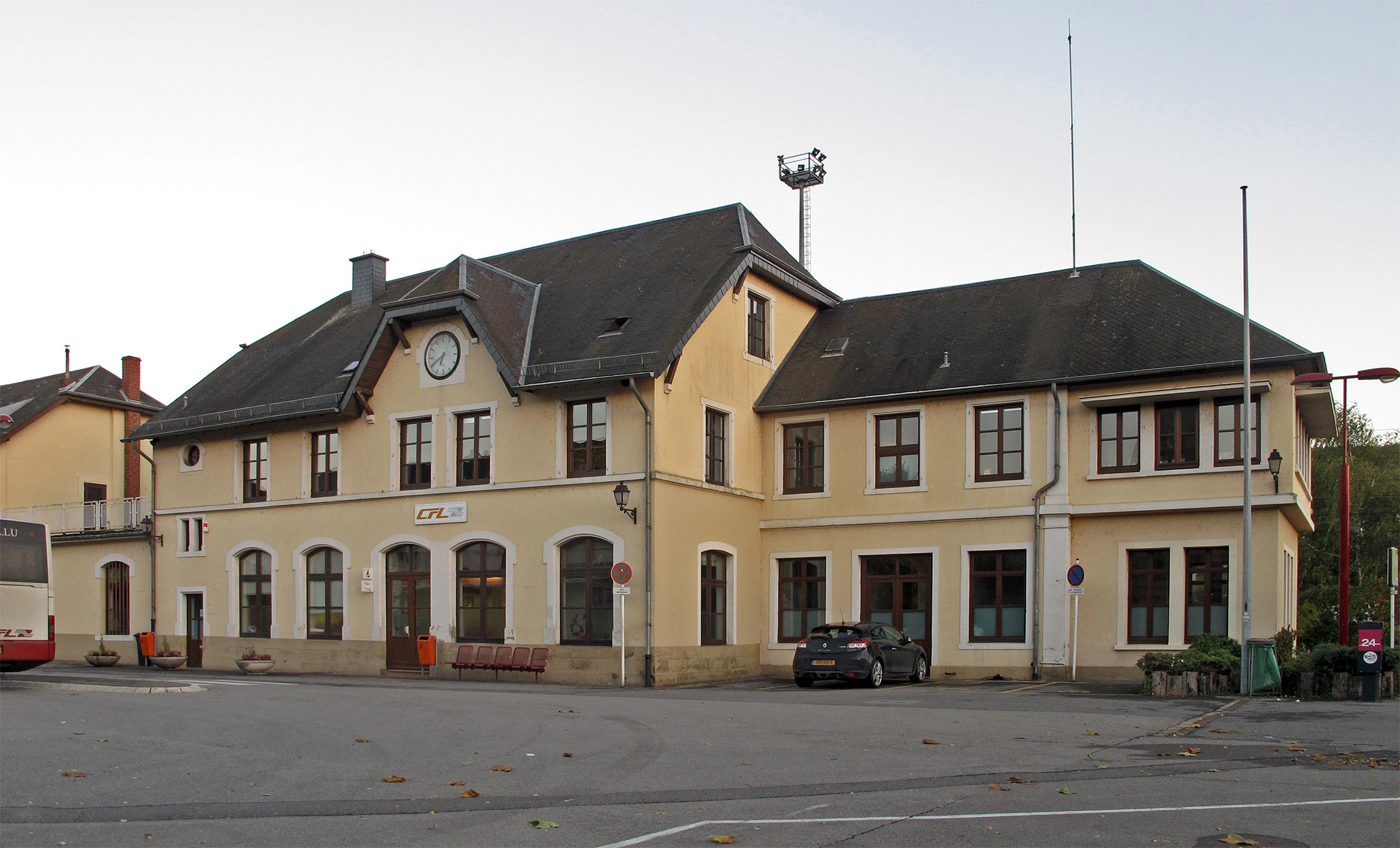
The station in 2012.

Wasserbillig railway station (Luxembourgish: Gare Waasserbëlleg, French: Gare de Wasserbillig, German: Bahnhof Wasserbillig) is a railway station serving Wasserbillig, in the commune of Mertert, in eastern Luxembourg. It is operated by Chemins de Fer Luxembourgeois, the state-owned railway company.

The station is situated on Line 30, which connects Luxembourg City to the east of the country and Trier.

Preceding station	CFL	Following station
Mertert towards Luxembourg	Line 30	Igel towards Trier Hbf
