= CFL Class 2300 =

Luxembourgish electric multiple units

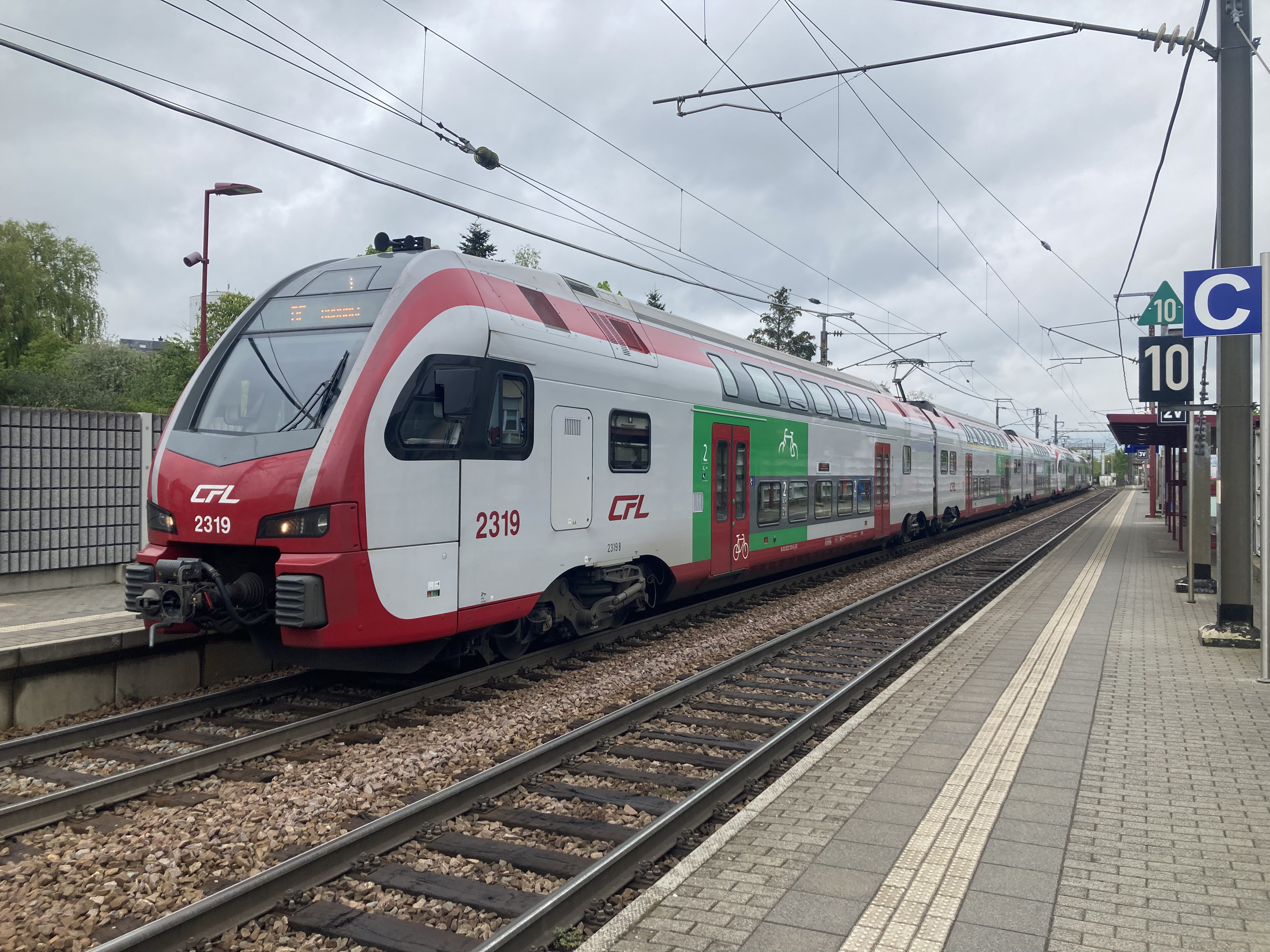
- 2319 in 2025

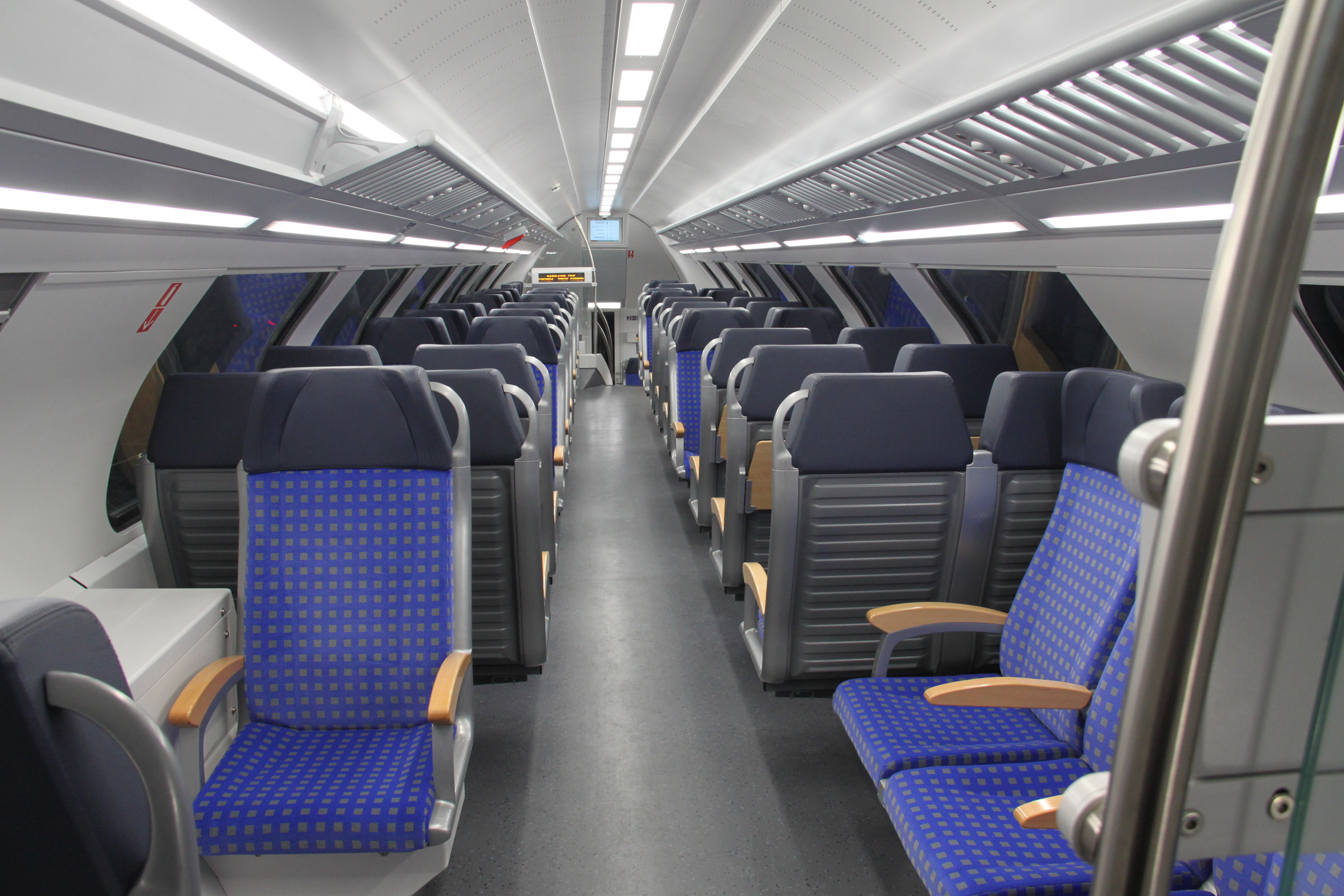
- Second class upper deck interior
- In service: 2014 - Present
- Manufacturer: Stadler Rail
- Family name: Stadler KISS
- Constructed: 2013
- Number built: 8 trainsets (24 vehicles)
- Number in service: 8
- Formation: ABD+B (DMBCO-DTSO)
- Capacity: 29 First 255 Standard
- Operator: CFL
- Line served: Luxembourg - Trier - Koblenz

Specifications
- Train length: 79.84 m (261 ft 11 5/16 in)
- Width: 2.80 m (9 ft 2 1/4 in)
- Height: 4.63 m (15 ft 2 5/16 in)
- Floor height: 440 mm (17 in) (lower deck 2,515 mm (99.0 in) (upper deck)
- Platform height: 580 mm (23 in)
- Doors: 12
- Articulated sections: 3
- Maximum speed: 160 km/h (99 mph)
- Weight: 170 t
- Power output: 3,000 kilowatts (4,000 hp)
- Electric system: 15 kV AC/25 kV AC overhead lines
- Current collection: pantograph
- UIC classification: 2‘Bo‘ + 2‘2‘ + Bo‘2‘
- Safety system: ETCS 1
- Track gauge: 1,435 mm (4 ft 8 1/2 in) standard gauge

CFL Class 2300 is a series of electric multiple units of the type Stadler KISS built by Stadler Rail for the Luxembourgish national railway company, CFL.

In 2010, CFL ordered 8 double-decker EMUs for 60 million euros for the Luxembourg – Koblenz line.

From 10 December 2018, CFL started to operate the Class 2300 on a once-a-day service each way between Luxembourg and Düsseldorf Hbf via the West Rhine Railway. Due to its speed, this service is classed as an InterCity (IC) service from Koblenz Hbf to Düsseldorf Hbf.

== Gallery ==
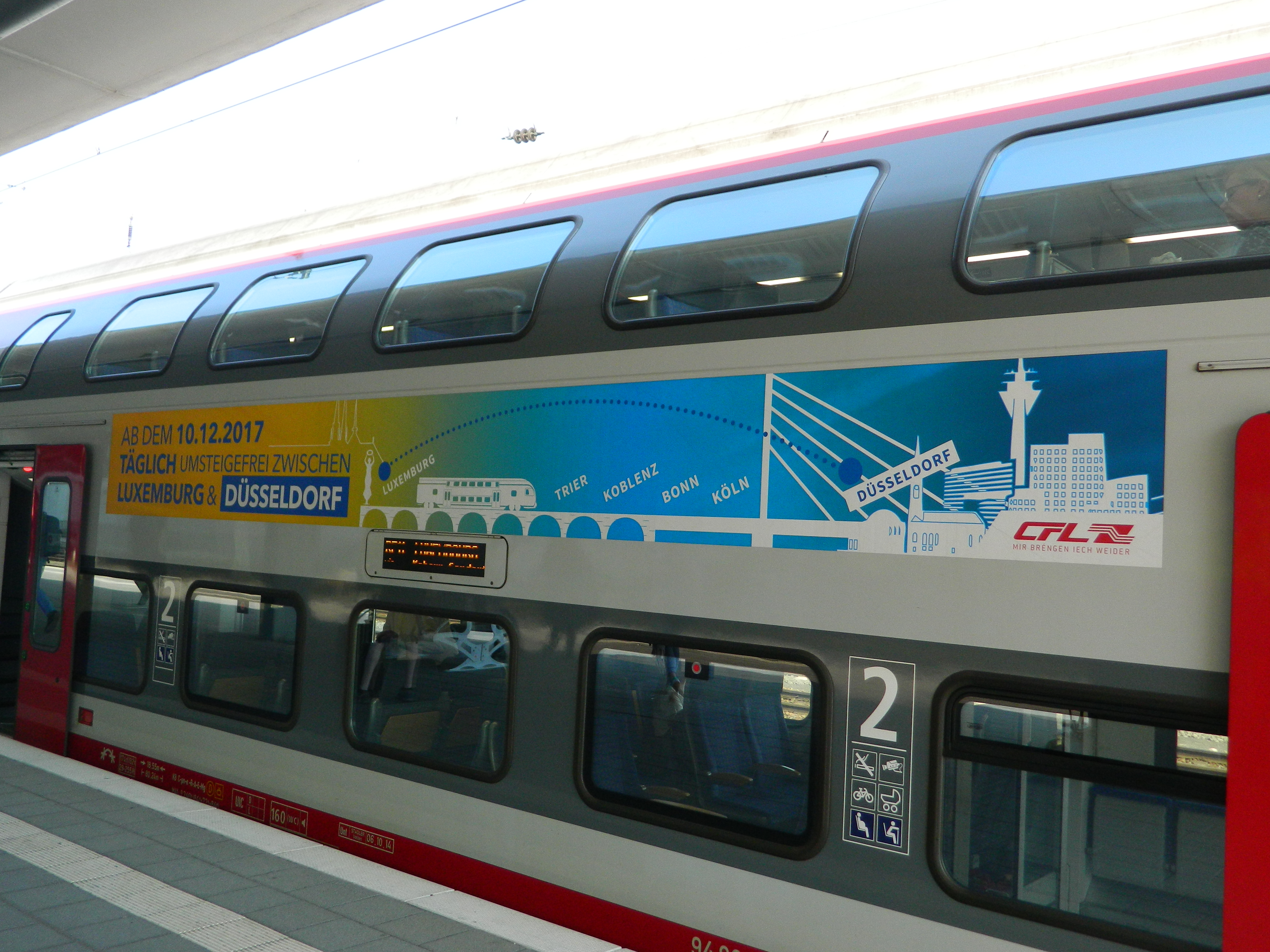
Advertising sticker

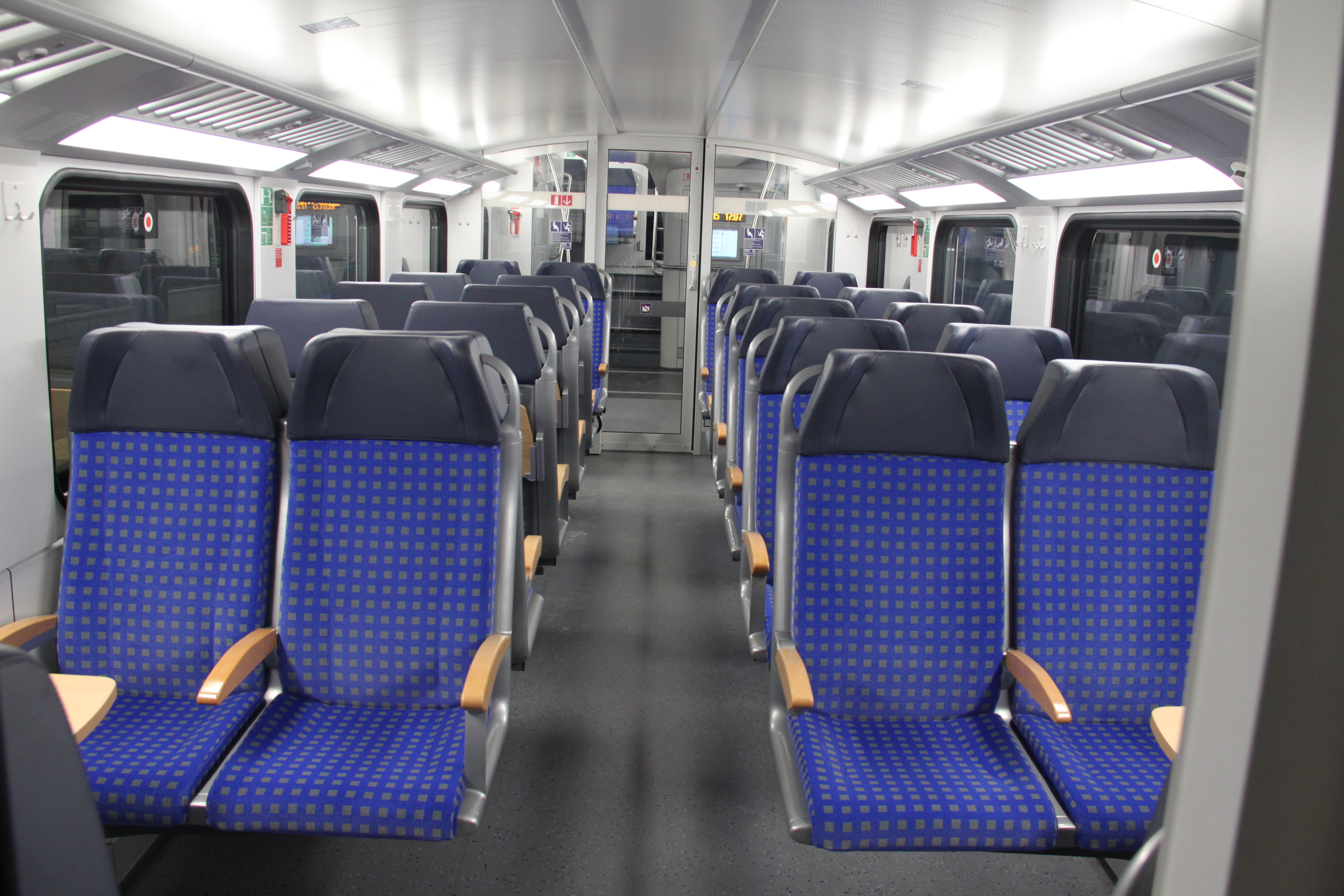
Second class, lower deck

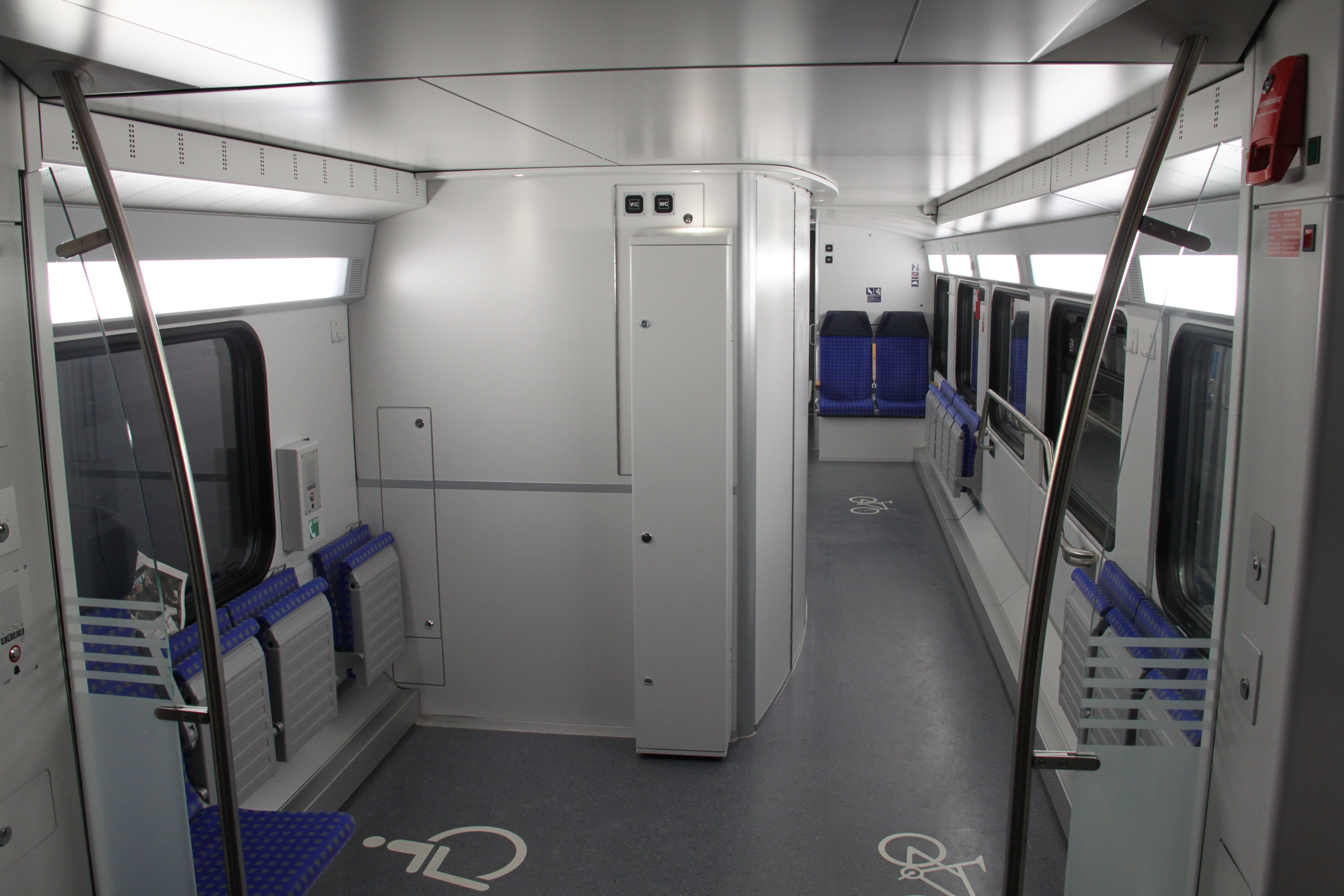
Multifunctional area, lower deck

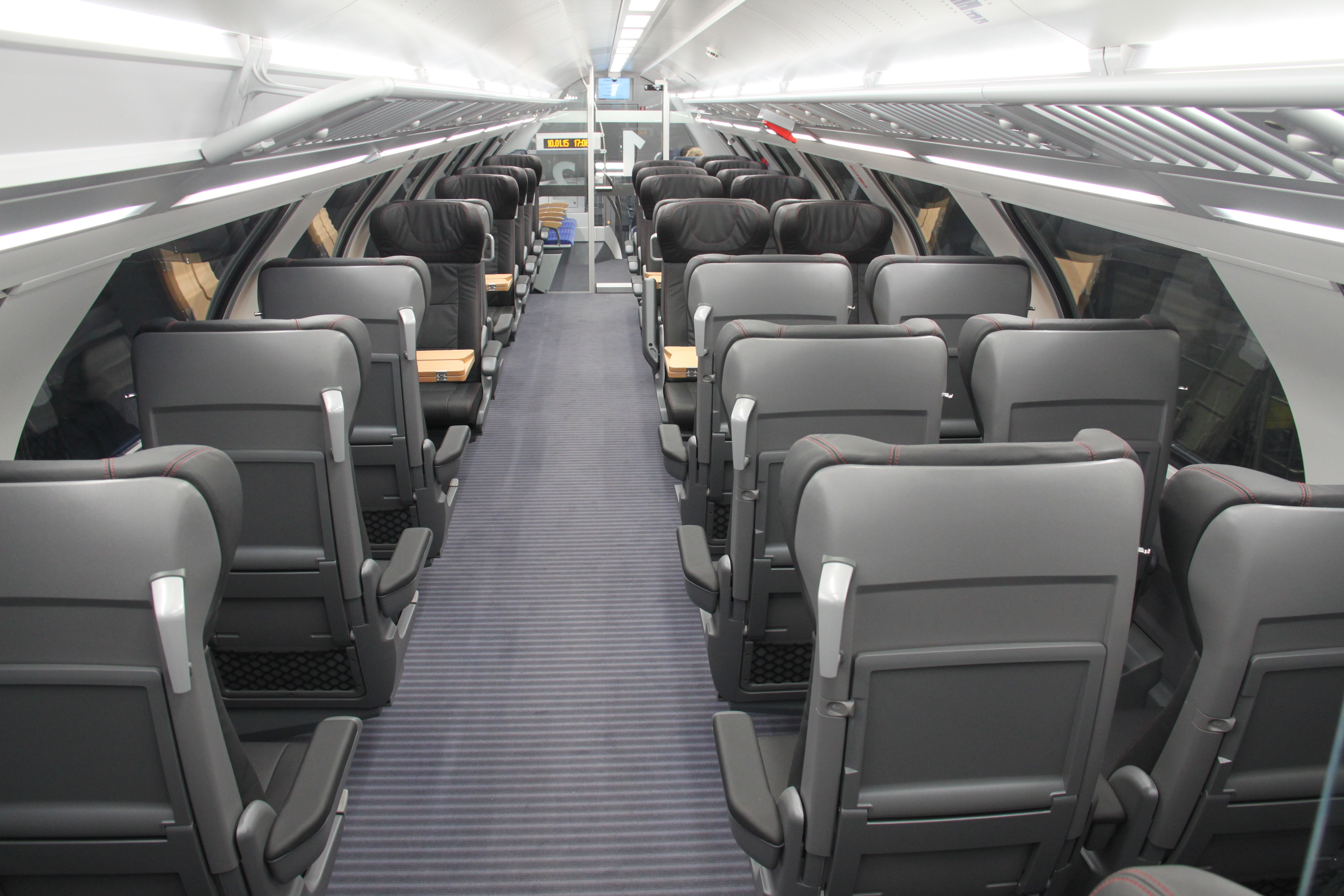
First class, upper deck

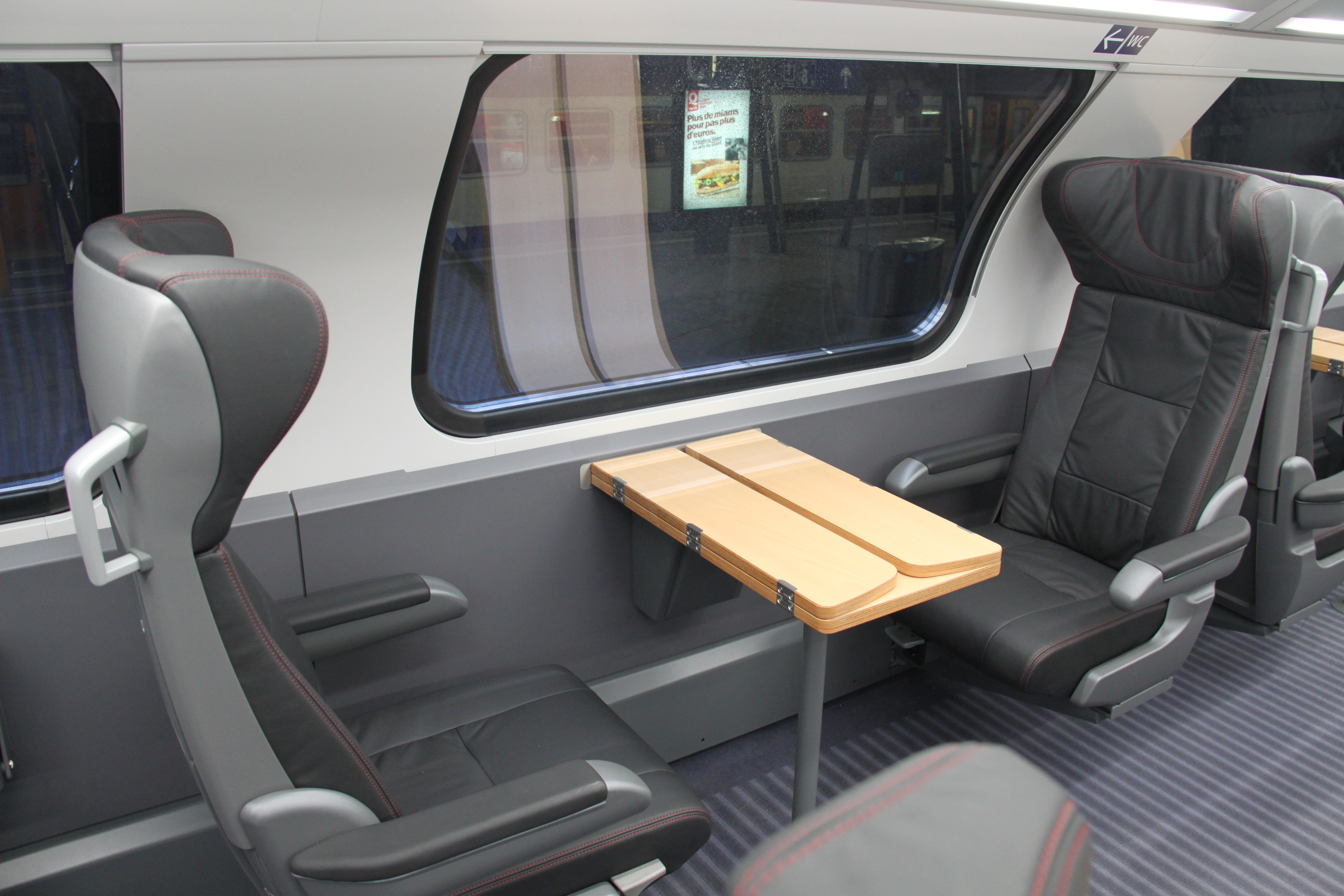
First class seats, upper deck
