= Munshausen =

Munshausen Munzen
- Former commune

- Coat of arms

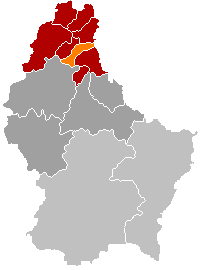
- Map of Luxembourg with Munshausen highlighted in orange, and the canton in dark red
- Coordinates: 50.0333°N 6.0375°E
- Country: Luxembourg
- Canton: Clervaux
- Time zone: UTC+1 (CET)
  - Summer (DST): UTC+2 (CEST)
- Website: munshausen.lu

Munshausen (German pronunciation: [mʊnsˈhaʊzn̩]; Luxembourgish: Munzen) is a village in northern Luxembourg, in the commune of Clervaux.

Munshausen was the seat of its own commune until it was merged with Clervaux in 2009.

As of September 2026, the village of Munshausen had a population of 277.

== Former commune ==
The former commune consisted of the villages:

- Drauffelt (Draufelt)
- Marnach (Maarnech)
- Munshausen (Munzen)
- Roder (Rueder)
- Siebenaler (Siwwenaler)

== Geography ==
Munshausen is situated in the northeastern part of Luxembourg. In the east, the river Our forms a natural boundary to Germany.

Munshausen is part of the Oesling, the Luxembourgish part of the Ardennes. The landscape is composed of free plateaus at an average altitude of 1650 ft, cut by several narrow riverbeds. The axis Hosingen-Heinerscheid, passing through Marnach, is the dividing line between the basins of the river Clerve in the west and the river Our in the east.
