= Heinerscheid =

Heinerscheid Hengescht
- Former commune
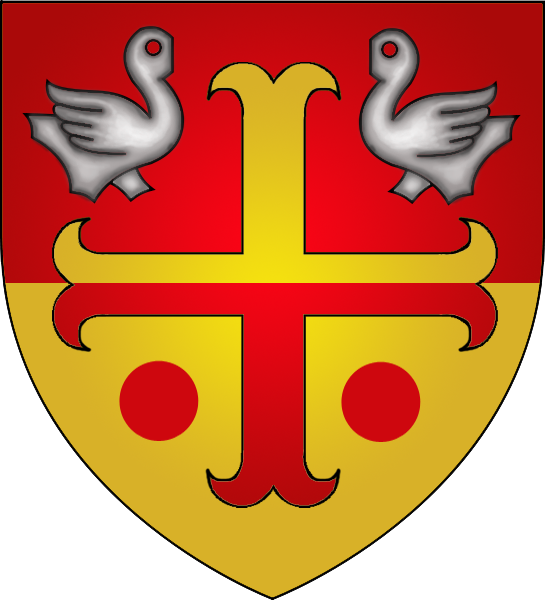
- Coat of arms

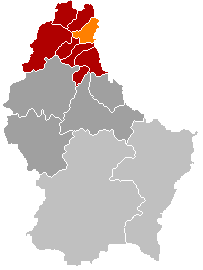
- Map of Luxembourg with the former commune of Heinerscheid highlighted in orange, and the canton in dark red
- Coordinates: 50.0958°N 6.0875°E
- Country: Luxembourg
- Canton: Clervaux
- Time zone: UTC+1 (CET)
  - Summer (DST): UTC+2 (CEST)
- Website: heinerscheid.lu

Heinerscheid (German pronunciation: [ˈhaɪnɐʃaɪt]; Luxembourgish: Hengescht) is a small town in northern Luxembourg, in the commune of Clervaux.

It was its own commune until its merger with Clervaux in 2009.

As of September 2026, the town of Heinerscheid has a population of 682.

== Former commune ==
The former commune consisted of the villages:

- Fischbach (Fëschbech)
- Grindhausen (Grandsen)
- Heinerscheid (Hengescht)
- Hupperdange (Hëpperdang)
- Kalborn (Kaalber)
- Lieler (Léiler)
- Fossenhof (Fossenhaff) (lieu-dit)
- Kaesfurt (Kéisfuert) (lieu-dit)
- Kalborn-Moulin (Kaalber Millen) (lieu-dit)
- Lausdorn (Lausduer) (lieu-dit) - partially shared with the Commune of Wäisswampech
- Tintesmühle (Tëntesmillen) (lieu-dit)

== Notable people ==
- Pierre Johanns (1882–1955), a Luxembourgish Jesuit priest, missionary in India and Indologist.
