= Urspelt Castle =

Castle in Luxembourg

Coordinates: 50°04′28″N 6°02′43″E

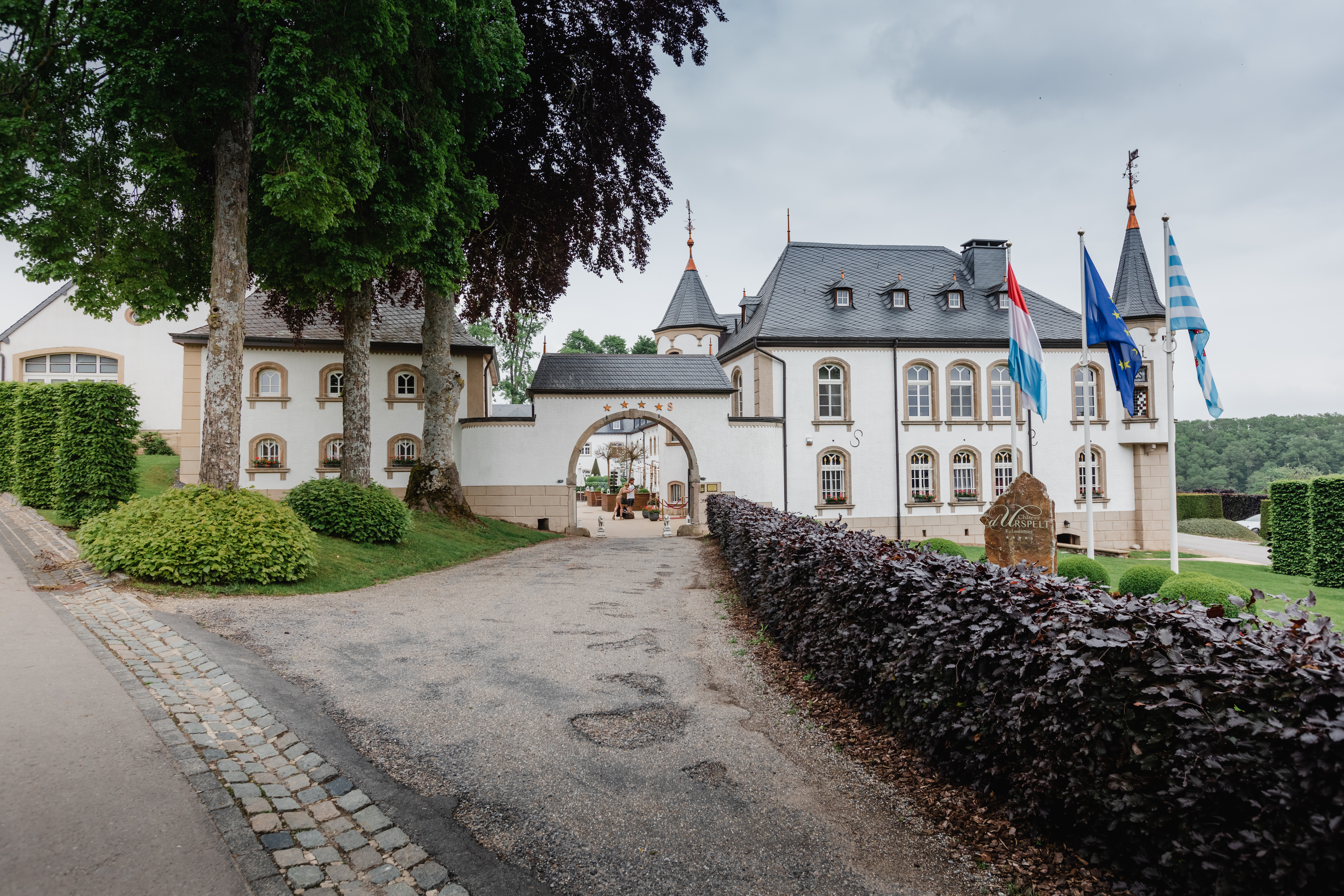
Urspelt Castle entrance (2024).

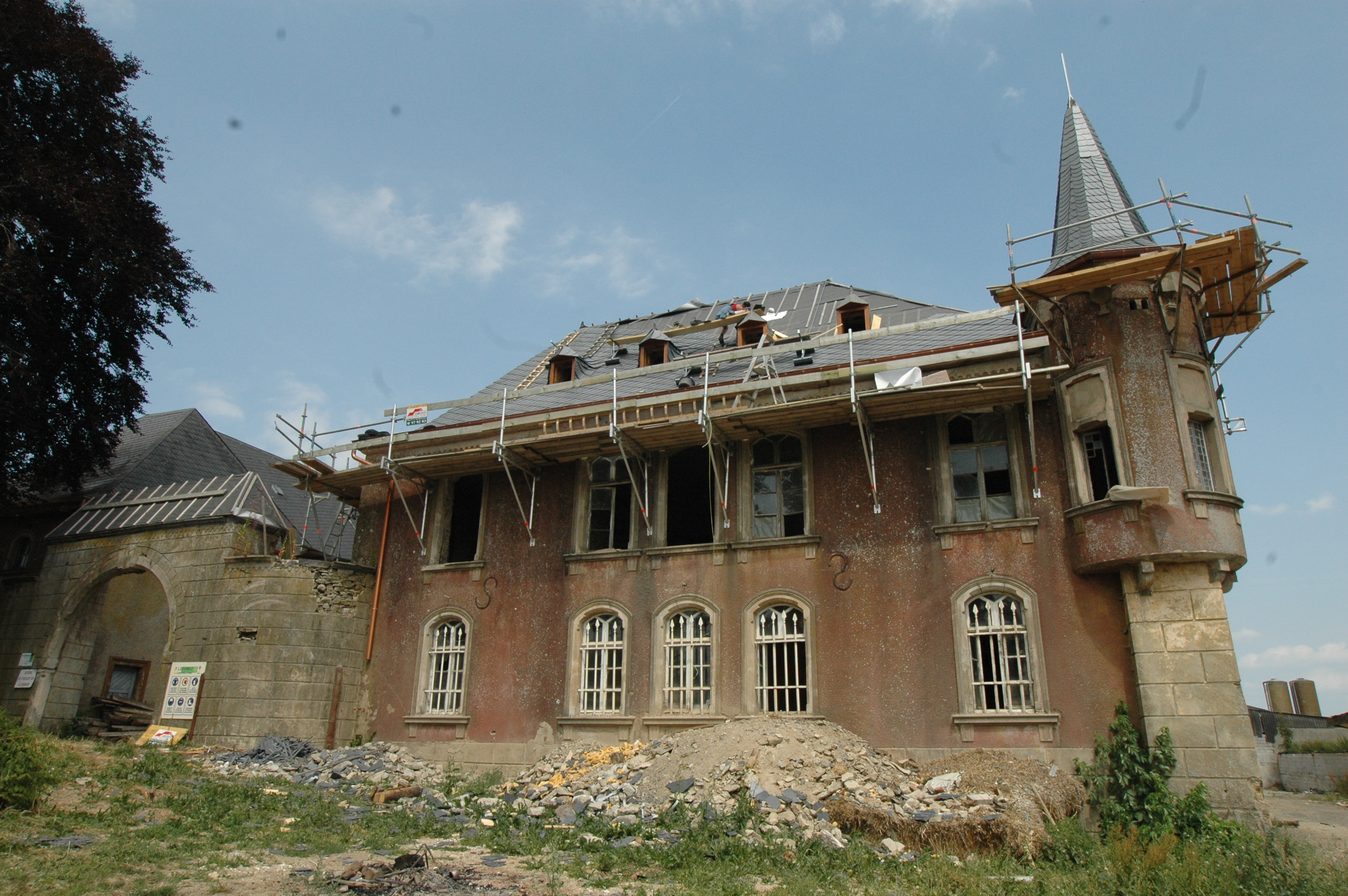
Urspelt Castle (2005).

Urspelt Castle (Luxembourgish: Schlass Ischpelt; French: Château d'Urspelt) is located in the village of Urspelt some 3 km (2 mi) north-east of Clervaux in northern Luxembourg. Though the castle has a history going back at least three centuries, today's building dates from 1860. After comprehensive restoration work and additions, it recently opened as a hotel and resort.

== History ==
The origin of the current castle dates back over 300 years, when it was built on the vestiges of a building dating back to the 13th century.

During the Second World War, the castle was by turns a command post and a field hospital.

The Germans used the castle as their headquarters for northern Luxembourg until they were forced to abandon it to the Americans during the Battle of the Bulge in the winter of 1944. It was a command post of Lieutenant Colonel Donald Paul, commanding officer of the 1st Battalion, 110th Infantry.

Abandoned on the liberation of Luxembourg, the damaged castle was left a ruin.

== The castle today ==
After three years of renovations, the castle, complete with a well dating back to the 11th century, was renovated, classified as “a National Monument of Luxembourg,” and reopened as a 4-star hotel and spa.

Constantly evolving, the Urspelt Castle was notably expanded in 2016 with the addition of a 1800 m² wing, responding to the major demand for this unique hotel project.
