= Drauffelt railway station =

Railway station in Luxembourg

Drauffelt Draufelt
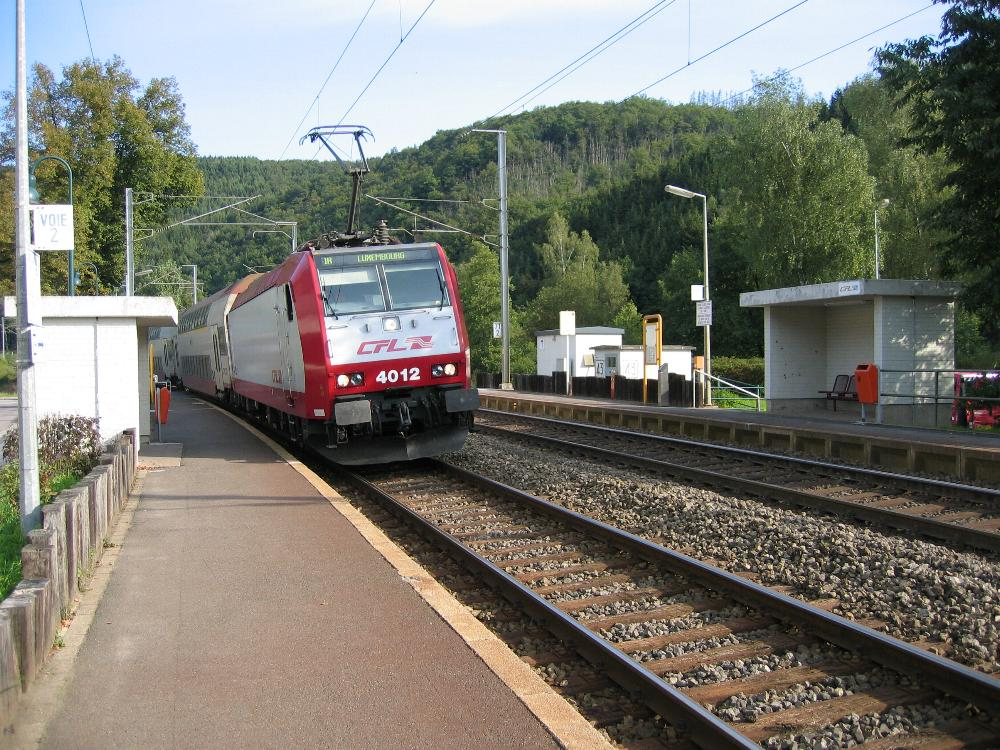

General information
- Location: Rue de la Gare; L-9746 Drauffelt; Luxembourg
- Coordinates: 50°01′01″N 06°00′25″E
- Operator: Chemins de Fer Luxembourgeois, SNCB
- Line: CFL Line 10
- Platforms: 2
- Tracks: 2
- Connections: RGTR bus line 143

Construction
- Parking: 49 parking spaces

Other information
- Website: CFL

History
- Opened: 3 October 1889

Passengers
- 2022: 50,945
- Rank: 52 of 60

Services
Preceding station	CFL	Following station
Wilwerwiltz towards Luxembourg	Line 10	Clervaux towards Troisvierges
Preceding station	NMBS/SNCB	Following station
Wilwerwiltz towards Luxembourg	IC 33	Clervaux towards Liers
Location

Drauffelt railway station (Luxembourgish: Gare Draufelt, French: Gare de Drauffelt) is a railway station serving the village of Drauffelt, in the commune of Clervaux, in northern Luxembourg. It is operated by Chemins de Fer Luxembourgeois, the state-owned railway company.

The station is situated on Line 10, which connects Luxembourg City to the centre and north of the country.
