= Battle of Clervaux =

1944 battle during World War II

- Part of the Battle of the Bulge during World War II
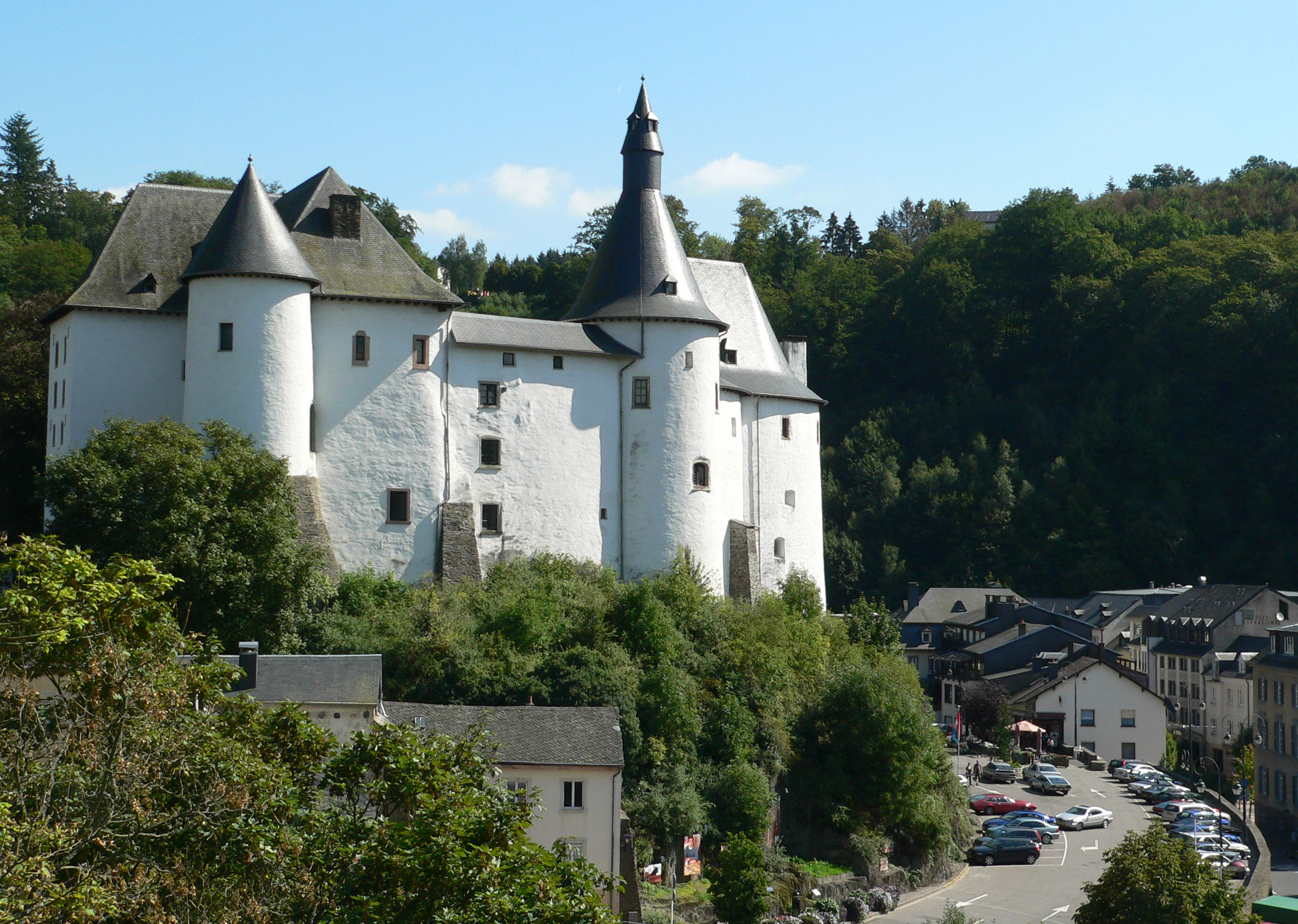
- Clervaux Castle was the last stand of the defenders
Date	16–18 December 1944
Location	Clervaux, northern Luxembourg 50°03′18″N 6°01′48″E
Result	German victory

Belligerents
Germany	United States

Commanders and leaders
(Nazi Germany) Meinrad von Lauchert	(United States) Hurley Fuller (POW)

Strength
1 panzergrenadier regiment 1 panzer regiment	1 regimental combat team 1 tank battalion 1 tank company 1 tank destroyer battalion

Casualties and losses
Significant; 4 tanks destroyed	2,000–2,750; 60 tanks destroyed

The Battle of Clervaux or the Battle for Clervaux (in English sources, Clervaux is occasionally called by the German name Clerf) was an opening engagement of the Battle of the Bulge that took place in the town of Clervaux in northern Luxembourg. It lasted from December 16 to 18, 1944. German forces encircled numerically inferior American forces, primarily from the 28th Infantry Division's 110th Infantry Regiment and the 109th Field Artillery Battalion, and quickly forced them to surrender. The battle has been referred to as the Luxembourg "Alamo".

Clervaux was the first tank battle of the Ardennes offensive and ended in defeat for the Americans, who permanently lost nearly 60 tanks while the Germans lost four.

== Background ==
Striking at 5:30 a.m. on Saturday, 16 December, the Germans achieved almost total surprise in breaking through Allied lines, beginning what is commonly called the Battle of the Bulge. The German goal was to separate the American forces from the British and Canadian forces, and retake the important port city of Antwerp. By late afternoon the Germans had 14 divisions operating in the Ardennes, but the number would swell to an estimated 25 divisions with 600 tanks and 1,000 aircraft. The U.S. 106th Division, located in the most exposed positions along the corps line, and the 28th Division took the brunt of the attack. The 106th was later described as being "newly arrived and unpracticed", while the 28th had recently suffered heavy casualties in fighting to clear enemy forces from the Hürtgen Forest. For their part, the German forces were hampered by a lack of adequate preparatory reconnaissance. There was also a mismatch between the quality of their armored and SS formations, which fought well, and that of their regular infantry units, which consisted largely of poorly trained and poorly motivated replacements.

== Prelude ==
Major General Troy H. Middleton, headquartered in Bastogne, was awakened by a guard and could hear the guns from there. Throughout the day, the 106th was able to hold its position, but additional German units poured in during the night. Much of the 106th was on the German side of the Our River in an area known as the Schnee Eifel. The division's commander, Major General Alan Jones, concerned about his two regiments east of the river, called Middleton. The conversation was interrupted by another call and then resumed. At the end of the conversation Middleton told an aide that he had given his approval to have the two regiments pull back to the west side of the river. Jones, on the other hand was convinced that Middleton had directed these units to stay and was further convinced of this by a written order from earlier in the day but just received. As a result of the miscommunication, the pullback did not occur and the two regiments were ultimately surrounded with most of the men captured on 17 December. While two of the 28th Division's regiments survived the German onslaught intact, and were able to inflict significant losses on German infantry formations, the 110th Regiment, commanded by Colonel Hurley Fuller from the Claravallis hotel, was directly in the path of the massive advance.

German forces of the Fifth Panzer Army under Hasso von Manteuffel's command, primarily from the 2nd Panzer Division, 116th Panzer Division and the 126th Infantry Division (another account suggests the 2nd Panzer, Panzer Lehr Division and the 26th Volksgrenadier Division) attacked the American 110th Regiment from the 28th Division on December 16. The 110th's regimental headquarters, and most of its strength, were in the town of Clervaux. The unit also received support from a tank company from the 9th Armored Division as well from the 103rd Engineer Battalion under Captain Parrett, and 109th Field Artillery Battalion under Lt. Col. Robert E. Ewing. Despite this support, German forces had significant superiority in the region, and the engagement was described as a "couple of infantry companies and one company of light tanks versus substantial elements of an entire panzer corps." Fuller described the opposing forces as "two Panzer divisions and one infantry division." Bergström identified the U.S. defenders of Clervaux as the 110th Regimental Combat Team, 707th Tank Battalion, the 630th Tank Destroyer Battalion and a tank company from the 2nd Tank Battalion.

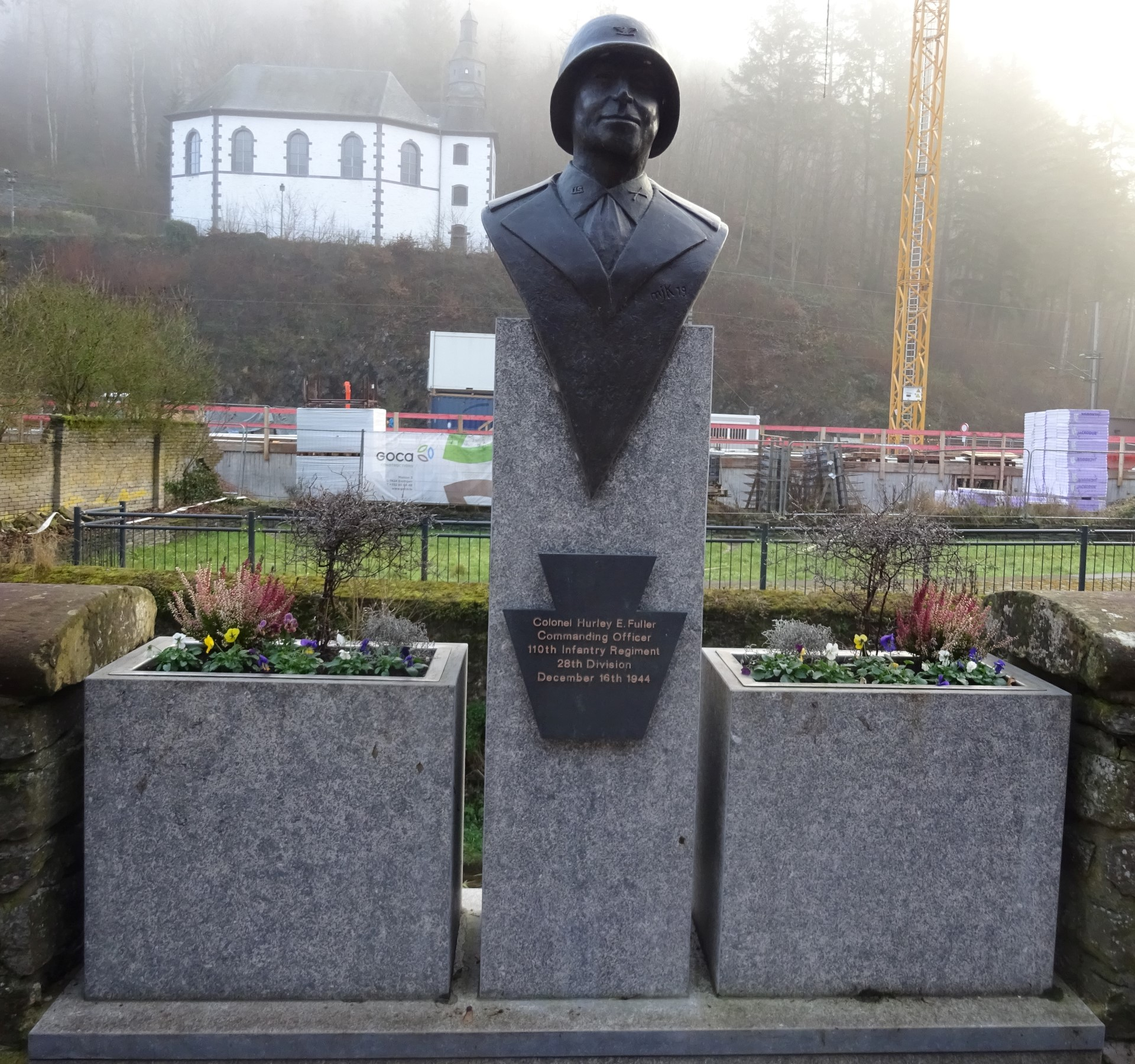
Colonel Fuller memorial

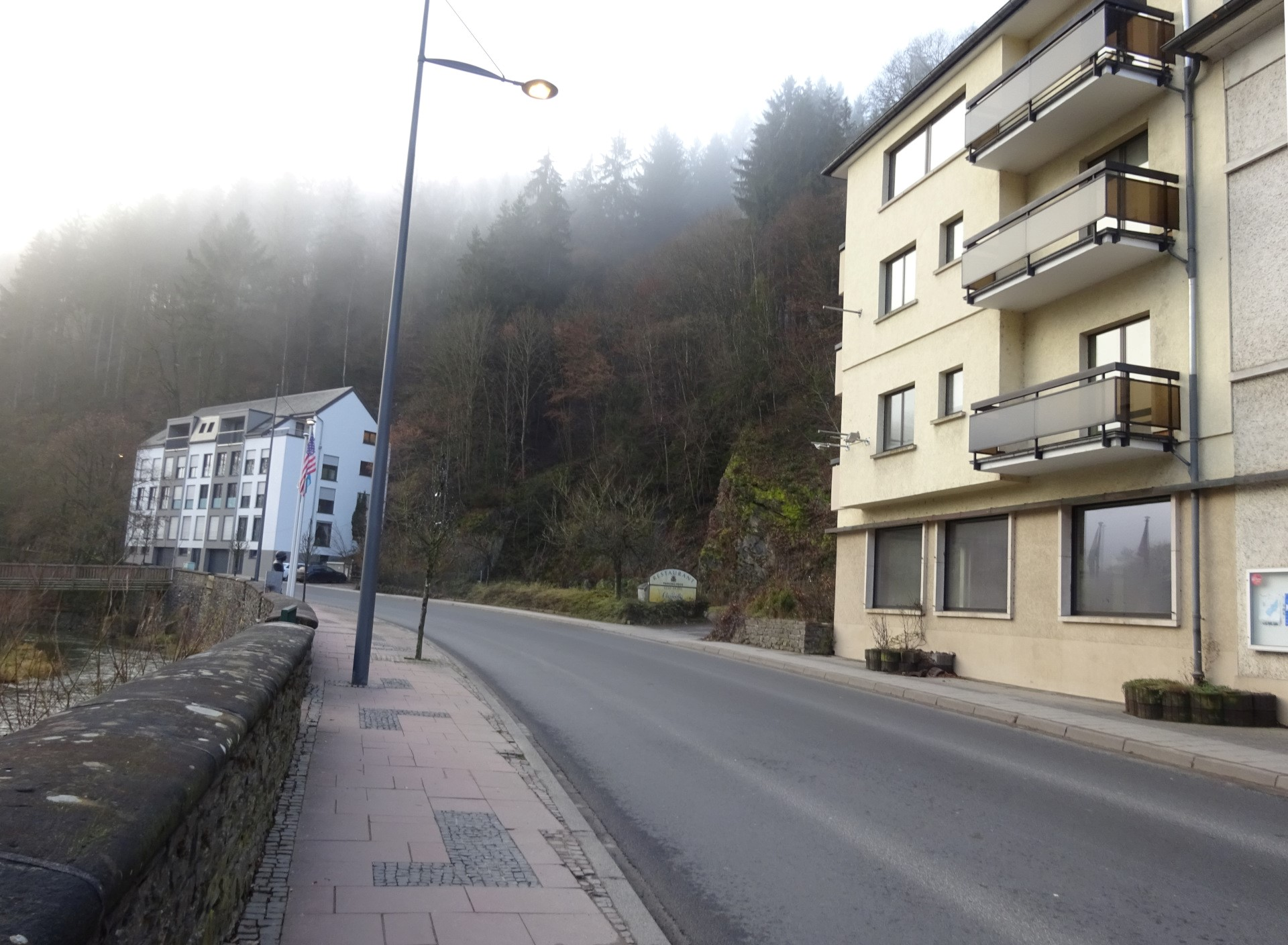
Hotel Claravallis (right)

== Battle ==
The attack by the light tank company of the 707th along the Skyline Drive was disastrous. About 0720 the company crossed into the 110th Infantry zone, where the ground rose away from the highway and forced the tanks to advance in column on the road. As the column emerged from the village of Heinerscheid, concealed high-velocity guns opened on the skimpily armored light tanks, picking them off like clay pipes in a shooting gallery. Eight tanks were knocked out by the enemy gunners and in the confusion three more fell prey to bazooka fire. The entire action lasted ten minutes.

— Hugh M. Cole,
The Ardennes: Battle of the Bulge, United States Army in World War II, p 188.

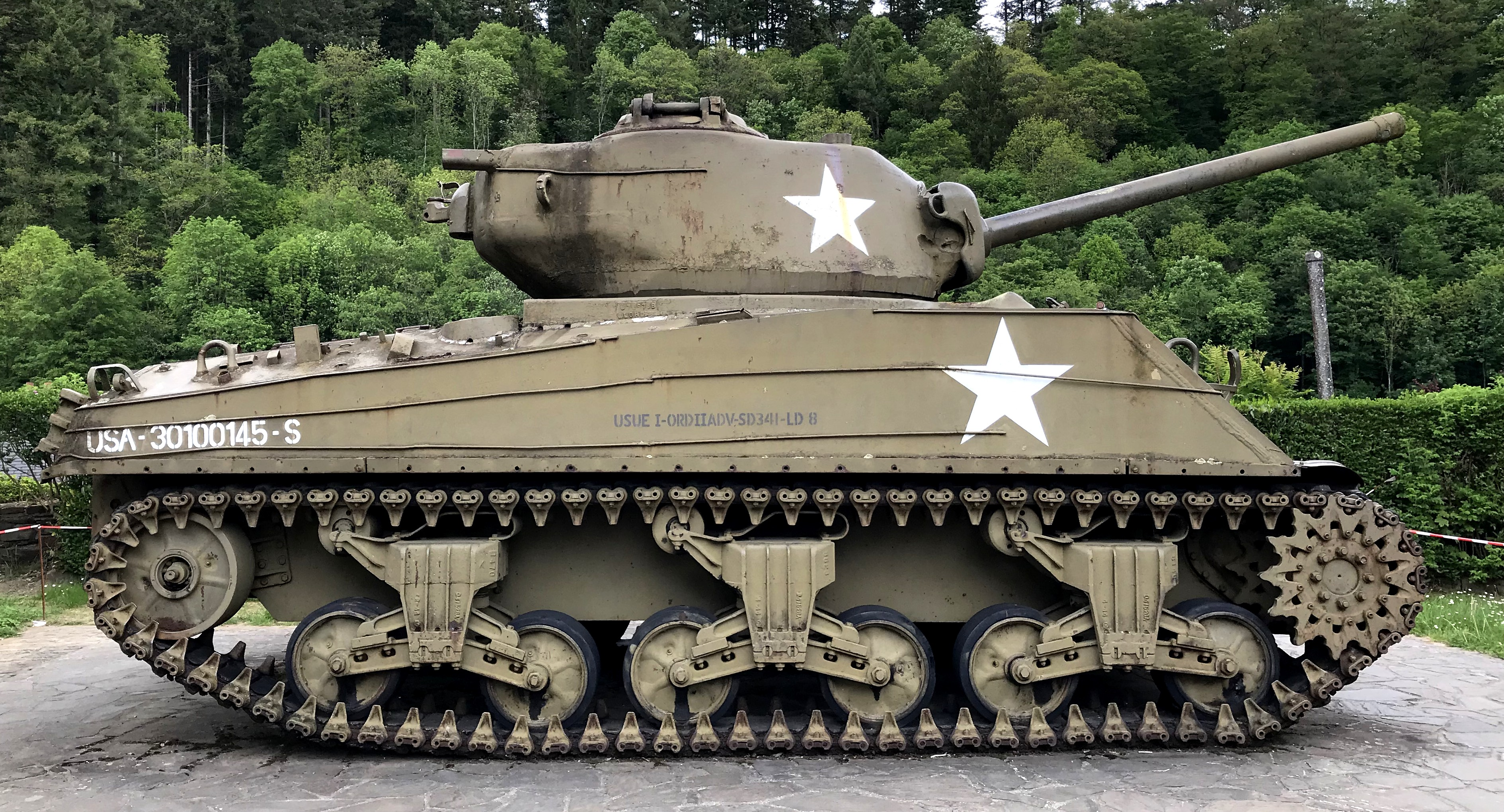
One of the American tanks, now in front of the castle

At 09:30 on 17 December, the 2nd Panzer Division attacked Clervaux, with six German Stug IIIs from a Panzerjäger company and Panzergrenadiers in thirty armored vehicles advancing from the south. They were repulsed by five Shermans from the 707th Tank Battalion, which knocked out two Stug IIIs, while losing three Shermans themselves. The burning vehicles blocked any further German progress along the narrow road. The Germans then detoured by attacking the northern part of the U.S. position. Their attack was successful as the Sherman tanks of the 2nd Tank Battalion, supported by some anti-tank guns of the 630th Tank Destroyer Battalion, were no match for two platoons of Panzer IVs from Panzer-Regiment 3. The Americans lost fourteen Shermans and most of their crews.

Colonel von Lauchert, commander of the 2nd Panzer Division, was concerned about the division's slow rate of advance. Clervaux was a main objective of von Manteuffel's tank drive on Bastogne because of its strategic location on the main highway leading to Bastogne. Clervaux should have fallen before noon on the 16th according to the original German timetable. Instead, it was still holding on on the morning of 17 December, with no indications as to how soon German forces would be able to secure it. As a precaution, Colonel von Lauchert sent a Kampfgruppe to seize a bridge south of Clervaux, so that he could move his attack column to another, although poorer road, in the event that Clervaux continued to hold.

With the forces of the 2nd Battalion, 110th, shattered or falling back, the ring around Clervaux was already closed on three sides by 15.00 and would grow tighter by the hour. A single 57mm antitank gun crew of the 2nd Battalion, 110th, guarded the bridge near the railroad station where the road coming down from the north entered the town in a desperate attempt to slow the enemy down as officers of the 110th were destroying regimental records in the 110th Headquarters in the Claravallis Hotel just on the other side of the bridge. Although the head-on clash with a small tank force from the 707th had momentarily stopped the German push on Clervaux, the enemy forces were putting more pressure on the defenders. The advancing 2nd Panzer's 2nd Grenadier Regiment obliterated the 57mm gun and its crew, some wounded, scattered into the dense forest along the cliffs above the bridge then breaching the last defense of Clervaux from the north. At about 17.00, with no opposition, a tank platoon from the Kampfgruppe which Colonel von Lauchert had sent to seize a bridge south of Clervaux wound its way into town from that direction.

At about 18.00, realizing it was hopeless to attempt to hold Clervaux, Fuller contacted and requested permission to withdraw and establish a defensive line along the high ground west of town from Colonel Jesse L. Gibney, Division Chief of Staff who refused his request. Gibney told Fuller he must "continue to defend in place without giving ground." Fuller was furious at what he thought was Gibney's uncomprehending attitude and asked to speak to Major General Norman Cota, the commander of the 28th Infantry Division, but was denied. Gibney said Fuller was not at the division command post and could not be reached by phone. Fuller realized that he had no choice but to carry out orders, but warned Gibney that as far as the men of Clervaux were concerned, it "would be the Alamo all over again". At that moment, a German Panzer coming down the north road into Clervaux began pumping 75mm shells into the ground floor of the 110th Headquarters in the Clarvallis Hotel. Gibney heard the explosions and asked what was happening to which Fuller replied a "Tiger tank is laying 88mm shells in my lap" and that orders or no orders he was leaving while there was still time. Despite Gibney attempting to protest, Fuller hung up. Fuller called for volunteers to remain with the wounded who had taken shelter in the basement of the hotel and at around 19.30, he and as many in the building as were able to travel, including civilians, escaped the through third floor back windows via a narrow metal fire escape and climbed a rock cliff behind the hotel and struck out for Eselborn past the Benedictine Monastery on the ridge.

Panzer IVs were radioed and drove to the center of the town from the north, guns blazing, and American soldiers now trapped in the town surrendered. Some 100 American defenders still held Clervaux Castle. Finally, on the morning of 18 December, the defenders of the castle made their last radio contact with the 28th Division command post at Wiltz at 10.00 hours after which they set fire to their radio vehicle with a thermite grenade. The officers and men under Captain Clark Mackey, commander of the 110th's Headquarters Company, and Captain John Aiken, out of ammunition and with the castle on fire from incendiary shells fired on them, stepped outside the castle, displaying a white flag and for the first time in three days, silence fell upon Clervaux. Captain Aiken attributed the Americans being treated well upon surrender to their fair treatment of 15 German POWs held in the castle. Some troops made it out of town but many, like Colonel Fuller, were later taken prisoner outside of Clervaux before they reached the Allied lines. The 2nd Panzer Division’s timetable was so badly disrupted at Clervaux, there was no longer a question of who would win the race to Bastogne.

== Aftermath ==
Though the 110th Regiment and the 109th Field Artillery Battalion were shattered, the stubborn resistance offered by them and other VIII Corps units greatly slowed the German timetable. The 110th lost 2,750 men during the first days of the Ardennes battle, but how many of these were lost at Clervaux remains unknown. The 630th Tank Destroyer Battalion lost 30 out of 36 anti-tank guns on 17 December, most at Clervaux.

== Bibliography ==
- Bergström, Christer (2014), The Ardennes: Hitler's Winter Offensive 1944-1945, Havertown: Casemate Publishers, ISBN 978-1-61200-277-4
- Eisenhower, Dwight D. (1948). Crusade in Europe. Garden City, NY: Doubleday & Co.
- Eisenhower, David (1986). Eisenhower at War 1943–1945. New York: Random House. ISBN 0-394-41237-0.
- MacDonald, Charles B. (1985). A Time for Trumpets, the Untold Story of the Battle of the Bulge. New York: William Morrow & Co. ISBN 0-688-03923-5.
- Price, Frank James (1974). Troy H. Middleton, a Biography. Baton Rouge: Louisiana State University Press. ISBN 0-8071-2467-2.
- McManus, John (2008). Alamo in the Ardennes: The Untold Story of the American Soldiers Who Made the Defense of Bastogne Possible. Dutton Caliber. ISBN 978-0451225580.
- Phillips, Robert F. (1983). To Save Bastogne. Briarcliff Manor, New York: Stein and Day, Inc. ISBN 0-8128-2907-7
