= Fischbach, Clervaux =

Coordinates: 50.0755°N 6.0654°E

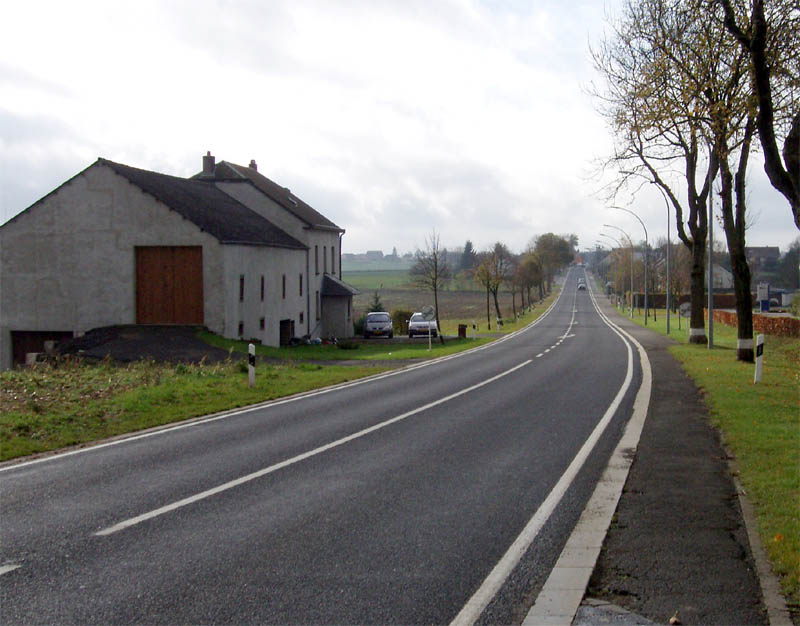
Street of Fischbach

Fischbach (German pronunciation: [ˈfɪʃˌbax]; Luxembourgish: Fëschbech) is a village in the commune of Clervaux, in northern Luxembourg. As of 2026, the village has a population of 127.

It was part of the commune of Heinerscheid until its merger with Clervaux in 2009.
