= Clervaux railway station =

Railway station in Luxembourg

Clervaux Klierf
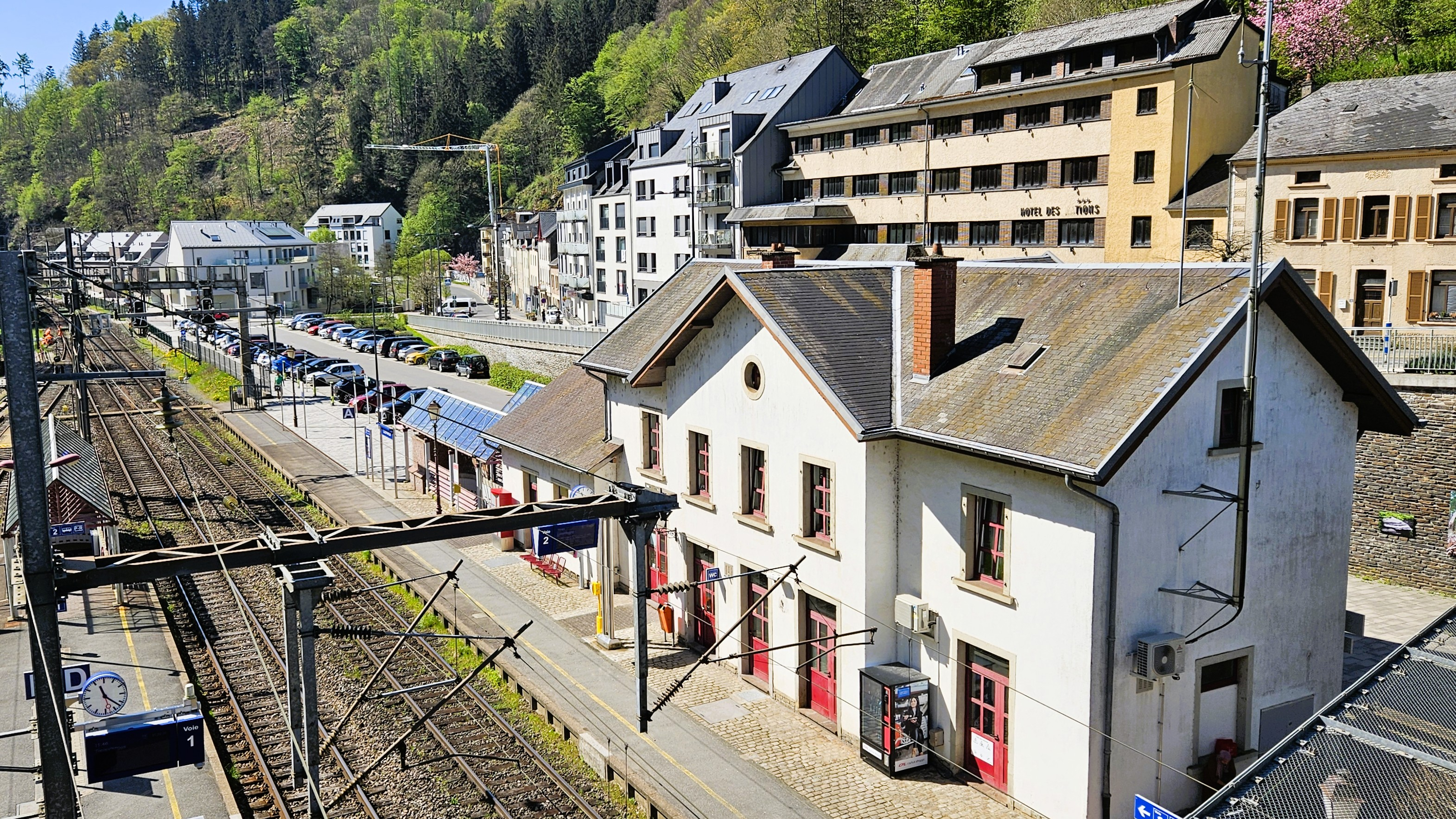

General information
- Location: 12, rue de la Gare; L-9707 Clervaux; Luxembourg
- Coordinates: 50°03′41″N 06°01′29″E
- Operator: Chemins de Fer Luxembourgeois, SNCB
- Line: CFL Line 10
- Platforms: 2
- Tracks: 3
- Connections: RGTR bus lines 160, 161, 162, 163, 164, 165 and 182

Construction
- Parking: 178 parking spaces
- Cycle facilities: 32 bikebox parking spaces; 9 bicycle parking spaces

Other information
- Website: CFL

History
- Opened: 15 December 1866

Passengers
- 2022: 331,186
- Rank: 19 of 60

Services
Preceding station	CFL	Following station
Drauffelt towards Luxembourg	Line 10	Troisvierges Terminus
Preceding station	NMBS/SNCB	Following station
Drauffelt towards Luxembourg	IC 33	Troisvierges towards Liers
Location

Clervaux railway station (Luxembourgish: Gare Klierf, French: Gare de Clervaux, German: Bahnhof Clerf) is a railway station serving Clervaux, in northern Luxembourg. It is operated by Chemins de Fer Luxembourgeois, the state-owned railway company.

The station is situated on Line 10, which connects Luxembourg City to the centre and north of the country.
