= Drauffelt =

Coordinates: 50°01′N 6°00′E

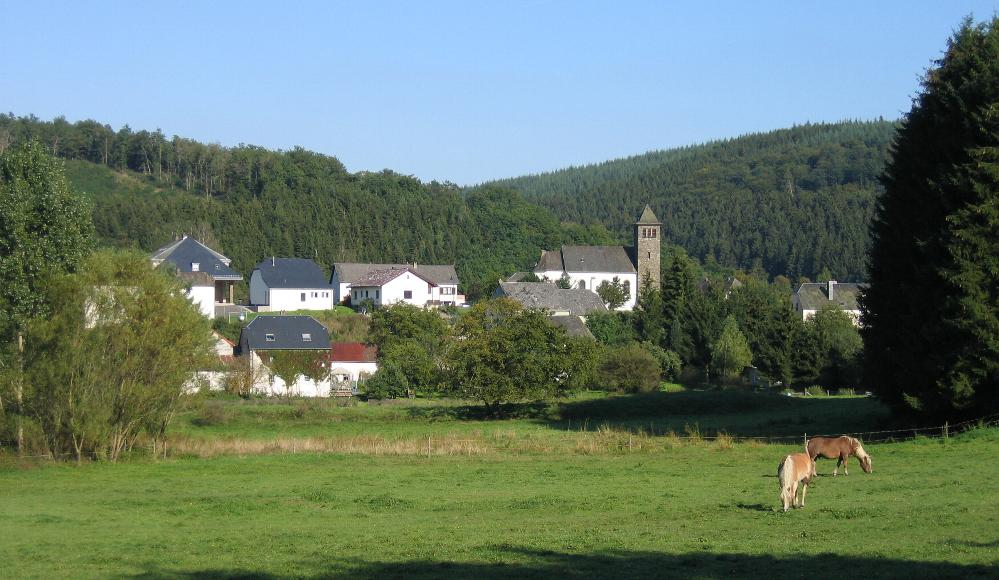
View of Drauffelt

Drauffelt (Luxembourgish: Draufelt) is a village in the commune of Clervaux, in northern Luxembourg. As of 2026, the village has a population of 265. Until 2009, it was part of the commune of Munshausen

== Description ==
Drauffelt contains a handful of roads and lanes, of which the most important is the Wëlzerstroos (Wiltz Street), connecting the towns of Clervaux and Wiltz. There is also the Duerefwee (Village Lane), the Schoulbireg (School Hill), the Millewee (Mill Lane), the Eiseboonswee (Railway Lane), a Gloden (at Glodens) and op der Insel (on the island). The village has a railway station on CFL Line 10, which connects Luxembourg City to Liège. There are hourly trains in both directions, even more in peak periods. The village has a church situated on a craggy hill, with a small green and a former school, used nowadays as a day nursery. Clervaux, the historical abbey town, is 4 miles to the north, whilst the larger Wiltz is 7 miles to the south west. Drauffelt is on the 325 road.
