= Clervaux Castle =

Castle in Luxembourg

Coordinates: 50°03′16″N 6°01′46″E

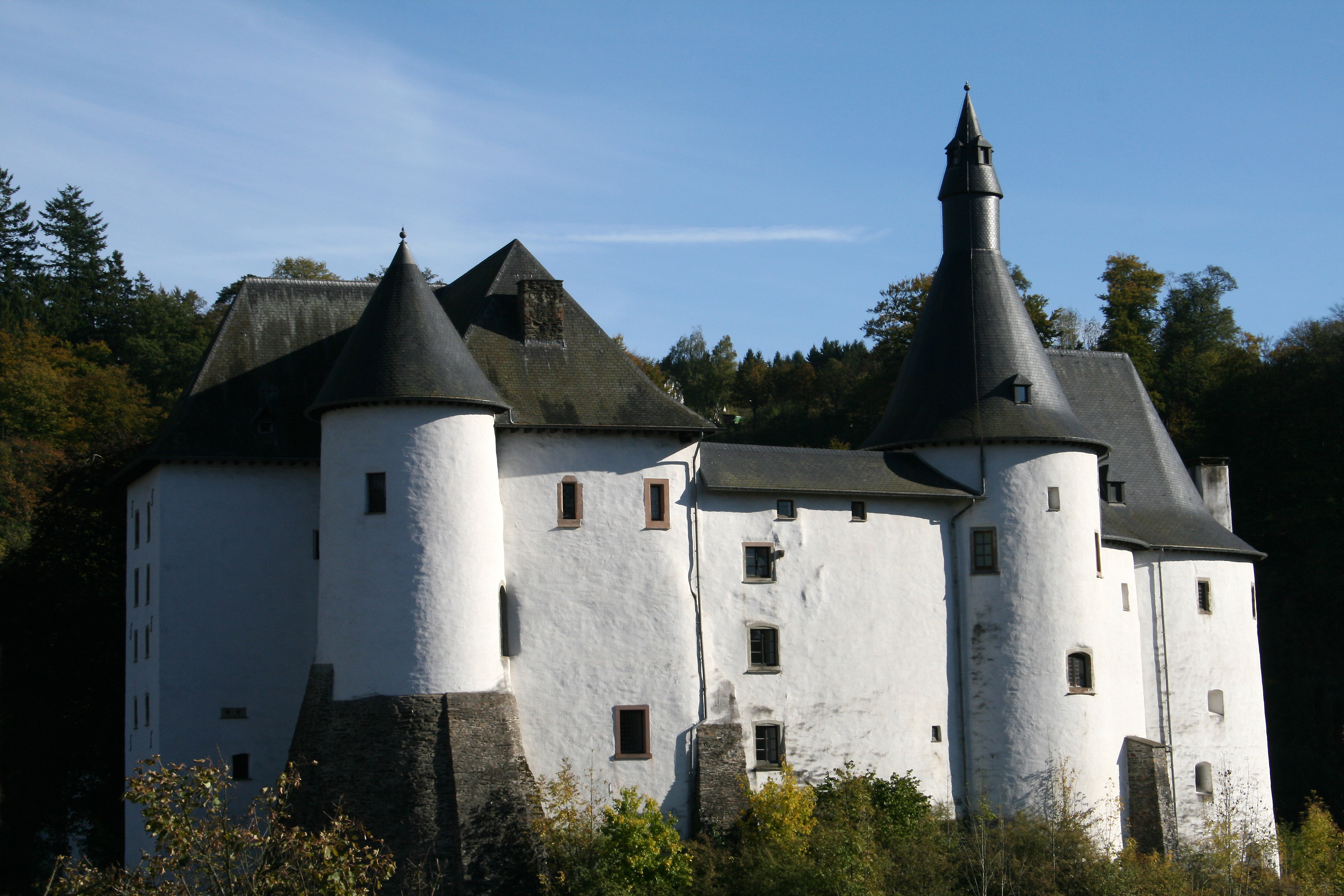
Clervaux Castle

Clervaux Castle (Luxembourgish: Schlass Klierf, German: Schloss Clerf, French: Château de Clervaux) in the town of Clervaux in Northern Luxembourg dates back to the 12th century. Destroyed by the fire in the Second World War during the Battle of the Bulge, the castle has now been fully rebuilt. It houses the commune's administrative offices as well as a museum containing an exhibition of Edward Steichen's photographs.

== Location ==
The castle stands at a height of 365 metres on a rocky spur above the town, surrounded on three sides by a loop in the River Clerve.

== History ==
The oldest parts of the castle from the 12th century were built by Gerard, Count of Sponheim, a brother of the Count of Vianden. The large palace and the rounded towers are probably from around 1400 when the prosperous Lords of Brandenbourg lived there.

In 1634, Claude of Lannoy built the reception halls, including the large Knights' Hall in the Spanish style of Flanders. In 1660, stables, storerooms and administrative buildings were added. Finally, in the 18th century, new stables were built.

Over the years, like other castles in Luxembourg, Clervaux fell into disrepair although it was partly restored and used as a hotel before it was finally destroyed in the Second World War during the Battle of Clervaux (December 16 to 18, 1944), part of the Battle of the Bulge.

== The castle today ==
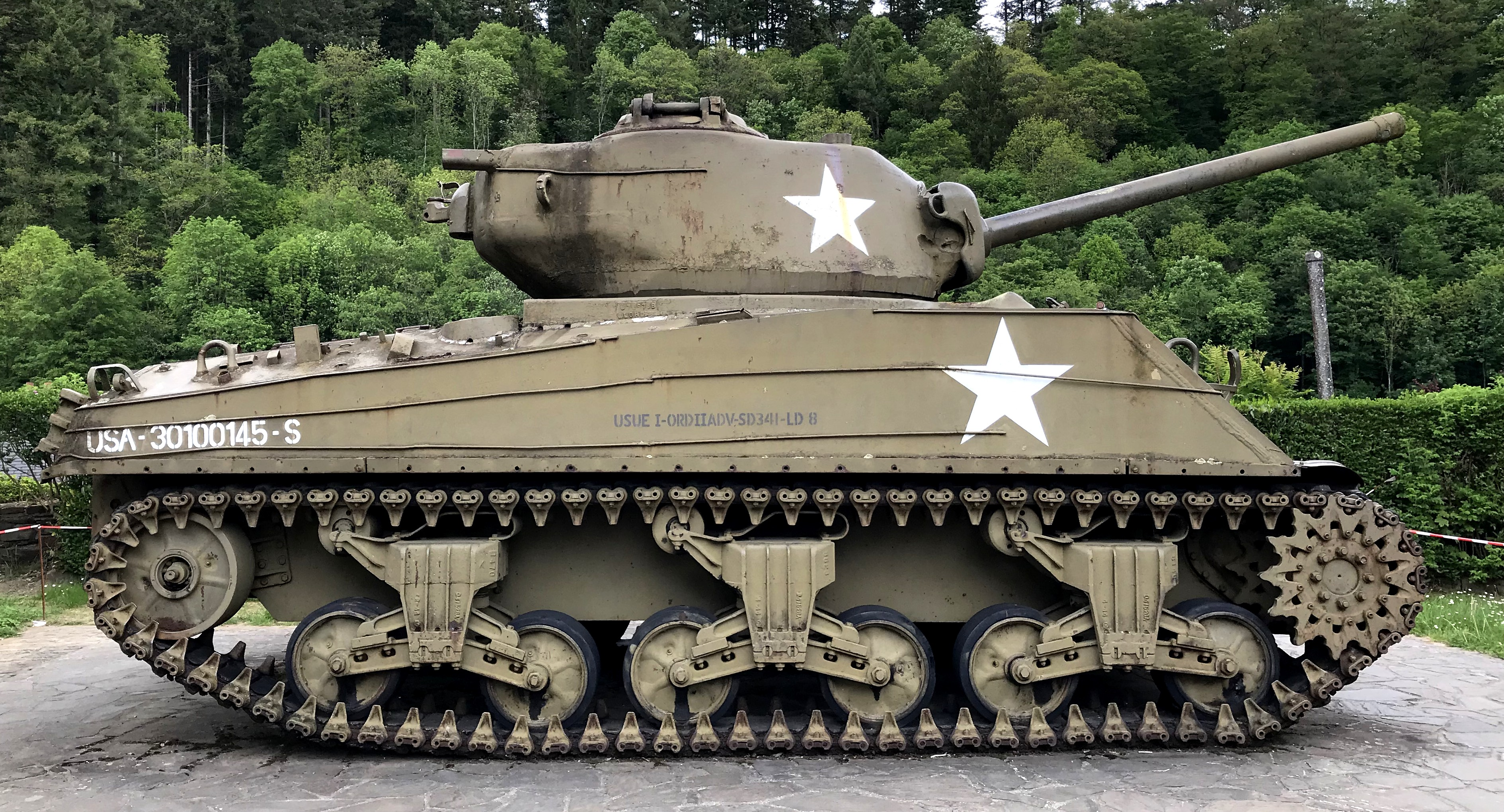
WW 2 Sherman American medium tank in front of the Clervaux Castle

After being fully restored after the war, the castle is now used partly as a museum and partly for housing the local administration.

The south wing houses an exhibition of models of Luxembourg's castles; the old kitchen in the Brandenbourg House. It is a museum devoted to the Battle of the Ardennes.

The upper floors house the permanent installation of the entire complement of 503 original and restored prints, the work of 273 photographers, from the exhibition The Family of Man, curated by Edward Steichen for The Museum of Modern Art in 1955 and which toured the world to be seen by 9 million visitors. Luxembourg was where Edward Steichen was born in 1879, in Bivange. The exhibition was first presented in the Castle in 1994 after restoration of the prints. The layout of the inaugural exhibition at MoMA is followed in order to recreate the original viewing experience, though necessarily adapted to the unique space of two floors of the restored Castle. Since further restoration of the photographs and displays in 2013 it now incorporates a library and contextualises The Family of Man with historical material and interpretation.

The remaining rooms are used for the services of the local administration.

== Visiting times ==
The castle is open to visitors every day from 10 am to 6 pm except Mondays. It is closed in January and February.

== See also ==
- List of castles in Luxembourg
