= Clervaux =

Clervaux Klierf (Luxembourgish) Clerf (German)
- Commune
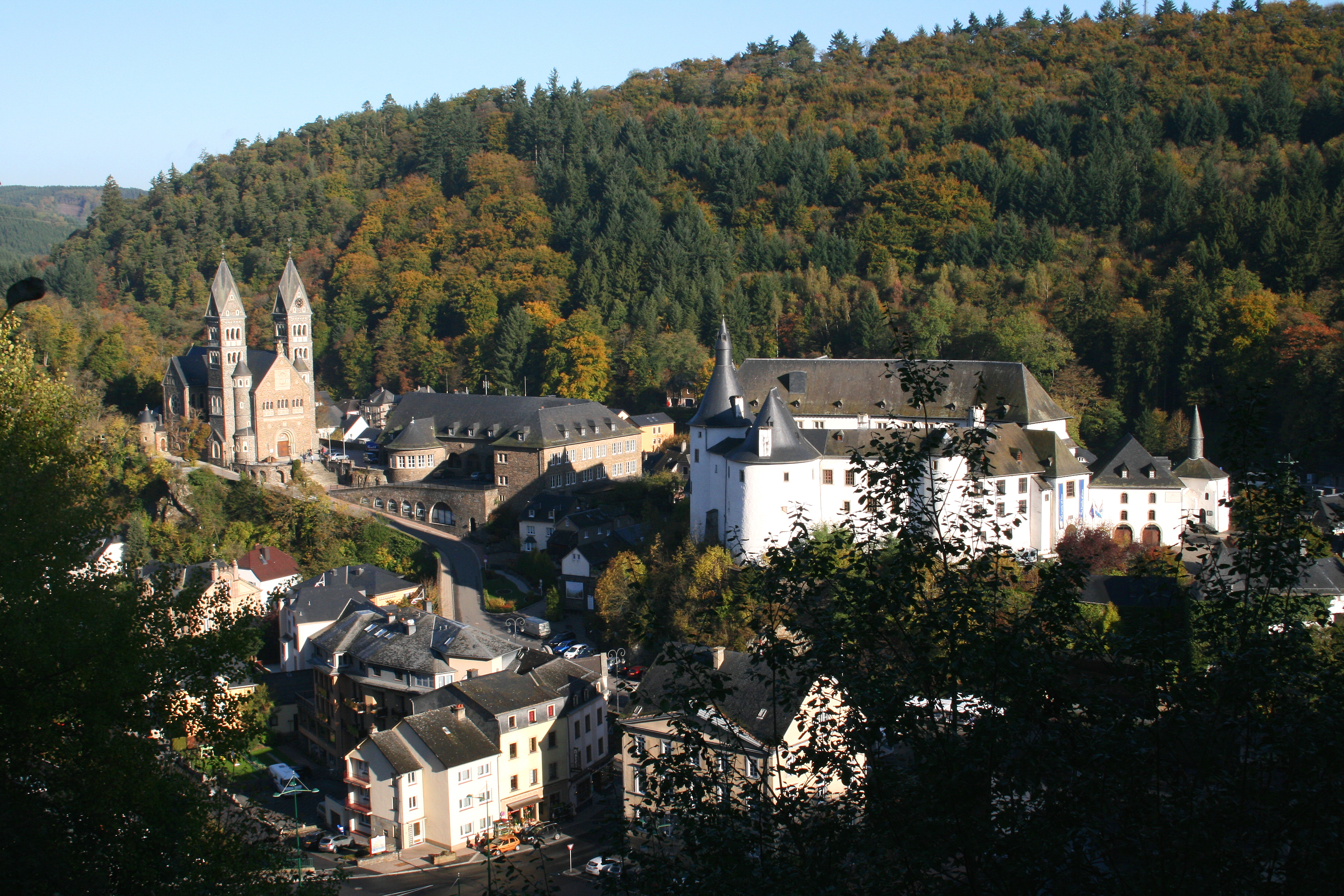

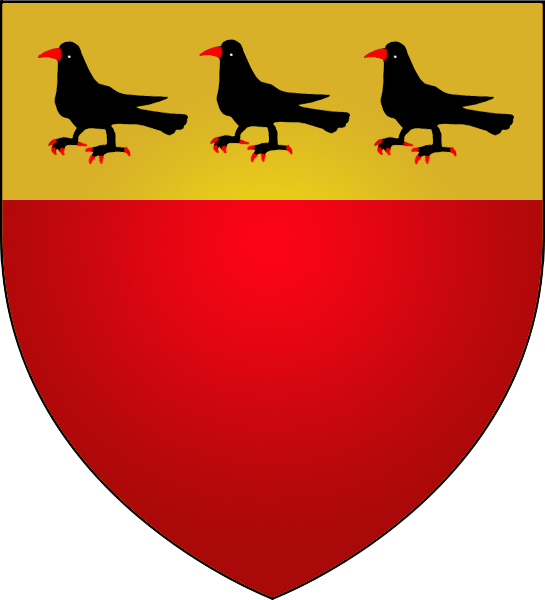
- Coat of arms

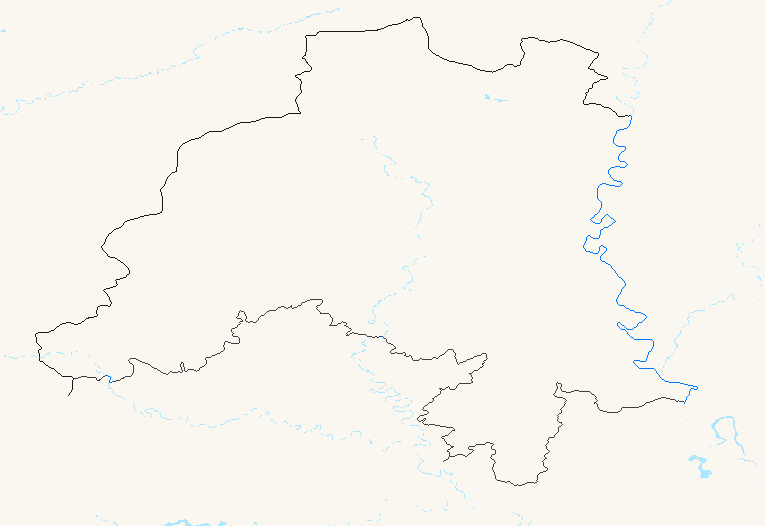
- Map of Clervaux 1 to 100 Scale With lakes
- Coordinates: 50.05°N 6.0333°E
- Country: Luxembourg
- Canton: Clervaux

Government
  - Mayor: Georges Keipes (Independent)

Area
  - Total: 85.05 km^{2} (32.84 sq mi)
  - Rank: 2nd of 100
- Highest elevation: 548 m (1,798 ft)
  - Rank: 3rd of 100
- Lowest elevation: 276 m (906 ft)
  - Rank: 77th of 100

Population (2025)
  - Total: 6,289
  - Rank: 25th of 100
  - Density: 73.94/km^{2} (191.5/sq mi)
  - Rank: 82nd of 100
- Time zone: UTC+1 (CET)
  - Summer (DST): UTC+2 (CEST)
- LAU 2: LU0000501
- Website: clervaux.lu

Clervaux (French: [klɛʁvo]; Luxembourgish: Klierf [kliɐ̯f] or locally Cliärref [ˈkli̯ɛʀəf]; German: Clerf [klɛʁf]) is a commune and town in northern Luxembourg, situated in the canton of the same name.

The town's arms, granted in 1896, show three blackbirds on a gold ground in the chief of a red shield, as a variation of the arms of the former Lords of Clervaux.

As of September 2026, the town of Clervaux, which lies in the southwest of the commune, has a population of 1,657.

== History ==
The village was founded around Clervaux Castle, oldest parts of the castle from the 12th century were built by Gerard, Count of Sponheim, a brother of the Count of Vianden. The large palace and the rounded towers are probably from around 1400 when the prosperous Lords of Brandenbourg lived there.

Over the years, like other castles in Luxembourg, Clervaux castle (inherited by a branch of the House of Lannoy) fell into disrepair although it was partly restored and used as a hotel before it was finally destroyed in the Second World War (but later rebuilt).

The city was indeed the site of heavy fighting during World War II, in the December 1944 Battle of Clervaux, part of the "Battle of the Bulge".

In 1901 the monks of Abbey of St. Maur of Glanfeuil in France, were compelled to leave France due to the anti-clerical laws of the Third French Republic. After finding refuge in Baronville, Belgium (now part of the municipality of Beauraing), the monks began to search for a permanent home. After various inquiries failed, they finally settled upon Clervaux. In 1908, a vote was taken by the monastic chapter, which made the decision to dissolve the existing monastery, and to found a new monastery there, dedicated to St. Maurice. Construction on the new Clervaux Abbey, designed in the Neo-Romanesque style by Johann Franz Klomp (1865-1946), a Dutch architect based in Germany, was begun in 1909 (the local parish church in Clervaux was also being built to Klomp’s design around the same time). The monks arrived in August 1910 to begin living at the new site. In 1926, the name of St. Maur was added to that of St. Maurice. In 1937, the Holy See established the monastery as a territorial abbey, independent of the authority of the local bishop. This status lasted until 1946.

Prince Charles of Luxembourg, the current heir apparent to the Luxembourgish throne, as the elder child and son of Grand Duke Guillaume V and Grand Duchess Stéphanie (by birth a member of the House of Lannoy), was baptised at Clervaux Abbey on 19 September 2020.

== Population ==
Historical population

| Year | Pop. | ±% |
|---|---|---|
| 1821 | 2,468 | — |
| 1851 | 3,868 | +56.7% |
| 1900 | 3,945 | +2.0% |
| 1910 | 4,197 | +6.4% |
| 1922 | 4,171 | −0.6% |
| 1935 | 3,991 | −4.3% |

| Year | Pop. | ±% |
|---|---|---|
| 1947 | 3,599 | −9.8% |
| 1960 | 3,196 | −11.2% |
| 1970 | 3,041 | −4.8% |
| 1981 | 2,834 | −6.8% |
| 1990 | 3,181 | +12.2% |
| 2000 | 3,315 | +4.2% |

| Year | Pop. | ±% |
|---|---|---|
| 2005 | 3,819 | +15.2% |
| 2010 | 4,231 | +10.8% |
| 2015 | 4,815 | +13.8% |
| 2020 | 5,463 | +13.5% |
| 2021 | 5,605 | +2.6% |

Source data

== Sights ==
The Family of Man, a famous exhibit of photos collected by Edward Steichen, is on permanent display in Clervaux Castle.

The castle also includes the Battle of the Bulge Museum, with an extensive collection of American, German, and Luxembourgish artifacts from World War II, and an exhibition of models of the castles and palaces of Luxembourg. A U.S. Sherman tank that participated in the battle for Clervaux and a German 88 anti-aircraft/anti-tank artillery piece are on display in front of the castle.

The Abbey of St. Maurice and St. Maur is situated on the hills above the town of Clervaux. Notable associations include Halldór Laxness, 1902–1998, the Nobel Prize-winning Icelandic writer, who converted to Roman Catholicism while staying at the abbey. A Roman Catholic mission to Scandinavia has for many years maintained a base at the abbey.

The town is also home to a parish church, built between 1910 and 1912 in the Rheinisch-Romanesque style, and to an eighteenth-century chapel.

== Notable people ==
- Édouard Thilges (1817–1904), a Luxembourgish politician; the 7th Prime Minister of Luxembourg, serving from 1885 to 1888.
- Émile Colling (1899–1981), a Luxembourgish medical doctor, politician and diplomat.
- Camille Dimmer (1939–2023), a Luxembourgish footballer, played 19 games for Luxembourg
- Marianne Majerus (born 1956), a leading specialist garden photographer

== Transportation ==
Clervaux railway station serves the town and the surrounding area, with trains to Luxembourg City and Liège, Belgium.

== Twin towns ==
Clervaux is twinned with:

- Horezu, Romania
- Eijsden-Margraten, Netherlands

== Populated places ==
The commune consists of the following villages:

Clervaux Section:

- Clervaux
- Eselborn (Eeselbur)
- Mecher (Mecher)
- Reuler (Reiler)
- Urspelt (Ischpelt)
- Weicherdange (Wäicherdang)
- Kaaspelterhof (Kaaspelt) (lieu-dit)
- Kirelshof (Kirelshaff) (lieu-dit)
- Wirtgensmühle (Wirtgensmillen) (lieu-dit)

Heinerscheid Section:

- Fischbach (Fëschbech)
- Grindhausen (Grandsen)
- Heinerscheid (Hengescht)
- Hupperdange (Hëpperdang)
- Kalborn (Kaalber)
- Lieler (Léiler)
- Fossenhof (Fossenhaff) (lieu-dit)
- Kaesfurt (Kéisfuert) (lieu-dit)
- Kalborn-Moulin (Kaalber Millen) (lieu-dit)
- Lausdorn^{*} (Lausduer) (lieu-dit)
- Tintesmühle (Tëntesmillen) (lieu-dit)

Munshausen Section:

- Drauffelt (Draufelt)
- Marnach (Maarnech)
- Munshausen (Munzen)
- Roder (Rueder)
- Siebenaler (Siwwenaler)

Note:
^{*} - partially shared with the Commune of Wäisswampech

== Gallery ==
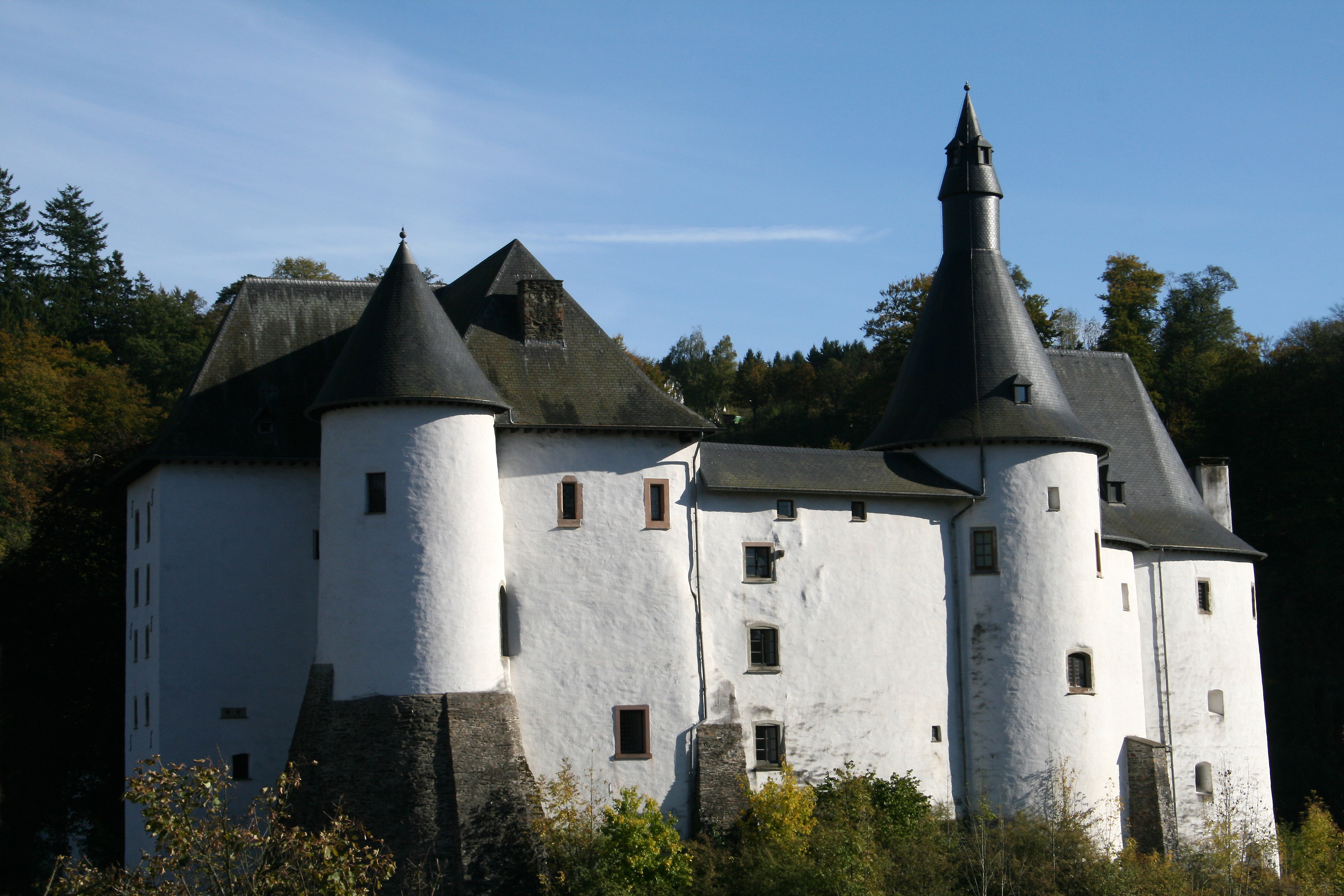
Castle of Clervaux

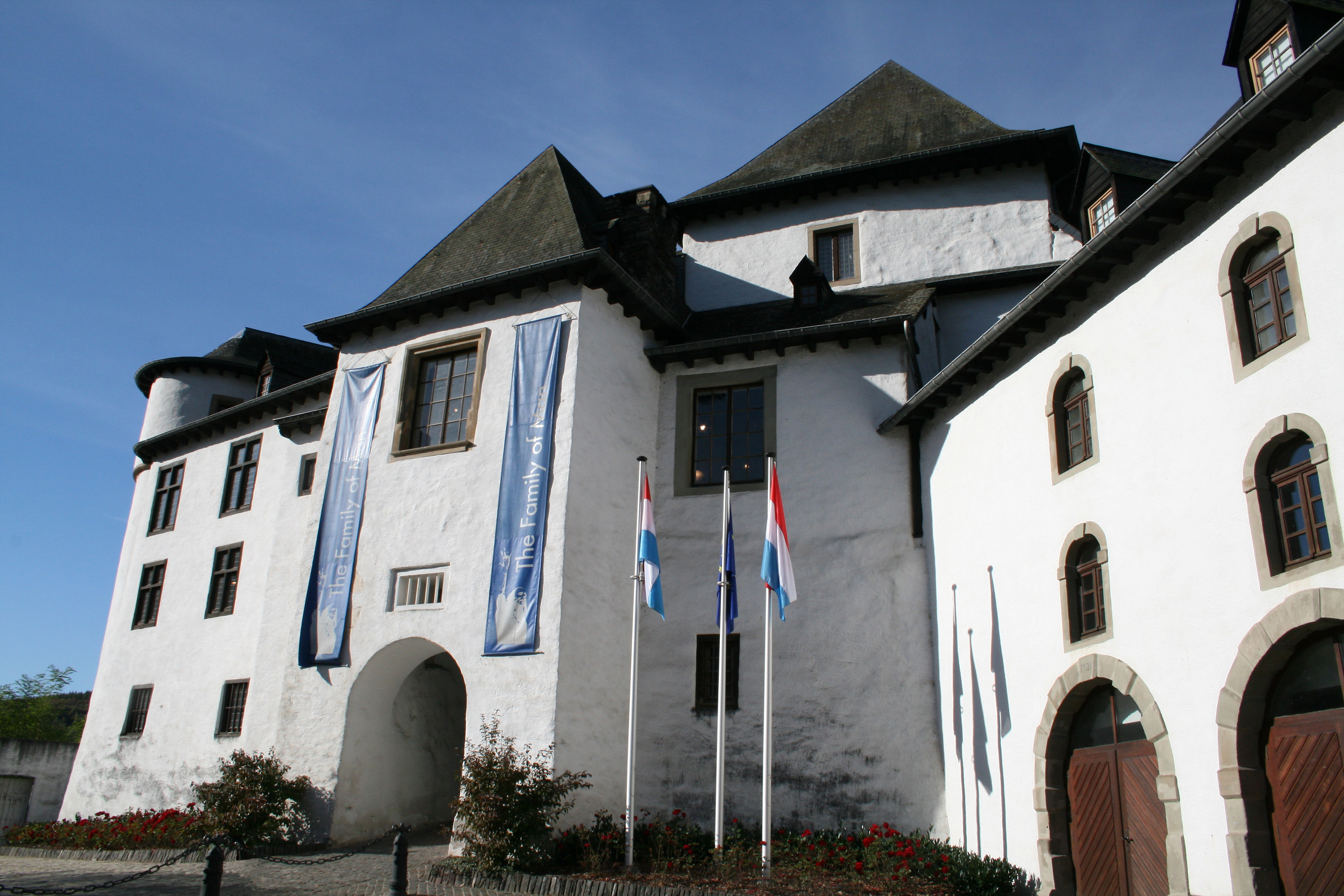
Castle of Clervaux

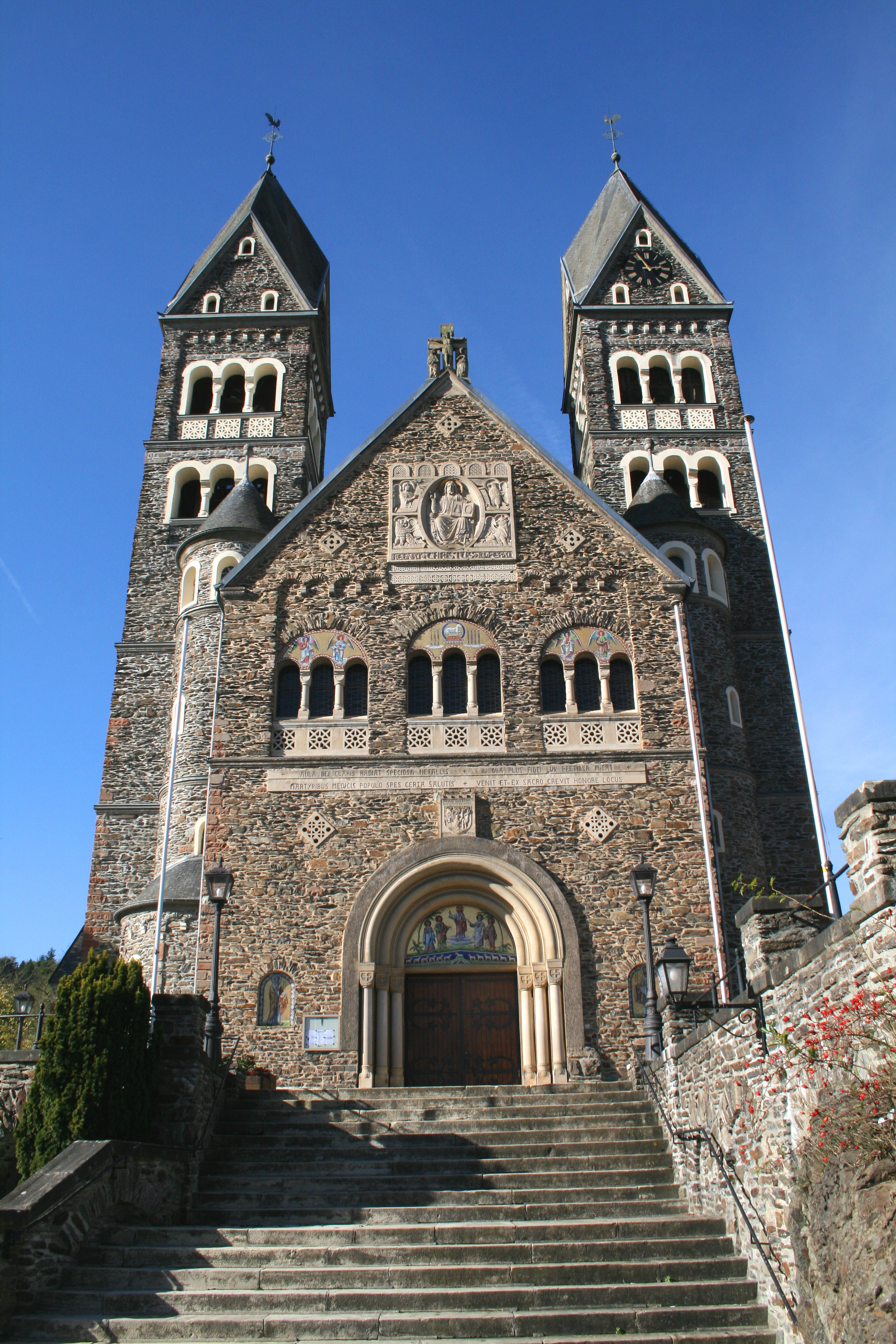
Church Saints Cosmas and Damian (1910-1912)
