= Weicherdange =

Village in Luxembourg

Coordinates: 50°02′N 5°59′E

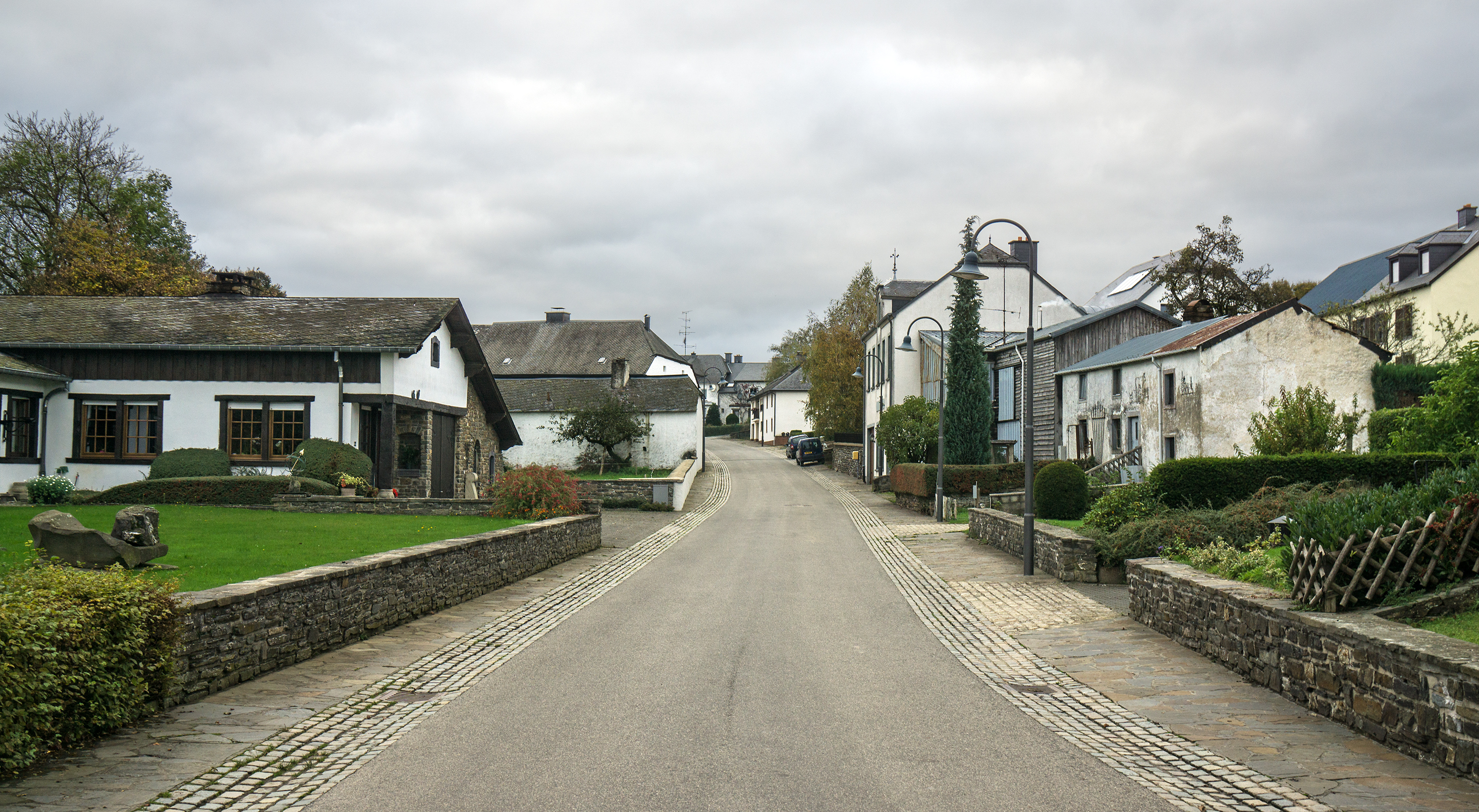
Main street in Weicherdange

Weicherdange (Luxembourgish: Wäicherdang, German: Weicherdingen) is a village in the commune of Clervaux, in northern Luxembourg. As of September 2026, the village has a population of 337.
