= Reuler =

Coordinates: 50°03′N 6°02′E

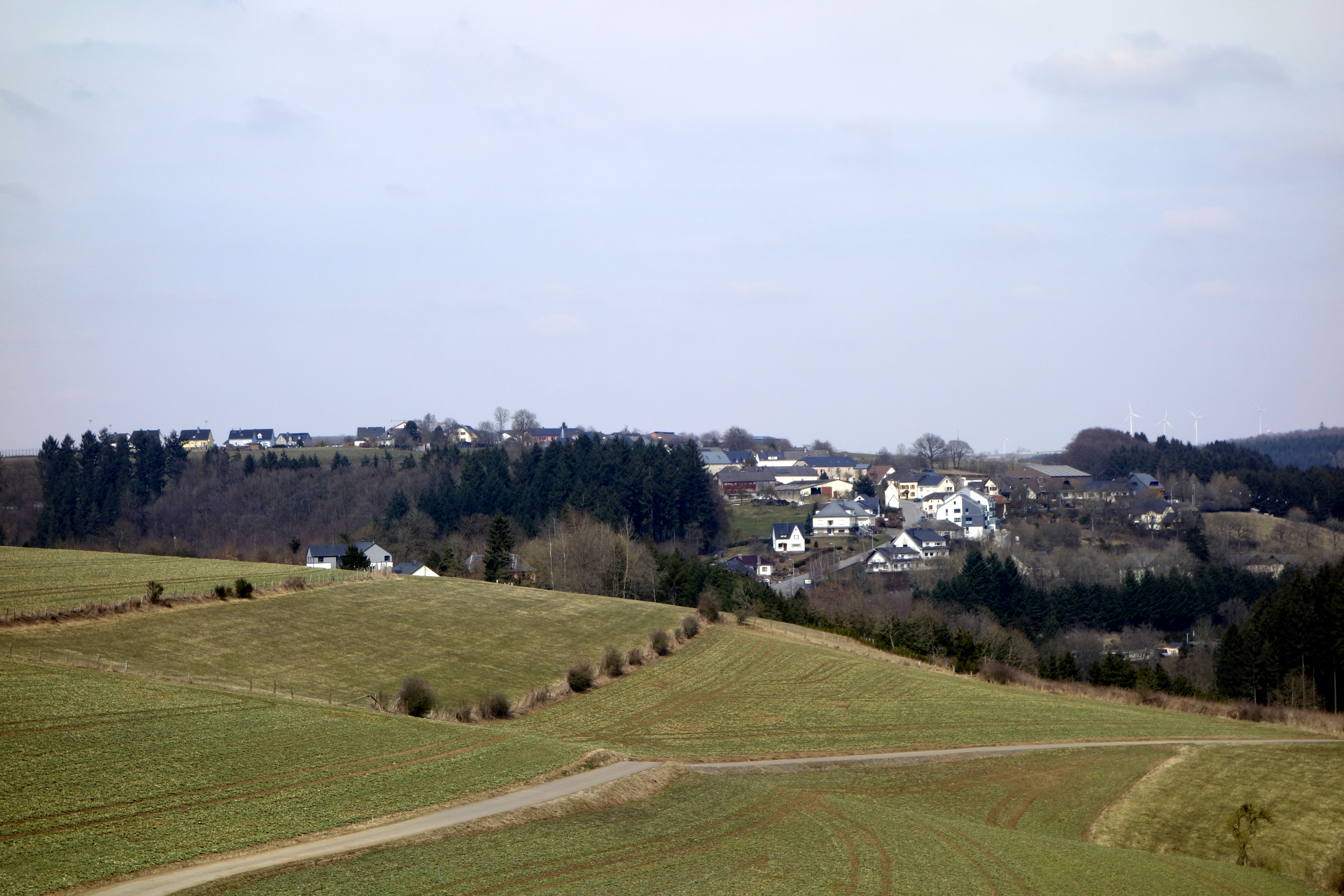
Reuler in 2013

Reuler (German pronunciation: [ˈʁɔʏlɐ]; Luxembourgish: Reiler) is a village in the commune of Clervaux, in northern Luxembourg. As of September 2026, the village has a population of 403.
