= Eselborn =

Luxembourgish town

Coordinates: 50°04′N 6°00′E

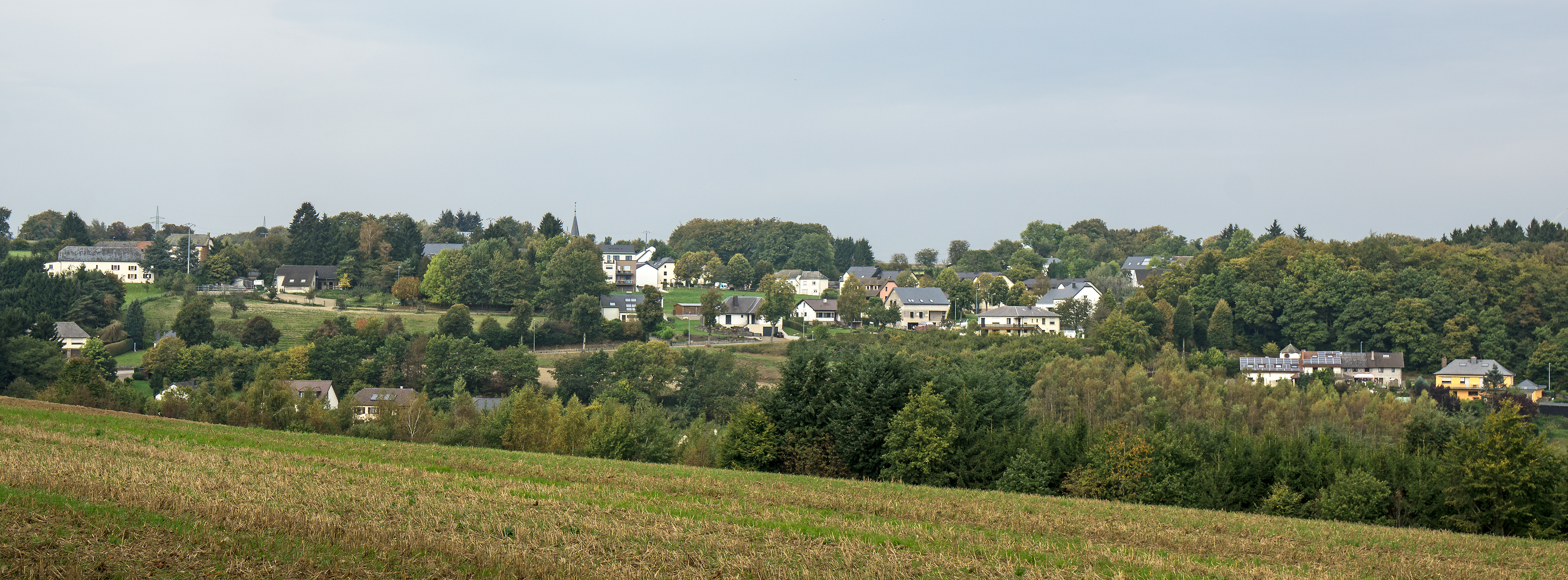
Eselborn seen from the CR322C

Eselborn (German pronunciation: [ˈeːzl̩ˌbɔʁn]; Luxembourgish: Eeselbur) is a small town in the commune of Clervaux, in northern Luxembourg. As of September 2026, the town has a population of 539.
