= Urspelt =

Coordinates: 50.0747°N 6.0454°E

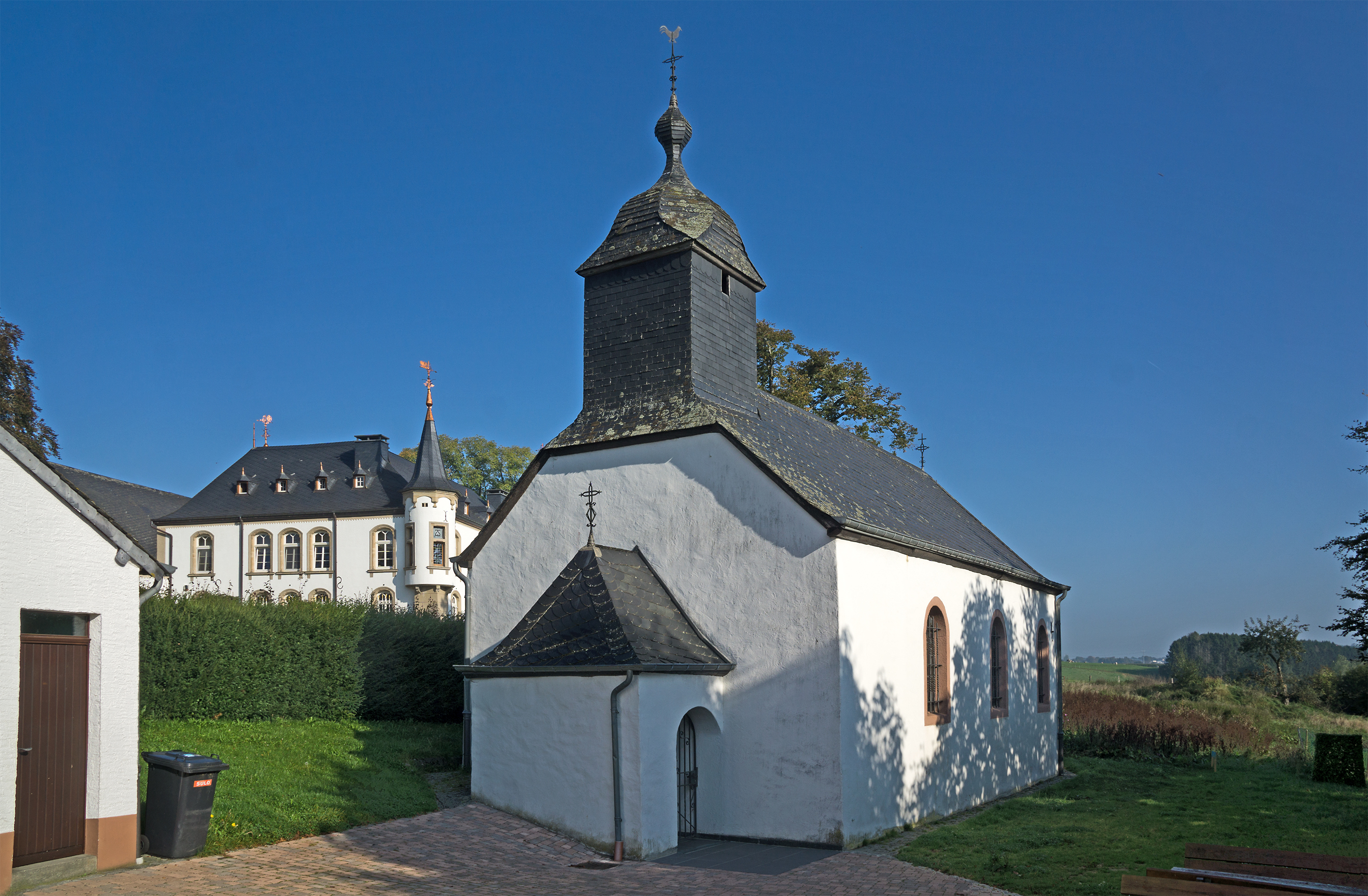
Chapel of Urspelt

Urspelt (Luxembourgish: Ischpelt) is a locality in the commune of Clervaux, in northern Luxembourg. As of September 2026, the village has a population of 183.

Urspelt Castle has a history going back at least three centuries but today's building dates from 1860. After comprehensive restoration work and additions, it recently opened as a hotel and meeting centre.
