= Hupperdange =

Village in Clervaux, Luxembourg

Coordinates: 50°06′N 6°04′E

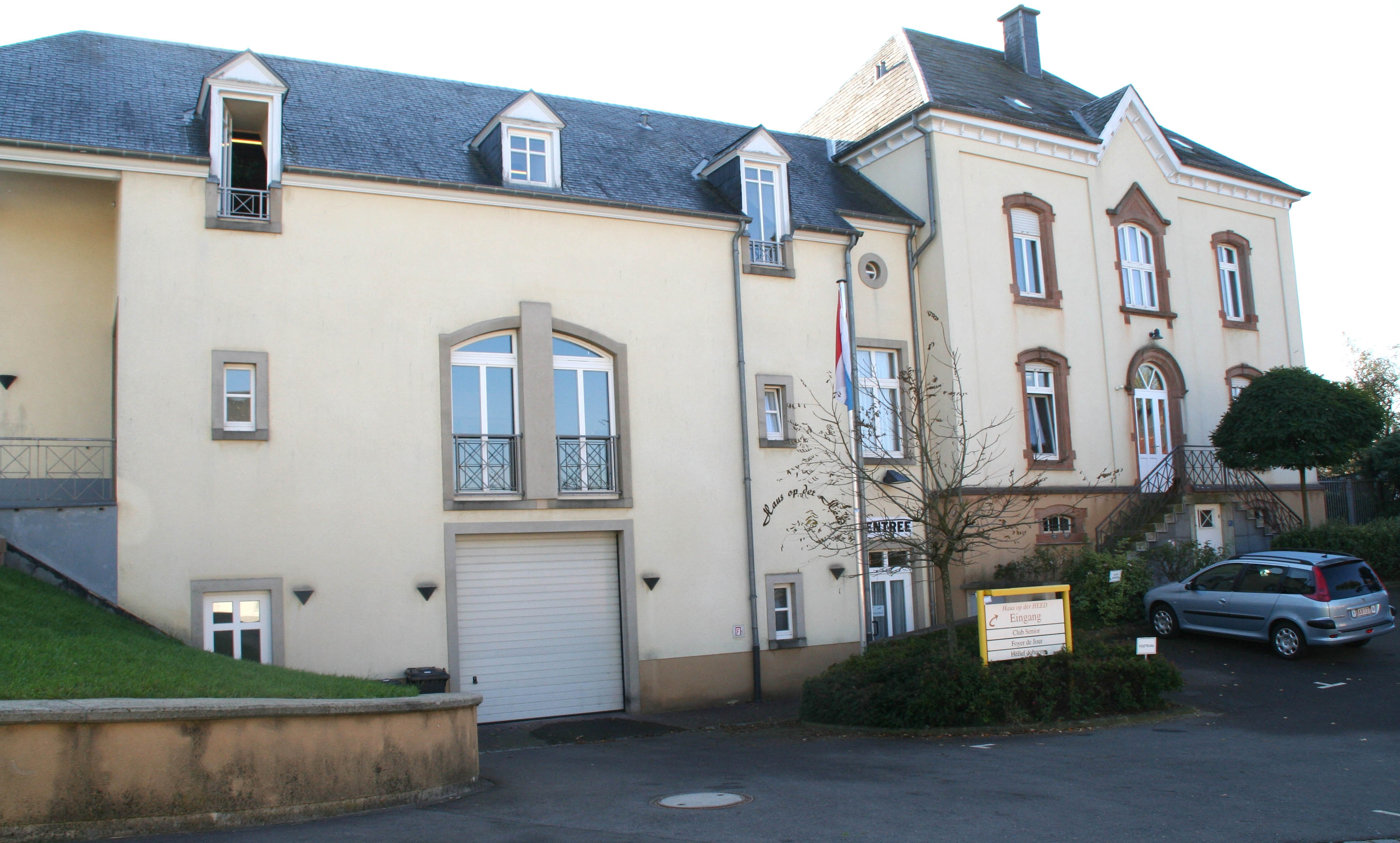
Building in Hupperdange

Hupperdange (Luxembourgish: Hëpperdang, German: Hüpperdingen) is a village in the commune of Clervaux, in northern Luxembourg. As of September 2026, the village has a population of 394.
