= Lieler =

Coordinates: 50°07′N 6°07′E

Lieler (German pronunciation: [ˈliːlɐ]; Luxembourgish: Léiler) is a village in the commune of Clervaux, in northern Luxembourg. As of September 2026, the village had a population of 444.
