= Marnach =

Coordinates: 50°03′N 6°04′E

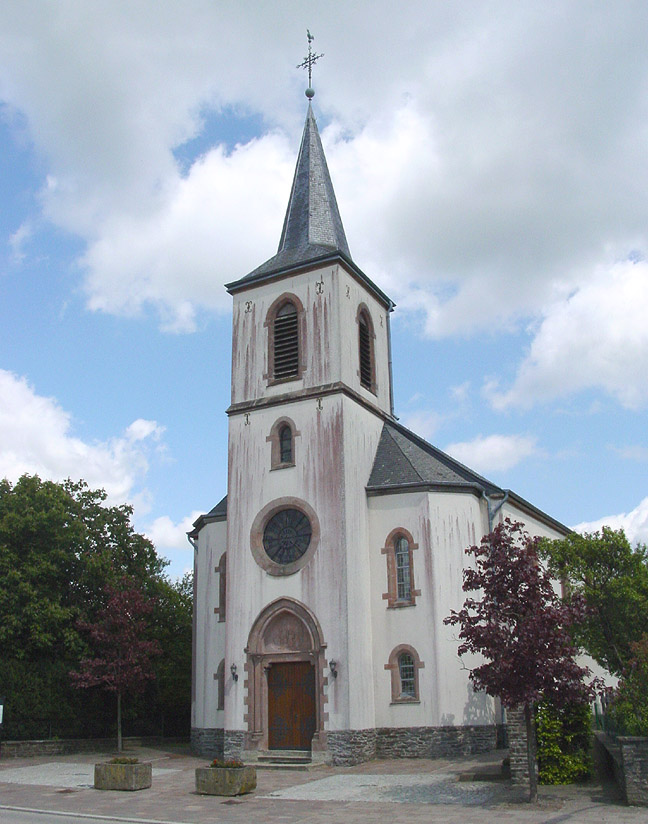
Marnach church

Marnach (Luxembourgish: Maarnech) is a small town in the commune of Clerf, in northern Luxembourg. As of 2026, the town has a population of 803. Near Marnach is the site of the transmitter of Radio Luxembourg.

The parish church of St Josef and St Martin was built in 1888 to the plans of the architect Jean-Pierre Knepper, in the neo-Gothic style.
