= Roder =

Coordinates: 50°03′N 6°05′E

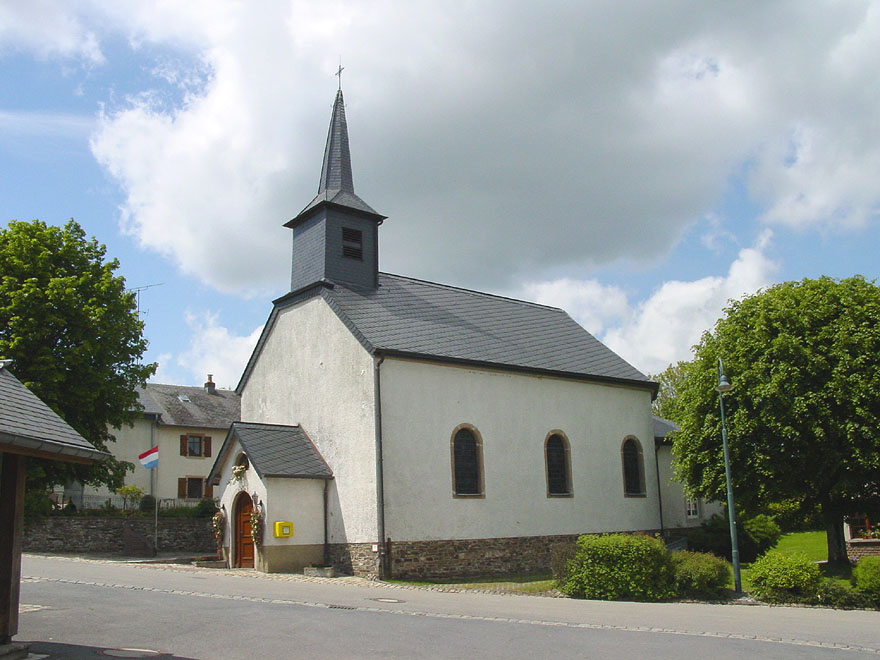
Roder church

Roder (German pronunciation: [ˈʁoːdɐ]; Luxembourgish: Rueder) is a village in the commune of Munshausen, in northern Luxembourg. As of September 2026, the village has a population of 82.
