= Siebenaler =

Coordinates: 50°01′N 6°02′E

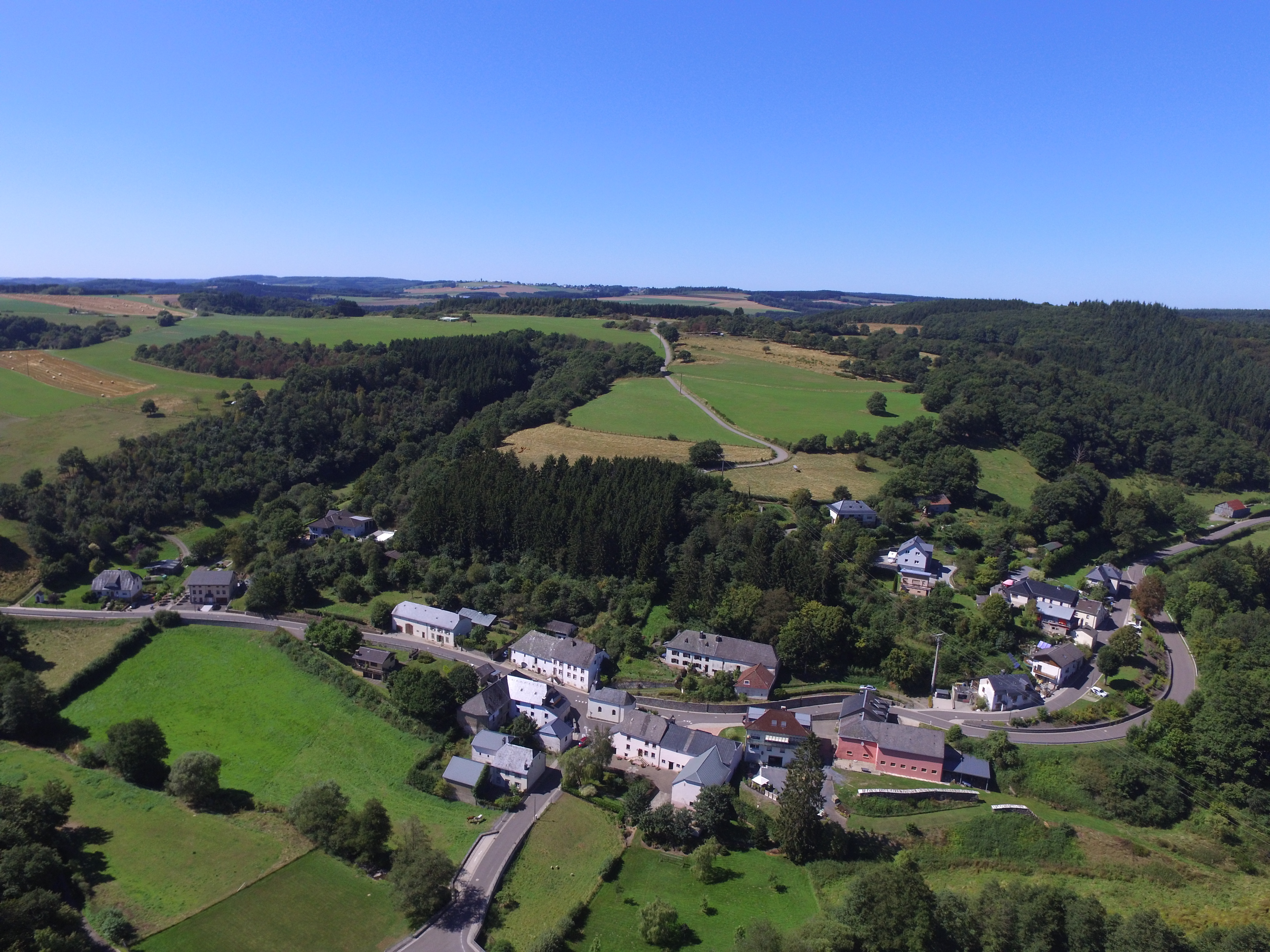
A photo of Siebenaler from a drone

Siebenaler (Luxembourgish: Siwwenaler) is a village in the commune of Clervaux, in northern Luxembourg. As of September 2026, the village has a population of 50.
