= Kalborn =

Coordinates: 50°06′N 6°07′E

Kalborn (Luxembourgish: Kaalber) is a village in the commune of Heinerscheid, in northern Luxembourg. As of September 2026, the village has a population of 60.

On 22 September 1944 a German patrol (often said to be SS, but it now appears to have been Wehrmacht) murdered seven male civilians in the village.
