= European School, Luxembourg II =

- Schola Europaea

Location
- 6, rue Gaston Thorn; Bertrange, L-1115; Luxembourg
- Coordinates: 49°37′04″N 6°02′06″E

Information
- Type: European School
- Established: 2004
- Operated by: The European Schools
- Director: Aibhistin O’Coimin (Ireland)
- Gender: Mixed
- Age range: 4 to 18
- Enrolment: 2,780 (2023-24)
- Student Union/Association: The Pupils' Committee
- Sister Schools: 12 European Schools
- Diploma: European Baccalaureate
- Website: www.eel2.eu

The European School, Luxembourg II (ESL2) is a European School, located on the border of the communes of Bertrange and Mamer in Luxembourg. Founded in 2004, the school prioritises, for enrolment purposes, pupils of EU staff based nearby. It is an all-through school, which offers a multilingual, multicultural education to its pupils, leading to the European Baccalaureate as its secondary leaving qualification.

== History ==
By 2004, the European School, Luxembourg I (ESL1) had reached oversubscription. Compounding matters, in May 2004, the so-called "Big Bang" enlargement of the European Union (EU), saw it grow from 15 to 25 member states. All such acceding states signed, and later, subsequently ratified the Convention Defining the Statue of the European Schools over the next 2 years, obligating the European Schools' to provide an education to pupils of EU staff and officials of their respective nationalities. In order to alleviate issues, the Board of Governors of the European Schools and the Luxembourg government, decided to open a second European School in Luxembourg, operating from September 2004.

The European School, Luxembourg II opened in a phased manner, with only the primary and nursery cycles operating between 2004 and 2012. The nursery school shared the existing nursery buildings of ESL1 on its Kirchberg campus, whilst the primary school was located in a temporary structure, the "Village Pédagogique", on rue Richard Coudenhove-Kalergi, opposite the nursery.

Construction on the current ESL2 campus located on the border of the communes of Bertrange and Mamer began in 2009. The school moved into its new premises in September 2012, and the secondary cycle began to operate.

In 2013, the school marked the first anniversary of its new campus with a hot air balloon launch.

In April 2026, Maurice Van Daal stepped down as director due to health issues. Since then, deputy director Aibhistin O'Coimin has served as acting director.

== Language sections ==
Committed to the multilingual and multicultural ethos and curriculum of the European Schools, both ESL1 and ESL2 are divided into language sections, with both schools having English, French and German sections. In addition to these, ESL2 comprises Czech, Slovak, Danish, Greek, Italian, and Hungarian sections.

Students enrolled in the schools are generally instructed in the language of their respective section. Students must choose from either English, French or German for their second language, which becomes the language of instruction for History and Geography curriculum from the third-year secondary, as well as the optional Economics course available from fourth year. Students are also expected to take a third language upon entering the secondary cycle. Students whose mother-tongue is not covered by a language section, are enrolled in the English, French or German sections, and can opt for their mother-tongue in place of English, French or German studies, respectively.

Both ESL1 and ESL2 differ in the languages they provide support for. Pupils enrolling in the European School system in Luxembourg are automatically enrolled in ESL1 if their mother-tongue is either Bulgarian, Dutch, Estonian, Finnish, Latvian, Lithuanian, Polish, Portuguese, Spanish, or Swedish. Meanwhile, all pupils of the following mother tongues are automatically enrolled in ESL2: Czech, Danish, Greek, Hungarian, Italian, Maltese, Romanian, Slovene, Slovak and Croatian. Supplementary Irish language classes are available in both schools for Irish pupils enrolled in the English sections.

== Campus and facilities ==
The school campus, with a capacity of 3,000 students, has a total of six buildings. It has five sport halls and two swimming pools, with at least one of the pools being 75 metres (246 ft) long. The administrative building houses the 75-metre-long pool, conference rooms, cafeterias, a dining hall, and examination rooms. The campus also houses a "children's hall" that includes a study area, and a crèche.

== Transport ==
The campus is bordered by a railway line, CFL Line 50, to its southwest, with Mamer-Lycée railway station being located on the line just west of the school campus.

A bypass road and flyover, connected to the north of the campus, provides direct access to the campus from the N6.

A school bus stop is present on the campus, which provides access to school bus services run by the schools' Parents' Association, as well as public bus services.

=== Issues ===
Following the school's relocation to its current campus, in June 2012, a protest was organised by some parents of pupils crItical of the extended commuting times for students and parents based in, or with better transport connections to, the school's previous campus in Kirchberg.

In 2013 parents reported having to pay 100 extra euros per child for the monthly school bus fee, due to the failure of the Luxembourg government to provide a promised subsidy for students with private sector-employed parents that would offset transport expenses.

== In popular culture ==
In season 1, episode 6 of the Amazon Prime Video series "Patriot", during a scene set in Luxembourg, Michael Chernus' character can be seen boarding a double-decker "22a" bus heading towards "Bertrange - École Européenne II", with Michael Dorman's character in pursuit. However, with the series' exterior Luxembourg shots mostly filmed in Prague, neither the model of bus nor the depicted bus route are accurate. (Note: Luxembourg City exclusively uses single-decker (including articulated) vehicles for public transportation, "16" and "11" (lb) are the City bus lines for the European School, Luxembourg II.)

== See also ==
- European School
- European Schools
