= Mamer (disambiguation) =

Mamer may refer to:

== People ==
=== Given name ===
- Mamer (musician) (born 1970), Chinese musician
- Joseph Mamer Manot, South Sudanese bishop

=== Surname ===
- Louisan E. Mamer (1910–2005), American home economist
- Nick Mamer (1897–1938), American aviator

== Places ==
- Kani Mamer, village in Iran
- Mamer, village in Luxembourg

== See also ==
- Mamer Lycée
