= Holzem =

Town in Mamer, Luxembourg

Coordinates: 49°37′N 5°59′E

Holzem church built in 1785

Holzem (Luxembourgish pronunciation: [ˈholtsəm]) is a small town in the commune of Mamer, in southwestern Luxembourg. As of September 2026, it has a population of 764. Holzem still has a distinctly rural atmosphere but in recent years a number of small companies have been established there.

== Location ==
Holzem is situated on the Mamer river 3 km (2 mi) west of Mamer to which it is connected by the CR 101 road. Unlike neighbouring Mamer and Capellen which both lie on Roman roads, Holzem has always been a quiet agricultural community. The PC 13 cycle track from Kleinbettingen to Strassen passes through Holzem.

== History ==
Holzem's history appears to date back to the 5th century when Franks occupied the area. The first written references are to be found in documents drafted in 1023 for Emperor Henry II (1000–1024) which refer to Hulcinesheim and Hukinesheim meaning the home of the Hulcin family. In 1428, a document from Luxembourg's magistrates informed Munster Abbey that Claes and Johann Hentzenson of Holtzem as serfs of the abbey are to be relieved of taxes. During the Thirty Years' War, Holzem like many other villages in Luxembourg, suffered under the Croats with a reduction in population from about 80 in 1635 to only about 30 in 1659. In 1684, during the Siege of Luxembourg, Marshall Créqui transported the inhabitants of Holzem to Longwy. Today's church was built in 1785 although regular services had already been held for many years in Holzem's chapel. Indeed, back in 1528, the Mamer priest had been instructed to hold mass in Holzem every Sunday.

Holzem: now attracting small companies

== Economy ==
Farming is now of secondary importance in Holzem as manufacturing and service companies have increasingly become established to the north of the town along the Route de Capellen. Activities range from woodworking and building materials to precision tools and industrial valves. There is also a supplier of large-scale heating, plumbing and alarm systems as well as one or two smaller companies in management and IT services.

== Facilities and services ==
Holzem has few local facilities apart from a Chinese restaurant, a café and a modern Salle des Fêtes which serves as a meeting place, concert hall and exhibition centre. There is a regular bus service to Mamer and Luxembourg. The A6 motorway from Luxembourg to Brussels can be joined at Mamer.

== Famous people ==
- Paul Alexander Weicker (1893–1983), author, journalist and businessman.
