= Mamer railway station =

Railway station in Luxembourg

Coordinates: 49°37′27″N 06°00′59″E

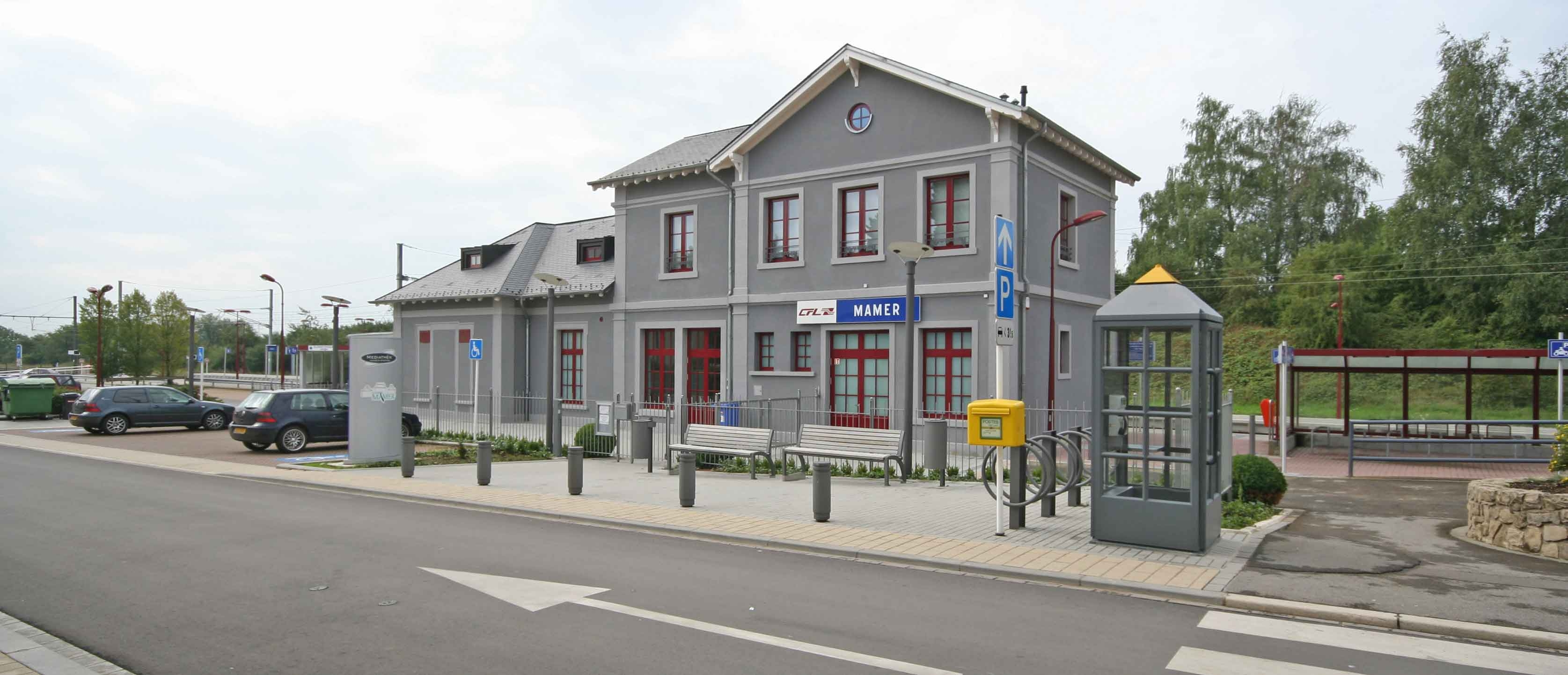
The station

Mamer railway station (Luxembourgish: Gare Mamer, French: Gare de Mamer, German: Bahnhof Mamer) is a railway station serving Mamer, in south-western Luxembourg. It is operated by Chemins de Fer Luxembourgeois, the state-owned railway company.

The station is situated on Line 50, which connects Luxembourg City to the west of the country and the Belgian town of Arlon. It is a station close to both the European School of Luxembourg II, but also Lycée Technique Josy Barthel. It is therefore busy with students in the mornings.

| Preceding station | CFL | Following station |
|---|---|---|
| Mamer-Lycée towards Luxembourg | Line 50 | Capellen towards Arlon |
