= Capellen railway station =

Railway station in southwestern Luxembourg

Coordinates: 49°38′19″N 05°58′55″E

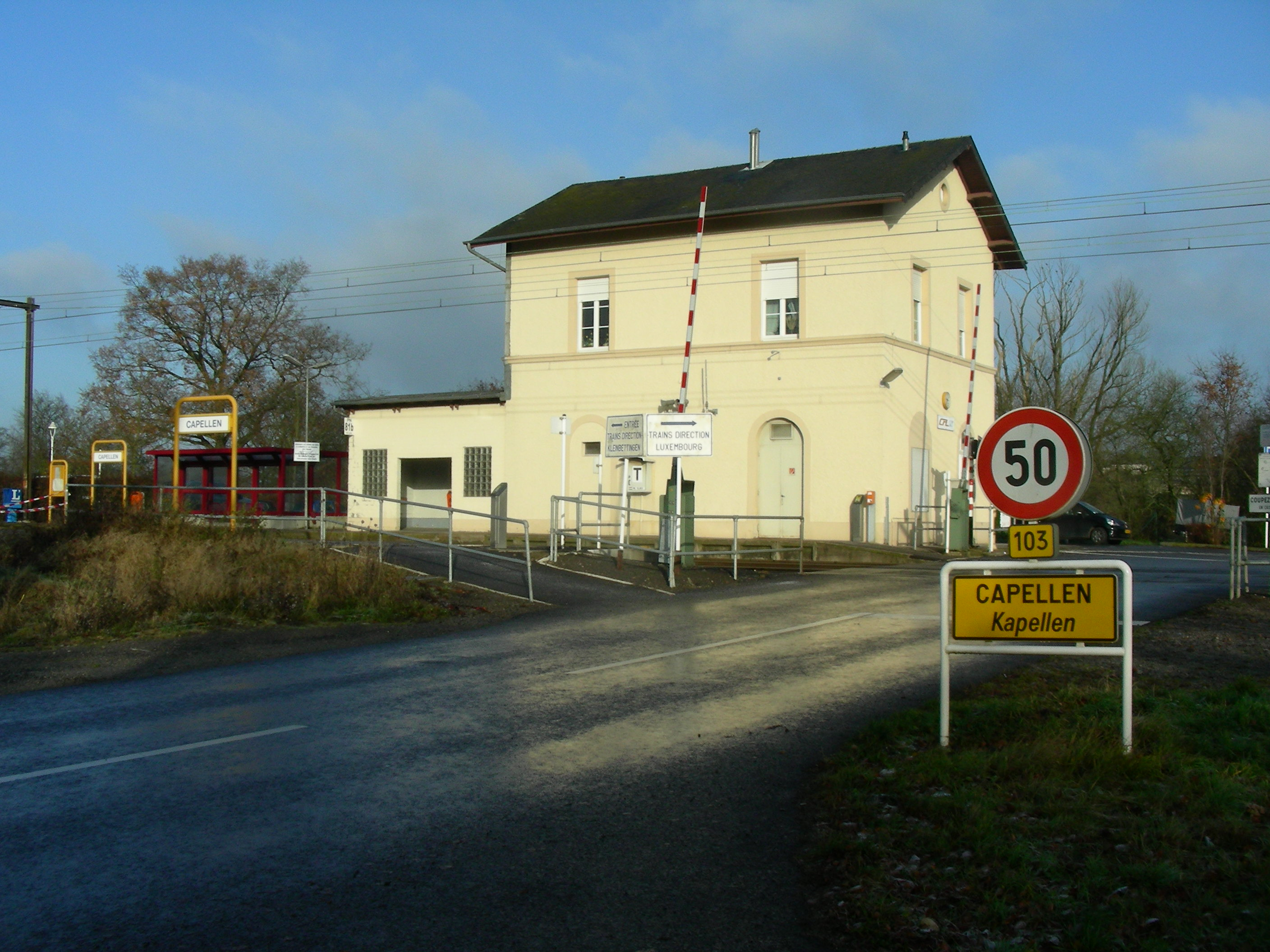
Capellen railway station

Capellen railway station (Luxembourgish: Gare Capellen, French: Gare de Capellen, German: Bahnhof Capellen) is a railway station serving Capellen, in the commune of Mamer, in south-western Luxembourg. It is operated by Chemins de Fer Luxembourgeois, the state-owned railway company.

The station is situated on Line 50, which connects Luxembourg City to the west of the country and the Belgian town of Arlon. It lies to the south of Capellen, close to the NAMSA site, on the road from Capellen to Holzem.

== Gallery ==
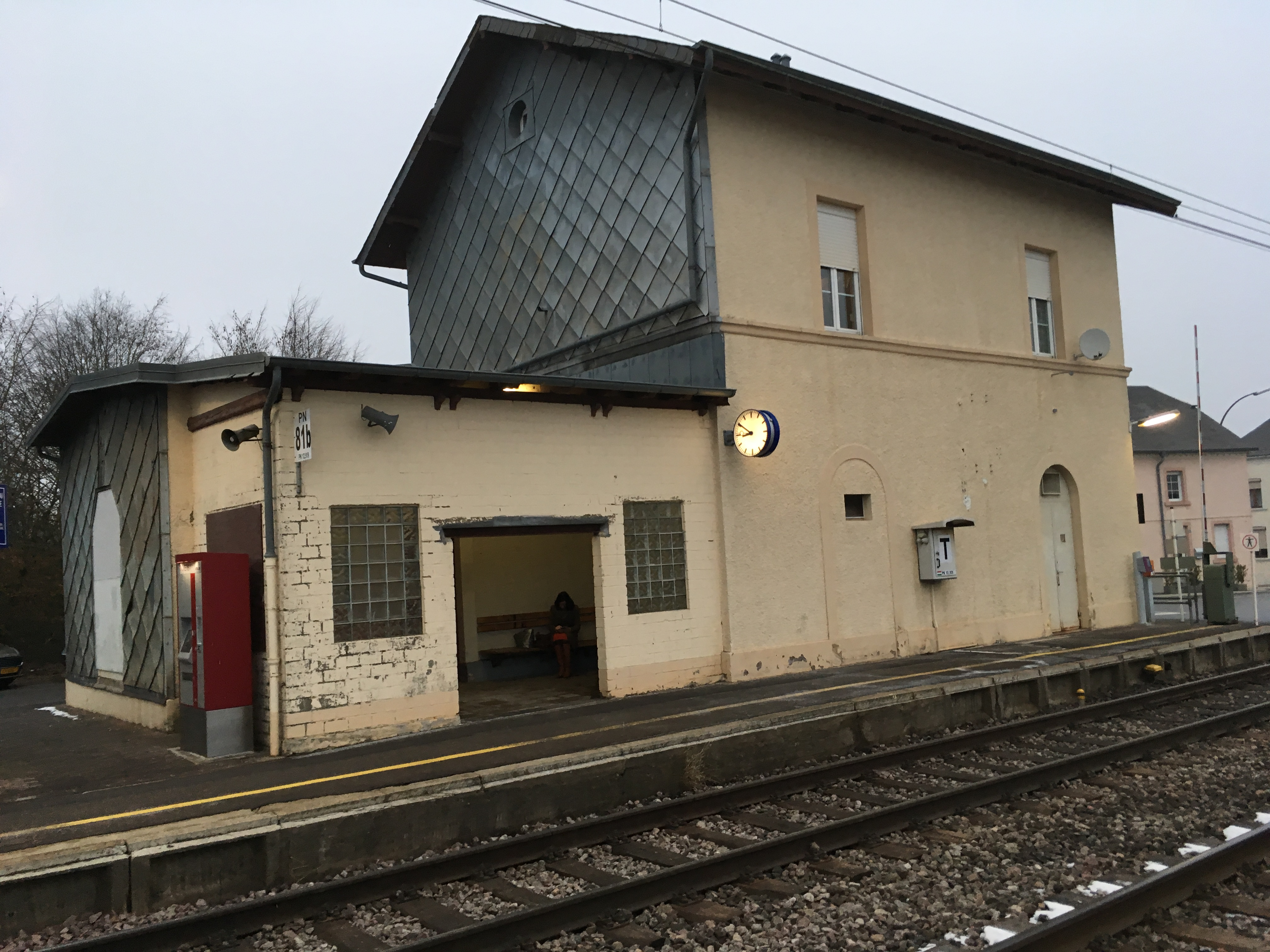

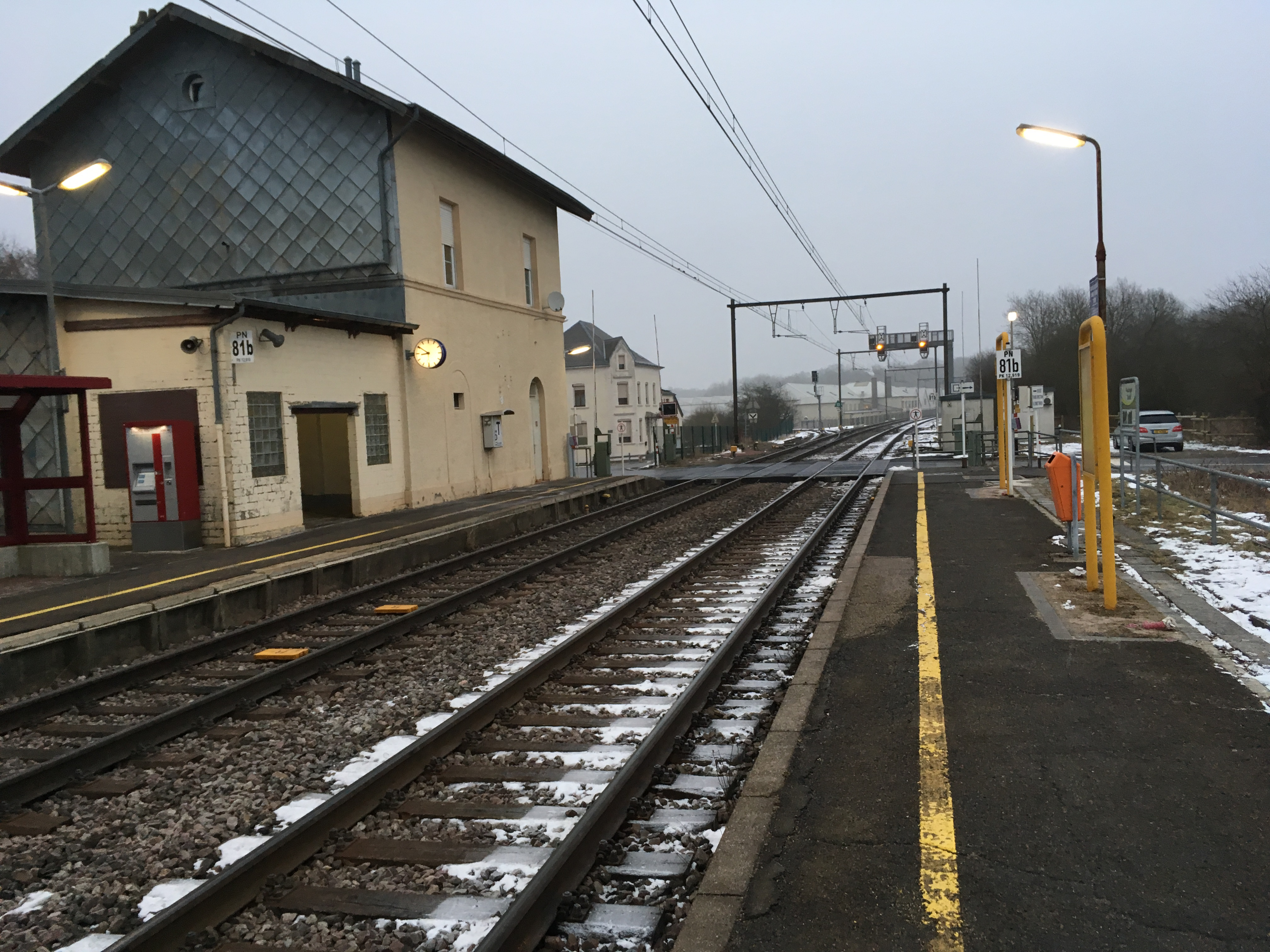

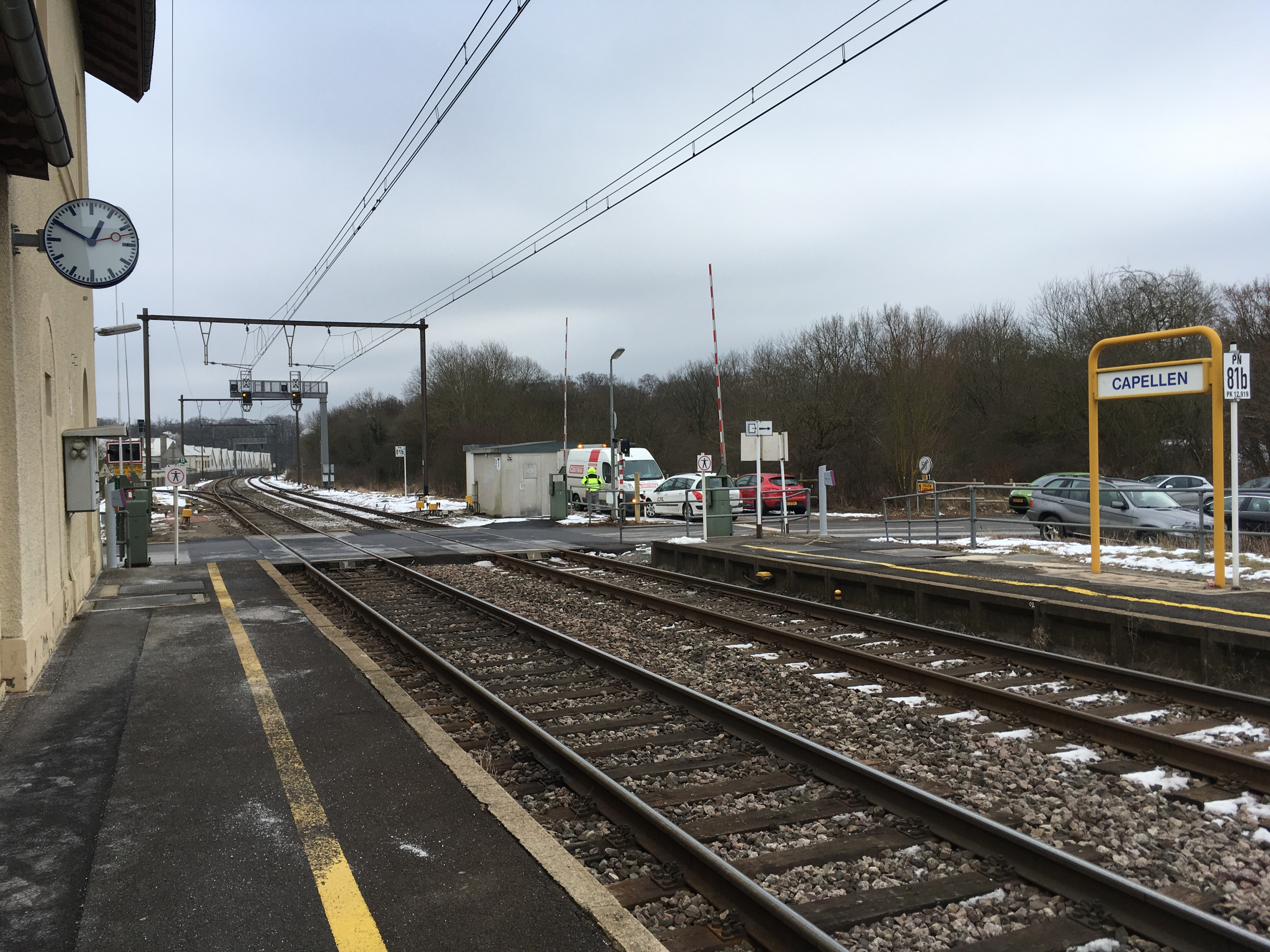

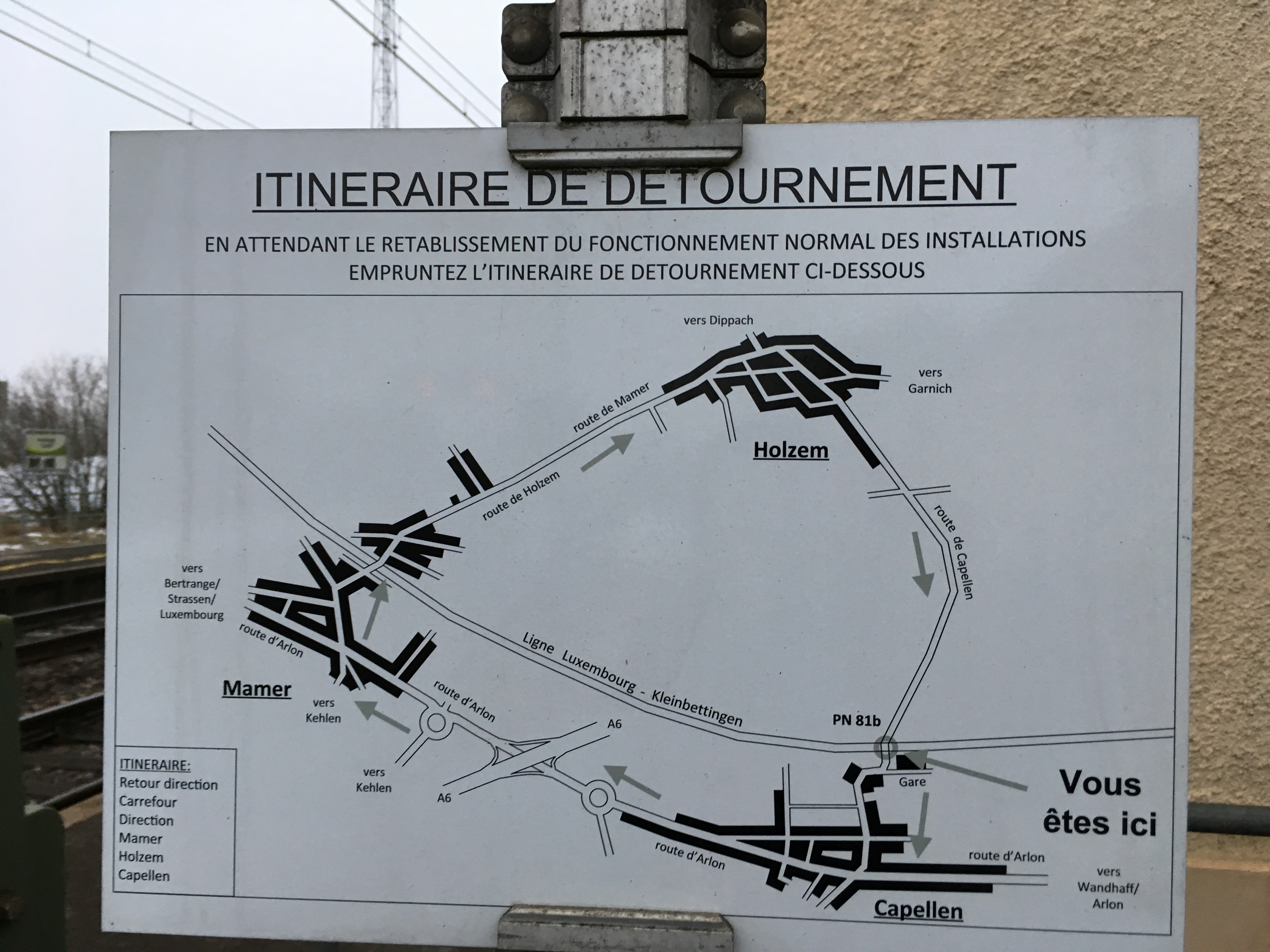

Preceding station	CFL	Following station
Mamer towards Luxembourg	Line 50	Kleinbettingen towards Arlon
