= Jim Clemes =

Luxembourgish architect (born 1957)

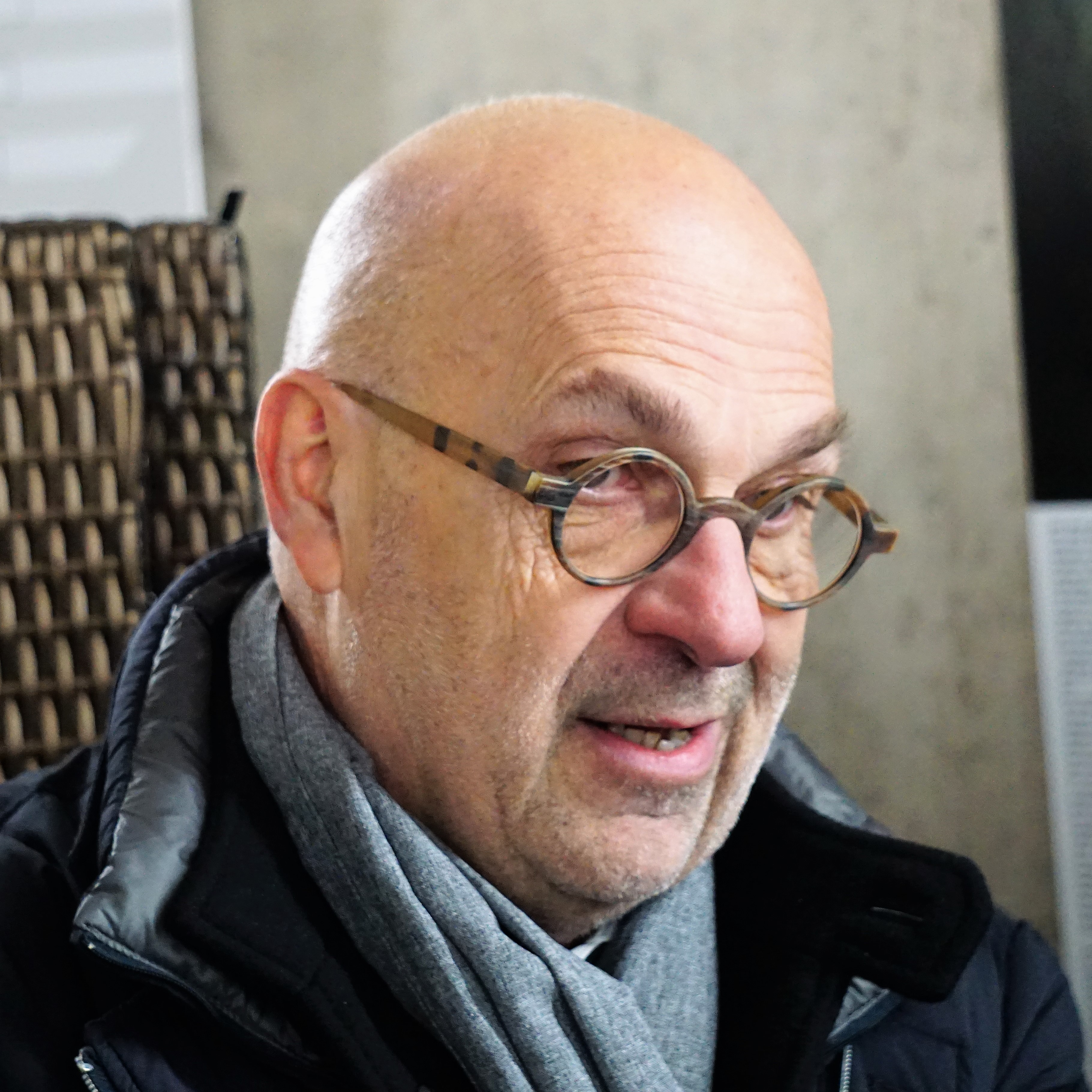
Clemes in 2018

Jean-Marie "Jim" Clemes (born 29 July 1957) is a Luxembourgish architect who founded the Esch-sur-Alzette firm Atelier d’Architecture et de Design Jim Clemes in 1984. He and his firm have designed several modern Luxembourg buildings and are also involved in town planning initiatives.

== Biography ==
Jean-Marie "Jim" Clemes was born on 29 July 1957 in Luxembourg City, and attended the Lycée des Garçons in Esch-sur-Alzette. He graduated in environmental design at Miami University, Oxford, Ohio and in architecture at the École Spéciale d'Architecture in Paris. Before founding his own firm in 1984, he worked for Luxembourg's Services des Sites et Monuments Nationaux. Clemes' Atelier d'Architecture et de Design now employs 55 architects, engineers, technicians and support staff.

== Works ==
His design work has included:

- Banque Générale du Luxembourg building, Boulevard Royal, Luxembourg City;
- Centre de Conférences Provisoire (temporary conference centre) at Luxexpo, Luxembourg City, winner of the 2004 Prix luxembourgeois d'architecture;
- Centre Hospitalier Emile Mayrisch, Esch-sur-Alzette.
- Belval-Université railway station, Esch-sur-Alzette;
- Melia Hotel, Luxembourg City.
- Kinneksbond Cultural Centre, Mamer.

Clemes was also associated with the design of Les Thermes waterpark in Bertrange, Luxembourg, and was involved in a town planning project for Differdange, Luxembourg.
