= Johann Dietenberger =

German theologian

Johann Dietenberger, OP (c. 1475 – September 4, 1537) was a German Counter Reformation-era Scholastic and theologian. He was canon and inquisitor-general of Mentz and Cologne.

== Biography ==
Dietenberger was born at Frankfurt-am-Main; his father was a cooper from Diedenbergen. He was educated in his native city, and joined the Dominican Order. In 1510, he was first elected prior of his convent, an office he would retain nearly uninterrupted until 1526. On 3 June 1511, Dietenberger registered at Cologne as a theological student. There he received instruction from figures including Jacob van Hoogstraaten, Conrad Koellin, and Bernard of Luxemburg. In 1512, he spent some time at Heidelberg, where he studied under Michael Vehe. On 23 September 1514, he was admitted to the licentiate at the University of Mainz, and in 1515 he received the doctor's degree.

Towards the end of 1517, Dietenberger was appointed Regens studiorum and interpreter of Thomas Aquinas at Trier, where he opened his lectures on 27 January 1518. He became regent there, and then briefly held the office of prior at Koblenz, until the Frankfurt town council petitioned for his return in 1520. That same year, Johann Cochlaeus became dean of Liebfrauen, and the two men became close friends and collaborators.

During the 1525 German Peasants' War, the Frankfurt town council claimed authority over the friary, and, on 25 April, Dietenberger submitted his resignation. He was nevertheless required to continue in his office until 27 October 1526, after which he left the monastery and traveled to Koblenz. There he became prior once more, holding the office until 1532.

In 1530, he accompanied Johann von Metzenhausen to the Diet of Augsburg. There, on 27 June, twenty Catholic theologians were selected to draw up a refutation to the Augsburg Confession. The group, headed by Johann Eck, included Dietenberger, Johann Faber, Johann Cochlaeus, Bartholomaeus Arnoldi, and Konrad Wimpina. Around the same time, Dietenberger was appointed general inquisitor for the dioceses of Mainz and Cologne.

His last years, from 1532, were devoted to teaching theology and exegesis in the Academy of Mainz. Like Martin Luther, Dietenberger translated the Bible into the vernacular German after consulting recently published Greek and Hebrew biblical texts, although Dietenberger's was true to the Latin Vulgate and the traditional teachings of the Roman Catholic Church. His translation of the Bible was published at Mentz in 1534, where he died three years later.

== Works ==
His catechism was:

- Evangelischer Bericht und Christliche Unterweisung der furnehmlichsten Stuck des waren heyligen Christlichen Glaubens, published first at Mainz in 1537 and often re-edited, lastly by Christoph Moufang (Die Mainzer Katechismen).

Dietenberger's German Bible translation:

- Biblia beider Allt und Newen Testamenten, new verdeutscht, published at Mainz in 1534. This work, repeatedly corrected, especially by Kaspar Ulenberg (Cologne, 1630) and the Jesuit theologians of Mainz (1661), was destined to become for the German people Die Katholische Bibel.

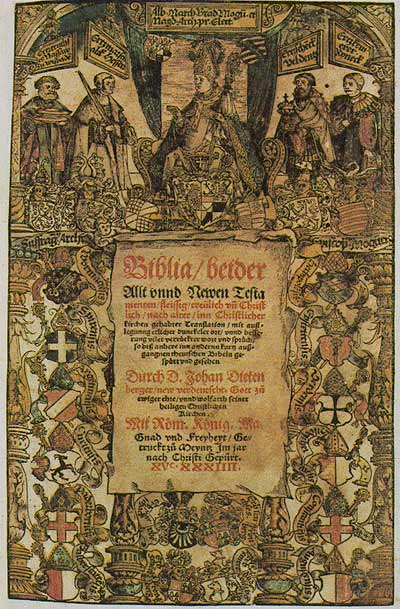
Mainz German Bible (1534), printed by Peter Jordan.

He used freely the New Testament of Emser (1527), of whom Martin Luther was wont to say that "he had ploughed with his heifers"; he used likewise other translations compiled in pre-Reformation times, and so did Luther. He was well acquainted with the versions of Luther and of Leo Jud, and used them to improve his own.

Dietenberger composed fifteen polemical tracts, treating various subjects then much mooted: Mass, confession, vows, faith, etc.
