= Bertrange-Strassen railway station =

Railway station in Luxembourg

Coordinates: 49°36′40″N 06°03′28″E

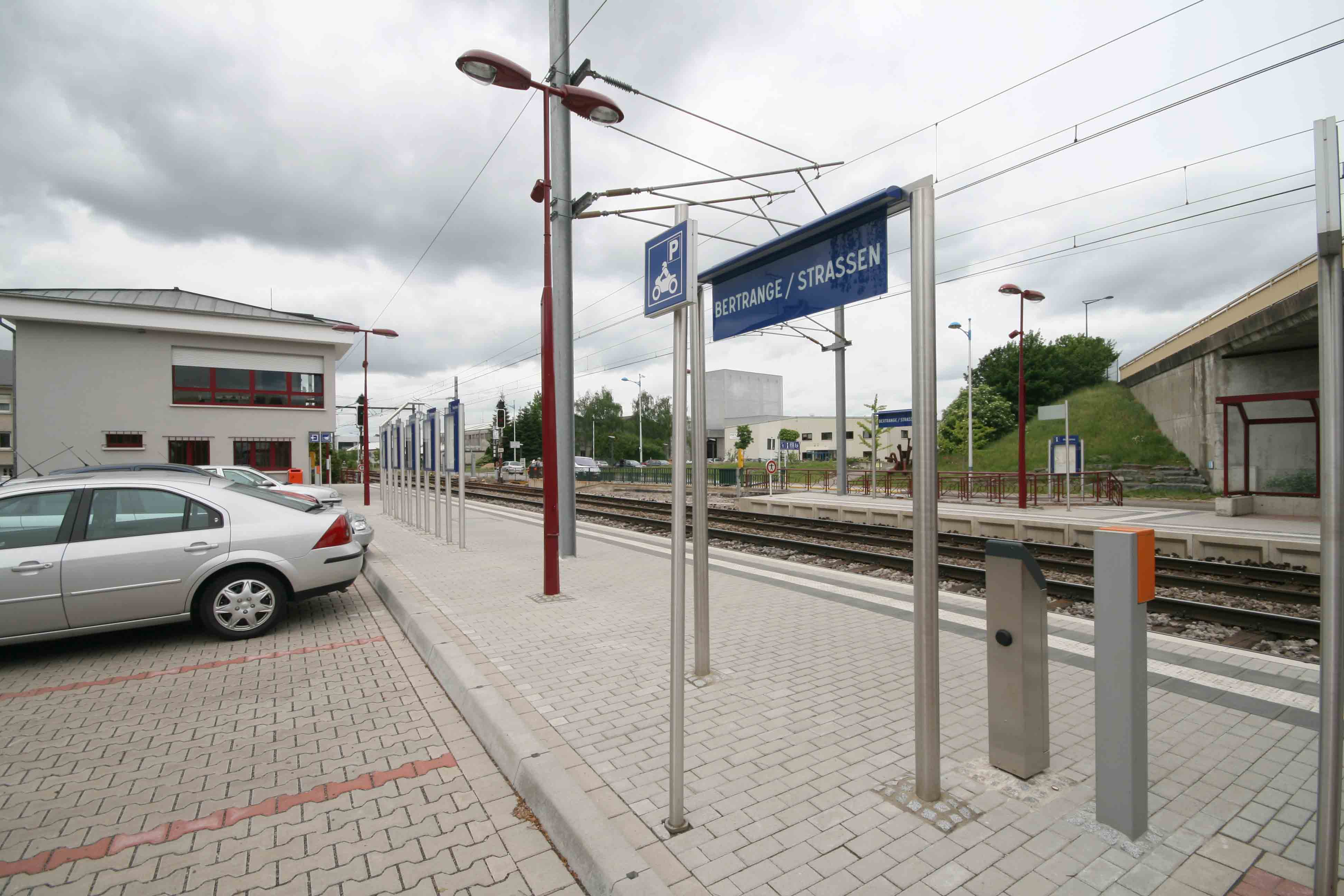
The station

Bertrange-Strassen railway station (Luxembourgish: Gare Bartreng-Stroossen, French: Gare de Bertrange-Strassen, German: Bahnhof Bertringen-Strassen) is a railway station in Bertrange, in south-western Luxembourg. It also serves the town of Strassen, which lies to the north. It is operated by Chemins de Fer Luxembourgeois, the state-owned railway company.

The station is situated on Line 50, which connects Luxembourg City to the west of the country and the Belgian town of Arlon.

Preceding station	CFL	Following station
Luxembourg Terminus	Line 50	Mamer-Lycée towards Arlon
