= Mamer Lycée =

Mamer-Lycée may refer to:

- Lycée Technique Josy Barthel, a school in Mamer, in south-western Luxembourg
- Mamer-Lycée railway station, a railway station serving the school
