= Capellen =

Town in Mamer, Luxembourg

Coordinates: 49°38′40″N 5°59′23″E

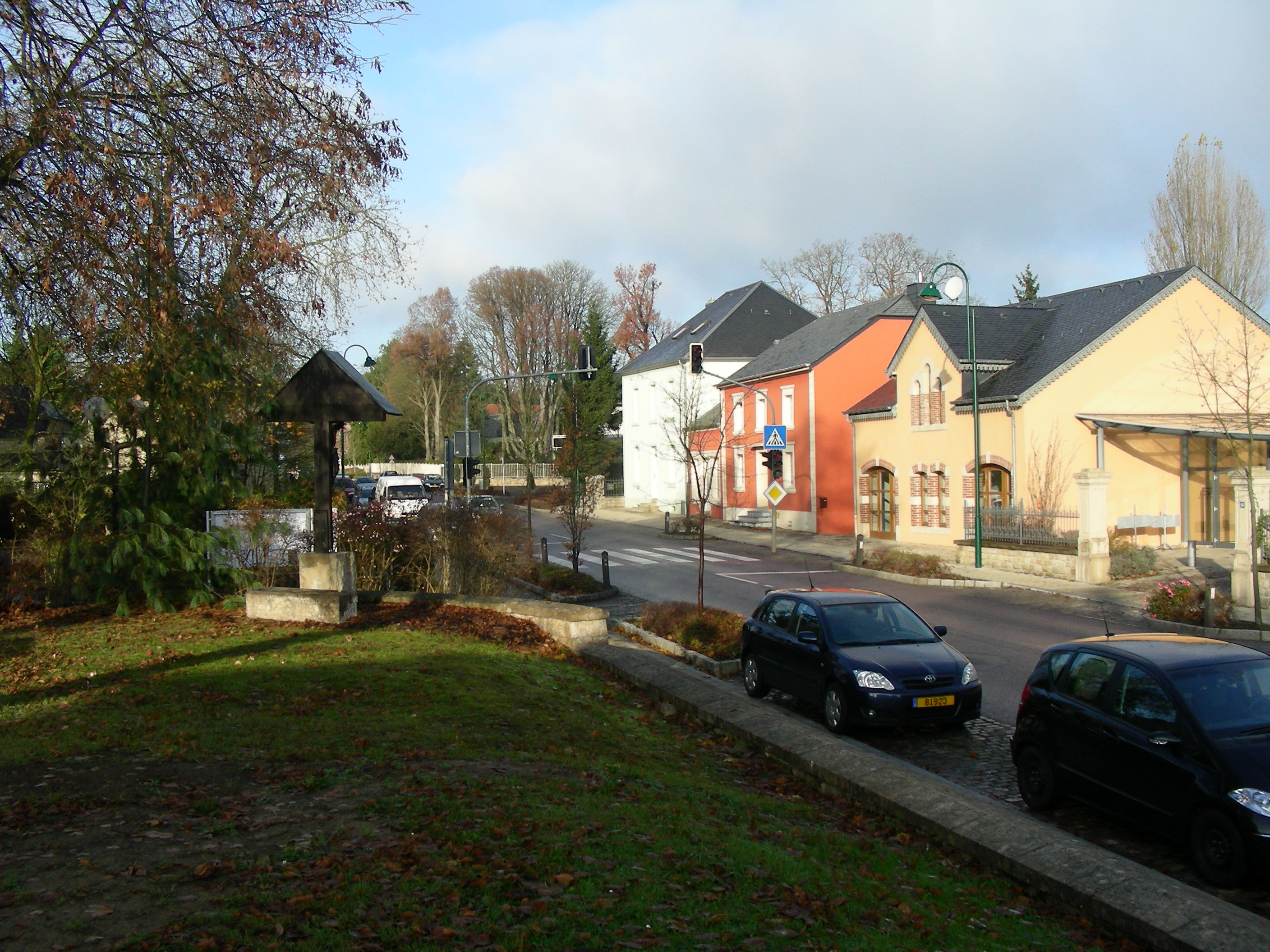
Capellen, Luxembourg: Road through the centre

Capellen (German pronunciation: [kaˈpɛlən]; Luxembourgish: Cap/Capellen [kɑˈpælən]) is a town in the commune of Mamer, in south-western Luxembourg, 12 km west of Luxembourg City. As of September 2026, the town has a population of 2,575. Despite not having a commune named after it, Capellen lends its name to the canton of Capellen, and is the only town in Luxembourg to bear the latter distinction but not the former.

Capellen is home to the NATO Support and Procurement Agency (NSPA) which acts as the headquarters of NATO's Agencies. The site occupies a large part of the town south of the route d'Arlon. To the west of the NSPA complex is Capellen railway station, which lies on Chemins de Fer Luxembourgeois' Line 50.

The town is the site of one of the six regional headquarters of the Grand Ducal Police. A museum dedicated to police uniforms and accessories, both national and international, was opened in the town on 21 June 2007.

== History ==
Capellen lies on the old Roman road, today's Kiemwee, from Trier in Germany to Reims and Paris. Some years ago, a Roman milestone was found on the Kiem in the direction of Windhof to the west of Capellen. Furthermore, in 2002, beside the Roman road to the east, the remains of several Roman buildings and brick kilns (see below) were uncovered. These appear to date back to the 4th century.

The first reference to Capellen is to be found in the Koerich parish records from 1718 which state that five households reside in Auf der Kappe, soon to be known as Cap. In 1722, a new weekly stagecoach service from Luxembourg to Brussels passed through Cap. The road linking Luxembourg City to Brussels, passing through Capellen, was built in 1790. From 1796, Cap and Capellen came under the jurisdiction of Mamer.

When Luxembourg was divided into cantons in 1840, as a result of disputes between Mamer and Koerich, it was decided that the canton should be named Capellen and that Capellen should become its seat.

In 1859, the railway from Luxembourg to Brussels was opened, with a station in Capellen. American troops, liberating Luxembourg in September 1944, proceeded through Capellen towards Arlon along what became known as the Voie de la Liberté. In 1951, barracks for the Luxembourg army including the main vehicle depot were built to the south of the town. After the national draft was lifted in 1967, these facilities were taken over by NAMSA as a major NATO supply centre. Since the 1970s, Capellen has expanded rapidly, both as a residential town and, increasingly, a business and financial development area.

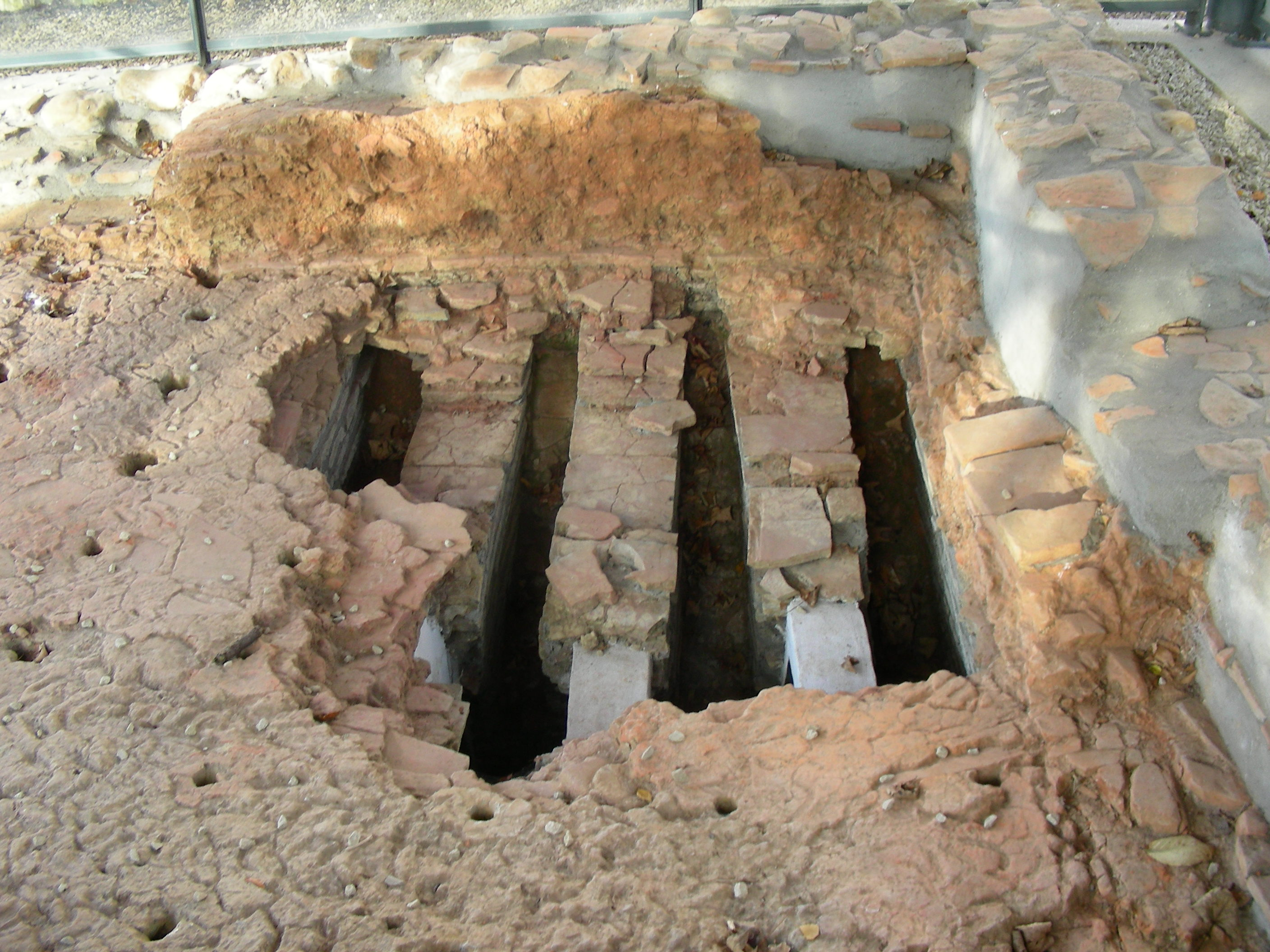
The Roman brick kiln in Capellen, Luxembourg

=== The Roman brick kiln ===
In 2002, while excavation work was in progress at the Parc d'Activités site to the east of Capellen, the remains of a Roman brick factory were discovered. With assistance from the National Museum of History and Art, archeologists from Nospelt belonging to the Georges Kayser Altertumsfuerscher uncovered a number of Roman buildings and kilns. One of the kilns was in remarkably good condition. As it was not possible to keep it in its original location, the Ministry of Culture and the Commune of Mamer decided it should be transferred to the centre of Capellen. After long and careful preparations, the kiln was moved to its new position in April 2003.

The brick kiln is of great historical interest as it shows that in the 4th century, the Romans were undertaking a considerable amount of construction work, probably under the direction of Constantine the Great who frequently resided in nearby Trier from 306 to 316. The site of the brick factory was on the Kiem (Latin caminus, road) or Roman road linking Trier to Reims only 4 km from the vicus of Mamer.

The kiln's new site, opposite the church on Route d'Arlon in the centre of Capellen, is open to the public.

== Capellen today ==
Capellen has prospered over the past 40 years, first as a result of the establishment of NAMSA with personnel from all the NATO countries, then as a residential area for those working in Luxembourg City. With the recent development of the Parc d'Activités, many financial and technology companies now have offices in Capellen. This has all led to the opening of a large supermarket, a new post office, a pharmacy and several restaurants in the locality. There is also a large community centre next to the church and primary school.

Capellen also hosts the Ligue HMC, an innovative association offering vocational training and employment for mentally disabled people.

There are frequent bus services to Luxembourg and to various locations to the west. The A6 motorway or European route E25 from Luxembourg to Brussels runs through Capellen.

== Economy ==
Capellen's largest employer by far is NSPA (ex NAMSA) with some 1000 employees. There are however well over 30 smaller companies providing some 1,200 jobs in a wide variety of areas including financial and technology services, pharmaceuticals, engineering, food and insurance.

== Famous people ==
- Paul Faber, born 1888 in Capellen: human rights advocate, member of the Permanent Arbitration Court in The Hague.
- Albert Steffen (1884–1962): Luxembourg historian and court cleric.
- Géza Wertheim ( 1910 – 1979) born in Capellen : tennis player and bobsledder.
- Nicolas Stoffel (1900–1988) founder of the Ligue HMC (1963) an association dedicated to integrate people with intellectual disabilities into society.
