= Kleinbettingen railway station =

Railway station in Luxembourg

Coordinates: 49°38′38″N 05°54′58″E

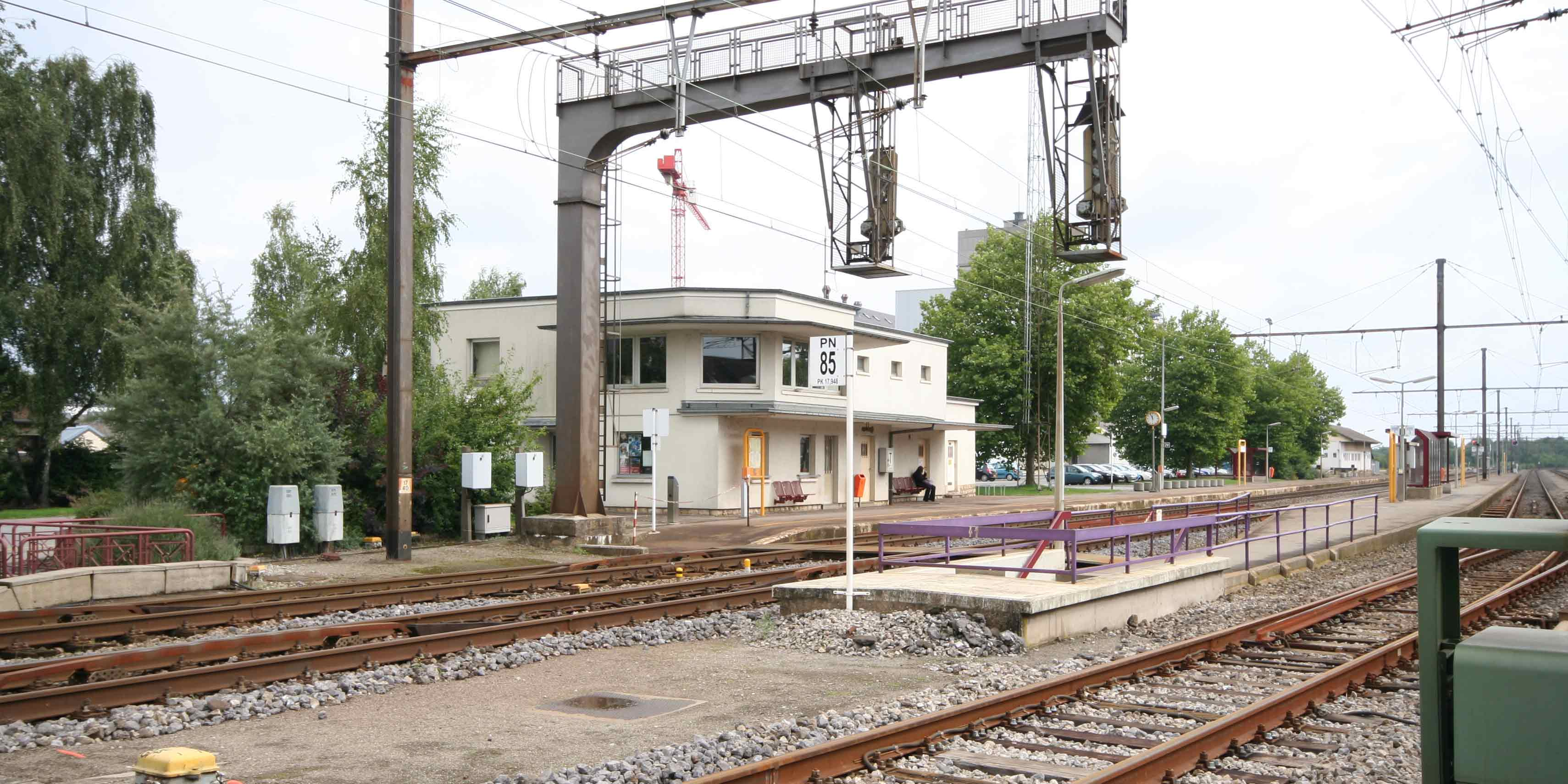
Kleinbettingen station

Kleinbettingen railway station (Luxembourgish: Gare Klengbetten, French: Gare de Kleinbettingen, German: Bahnhof Kleinbettingen) is a railway station serving Kleinbettingen, in the commune of Steinfort, in western Luxembourg. It is operated by Chemins de Fer Luxembourgeois, the state-owned railway company.

The station is situated on Line 50, which connects Luxembourg City to the west of the country and the Belgian town of Arlon.

Preceding station	CFL	Following station
Capellen towards Luxembourg	Line 50	Arlon Terminus
