= Les Thermes =

Water park in Luxembourg

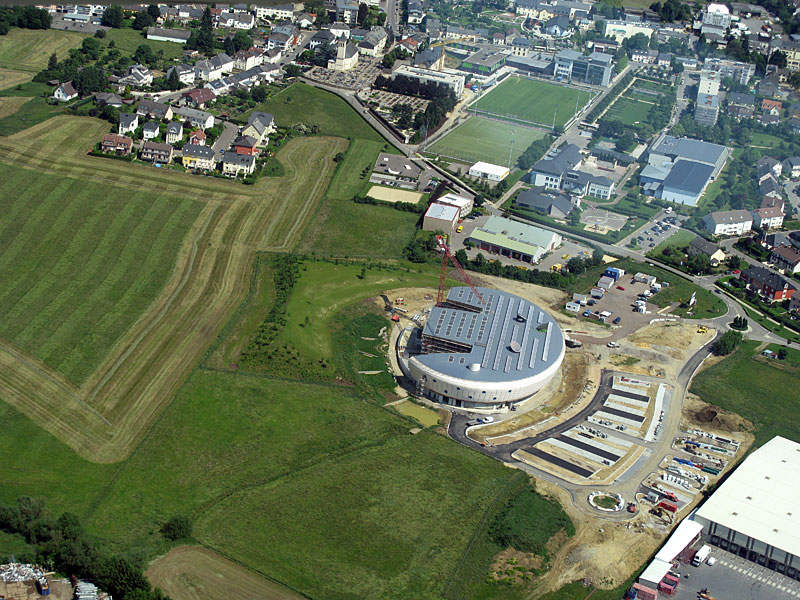
- Les Thermes
- Interactive map of Les Thermes
- Location: Strassen/Bertrange, Luxembourg
- Coordinates: 49.61397°N 6.070687°E
- Opened: February 2009

Les Thermes is a water park between Strassen and Bertrange, west of Luxembourg City, Luxembourg. Opened in February 2009, it attracted half a million visitors during its first year and has been named "Most Innovating Waterpark in Europe" by the European Waterpark Association based in Nuremberg, Germany.

== The complex ==
The facility consists of a 25 meters swimming pool, two children's pools, wave baths, slides, solarium, sauna and fitness centre. The award was based on its suitability for a wide range of visitors, its striking modern architecture and its well-conceived design uniting the pools, the changing rooms and the fitness centre.

Les Thermes, a joint enterprise of the communes of Bertrange and Strassen, was built at a cost of EUR 37 million.

== Design ==
After a competition, the firms chosen to design the complex were Witry & Witry, Jim Clemes Architectes and Hermann Valentiny & Associés. Sometimes compared to a spacecraft, the concrete building's shape is the result of its rounded wooden roof coupled with a rounded façade faced with aluminium strips. In addition to stainless steel swimming pools, the fitness and recreation areas are positioned over three levels. Large skylights on the roof ensure maximum use of sunlight in the building.

== Awards ==
At the Luxembourg Bauhärepräis competition in June 2012, Les Thermes was presented with the award for buildings designed for sport.
