= Mamer Castle =

Building in Mamer, Luxembourg

Coordinates: 49°37′34″N 06°01′26″E

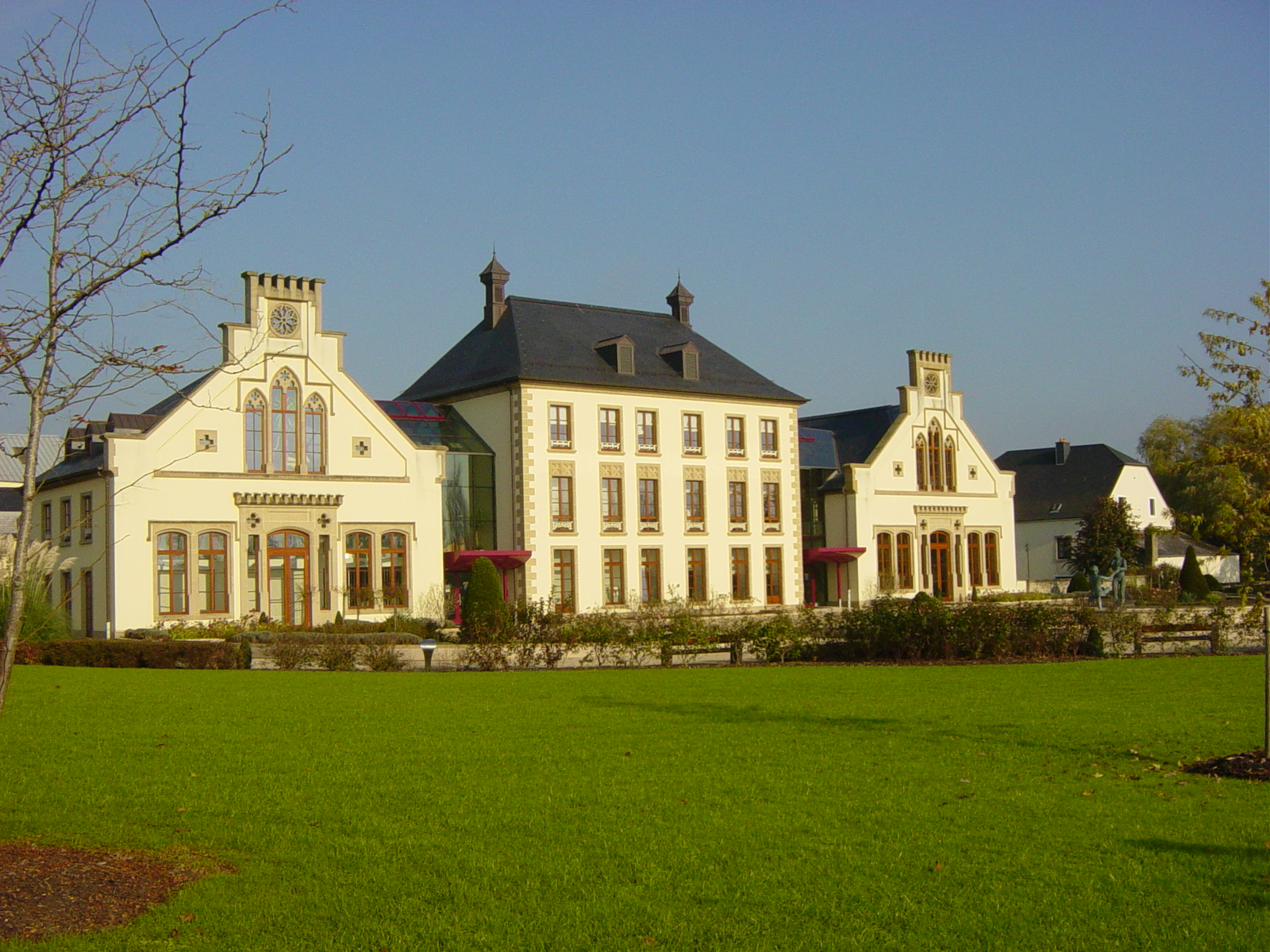
Mamer Castle serves as the commune's town hall and centre of communal services, having been recently restored, renovated, and landscaped.

Mamer Castle (Luxembourgish: Mamer Schlass, French: Château de Mamer, German: Mamer Schloss) is the town hall for the commune of Mamer, in south-western Luxembourg. It is the home of the communal council, the site of local government offices, and the centre of administration for communal services.

It is located on Place de l'Indépendance near the centre of the town. It is made up of four buildings, set in recently landscaped surroundings. At the main entrance, there is a sculpture of Nicolas Frantz, two-time Tour de France winner, and Josy Barthel, Luxembourg's only Olympic gold medallist, both of whom were born in Mamer.

== History ==
A castle was originally built in Mamer in the 10th century. By the French Revolutionary Wars, it had fallen into ruin, and was seized and sold off by the occupying French forces in 1798 to Thierry de Bastogne. Police chief Frederic François built a new castle on the site in 1830, surrounded by a 2-metre high wall. It passed hands to Jacques Fischer and Julie Kremer in 1934, surrounded by 1.72 hectares of farmland.

In 1995, the property was purchased by the communal administration, which, in 1997, voted unanimously on 4 June 1997 to restore it. This was done between September 1999 and February 2002. The communal administration has been located at Mamer Castle since 1 March 2002. Mamer Castle was the location of the draw for the 2006 UEFA European Under-17 Football Championship, which was held in Luxembourg.

== See also ==
- List of castles in Luxembourg
