= Mamer =

- Commune
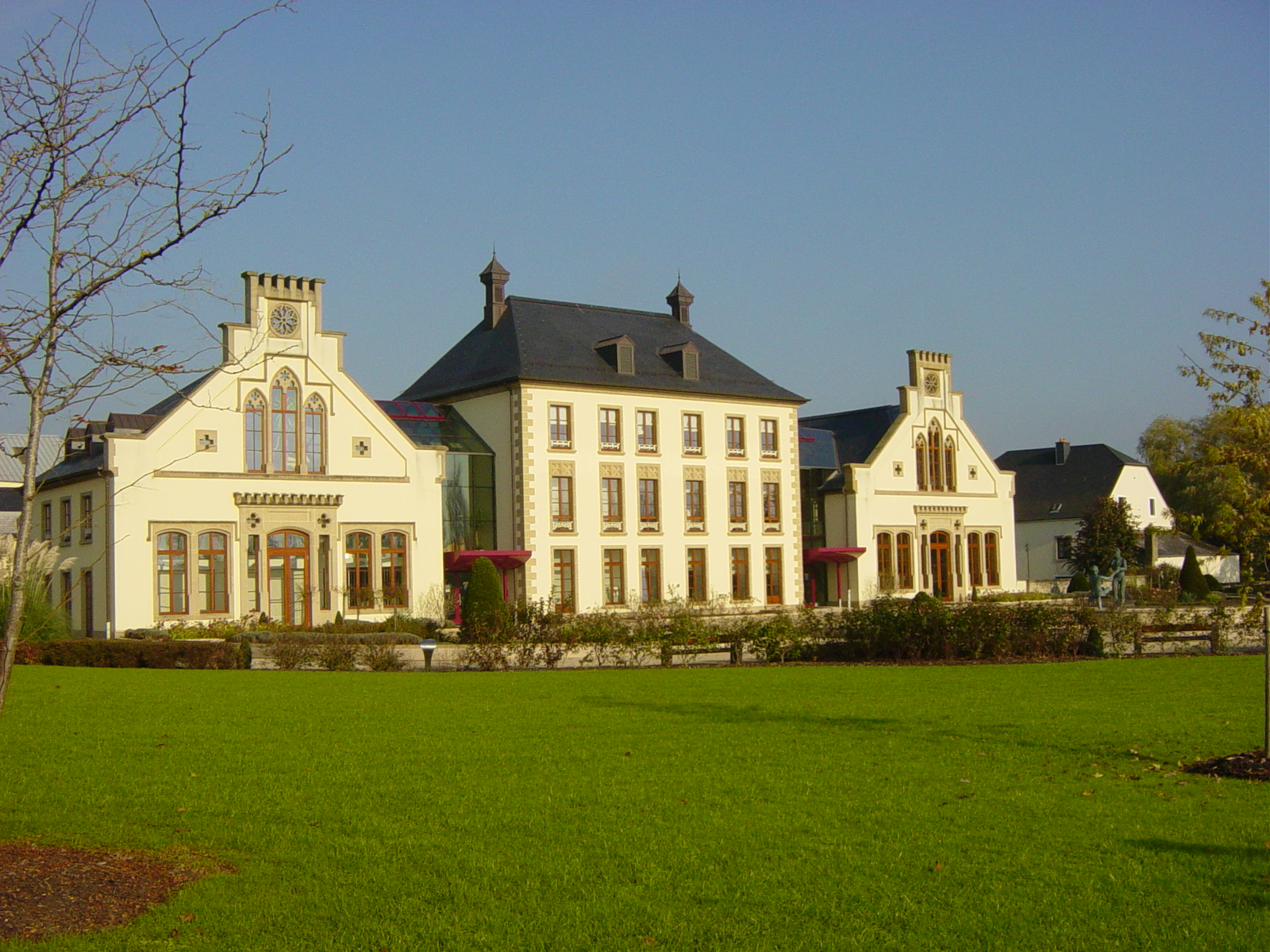
- Mamer Castle, now the town hall

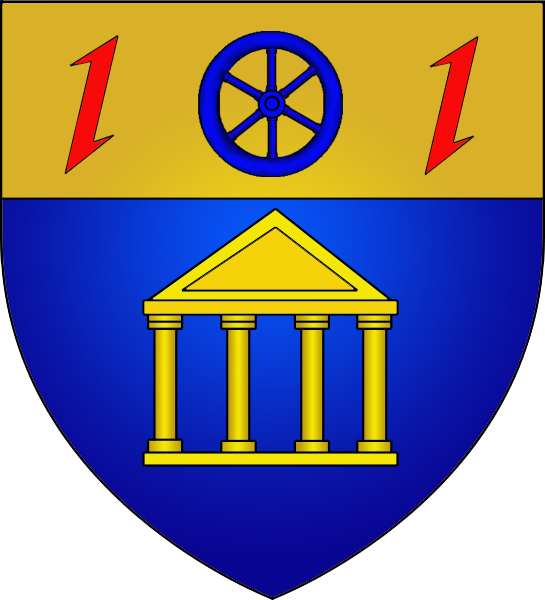
- Coat of arms

- Map of Luxembourg with Mamer highlighted in orange, and the canton in dark red
- Coordinates: 49.6283333°N 6.0261111°E
- Country: Luxembourg
- Canton: Capellen

Government
  - Mayor: Luc Feller

Area
  - Total: 27.54 km^{2} (10.63 sq mi)
  - Rank: 31st of 100
- Highest elevation: 353 m (1,158 ft)
  - Rank: 83rd of 100
- Lowest elevation: 263 m (863 ft)
  - Rank: 66th of 100

Population (2026)
  - Total: 11,855
  - Rank: 11th of 100
  - Density: 430.5/km^{2} (1,115/sq mi)
  - Rank: 21st of 100
- Time zone: UTC+1 (CET)
  - Summer (DST): UTC+2 (CEST)
- LAU 2: LU0000108
- Website: www.mamer.lu

Mamer (German pronunciation: [ˈmaːmɐ]; Luxembourgish pronunciation: [ˈmaːmɐ]) is a commune and town (strictly classified as a village) in south-western Luxembourg. It is located 7 km (4.3 mi) west of Luxembourg City. The commune includes both Mamer itself and the smaller communities of Capellen and Holzem. Mamer is situated on the river Mamer, a tributary of the Alzette. The A6 motorway from Luxembourg to Brussels, also designated European route E25, runs through Mamer.

As of September 2026, Mamer, which lies in the east of the commune, has a population of 8,516. The commune as a whole is the eleventh-most populous in the country.

== History ==
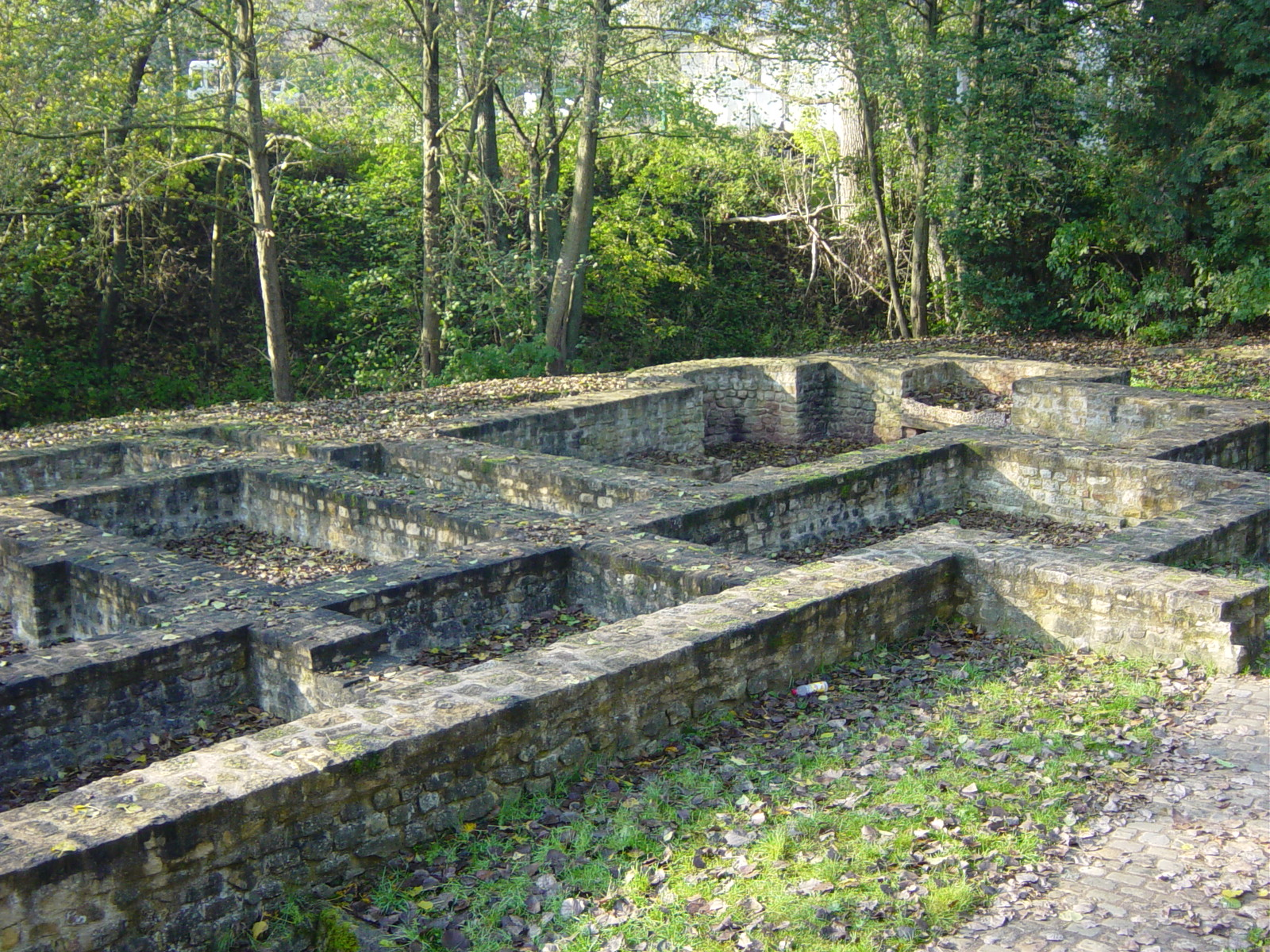
Ruins of the Gallo-Roman baths

The Treveri, a Gallic or Celtic tribe, inhabited the region for several hundred years until they were conquered by Julius Caesar in 54 BC. A Celtic necropolis from the 1st century was discovered in the early 1970s on the Juckelsboesch plateau between Mamer and Kehlen. A beautiful dark blue glass bowl was among the offerings found in the tombs.

During the Gallo-Roman era which lasted until about 450, the Romans built and maintained a number of roads in the area including the Kiem (Latin caminus, road) linking Trier to Reims through what is now Mamer. Mambra was a Roman vicus centred on a villa with thermal baths, sited on the banks of the Mamer River at the eastern end of today's Mamer. The Roman settlement was burnt by Germanic invaders around 276.

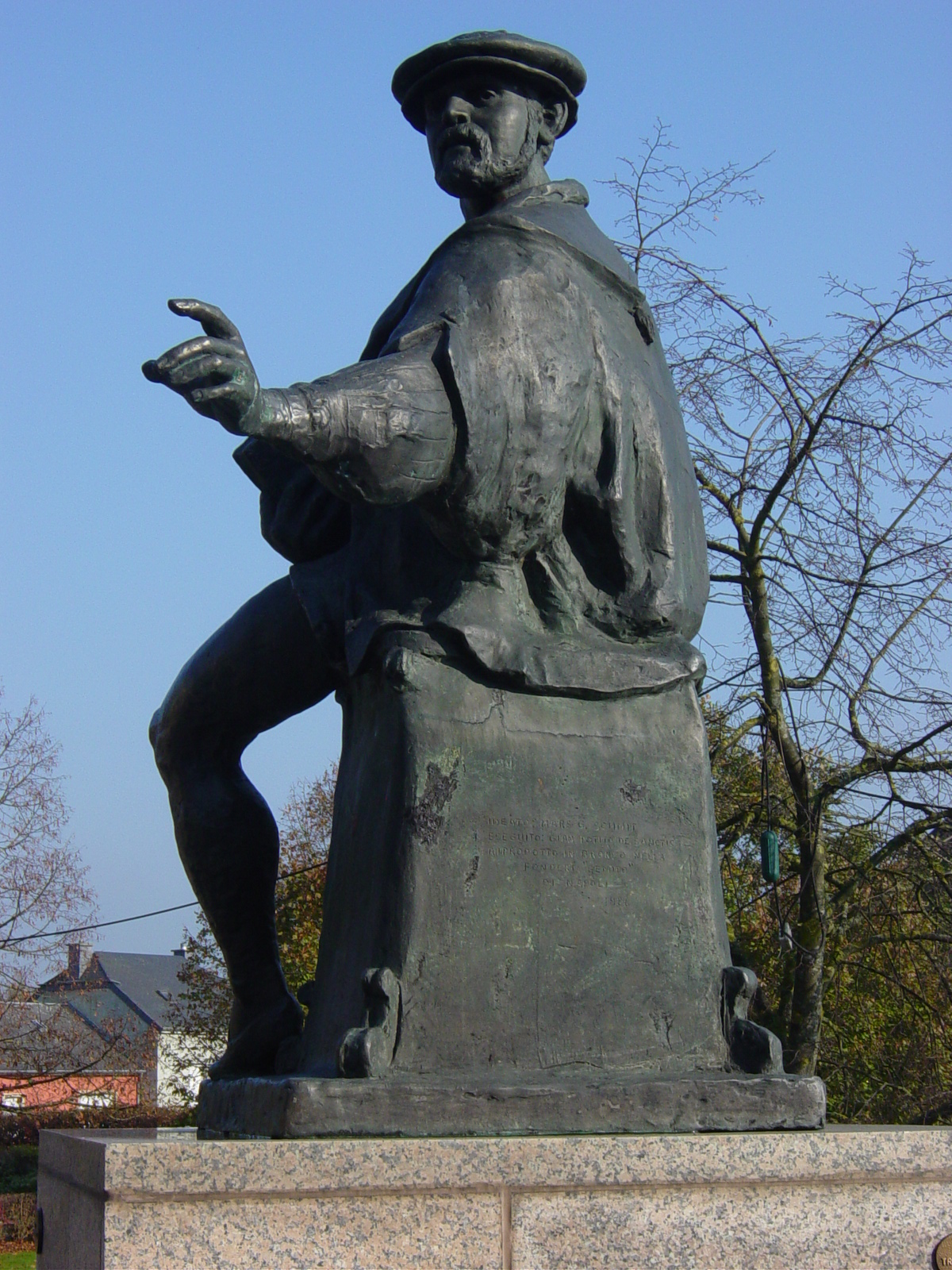
Statue of Nicolaus Mameranus, Mamer

The oldest historical reference to Mamer is to be found in a document which records how, on 8 April 960, Lutgardis, daughter of Wigeric, Count Palatine, made a gift of the hamlet of Mambra to Saint Maximin's Abbey in Trier for the benefit of the monks.

Nicolaus Mameranus was born in Mamer in 1500. A soldier and historian under Charles V, he succeeded in having the Emperor pay for the restoration of the village of Mamer after the Duke of Orléans' troops pillaged it in 1543. In 1555, he was appointed poet laureate.

The road linking Luxembourg City to Brussels, passing through Mamer, was built in 1790. In 1859, the railway to Brussels was opened, with a station in Mamer.

The inhabitants of Mamer suffered under the First and Second World Wars, although the town itself escaped bombing. The Voie de la Liberté commemorating the victorious route of the Allies after the D-Day landings passes through Mamer which was liberated on 10 September 1944.

Since 1945, Mamer has prospered year-by-year as a result of its location close to Luxembourg City and its excellent road and rail connections. In 2003, the Lycée Technique Josy Barthel was opened, as was the Mamer-Lycée railway station, which serves it.

== Population ==
The population of Mamer has substantially increased over the past 40 years, reaching 5,047 in 2005 and 8,173 in 2014. Some 46% are foreigners, representing over 60 countries, with significant numbers from Portugal (560), France (478), Belgium (456), Denmark (225), and Germany (214). This can be ascribed to Mamer's development as a commuter town for those working in the international institutions and financial services in and around Luxembourg City.

Historical population

Year	Pop.	±%
1821	1,223	—
1851	1,783	+45.8%
1900	1,948	+9.3%
1910	1,974	+1.3%
1922	1,977	+0.2%
1935	2,073	+4.9%

Year	Pop.	±%
1947	2,070	−0.1%
1960	2,455	+18.6%
1970	3,123	+27.2%
1981	5,423	+73.6%
1990	6,197	+14.3%
2000	6,637	+7.1%

Year	Pop.	±%
2005	6,866	+3.5%
2010	7,499	+9.2%
2015	8,463	+12.9%
2020	9,913	+17.1%
2021	10,218	+3.1%

Source data

== Politics ==
=== Local administration ===
The communal council, with offices at Mamer Castle, consists of 13 members: 6 from the Christian Social People's Party (currently Luxembourg's leading party), 3 Luxembourg Socialist Workers' Party, 2 Democratic Party, and 2 The Greens. The mayor, Gilles Roth (CSV), in his second term since October 2005, is a lawyer and counsellor at the Ministry of Finance. Since April 2006, he has been chairman of the CSV's communal councils committee. A native of Mamer, he is married with one child.

=== Coat of arms ===
The communal coat of arms (top right-hand box) consists of a temple on a blue background with four golden columns which is headed by a blue wheel between two hooks. The colours are based on the arms of the Mersch-Rodemacks who were once lords of Mamer. The temple depicts Mamer's long history and its recently discovered Roman vestiges. The wheel stems from the arms of the Mameranus family while the two hooks are reminiscent of the crest of the Mamer family.

== Mamer today ==
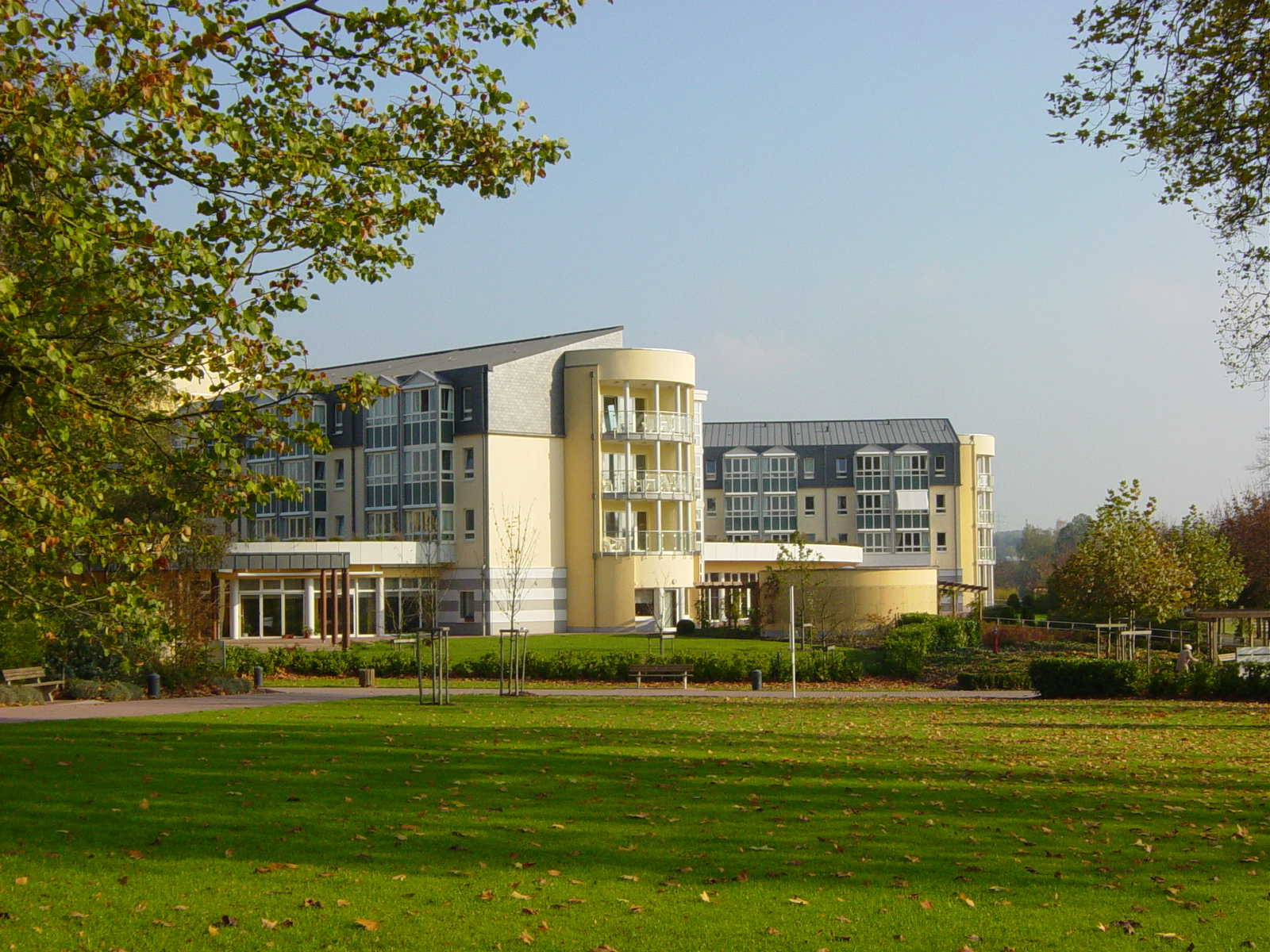
Recently opened retirement home

Only 7 km west of Luxembourg City, Mamer enjoys a pleasant semi-rural setting in Luxembourg's Gutland, where the undulating surroundings are ideal for cattle farming, crops and forestry. The centre of the original village is to the south of the N6 (Route d'Arlon) from Luxembourg City to Arlon. This is where the church, town hall, and most of the shops are located. Several restaurants are located along the Route d'Arlon itself. The extensive Belle Etoile shopping centre is 2 km to the east. Most of the recent housing developments have been to the north, between the N6 and the E25 motorway, particularly in the Cité Mameranus area. There have also been commercial developments to the west close to the Mamer motorway exit.

Since 2000, Mamer has seen the opening of a high school, the Lycée Technique Josy Barthel; a new railway station, Mamer-Lycée; an old people's home; and a new local administrative centre in Mamer Castle. In addition, the Kinneksbond, a large primary school and pre-school complex, opened in 2007. Adjacent to the school buildings, the ultra-modern Kinneksbond cultural centre opened in October 2010. A second European School for Luxembourg is now being built in the area.

=== Public transport ===
The commune boasts three railway stations: Mamer, Mamer-Lycée, and Capellen. All three are located on Line 50, which connects Luxembourg City to the west of the country. From Mamer, there are regular train services to Luxembourg City (to the east) and Kleinbettingen and Arlon (to the west).

In addition to a frequent bus service to Luxembourg and Kirchberg (European Institutions and financial centre), long-distance routes connect Mamer to Arlon, Clemency, Septfontaines, Keispelt, Steinfort, Redange and Eischen. Mamer also has a variety of school-bus routes serving both the Luxembourg schools and the European School.

=== Facilities and services ===
In recent years, Mamer has seen the development of a wide range of services including an Ambulance and Fire Station, primary and secondary schools, a post office, a pharmacy, banks, garages, restaurants and an inn. Shopping facilities in the vicinity are excellent (large supermarkets within a couple of minutes' drive) while Mamer itself has a number of smaller shops offering day-to-day produce. Doctors, dentists, opticians and vets can be found in Mamer and its surroundings. There is an open market on the first and third Friday of the month from 4 to 7 p.m. Mamer also has a large park on either side of the river, a sports centre, a football stadium and several children's playing grounds.

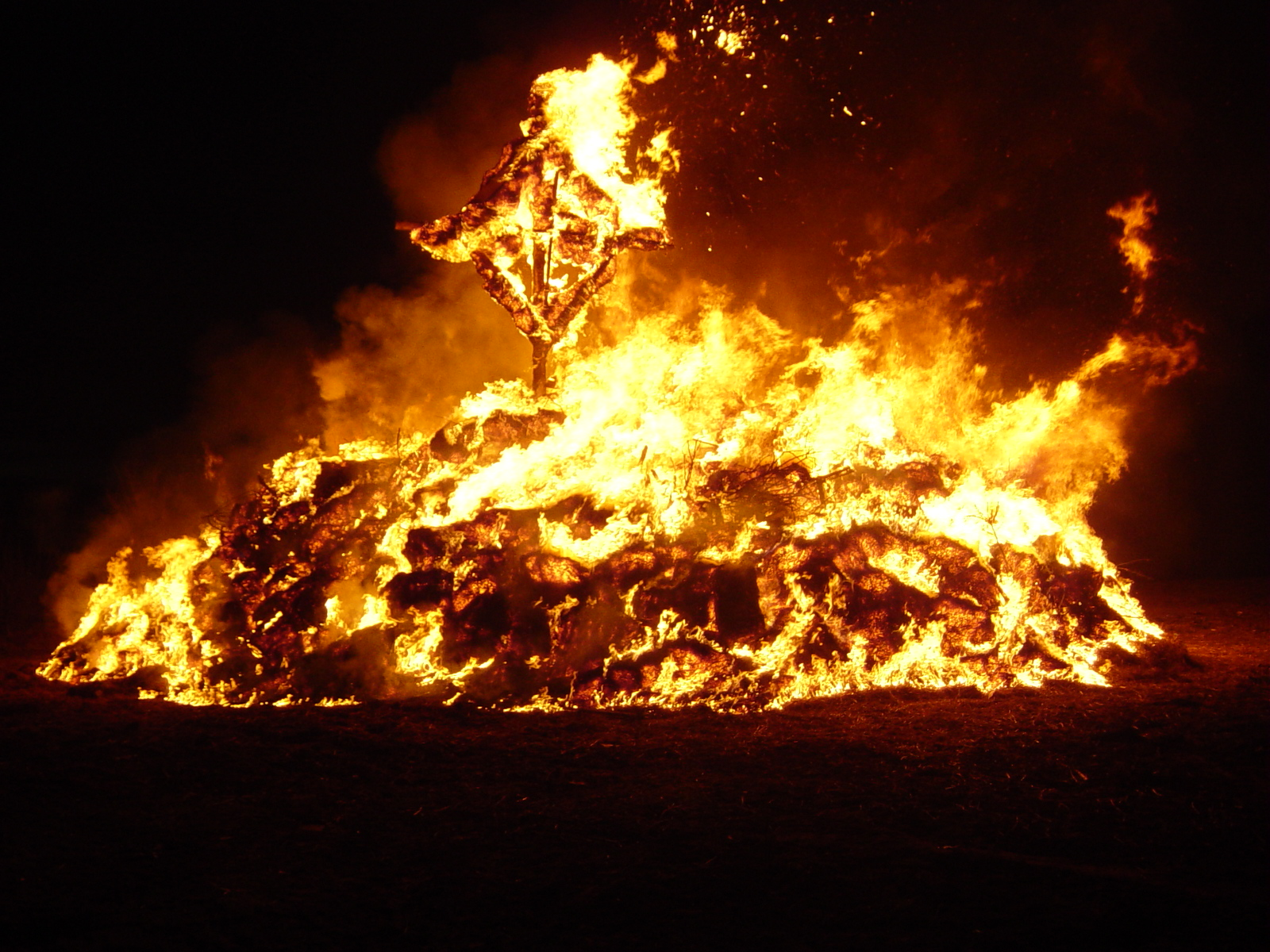
Bonfire for the winter buergbrennen festival celebrated in most Luxembourgish villages

Apart from services in different languages at the parish church, Luxembourg's Islamic Cultural Centre, together with its mosque, offers a variety of educational and religious services.

=== Leisure and sports ===
Mamer has an active brass band, a stamp-collectors' club and a photo club. Its football club, FC Mamer 32, with teams for both men and women, has been increasingly successful in recent years. There are also facilities for cyclists in the area including a signposted route and, once a year, a traffic-free day for cyclists between Mamer and Mersch. There are also a number of village fetes and festivals, usually centred on the square outside the church. Even in the winter, there is a Christmas market in mid-December and the traditional burgbrennen evening celebrating the end of winter with an enormous bonfire.

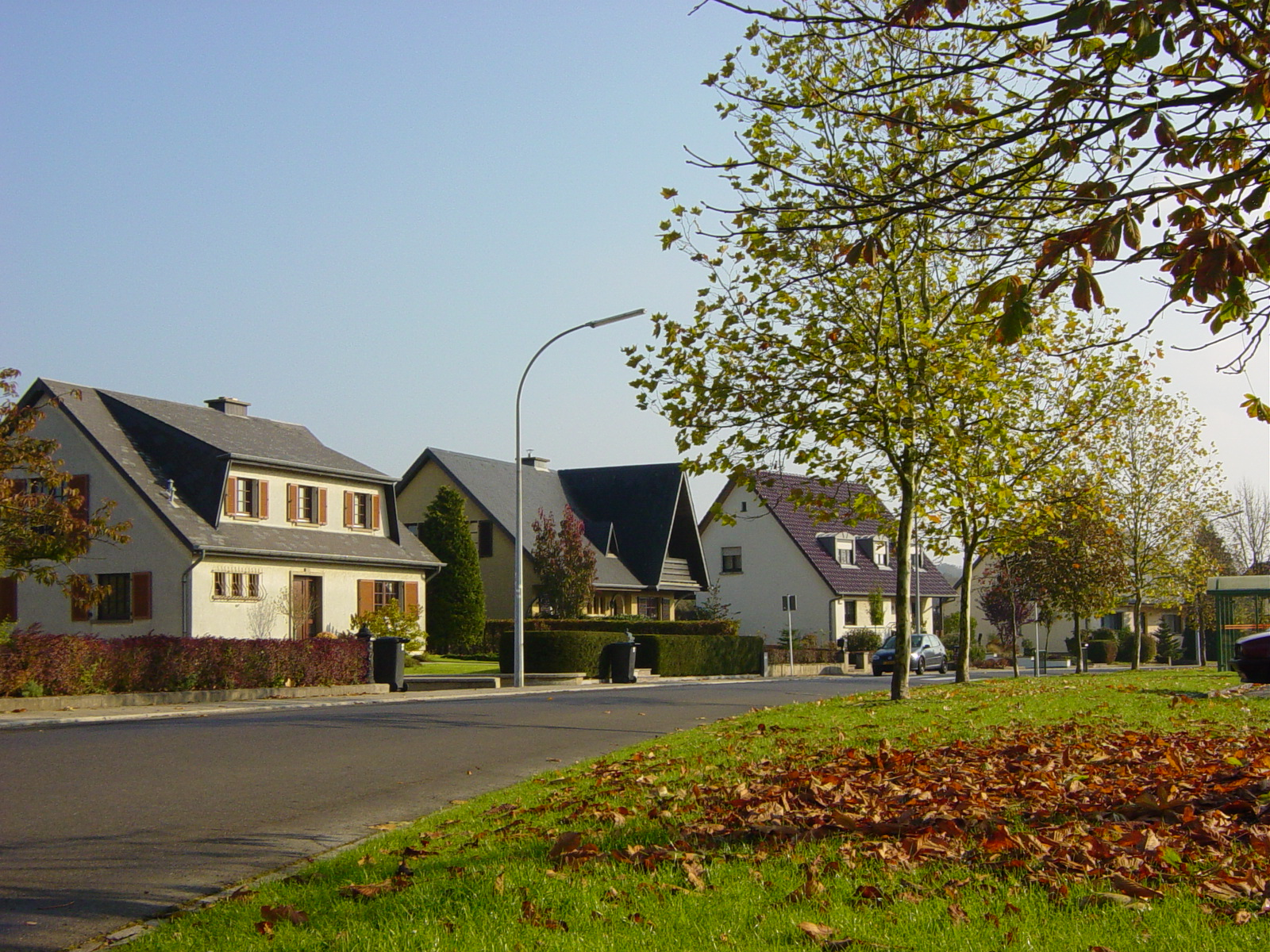
Domaine Mont Royal: typical of Mamer's residential areas

=== Standard of living ===
Luxembourg is at or near the top of world rankings for GDP per capita and for quality of life. As a result, living standards are high throughout the country, especially in residential areas around Luxembourg City, including Mamer itself. Private houses, many fully detached, usually have sizeable gardens, garages and cellars. There are also a few apartment buildings and houses for rent. Costs of accommodation are high as a result of increasing demand but are offset by low municipal taxes and Luxembourg's low sales tax, particularly on fuel. Cable television is provided throughout the commune and includes stations broadcasting in languages other than the local French, German and Luxembourgish. A very wide range of TV programmes can be accessed via satellite including English-language BBC and SKY channel. Broadband or cable-based internet access is widely available. There are excellent facilities for garbage collection and recycling.

== Economy ==
Although Mamer has developed mainly as a residential area, it has also experienced substantial progress in industry and commerce. Its most successful private company, Ceratizit (formerly Cerametal), now with some 950 employees, has become a world player in hard materials for wear protection and cutting tools. There are also a number of construction companies in the area, a laundry, a company specializing in computer storage and data protection , a branch of the huge GlaxoSmithKline pharmaceuticals company as well as some financial institutions and consultants. In addition, the commercial development area between Mamer and Capellen has attracted a number of sophisticated stores and a substantial amount of new office space.

== Environment ==
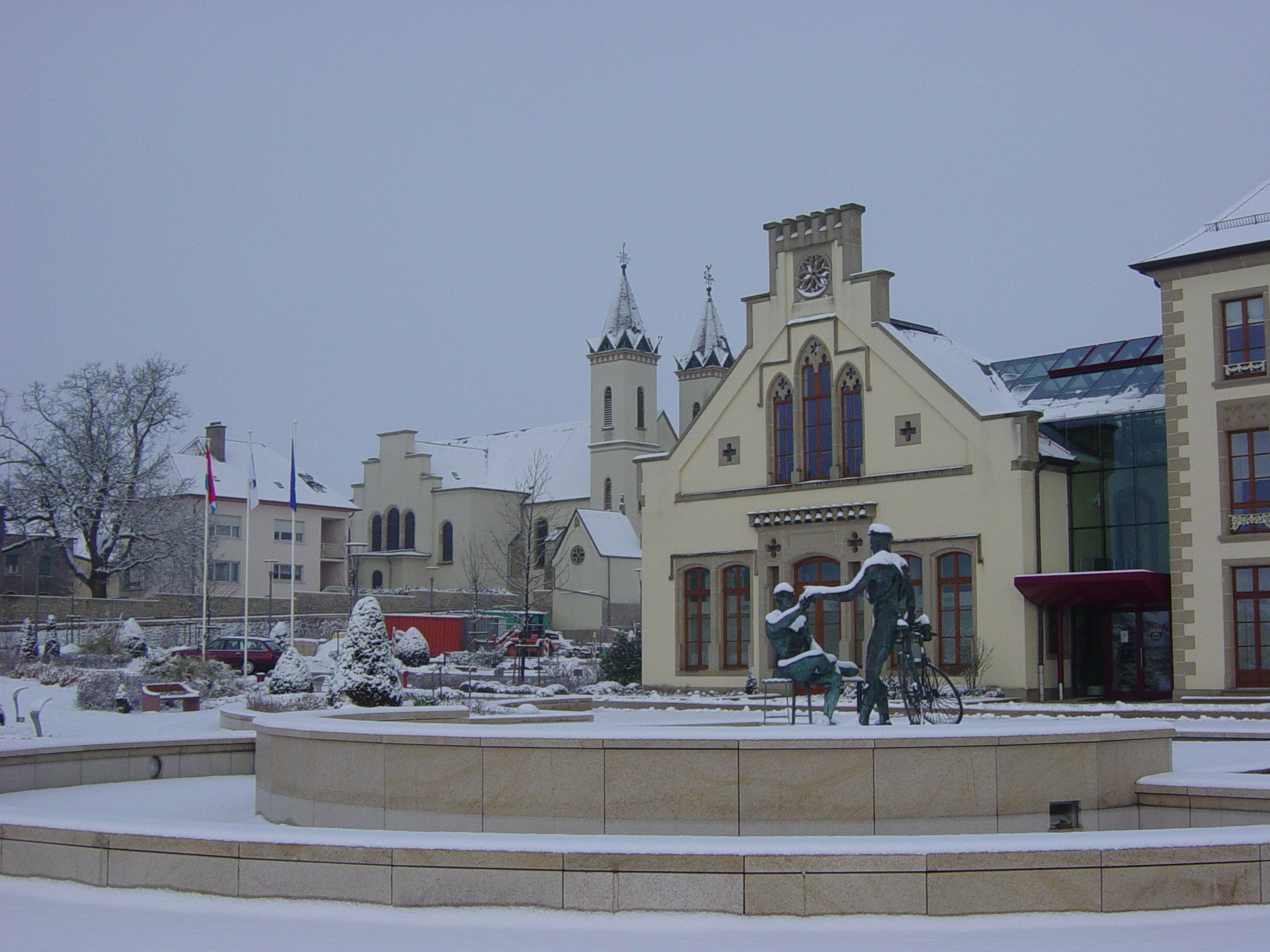
Mamer with a sprinkling of snow

=== Climate ===
Like Luxembourg City, Mamer (altitude 310 m) has a temperate climate with warm summers (average day temperature around 24 C, on occasion as high as 35 C) and chilly winters (daytime average 5 C but sometimes as low as -15 C at night). Rainfall is moderate, but on average it rains less than 10 days per month. The prevailing wind is south-westerly. Unlike many communities in Luxembourg, Mamer does not suffer from flooding but is occasionally hit by gales, hail storms and freezing rain. There is often a little snow in the winter but it does not usually cause inconvenience as salting and snow-clearing facilities are well coordinated.

The summer evenings in Mamer are particularly pleasant, often with temperatures of around 25 C until 11 pm. Very occasionally there are short periods of drought but the vegetation seldom loses its rich green for very long.

Daylight extends from about 5 am to 10:30 pm in June and from 8 am to 4:30 pm in December.

=== Wildlife ===
A wide variety of wild animals and birds have been observed in the area. Wild animals observed in the area include wild boar, deer, foxes, hares and rabbits. Local bird species include sparrows, swallows, starlings, crows, rooks, magpies, pigeons, finches and robins as well as see flocks of migrating wild geese flying by. In the forest, you might hear - and sometimes see - owls and woodpeckers. Although some species have suffered from hunting in recent years, there are now conservation efforts to protect flora and fauna, and an area of the commune's forest is now a nature reserve.

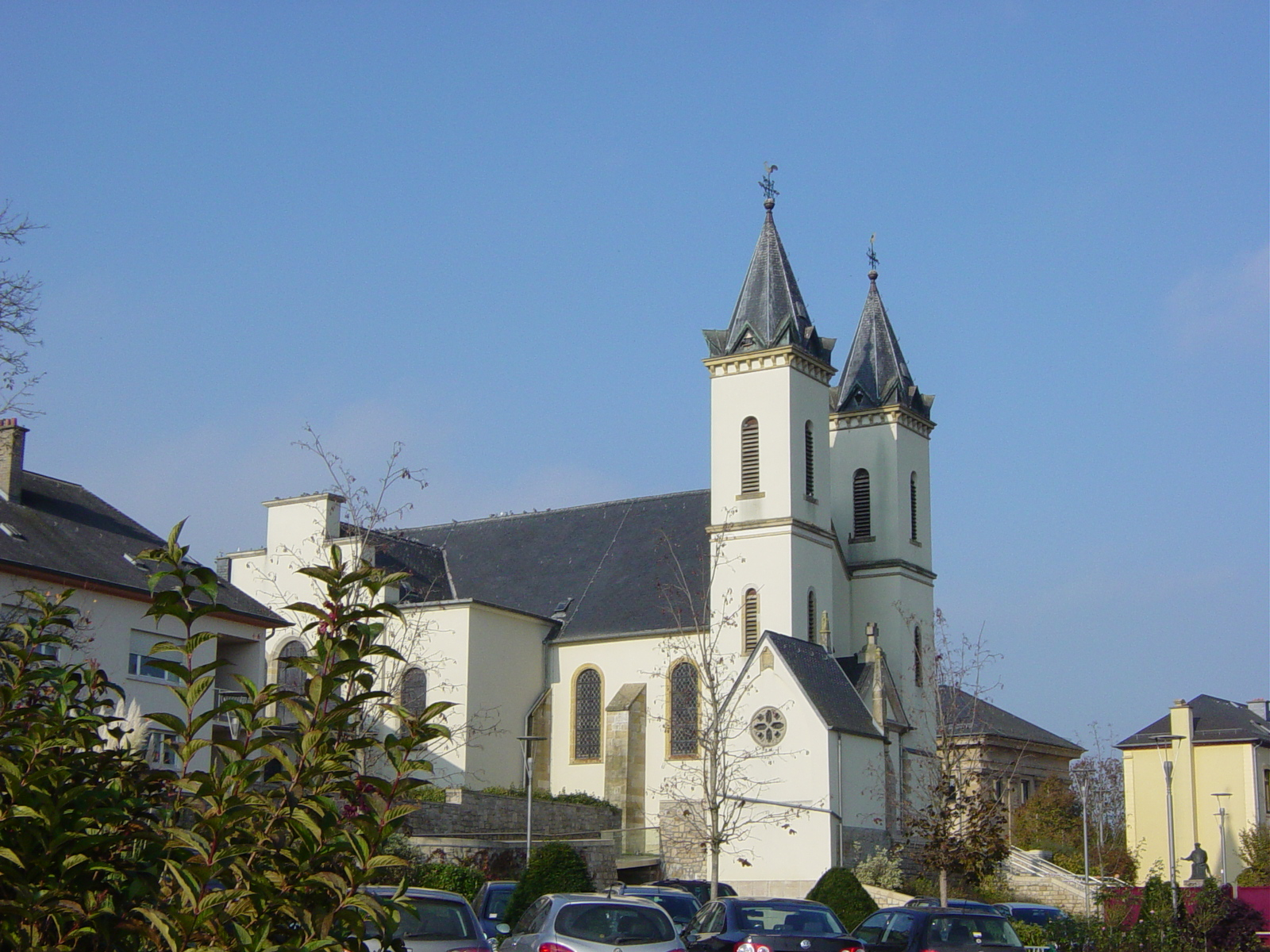
Mamer's parish church built in 1723

=== Places of interest ===
- Roman baths, discovered on the north bank of the River Mamer in 1973.
- Mamer Castle , 1830, which was recently fully restored and now serves as the town hall or Administration Communale.
- Church of John the Baptist (1723) with a history dating back to the 10th century.
- Mamer River Valley with paths for walkers, riders and cyclists through its hilly wooded surroundings.
- Lycée Technique Josy Barthel , a secondary school which opened in 2003.

== Famous people ==
- Nicolaus Mameranus (1500–1567), soldier and historian under Emperor Charles V.
- Henri Kirpach (1841–1911), a Luxembourgish politician and lawyer; member of the Council of State
- Nicolas Frantz (1889–1985), cyclist, won the Tour de France in 1927 and 1928.
- Josy Barthel (1927–1992), athlete, 1500 m gold medallist at the 1952 Summer Olympics

== Twin towns ==
Mamer is twinned with:

- Dangé-Saint-Romain, France
