= Hagen, Luxembourg =

Town in Luxembourg

Coordinates: 49°39′N 5°56′E

Hagen (German pronunciation: [ˈhaːɡn̩]; Luxembourgish: Hoen) is a small town in the commune of Steinfort, in western Luxembourg. As of September 2026, the town has a population of 1,616.
