= Kinneksbond =

Coordinates: 49°37′41″N 06°01′50″E

The Kinneksbond cultural centre

Kinneksbond is a cultural centre in Mamer in southern Luxembourg. Opened in October 2010, it houses a 480-seat auditorium with a stage and orchestra pit suitable for concerts, drama performances and shows. Designed by the architect Jim Clemes from Esch-sur-Alzette, the ultra-modern facility also contains dress rooms, a room for band rehearsals and a number of smaller rooms for music teaching. There is a spacious foyer with a cloakroom and bar.

Located some 9 km (5.6 mi) west of Luxembourg City, it is home both to the Orchestre de Chambre du Luxembourg and to the brass band Harmonie Mamer. It regularly hosts shows and musical productions, attracting audiences not only from the local area but from south-western Luxembourg and the border regions. In addition to its local cultural functions, the centre is also available for conferences and business meetings.
