= Nicolaus Mameranus =

Luxembourgish soldier (1500–1567)

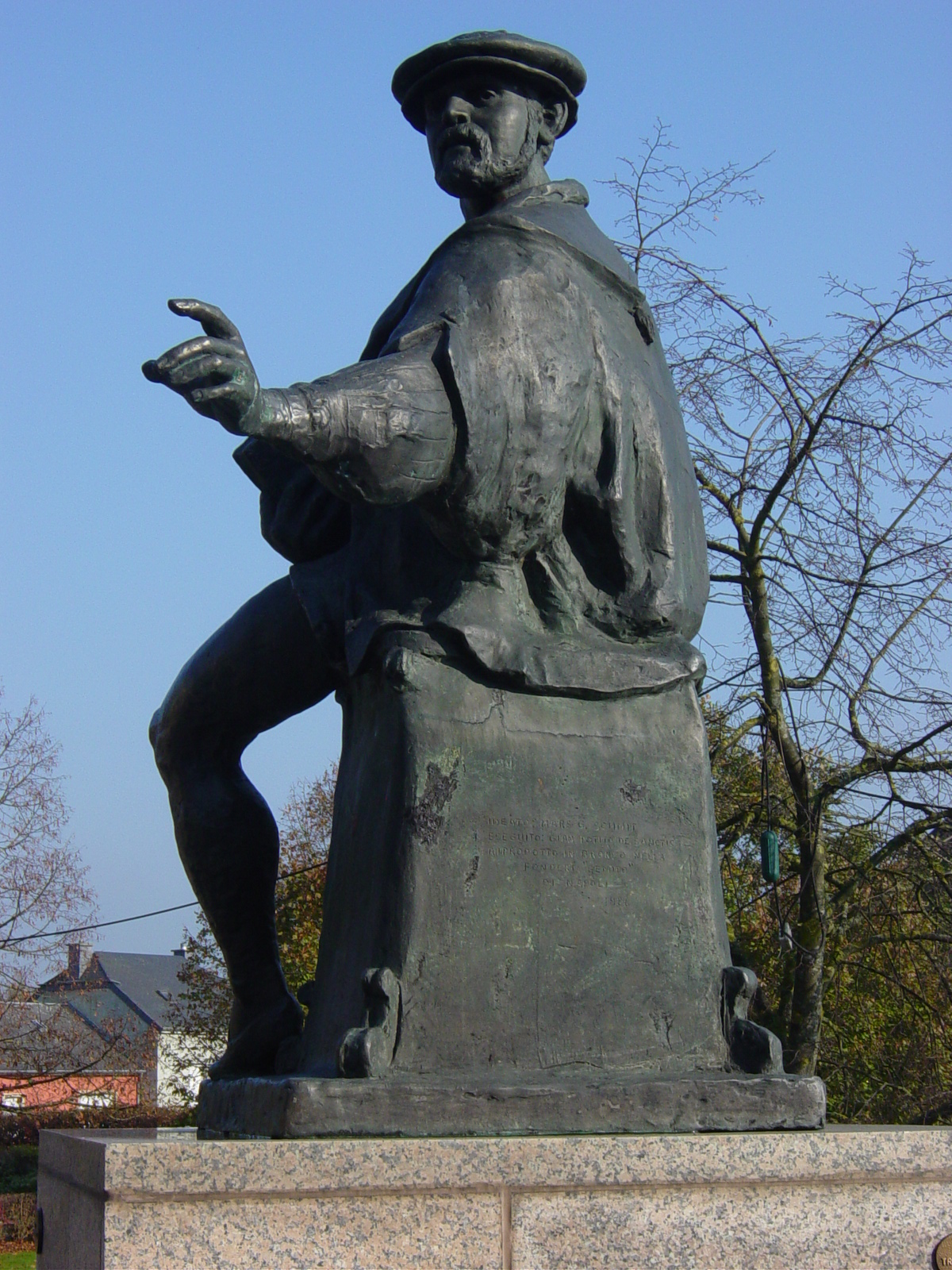
Statue of Nicolaus Mameranus, Mamer

Nicolaus Mameranus (6 December 1500 – 1567) was a Luxembourgish soldier and historian under Charles V, for whom he travelled widely, recording faithfully the composition of foreign courts and the customs of foreign countries. All his writings are in Latin. Mameranus was born in Mamer, probably as Nik Wagener. He was a Roman Catholic.

Mameranus succeeded in having Charles V pay for the restoration of his native Mamer after the Duke of Orléans' troops pillaged it in 1543. In 1555, Charles V appointed him poet laureate and Count Palatine in recognition of his continued support.

He probably died in Augsburg, Germany, in 1567.
