= Mamer (musician) =

Mamar
- Born: 1970 (age 55–56); Qitai County, China
- Genres: Folk
- Instruments: dombra, guitar, sherter, drums
- Label: Real World Records

Mamer (pinyin: Mǎmù’ěr, born 1970) is a Chinese contemporary folk musician. His work combines elements from traditional Kazakh folk music with Western folk music. He was born and raised in Qitai County in the northeastern part of Xinjiang.

== Discography ==
- Eagle (2009)
