= Health issue =

Health issue may refer to:

- Health issue, as a disease
- Health issue, as an issue of public health
- Health issue, as a particular topic of health policy
- Health issue, as a particular topic of health advocacy
