= Mamer-Lycée railway station =

Railway station in Luxembourg

Coordinates: 49°37′07″N 06°01′23″E

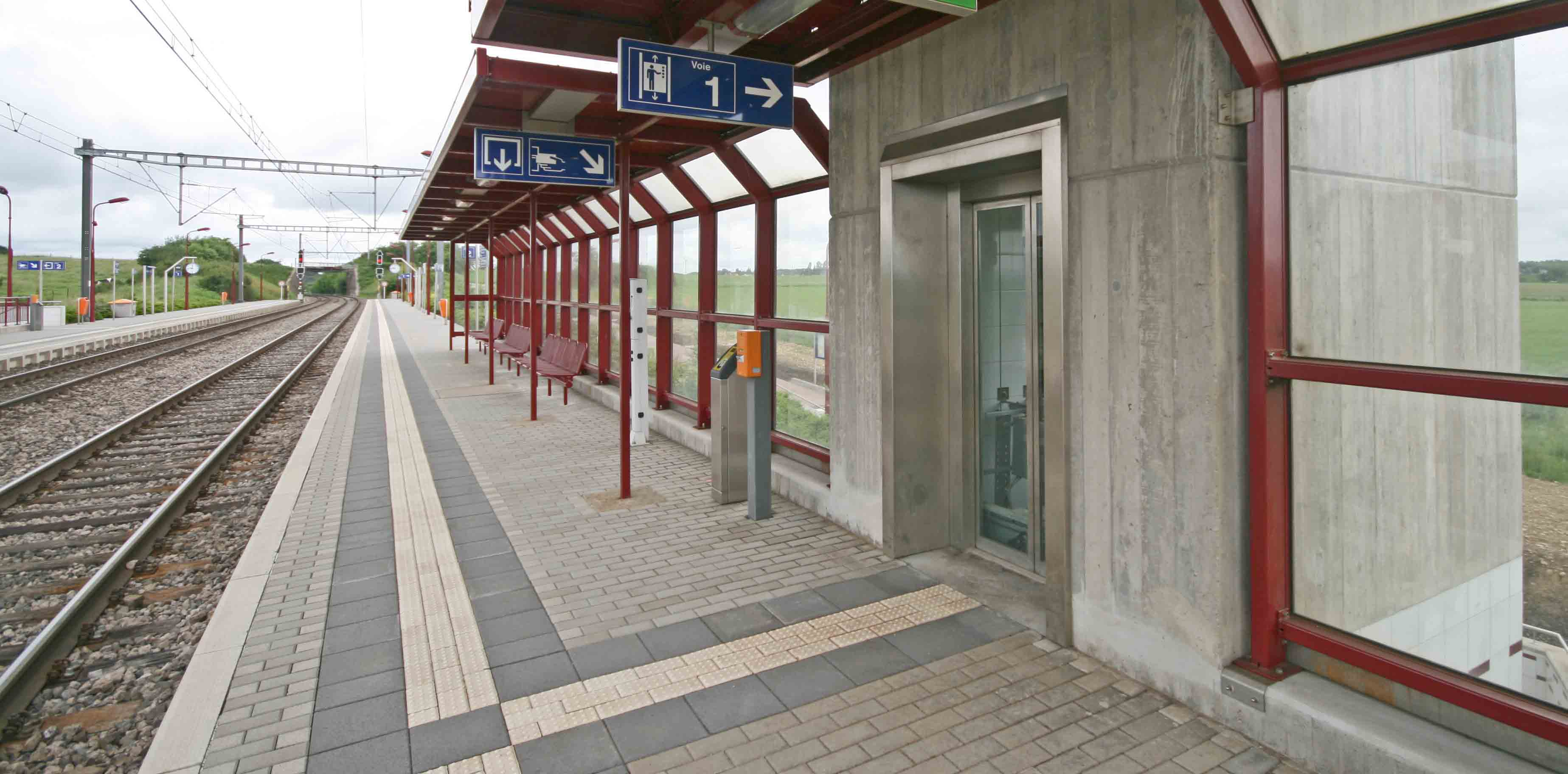
Mamer-Lycée train station

Mamer-Lycée railway station (Luxembourgish: Gare Mamer-Lycée, French: Gare de Mamer-Lycée, German: Bahnhof Mamer-Lycée) is a railway station in Mamer, in south-western Luxembourg. It is named after the Lycée Technique Josy Barthel, which it was built to serve. It is operated by Chemins de Fer Luxembourgeois, the state-owned railway company.

The station also serves the European School, Luxembourg II. In 2013 some parents at the school expressed concern with the speeds of some of the trains.

The station is situated on Line 50, which connects Luxembourg City to the west of the country and the Belgian town of Arlon.

Preceding station	CFL	Following station
Bertrange-Strassen towards Luxembourg	Line 50	Mamer towards Arlon
