= Bernard of Luxemburg =

Dominican theologian

Bernard of Luxemburg (died 1535) was a Dominican theologian, controversialist, and Inquisitor of the Archdioceses of Cologne, Mainz, and Trier.

== Biography ==
Born about 1460 at Strassen, near Luxembourg; died at Cologne, 5 October 1535. He studied at the latter place where he entered the Order of Preachers, received the baccalaureate at Leuven, 1499, and was appointed Master of Students at Cologne, 1506. In 1507, he became Regent of Studies at Leuven; fellow of the college of Doctors at Cologne, in 1516; and served twice as Prior of Cologne.

The Catholic Encyclopedia describes Bernard as "somewhat lacking in critical judgment" but "a safe and indefatigable defender of the Faith against the heretics of his time."

Bernard's important works are:

- Catalogus haereticorum omnium, etc. (Erfurt, 1522; Cologne, 1523; Paris 1524)
- Concilium generale malignantium, etc. (1528)
- De ordinibus militaribus, etc. (Cologne, 1527).
