= Steinfort =

Steinfort Stengefort (Luxembourgish)
- Commune
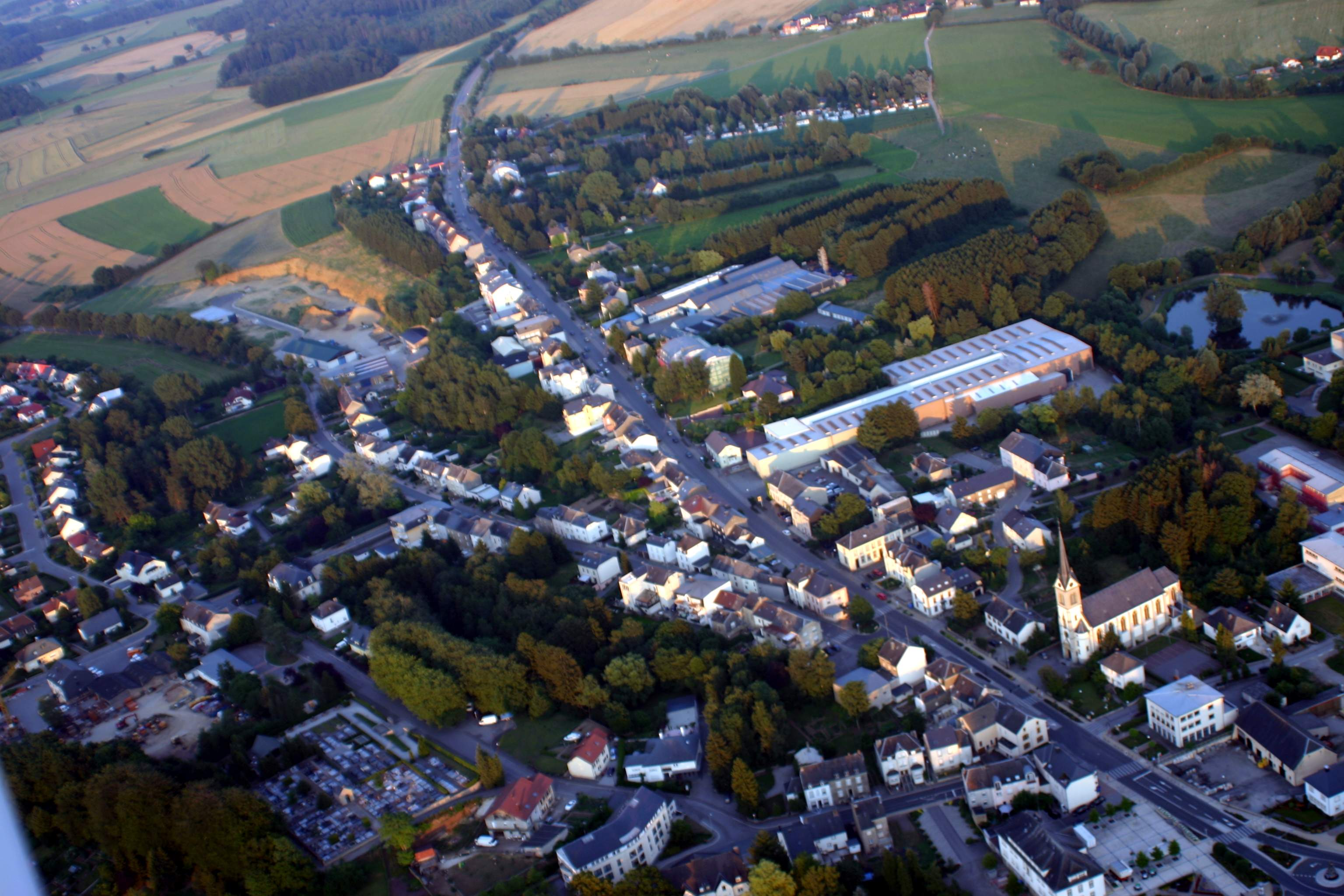

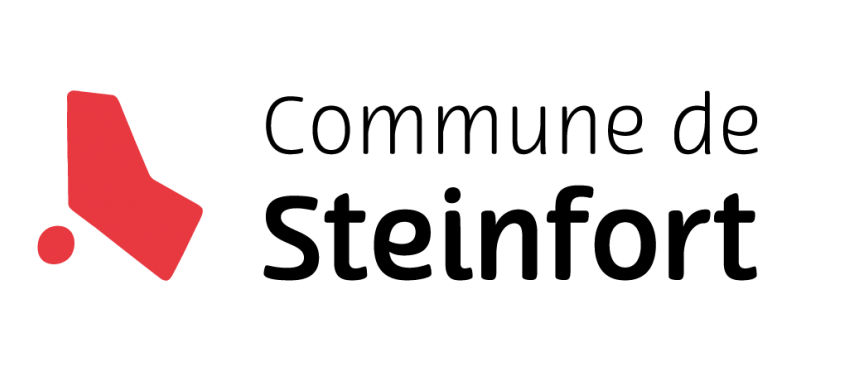
- Coat of arms Brandmark

- Map of Luxembourg with Steinfort highlighted in orange, and the canton in dark red
- Coordinates: 49.66°N 5.9156°E
- Country: Luxembourg
- Canton: Capellen

Government
  - Mayor: Sammy Wagner

Area
  - Total: 12.16 km^{2} (4.70 sq mi)
  - Rank: 90th of 100
- Highest elevation: 349 m (1,145 ft)
  - Rank: 86th of 100
- Lowest elevation: 288 m (945 ft)
  - Rank: 89th of 100

Population (2026)
  - Total: 6,179
  - Rank: 26th of 100
  - Density: 508.1/km^{2} (1,316/sq mi)
  - Rank: 19th of 100
- Time zone: UTC+1 (CET)
  - Summer (DST): UTC+2 (CEST)
- LAU 2: LU0000110
- Website: steinfort.lu

Steinfort (German pronunciation: [ˈʃtaɪnfɔʁt]; Luxembourgish: Stengefort [ˈʃtæŋəfoχt]) is a commune and town in western Luxembourg. It is part of the canton of Capellen.

As of September 2026, the town of Steinfort, which lies in the north of the commune, has a population of 3,218. Other towns within the commune include Hagen, Kleinbettingen and Grass.

== Transport ==
=== Road ===
Steinfort lies at the Belgian/Luxembourg border on the Route d'Arlon (N6), the original road linking Luxembourg City to Arlon.

=== Rail ===
Steinfort was served by the Prince Henri Railway that ran from Pétange to Ettelbruck in the north of the country. Despite the line's closure in 1967, the rails were never lifted and old rail infrastructure is still visible through Steinfort, where it crosses Route D'Arlon at a level crossing.

Nearest railway stations:

- Kleinbettingen railway station

== Population ==
Historical population

Year	Pop.	±%
1821	652	—
1851	940	+44.2%
1900	1,620	+72.3%
1910	1,829	+12.9%
1922	2,131	+16.5%
1935	2,276	+6.8%

Year	Pop.	±%
1947	2,149	−5.6%
1960	2,338	+8.8%
1970	2,582	+10.4%
1981	2,845	+10.2%
1990	3,258	+14.5%
2000	4,036	+23.9%

Year	Pop.	±%
2005	4,284	+6.1%
2010	4,422	+3.2%
2015	4,682	+5.9%
2020	5,459	+16.6%
2021	5,617	+2.9%

Source data

== Notable Inhabitants ==
- Camille de Tornaco (1807–1880), a Belgian landowner and liberal politician.
- Jean Asselborn (born 1949), former Deputy Prime Minister and Minister of Foreign Affairs.
