= Lycée Technique Josy Barthel =

Secondary school in Luxembourg

Coordinates: 49°37′12″N 06°01′51″E

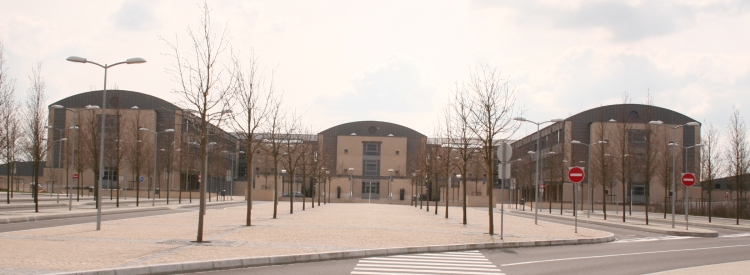

Lycée Josy Barthel (English: Josy Barthel High School), abbreviated to LJBM, is a high school in Mamer, in south-western Luxembourg. It was opened in September 2003, and cost €67.4m to build. It comprises 60 classrooms and 16 workshops, and has a capacity of 1,300 students. It is named after Josy Barthel, winner of Luxembourg's only Olympic gold medal-winner and former cabinet member.

It is served by its own railway station, Mamer-Lycée, which lies 500 metres (550 yards) to the west.

The first denomination of the highschool was Lycée technique Josy Barthel and has been changed into Lycée Josy Barthel on 1 September 2009. Since then the school offers all class from 7th to 1st degree (enseignement secondaire(in French)).
