= Strassen, Luxembourg =

Strassen Stroossen
- Commune
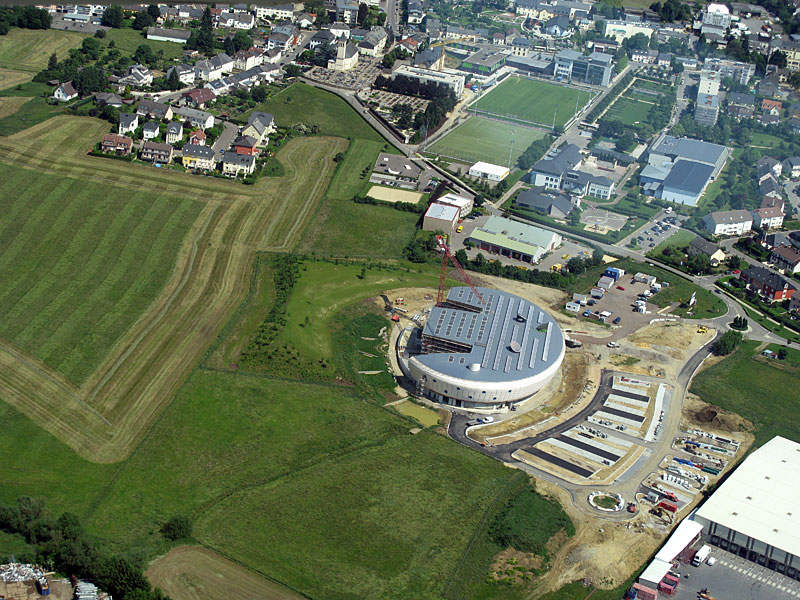

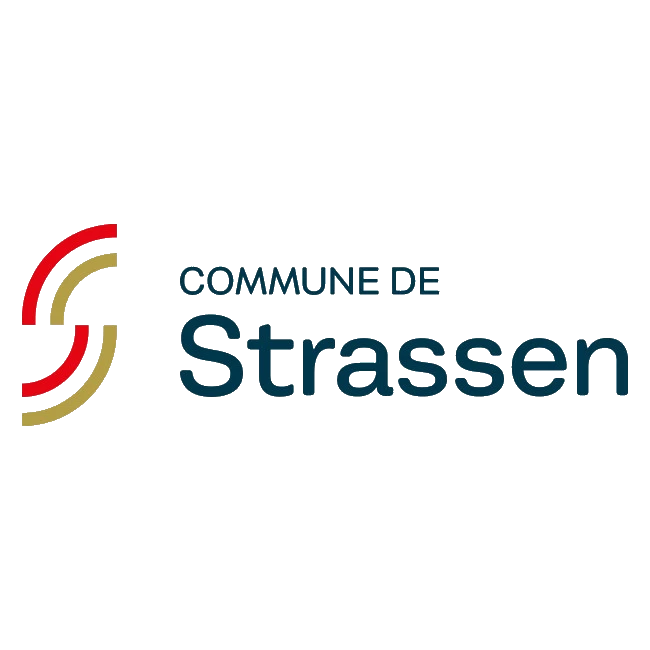
- Coat of arms Brandmark

- Map of Luxembourg with Strassen highlighted in orange, and the canton in dark red
- Coordinates: 49.6192°N 6.0719°E
- Country: Luxembourg
- Canton: Luxembourg

Government
  - Mayor: Nicolas Pundel

Area
  - Total: 10.71 km^{2} (4.14 sq mi)
  - Rank: 93rd of 100
- Highest elevation: 391 m (1,283 ft)
  - Rank: 60th of 100
- Lowest elevation: 265 m (869 ft)
  - Rank: 68th of 100

Population (2026)
  - Total: 11,093
  - Rank: 12nd of 100
  - Density: 1,036/km^{2} (2,683/sq mi)
  - Rank: 8th of 100
- Time zone: UTC+1 (CET)
  - Summer (DST): UTC+2 (CEST)
- LAU 2: LU0000309
- Website: strassen.lu

Strassen (German: [ˈʃtʁasn̩]; Luxembourgish: Stroossen [ˈʃtʀoːsən]) is a commune and town in central Luxembourg. It is part of the canton of Luxembourg.

In 2023, Strassen's had a population of 10,539 inhabitants. The current mayor of Strassen is Nico Pundel (CSV).

== Populated places ==
The commune consists of the following villages:

- Strassen
- Reckenthal (Note: Partly shared with the city commune of Luxembourg.) (lieu-dit)

== History ==
Strassen was formed on 6 January 1851, when it was detached from the commune of Bertrange. The law forming Strassen was passed on 6 August 1849.

The origins of the town began in Roman times. The name of Strassen comes from the Latin "strata", which means military road. In Roman times, the Roman road led from Trier through Arlon Strassen and Mamer upwards. Remains of the road were found in 1960 during the widening of Kiem Street. The seal of Johann Strassen (1411) and religious piety dating from 1500 (currently on display at the National Museum of the State), provided the basis for the municipal coat of arms created in 1976 and heraldic description of "Cloche d'or".

Due to a historical plague, one-third of the population of Strassen disappeared. With the cadastral maps during the time of Maria Theresia (1766), the area of Strassen was 2594.65 acres and the population was 417.

Strassen, along with some houses in Reckenthal, became a parish in 1804. In 1823, the town of Strassen was united with the town of Bertrange, but by a law of August 6, 1849, Strassen was again separated from Bertrange, effective 1 January 1850. Thus it became a separate municipality from Reckenthal. At that time, the population consisted of 1300.

In 1850, natives of Luxembourg, including some from Strassen, began to emigrate to the United States. The emigrants from Luxembourg started experiencing a high death rate in the US, which discouraged further emigration.

In 1854, the national poet Michel Rodange married a citizen of Strassen, by the name of Leysen Magdalene and they moved to Fels where he was a teacher.

The first water main was laid in 1908.

On 26 March 1943, during the German occupation of Luxembourg, Nazi authorities merged the commune of Strassen into Luxembourg City, alongside Walferdange and parts of Hesperange. This enlargement of city boundaries only lasted until the liberation of Luxembourg on 10 September 1944, when the previous boundaries were restored and Strassen once again became a separate commune.

For an entire century, the population did not change much. Strassen had 1400 citizens and 332 houses in 1946. In 1960, there were 1900 inhabitants and 20 years later 4200. In 1997, there were about 5000 inhabitants, and that number had doubled by 2023.

== Population ==
Historical population

Year	Pop.	±%
1821	595	—
1851	1,343	+125.7%
1900	1,330	−1.0%
1910	1,384	+4.1%
1922	1,478	+6.8%
1935	1,471	−0.5%

Year	Pop.	±%
1947	1,446	−1.7%
1960	1,892	+30.8%
1970	3,085	+63.1%
1981	4,242	+37.5%
1990	4,853	+14.4%
2000	5,980	+23.2%

Year	Pop.	±%
2005	6,283	+5.1%
2010	7,218	+14.9%
2015	8,026	+11.2%
2020	9,888	+23.2%
2021	10,249	+3.7%

Source data

== Urbanism ==
Strassen is considered to be one of the smallest communes of the country.

Due to a strong increase of Luxembourg's population, new districts are seeing the day in Strassen. Strassen has been ranked as the third most expensive commune in Luxembourg, with, as of Q2 2024, an average real estate price of €9,798 per square meter for existing properties and €11,500 per square meter for new properties. Strassen is also popular with expatriates, given its proximity to Luxembourg City, and its quality of life.

As in many other communes in Luxembourg, Strassen has a private aquatic center (built in October 2009) named Les Thermes, with a cost of €35,000,000. Luxembourg's national center of archery and the center of martial arts are also located in Strassen.

== Culture ==
In September, the biennial Stroossefestival takes part in central Strassen, with performances, food stalls, and attractions for all ages.

== Transport ==
Like elsewhere in the Grand Duchy of Luxembourg, public transport is effective and fast. There are buses (ecological hybrids) that connect to Luxembourg City. Strassen has provided for its citizens, a city night shuttle bus service.

== Education ==
In the municipal area, there are 4 schools, all modern and well equipped. In primary school, students lessons are in the three official languages of the country. The primary in Luxembourgish and the secondary language is German, while studying the prospect of having the second language cycle in French and the third language cycle in English.

== Notable Person ==
- Bernard of Luxemburg (d. 1535), Dominican theologian
