= CFL Line 50 =

Railway line in Luxembourg

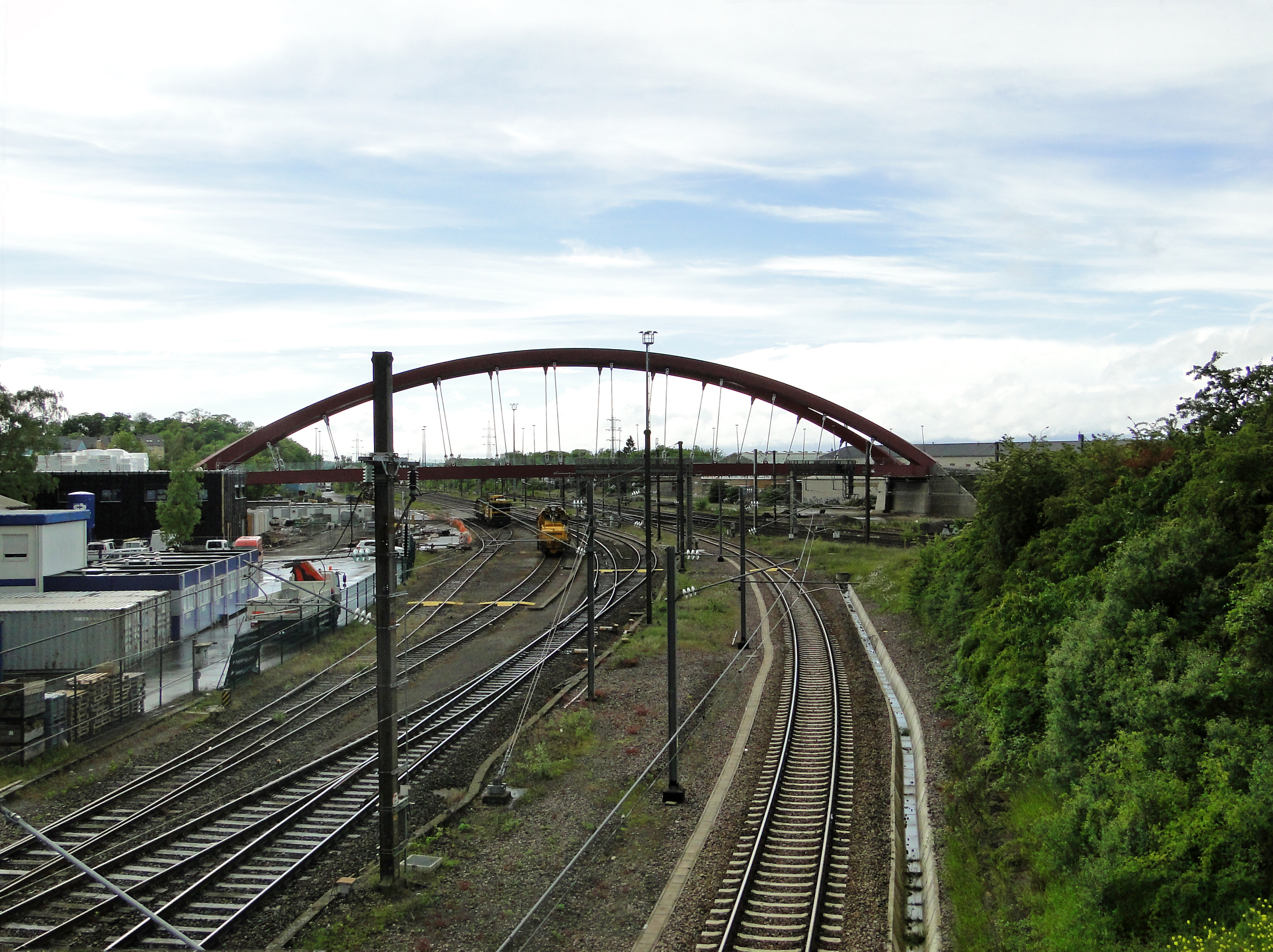
- CFL Line 50

Overview
- Status: Operational
- Locale: Capellen; Luxembourg
- Termini: Kleinbettingen; Luxembourg
- Stations: 7

Service
- Type: Heavy rail
- Services: 1
- Operator(s): CFL

History
- Opened: 15 September 1859

Technical
- Number of tracks: double track
- Track gauge: 1,435 mm (4 ft 8 1/2 in) standard gauge
- Electrification: 25 kV AC (2018–present); 3 kV DC (1956–2018)

Line 50 is a Luxembourgish railway line connecting Luxembourg City to the west of the country, leading to Kleinbettingen and on to Arlon, in south-eastern Belgium. The terminus at the eastern end is Luxembourg railway station. It is designated, and predominantly operated, by Chemins de Fer Luxembourgeois.

The line was opened by the Compagnie des chemins de fer de l'Est in 1859. In 1956, the line was electrified at 3 kV DC, in order to allow Belgian locomotives to go into Luxembourg station without changing at the border. The line was re-electrified at 25 kV AC on 16 September 2018, and services into Luxembourg are now run by multi-system SNCB/NMBS locomotives.

== Stations ==
- Luxembourg
- Bertrange-Strassen
- Mamer-Lycée
- Mamer
- Capellen
- Kleinbettingen
- Arlon (Belgium)
