= Kleinbettingen =

Coordinates: 49°38.75′N 5°54.93′E

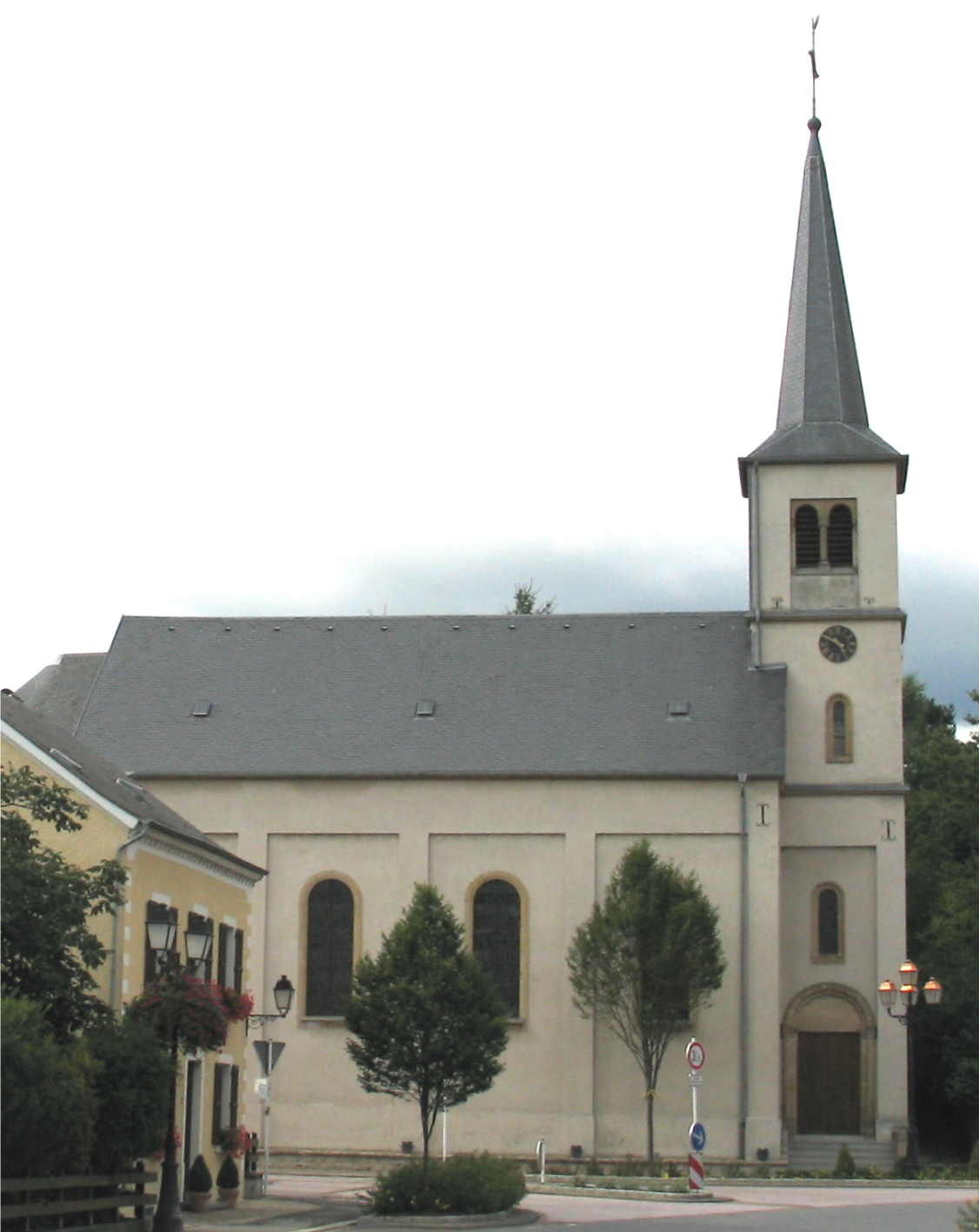
The church

Kleinbettingen (German pronunciation: [ˈklaɪnˌbɛtɪŋən]; Luxembourgish: Klengbetten) is a small town in the commune of Steinfort, in western Luxembourg. As of 2026, the town has a population of 1,160. It is served by Kleinbettingen railway station.
