= List of bridges in Luxembourg =

This list of bridges in Luxembourg lists bridges of particular historical, scenic, architectural or engineering interest in Luxembourg. Road and railway bridges, viaducts, aqueducts and footbridges are included.

As of 2018, there were 1,217 bridges in Luxembourg.

== Historical and architectural interest bridges ==
Image	Name	Distinction	Length	Type	Carries Crosses	Opened	Location	Province	Ref.
	Old Sauer Bridge (Echternach)	Germany–Luxembourg border Span : 28 m (92 ft)	91 m (299 ft)	Masonry; 4 arches	Road bridge Sauer	16th century	Echternach–Echternacherbrück; 49°48′45.9″N 6°25′35.1″E	Echternach; Germany	
	Castle Bridge (Luxembourg)	Old Quarters of Luxembourg City and Fortifications; World Heritage Site		Masonry; 2 levels (1 and 5 semi-circular arches)	National road 1 Sosthène Weis Street	1735	Luxembourg City; 49°36′41.8″N 6°8′9.5″E	Canton of Luxembourg	
	Adolphe Bridge	Longest masonry bridge span in the world when it was inaugurated Span : 84.65 m (277.7 ft); Designed by Paul Séjourné	153 m (502 ft)	Masonry; 3 arches (1 main semi-circular, 2 segmental)	Royal Boulevard; Pétrusse	1904	Luxembourg City; 49°36′30.4″N 6°7′37″E	Canton of Luxembourg	

== Major road and railway bridges ==
Image	Name	Span	Length	Type	Carries Crosses	Opened	Location	Province	Ref.
	Grand Duchess Charlotte Bridge	234 m (768 ft)	355 m (1,165 ft)	Box girder Steel; V-shaped legs	National road 51; Alzette	1965	Luxembourg City; 49°37′4″N 6°7′54.1″E	Echternach	
	Sauer Valley Bridge (Wasserbillig)	150 m (490 ft)	1,195 m (3,921 ft)	Box girder Steel; 90+4x125+150+125+2x90	A1 motorway Sauer	1987	Wasserbillig; 49°43′59.8″N 6°30′7″E	Grevenmacher; Germany	
	Victor Bodson Bridge	130 m (430 ft)	260 m (850 ft)	Cable-stayed; Composite steel/concrete deck, concrete pylon 130+130	A1 motorway Alzette	1993	Hesperange; 49°34′45″N 6°9′10.8″E	Echternach	
	Schengen Viaduct	130 m (430 ft)	607 m (1,991 ft)	Box girder Steel	A13 motorway Moselle	2002	Schengen; 49°28′45.4″N 6°22′4.4″E	Remich; Germany	
	Gréiwemaacher Bridge	114 m (374 ft)	213 m (699 ft)	Arch; Steel through arch Bow-string bridge	Road bridge Moselle	2013	Grevenmacher–Wellen; 49°40′32.7″N 6°26′37.8″E	Grevenmacher; Germany	
	A13 Motorway Bridge (Schifflange)	113 m (371 ft)	178 m (584 ft)	Arch; Steel tied arch Bow-string bridge	A13 motorway	1994	Schifflange; 49°30′36.1″N 6°2′4.7″E	Esch-sur-Alzette	

== Notes and references ==
- Nicolas Janberg. "International Database for Civil and Structural Engineering". Structurae.com.
- Others references

== See also ==
- lb:Lëscht vun däitsch-lëtzebuergesche Grenzbrécken (in Luxembourgish) - List of German-Luxembourgish border bridges
- de:Liste der Moselbrücken (in German) - List of bridges over the Moselle
- Transport in Luxembourg
- Rail transport in Luxembourg
- List of motorways in Luxembourg
- Geography of Luxembourg
