= N6 road (Luxembourg) =

National road in Luxembourg

N6
- Nationalstrooss 6
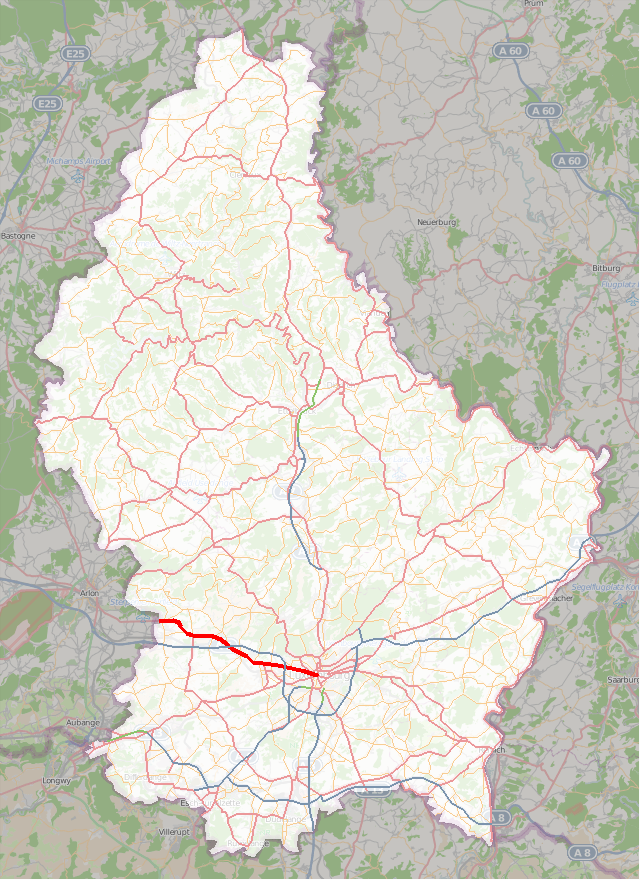

Route information
- Length: 17.7 km (11.0 mi)

Major junctions
- West end: N51 at Luxembourg City
- A6
- East end: N4 at Belgian border

Location
- Country: Luxembourg

Highway system
- Motorways in Luxembourg

The N6 is a road in Luxembourg. It connects Luxembourg City, at its eastern end, to the Belgian border. At the border, it connects to the Belgian N4, which leads to Arlon, Namur, Wavre, and Brussels. It is also known as the route d'Arlon (in Luxembourgish: Areler Strooss), due to its primary destination from Luxembourg City.

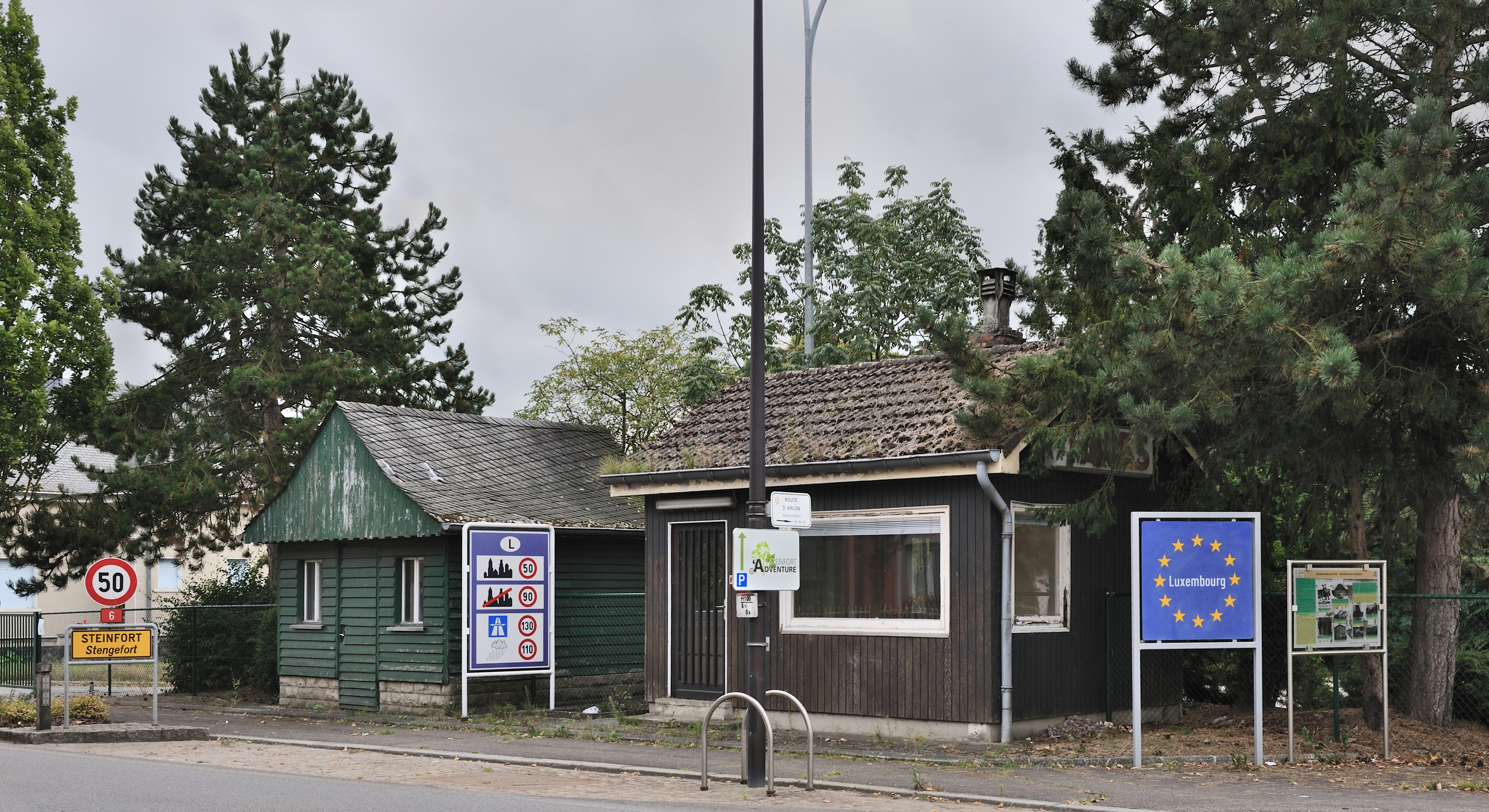
The N6 near Steinfort (the former Customs and Excise houses).

== Route ==
At its eastern end, the N6 meets the N51 (Boulevard de la Foire), on the edge of the Ville Haute district of Luxembourg City. On its way out of the city, the road passes Stade Josy Barthel, the country's former national stadium, and the Grand Duchess Charlotte Maternity Hospital, the country's main maternity hospital. On the outskirts of the city, the N6 meets the A6 motorway.

Once outside the city, the road passes through Strassen. The road proceeds to pass the Lycée Technique Josy Barthel in Mamer, before reaching another junction with the A6. Continuing westwards, the N6 runs through the towns of Capellen and Windhof, before reaching Steinfort, on the border with Belgium, whereupon it meets the Belgian N4.

== History ==
The N6 is a part of the Liberty Road, the commemorative way marking the route of the Allied forces from D-Day in June 1944.
