= Transport in Luxembourg =

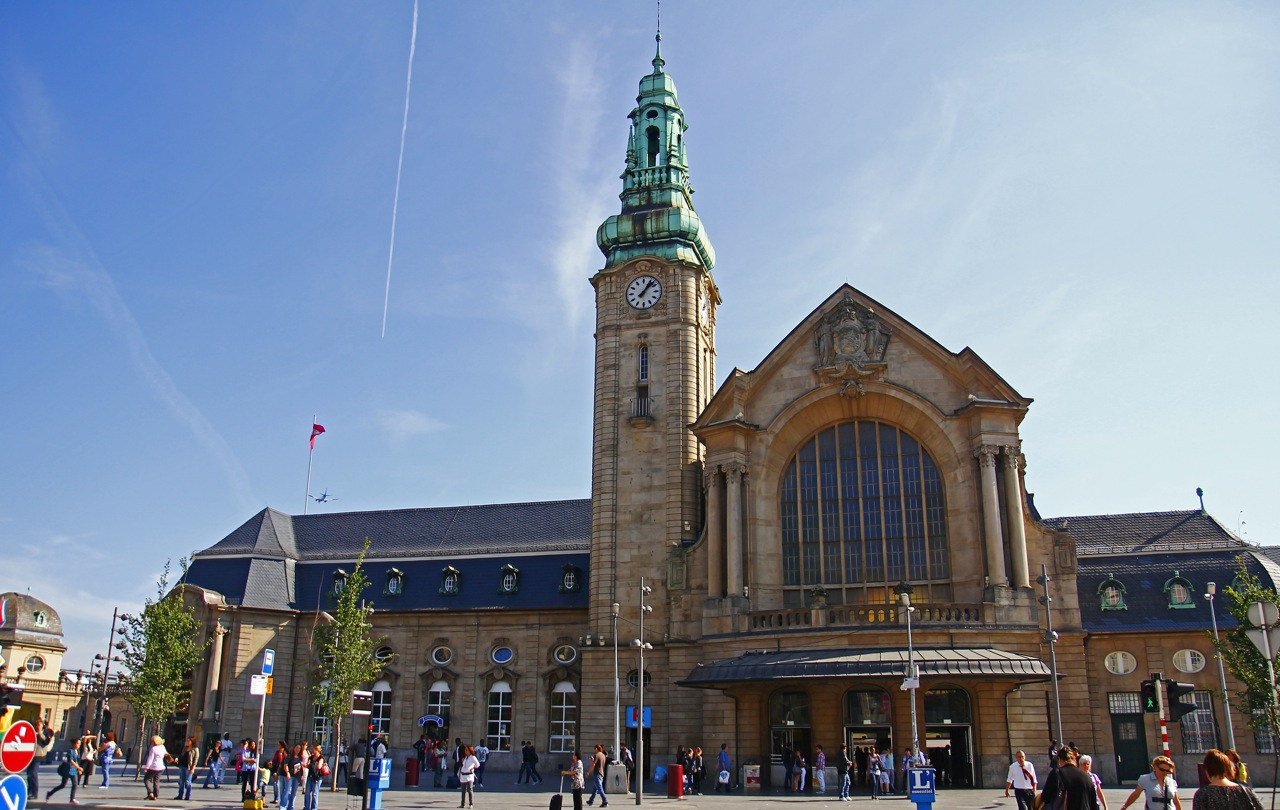
Luxembourg station is an important hub for national and international trains, city and regional buses, and the tramway.

Transport in Luxembourg is ensured principally by road, rail and air. There are also services along the river Moselle which forms the border with Germany. The road network has been significantly modernised in recent years with motorways to adjacent countries. The advent of the high-speed TGV link to Paris has led to renovation of the capital's main railway station while a new Schengen-only passenger terminal at Luxembourg Airport opened in 2017. Trams in the capital were reintroduced in December 2017 and there are plans for light-rail and/or tram-train lines in adjacent areas.

All public transport in Luxembourg (buses, trams, and trains) has been free to use since 29 February 2020, as part of a larger mobility experiment with goals to increase walking for short trips, bicycling, and transit ridership sharply as the network is enlarged and service frequency is increased. Most notably, the National Mobility Plan (PNM) 2035, drawn up by the Ministry for Mobility and Public Works in 2022, seeks to respond to a planned 40% increase in mobility demand within the country between 2017 and 2035 by strengthening public transport and bike path networks, and ultimately reducing the modal share of cars.

== Railways ==
Current national and cross-border railway network, connecting Luxembourg City with Luxembourg's neighbouring countries, north (Belgium) – south (France) and east (Germany) – west (France)

Operated by Chemins de Fer Luxembourgeois (CFL), Luxembourg's railways form the backbone of the country's public transport network, linking the most important towns. The total length of operational (standard gauge) track is 274 km (170 mi), though it was some 550 km (340 mi) at the end of the Second World War. There are regular services from Luxembourg City to Ettelbruck, Esch-sur-Alzette, Wasserbillig and Kleinbettingen while international routes extend to Trier, Koblenz, Brussels, Liège, Metz and Nancy.

The railway network links into Belgium, Germany and France. Some of the cross-border services are run by CFL, others by SNCF, NMBS/SNCB and DB.

A frequent high-speed connection to Paris via the LGV Est line opened in 2007. EuroCap-Rail is a proposed high-speed axis connecting Brussels, Luxembourg (city), and Strasbourg.

== Roads ==
=== Road network ===
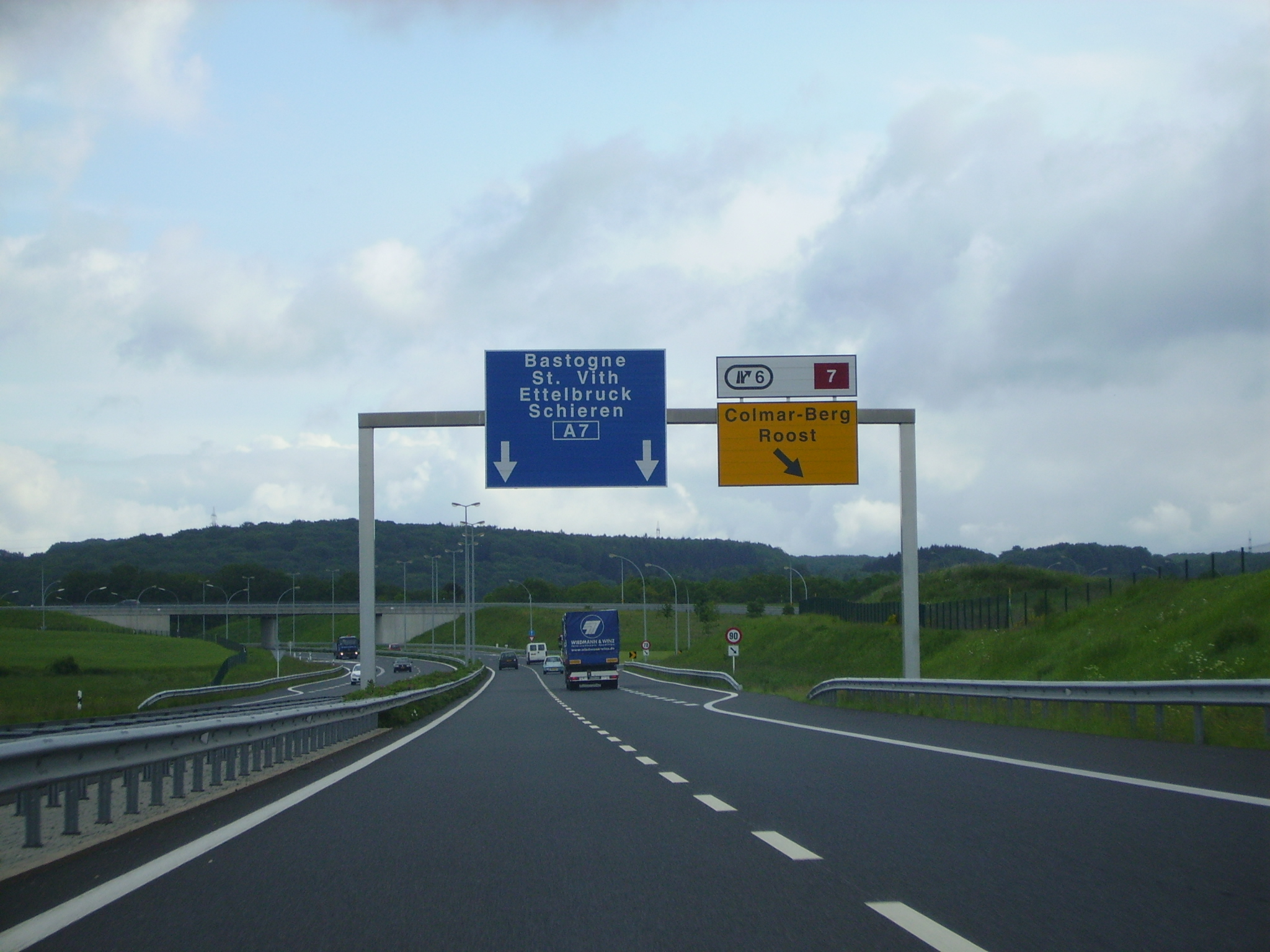
Luxembourg's A7 motorway

The six Luxembourg motorways cover a total distance of 165 km (103 mi), linking the capital with Trier (Germany), Thionville (France) and Arlon (Belgium) as well as with Esch-sur-Alzette and Ettelbruck in Luxembourg. Luxembourg's motorways are toll free. The speed limit is normally 130 km/h (81 mph), 110 km/h (68 mph) in rainy weather. With 56.8 km (35.3 mi) of motorway per 1,000 km^{2} (390 sq mi), Luxembourg probably now has the highest density of motorways in Europe.

Luxembourg City is a major business and financial center. Many workers prefer to live in the three neighboring countries and drive to work each day. This creates huge traffic jams during peak commuting hours. Tailbacks on the E411 motorway can extend five or more kilometers into Belgium and can take an hour or more to navigate.

The remaining road network in Luxembourg accounts for a total length of 2,730 km (1,700 mi), consisting of 839 km (521 mi) of trunk roads (RN or routes nationales) and 1,891 km (1,175 mi) of secondary roads (CR or chemins repris).

Evaluation of road km
Year (as of 01.01)	1990	1995	2000	2008	2012	2016	2017	2019	2022
	in km								
Roads (total)	2775	2820	2863	2875	2899	2908	2912	2914	2909
Trunk roads	869	869	837	837	837	837	837	839	850
Motorways	78	123	115	147	152	161	165	165	163
Secondary roads	1828	1828	1911	1891	1891	1891	1891	1891	1877

=== Bus services ===
Comprehensive bus services linking the towns and villages of the Grand Duchy of Luxembourg are contracted out to private operators by the RGTR (Régime général des transports routiers) under the Ministry of Transport.

Luxembourg City is served by 250 of its own AVL (Autobus de la Ville de Luxembourg) buses transporting some 40 million passengers per year (2018). 170 of these are, as with the RGTR, contracted out to private operators. Most of these buses are in AVL colors but the owner's name is often mentioned on them in small print. Also, the letters on the license plate can give ownership away to those that know how that system works. There are 31 regular bus routes plus special bus services through the night.

The TICE or Syndicat des Tramways Intercommunaux dans le Canton d’Esch/Alzette operates several bus routes. They are centered on the city of Esch-sur-Alzette in the southeast of the country. Most are urban and suburban routes but some extend into the surrounding countryside.

CFL, the Luxembourg railway company, operates some 17 bus routes, mainly serving towns and villages that are no longer served by rail.

A number of smaller cities like Ettelbruck and Wiltz have started their own local services, some of which reach out to nearby villages. These services are not part of the RGTR and national tickets are not always honored.

All transport companies work together under the Verkéiersverbond, which covers all bus, tram, and train routes. Starting from 29 Feb 2020, all public transport was made free throughout the territory of the Grand Duchy of Luxembourg, funded through general taxation. However first class tickets can still be purchased for use on the trains: a ticket valid for 2 hours is €3, whilst a one-day ticket is €6.

=== Cycling ===
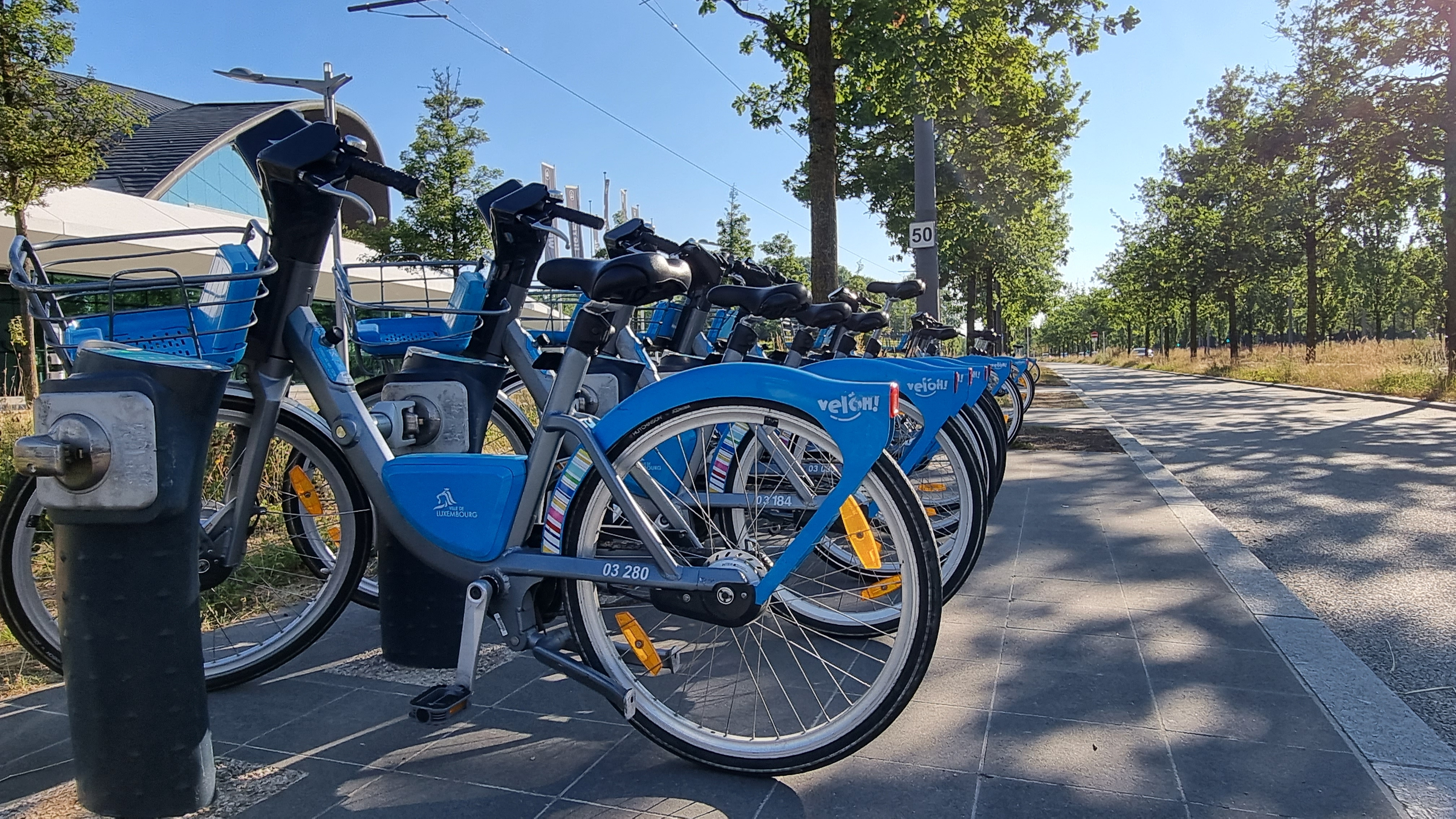
A vel'oH! bike-sharing station at the Coque, Kirchberg

In the Grand Duchy of Luxembourg, the EV5 Via Romea Francigena runs 107 km (66 mi) and follows a network of dedicated cycle paths from the Belgian border, through to its cliff-top capital city, and towards the French and German borders at Schengen. The EV5 follows the following national routes in Luxembourg: PC18, PC17, PC12, PC13, the Luxembourg-City route no. 10, PC1, PC11, PC7 and PC3.

In Luxembourg, the EV5 goes through Strassen, Luxembourg, Hesperange and Schengen. It then passes through back to France.

As of 2021, the modal share of bikes was 2% for daily trips made in Luxembourg, and 5% for trips under 1 km. The Ministry for Mobility and Publics works aims to make cycling the second-most used form of individual transport by 2035, with a modal share of 11%.

In 2008, Luxembourg City implemented its vel'oH! bike-sharing scheme, which is operated by the JCDecaux group. As of 2025, it has grown to encompass 144 stations across 8 communes, and a fleet of 1,157 bicycles, which have all been electric since 2018. At the same date, the scheme had 32,764 long-term subscribers (equivalent to nearly a quarter of the city's population) and an average of 140,000 rentals every month.

== Trams ==
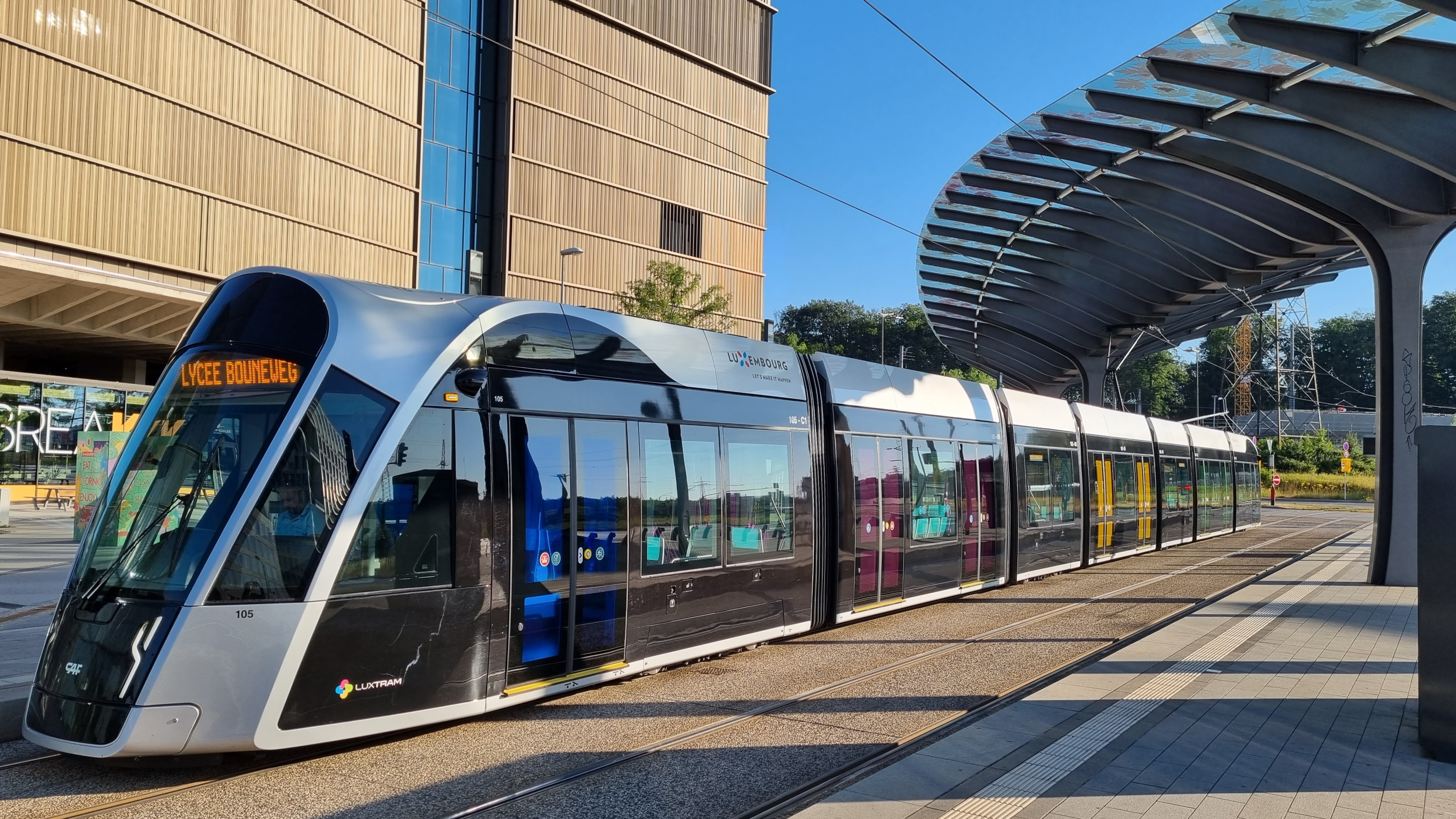
A tram in Luxembourg

Luxembourg City's historic tramway network closed in 1964 as part of a general decline of trams across Europe, but the city reintroduced trams at the end of 2017 with the construction of a new tram line (T1) opening in a phased approach. The final leg opened in March 2025. The line connects Luxembourg Airport to the EU institutions on the Kirchberg plateau, the city centre, Luxembourg Station, the new Cloche d'Or business district and national stadium. Additional lines are foreseen, both in Luxembourg City, and extending to Esch-sur-Alzette as part of Luxembourg's National Mobility Plan 2035.

== Water ==
The river Moselle forms a 42 km (26 mi) natural border between Luxembourg and Germany in the southeast of the country. In the summer months, the Princess Marie-Astrid and a few other tourist boats operate regular services along the river.

Mertert near Grevenmacher on the Moselle is Luxembourg's only commercial port. With two quays covering a total length of 1.6 km (0.99 mi), it offers facilities connecting river, road and rail transport. It is used principally for coal, steel, oil, agricultural goods and building materials. In 2016, the port handled 1.2 million tonnes of cargo.

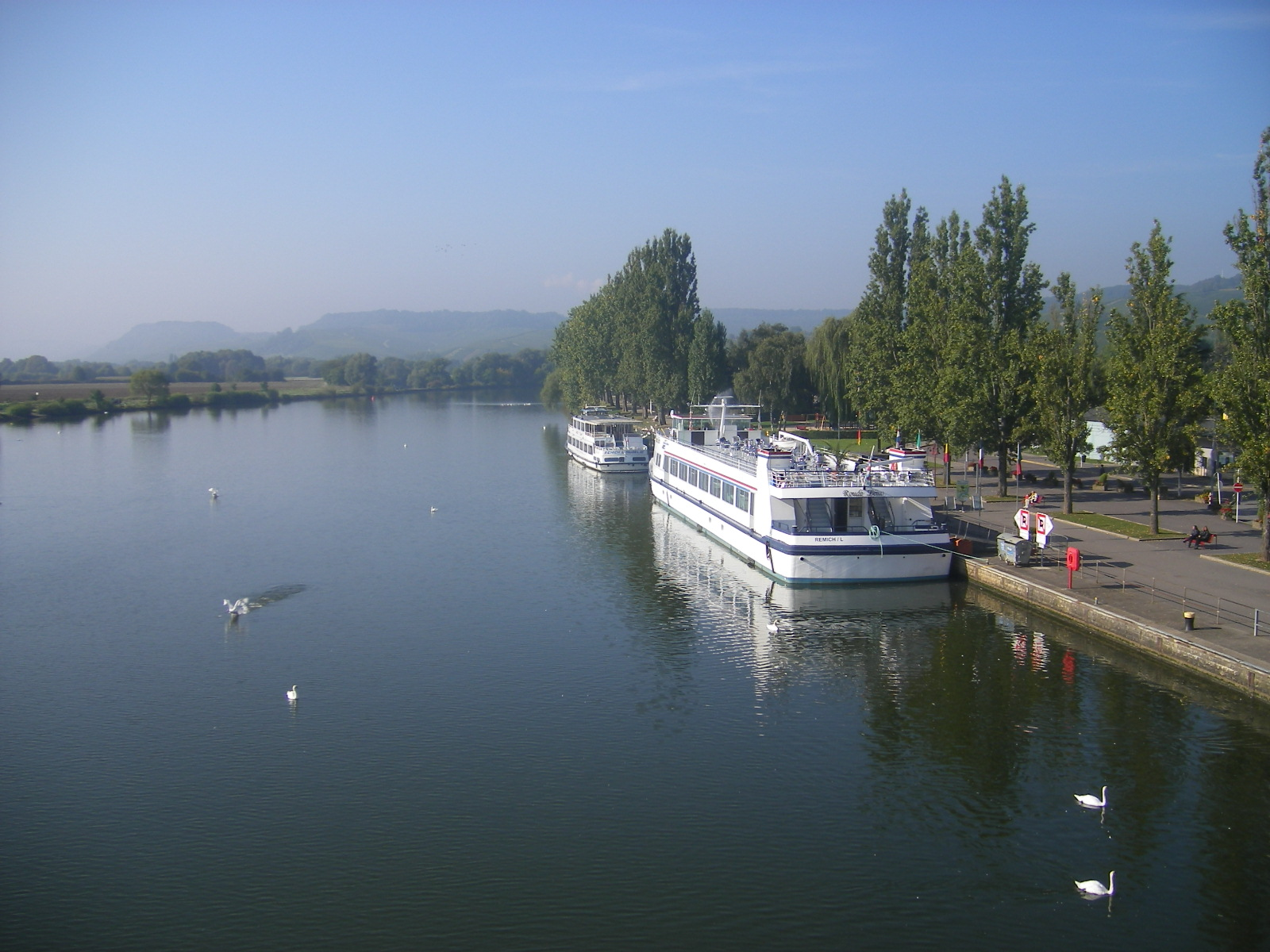
Moselle tourist boats at Remich

== Air ==
Luxembourg Airport at Findel, some 6 km (3.7 mi) to the north of the city, is Luxembourg's only commercial airport. Thanks to its long runway (4,000 m), even large types of aircraft are able to use its facilities.

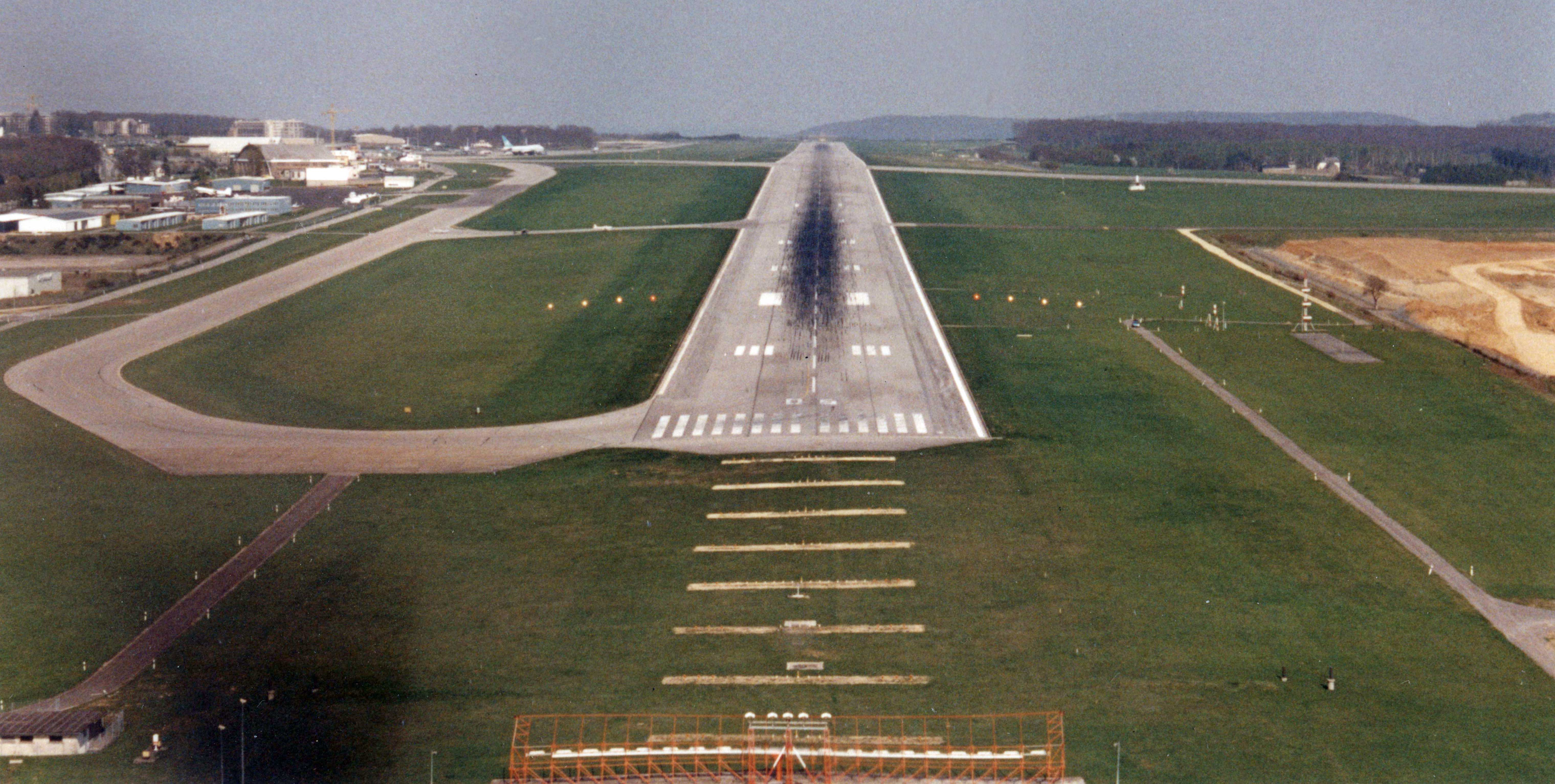
Luxembourg airport

Luxair, Luxembourg's international airline, and Cargolux, a cargo-only airline, operates out of the airport. In 2008, the airport ranked as Europe's 5th largest and the world's 23rd by cargo tonnage.

Luxair has regular passenger services to 20 European destinations and operates tourist flights to 17 more. Other airlines operating flights to and from Luxembourg include British Airways, KLM, Scandinavian Airlines, Swiss Global Air Lines, and TAP Portugal.

A large new airport terminal building was opened in 2008 with more modern facilities, including an underground carpark. In order to accommodate anticipated growth in travel within the Schengen Area, in 2016 an abandoned terminal was renovated to handle low-capacity and regional flights.

== Pipelines ==
The trunk natural gas pipelines in Luxembourg have a total length of 155 km (96 mi) (2007).

Russia and Norway are the main producers. The Luxembourg network is connected to Germany, France and Belgium.

== Merchant navy ==
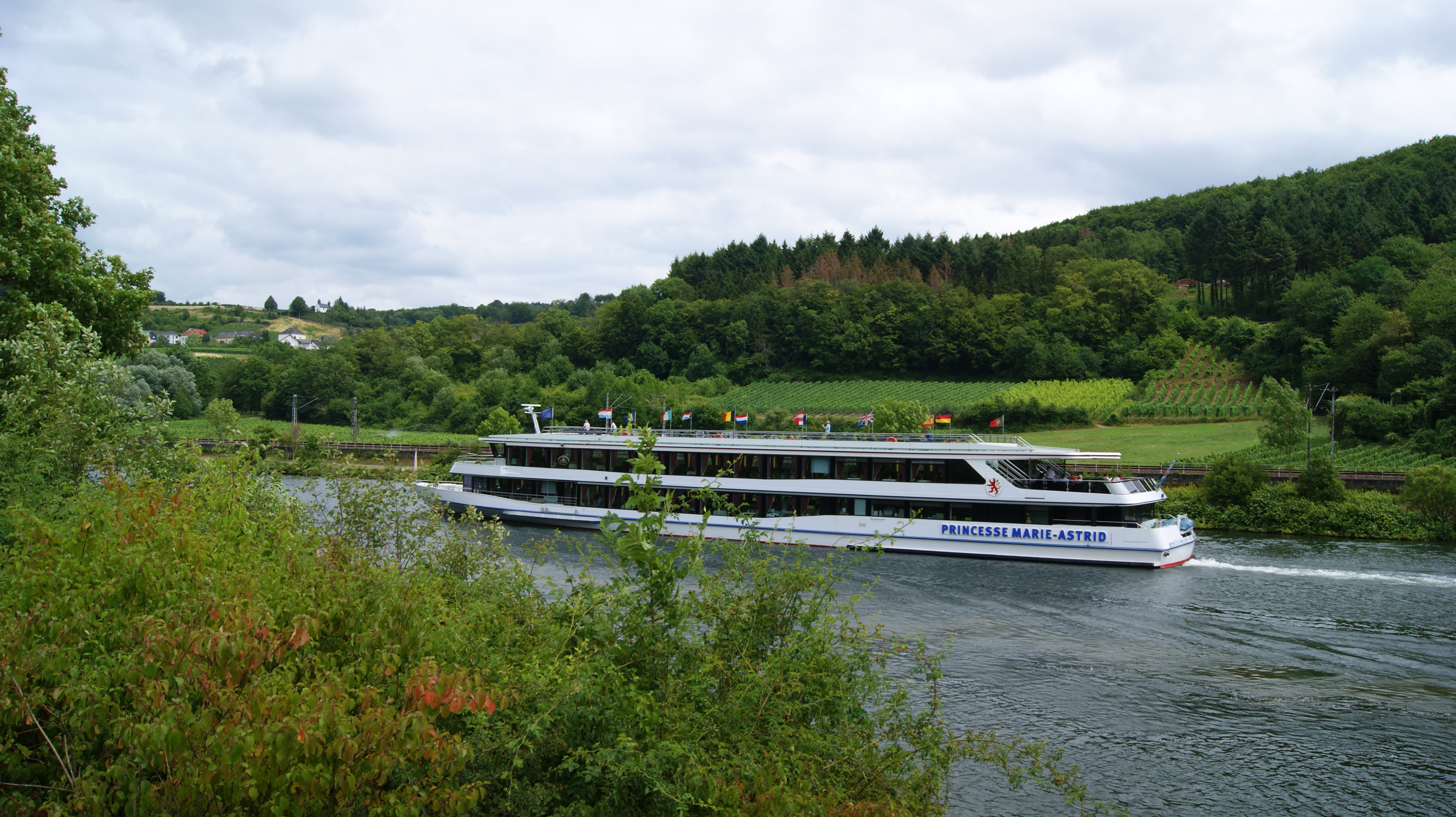
MS Princesse Marie-Astrid on the river Moselle near Ehnen

Luxembourg has 150 vessels in its merchant navy. These include 4 bulk carriers, 1 container ship, 21 general cargo ships, 3 oil tankers, and 121 others.

== See also ==
- The Integrated Traffic and Landscape Concept for the Grand Duchy of Luxembourg
- Plug-in electric vehicles in Luxembourg
- Trams in Luxembourg
