= A1 motorway (Luxembourg) =

Motorway in Luxembourg

Autoroute 1
- Autobunn 1
- Autoroute de Trèves
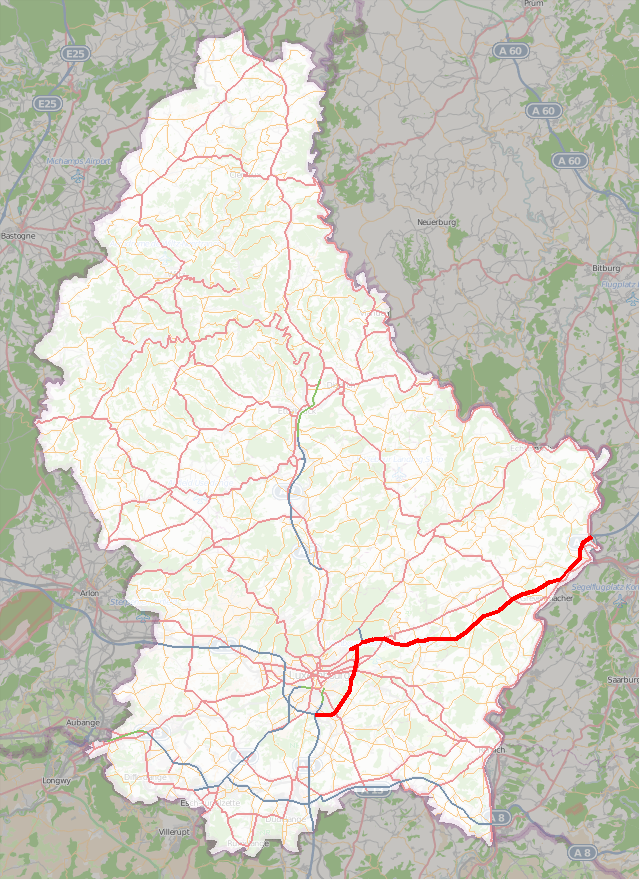

Route information
- Part of E44
- Length: 36.203 km (22.496 mi)
- Existed: 1969–present
- History: Completed: 23 September 1996

Major junctions
- Western end: Croix de Gasperich for Luxembourg City, A3, A6
- Kirchberg; Luxembourg Airport; Munsbach; Mertert; Wasserbillig
- Eastern end: (Germany); Sauer Valley Bridge & Bundesautobahn 64 for Trier

Location
- Country: Luxembourg

Highway system
- Motorways in Luxembourg

The Autoroute 1, abbreviated to A1 or otherwise known as the Trier motorway (Luxembourgish: Tréierer Autobunn, French: Autoroute de Trèves), is a motorway in Luxembourg. It is 36.203 kilometres (22.496 mi) long and connects Luxembourg City, in the south, to Wasserbillig, in the east. A few hundred metres to the north of Wasserbillig, it reaches the German border, whereupon it becomes the A64, which leads to Trier.

== Overview ==
Originally a connection from Luxembourg City to Luxembourg Airport, at Senningerberg, in 1969, the A1 was extended in three stages from 1988 to 1992 to connect to the German border. From 1994 to 1996, two more sections were opened, bypassing the south-east of Luxembourg City and connecting the A1 to the Croix de Gasperich, where it meets the A3 (to Dudelange) and A6 (towards Arlon, in Belgium).

In all, the A1 was opened in six separate sections:

- 1969: Kirchberg - Senningerberg
- 6 September 1988: Potaschberg - Wasserbillig
- 11 July 1990: Senningerberg - Munsbach
- 26 June 1992: Munsbach - Potaschberg
- 20 May 1994: Croix de Gasperich - Irrgarten
- 23 September 1996: Irrgarten - Kirchberg

== Traffic ==
In 2024, an average of 29,000 vehicles passed through the A1 motorway at its highest, leading into the town of Potaschbierg. In 1988, there were only about 5,000.

== Route ==
Junctions and structures
	Croix de Gasperich	A 3 / A 6
	Howald Tunnel
	Victor Bodson Bridge
(J7)	Hamm / Sandweiler	N 2
	Cents Tunnel
	Neudorf Viaduct
/ (J8)	Kirchberg / Grunewald Junction	N 51 / A 7
(J9)	Senningerberg / Airport
(J10)	Cargo Centre
(J11)	Munsbach
	Syre Viaduct
(J12)	Flaxweiler
(J13)	Potaschbierg	N 1
(J14)	Mertert
(J15)	Wasserbillig
/	Wasserbillig services
(Germany)	Border with Germany	A 64
