= Langsur =

- Municipality
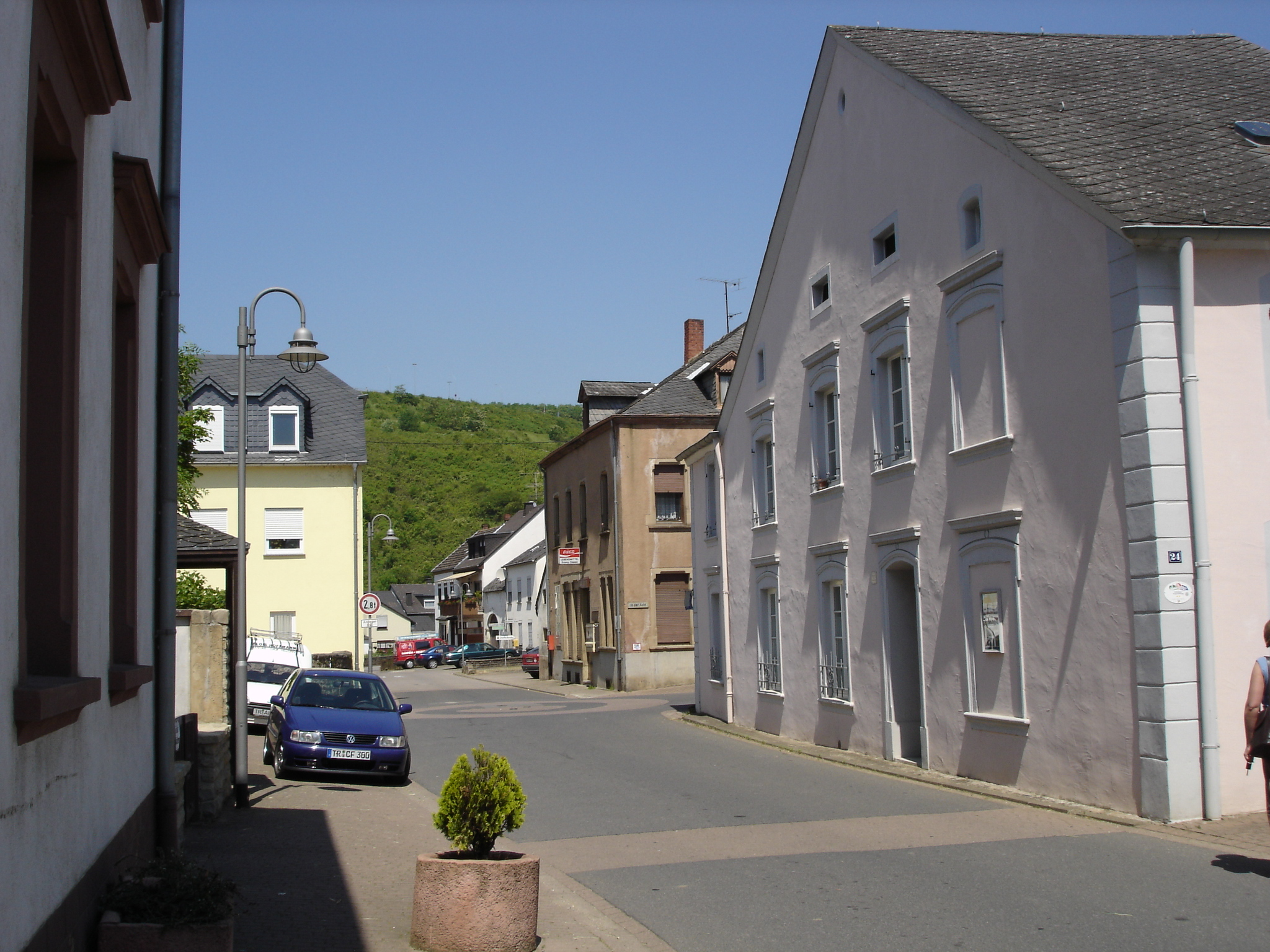

- Coat of arms

- Location of Langsur within Trier-Saarburg district
- Interactive map of Langsur
- Location within Germany Location within Rhineland-Palatinate
- Coordinates: 49°43′29″N 6°29′59″E
- Country: Germany
- State: Rhineland-Palatinate
- District: Trier-Saarburg
- Municipal assoc.: Trier-Land

Government
  - Mayor (2019–24): Reinhold Thiel

Area
  - Total: 11.93 km^{2} (4.61 sq mi)
- Elevation: 154 m (505 ft)

Population (2025-12-31)
  - Total: 1,707
  - Density: 143.1/km^{2} (370.6/sq mi)
- Time zone: UTC+01:00 (CET)
  - Summer (DST): UTC+02:00 (CEST)
- Postal codes: 54308
- Dialling codes: 06501
- Vehicle registration: TR
- Website: www.langsur.info

Langsur is a municipality in the Trier-Saarburg district, in Rhineland-Palatinate, Germany.

== Mesenich ==
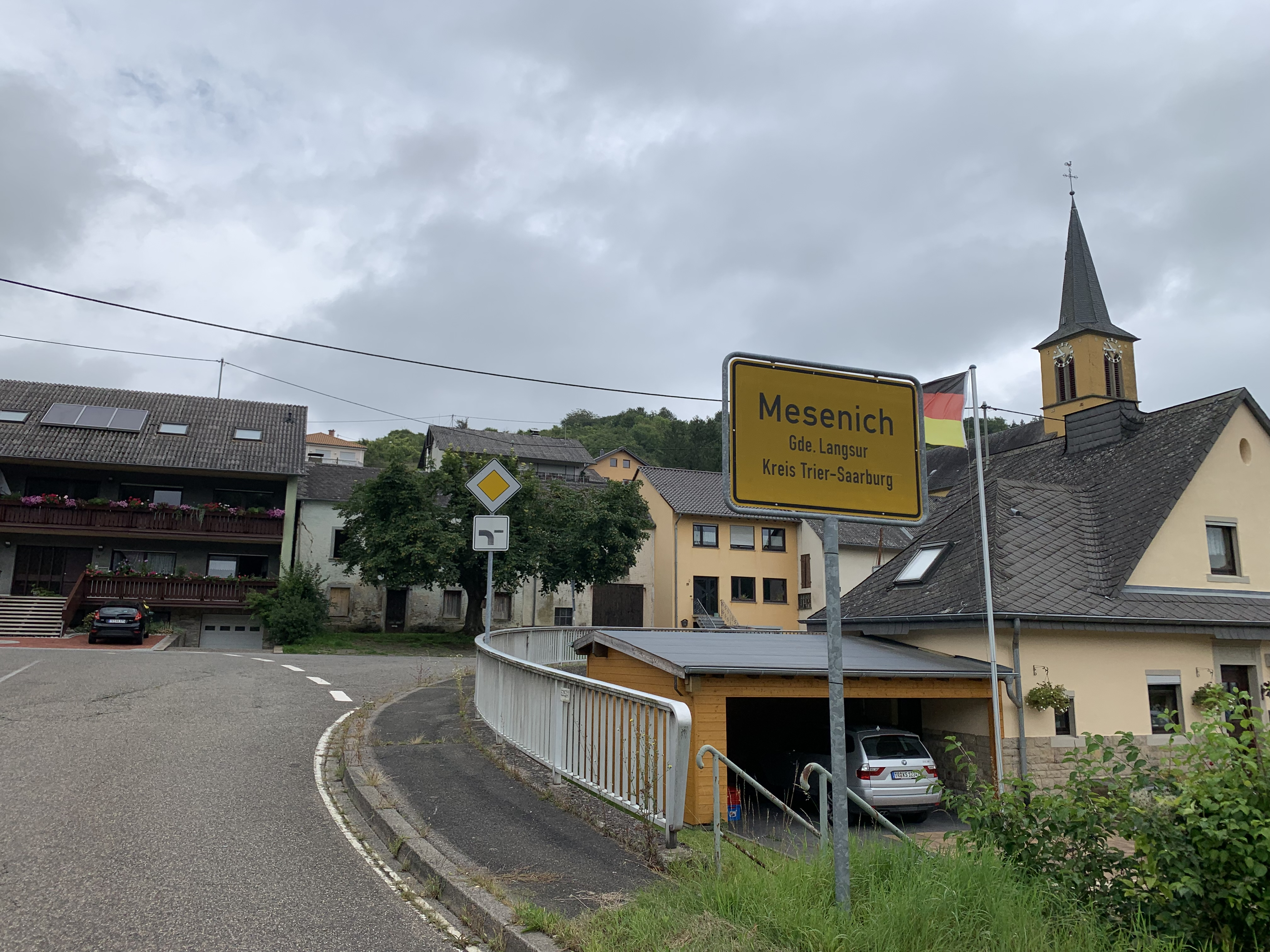

Mesenich is a small German village belonging to the Ortsgemeinde of Langsur. It is located on the north of the verbandsgemeinde, near the Sauertalbrücke, the bridge in which the Bundesautobahn 64, the motorway connecting Luxembourg City and Trier, crosses the Sauer. It is also near a solar park and a natural rock mine.

== Wasserbilligerbrück ==
Wasserbilligerbrück is another small German village belonging to the Ortsgemeinde of Langsur. It is located on the bridge across the Sauer connecting it to the Luxembourgish town of Wasserbillig.
