= N239 road (Belgium) =

Highway in Belgium

Coordinates: 50.26662°N 5.24787°E

National Route 239
- Dutch: Nationale Weg 239; French: Route nationale 239

Major junctions
- From: Ottignies
- Ottignies N237; Ottignies N238a; Wavre A4 E411; Wavre N4
- To: Wavre

Location
- Country: Belgium

Highway system
- Highways of Belgium; Motorways; National Roads

The N239 road in Belgium is a national road connecting Ottignies to Wavre via Limal.

== See also ==
- Province of Wallon_Brabant
