= List of motorways in Luxembourg =

Motorway sign from Luxembourg.

There are six motorways in Luxembourg, forming the backbone of road infrastructure in Luxembourg. Five of them extend radially from Luxembourg City, in southern Luxembourg, the centre of the transport network of the country.

The six motorways have a total length of 165 kilometres (103 mi). For cars, the speed limit is 130 kilometres per hour (81 mph), reduced to 110 kilometres per hour (68 mph) in rain. During summer, due to heat the speed can be reduced to 90 kilometres per hour (56 mph).

== History ==
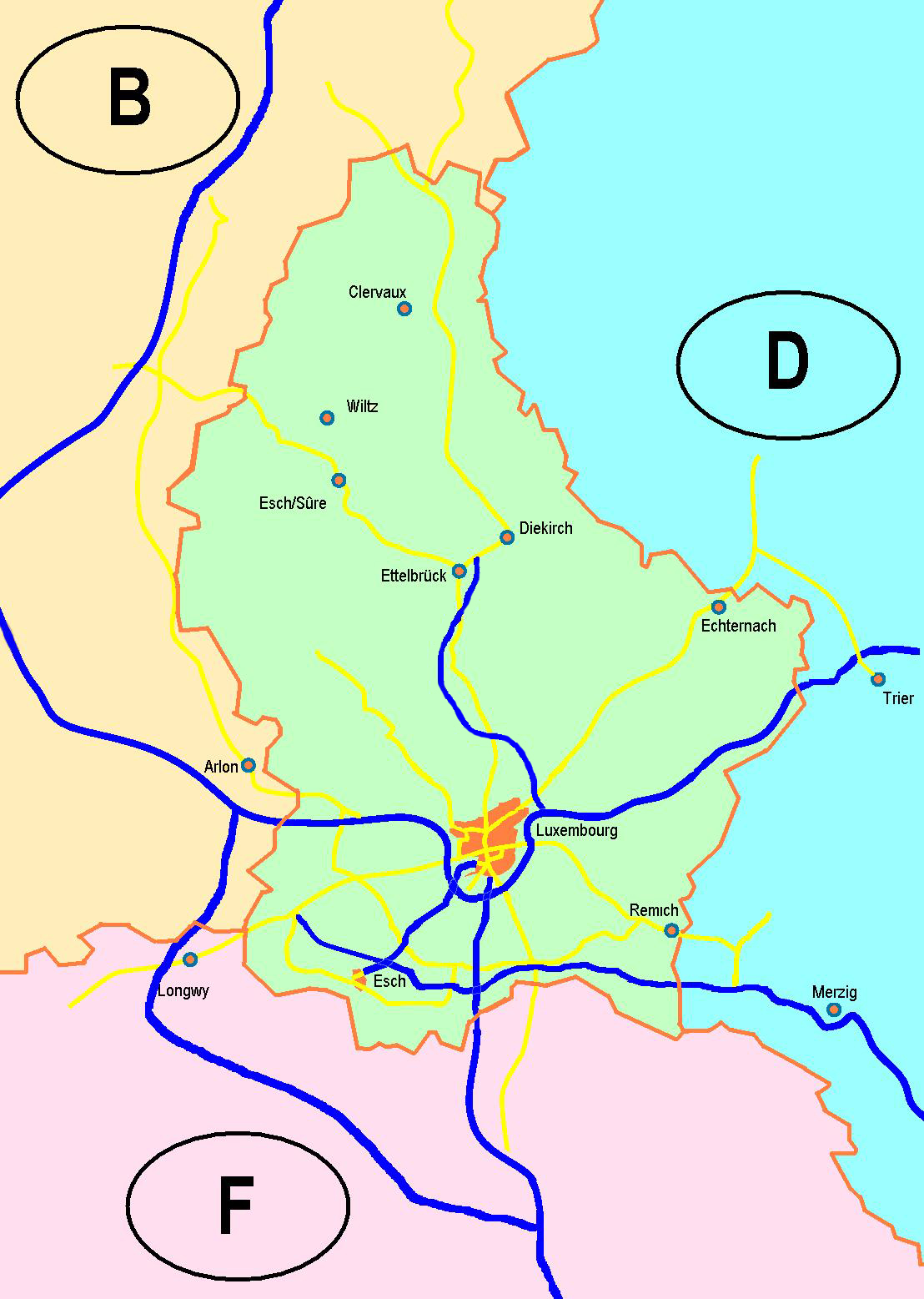
Motorway network in the Grand Duchy of Luxembourg

In the Grand Duchy, the development of motorway projects had its beginnings in the late 1960s. The first sections made were the Kirchberg - Senningerberg sections of the A1 motorway and Pontpierre - Esch-sur-Alzette / Lallange sections of the A4 motorway. They were put into service in 1969, quickly followed by the A3 (Luxembourg - Dudelange) and A6 motorways towards Arlon.

In later 1980s and beginning of 1990s sections I to III of the A1 motorway to Trier (coming from the German border at Wasserbillig) were finalized, joining the A6 motorway by the Croix de Gasperich bypassing Luxembourg City in the south-east. The last completed is the A13 motorway oriented west-east between the Biff at Bascharage and Schengen, joining the new German A8 motorway.

In 2015, the last part of the A7 was inaugurated. It connects the north of the country in Schieren with the capital in Grünewald.

== Naming ==
The numbering of motorways is derived from the numbering of national roads. The first national roads were numbered according to the hands of a clock (around Luxembourg City), starting with the road to Trier, the road N1, until the road towards the North N7. With reference to this designation, the motorways are called A1 "Trier motorway" and A7 "Route du Nord".

== List of motorways ==
List of motorways
Road	Length	Start	Via	End	E-road
A1	36.2 km	Luxembourg City	Senningerberg - Flaxweiler - Mertert - Wasserbillig	Germany (A64)	E44
A3	13.3 km	Luxembourg City	Bettembourg - Dudelange	France (A31)	E25
A4	16.3 km	Luxembourg City	Leudelange	Esch-sur-Alzette	
A6	20.8 km	Belgium (A4)	Steinfort - Capellen - Strassen	Luxembourg City	E25
A7	31.5 km	Luxembourg City	Lorentzweiler - Mersch - Colmar-Berg	Schieren	
A13	42.3 km	Pétange	Bettembourg - Schengen	Germany (A8)	E29

== Regulations ==
Luxembourg road signs F,22

The highways A6 And A1 merge into one another and cross the entire country from the Belgian/Luxembourg to the Luxembourg/German border.

At the same time, these two form highways around the city Luxemburg the city bypass „Boulevard Contournement“. To the north, this half ring is supplemented by the one completed in 2016 A7.

All motorway exits are numbered sequentially (analogous to the system used in D, CH and F, unlike in A/CZ), The exits with the 1 are all in the area around the capital. The A13, which crosses the south of the Grand Duchy and is not close to Luxemburg runs, is numbered from west to east.

A applies on all motorways in the Grand Duchy of Luxembourg Speed limit from 130 km/h, in wet conditions the top speed is 110 km/h.

== See also ==
- Transport in Luxembourg
- List of controlled-access highway systems
- Evolution of motorway construction in European nations
