= Croix de Cessange =

Interchange in Luxembourg City, Luxembourg

Coordinates: 49°35′10″N 6°05′13″E

The Croix de Cessange lies on Luxembourg City's southwest bypass, at the junction of the A6 and A4.

The Croix de Cessange (French pronunciation: [kʁwa də sɛsɑ̃ʒ]; Luxembourgish: Zéissenger Kräiz, German: Zessinger Kreuz; all lit. 'Cessange Cross') is a motorway interchange in Luxembourg City, in southern Luxembourg. It is the junction between two of Luxembourg's six motorways: the A6, on the bypass around the southwest of Luxembourg City, and the A4, which connects the city to Esch-sur-Alzette. It lies in the Cessange district, in the southwest of the city, hence its name.

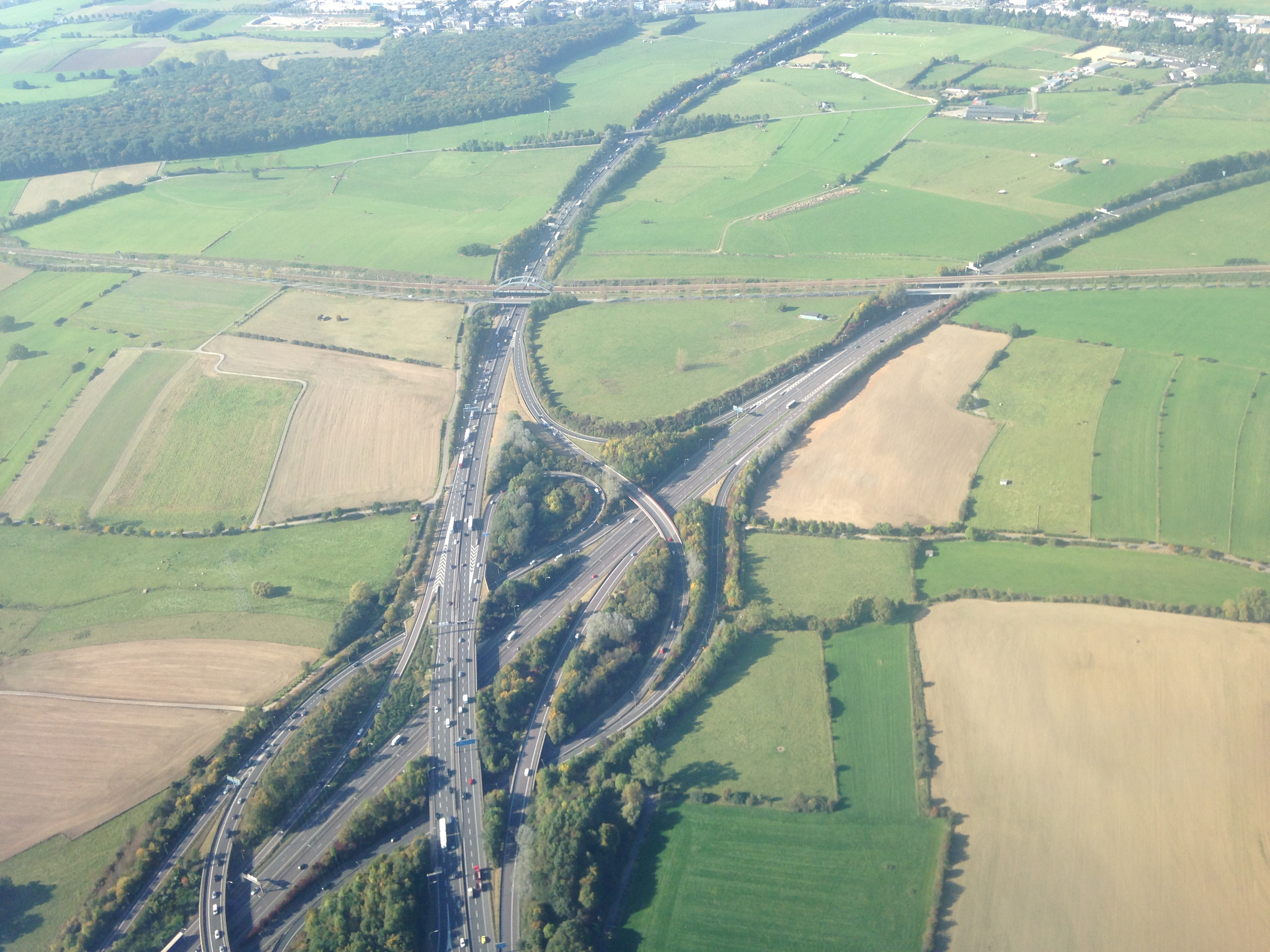
Aerial view of the Croix de Cessange
