= N51 road (Luxembourg) =

Road in Luxembourg

N51
- Nationalstrooss 51
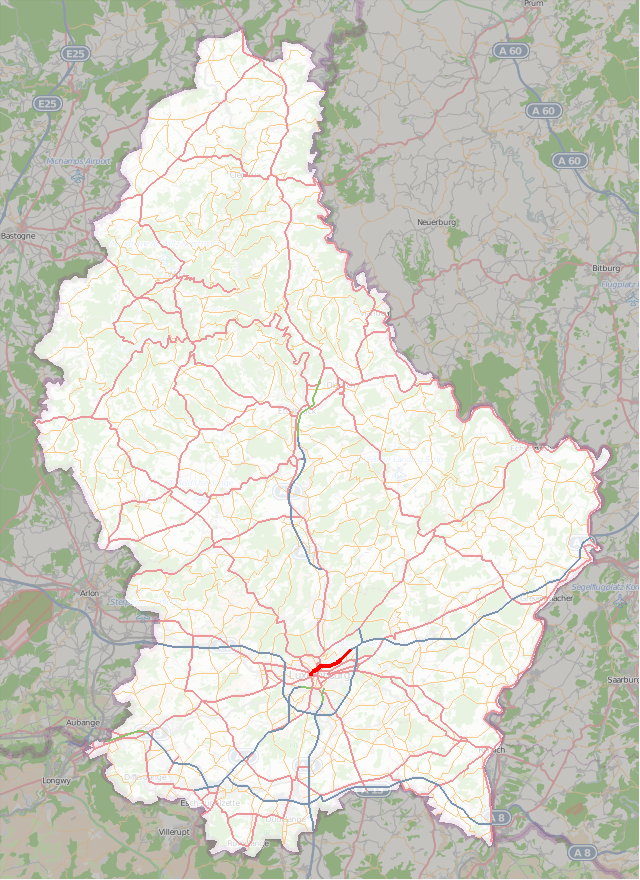

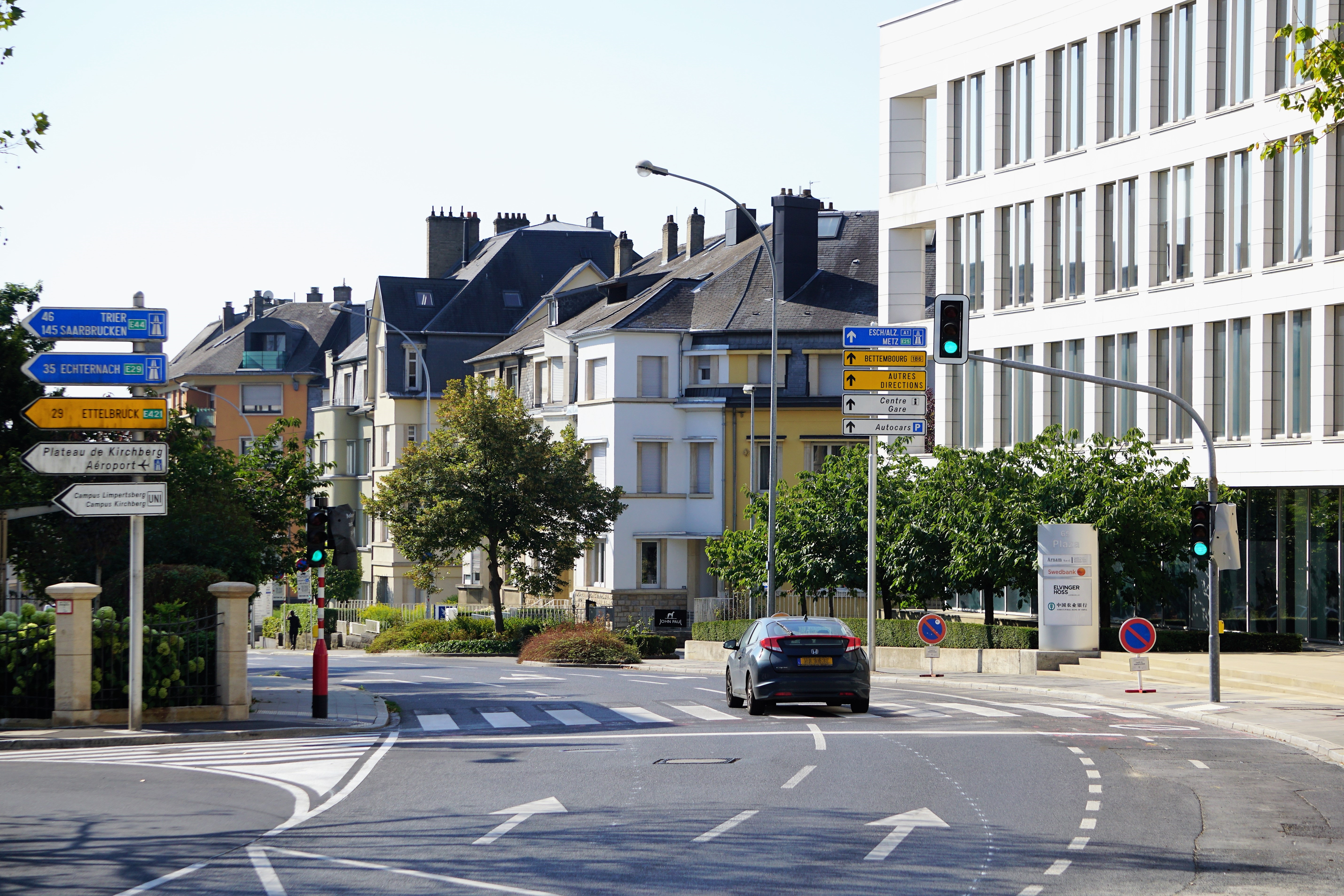

Route information
- Length: 6.2 km (3.9 mi)

Major junctions
- South end: N4 in Luxembourg City
- East end: A6 in Luxembourg City

Location
- Country: Luxembourg

Highway system
- Motorways in Luxembourg

The N51 is a road in Luxembourg City, in southern Luxembourg. It is one of the city's main thoroughfares, carrying traffic from Ville Haute, through Kirchberg, to a junction with the A1. For the north-eastern three quarters of its length, on the eastern side of the Alzette, it bears the name Avenue John F. Kennedy. West of the Alzette, it is successively named Boulevard Robert Schuman (after Robert Schuman); Boulevard de la Foire; and Boulevard Grand-Duchesse Charlotte (after Grand Duchess Charlotte).

At its southern end, in south-western Ville Haute, the N51 meets the N4 at an intersection. From here, it heads northwards, followed by northeastwards, skirting the western edge of Ville Haute. After bending almost a full right angle, it crosses the Alzette river, being carried over Pfaffenthal by the Grand Duchess Charlotte Bridge. On the eastern side, it reaches Kirchberg, where it is known as Avenue John Fitzgerald Kennedy, named after United States President John F. Kennedy. The road runs the length of Kirchberg, forming its most important arterial road. It passes several large buildings in Kirchberg, including the Robert Schuman Building, the Philharmonie Luxembourg, d'Coque arena, and the Kinepolis Kirchberg cinema multiplex. Near the city limits, the N51 meets the A1, which carries traffic eastwards, towards Germany.
