= Sauer Valley Bridge =

Bridge connecting Luxemburg and Germany

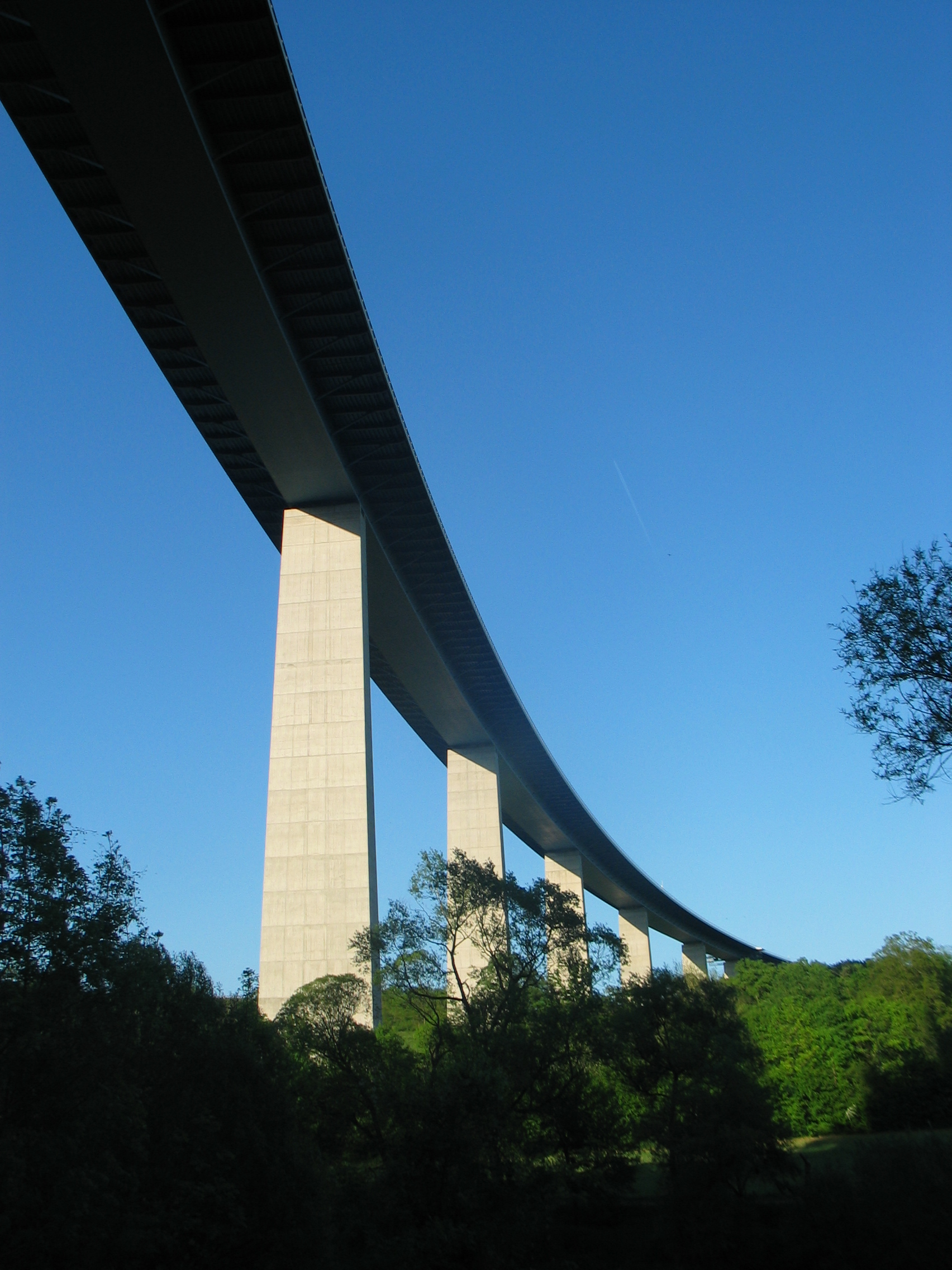
- Coordinates: 49°44′0″N 6°30′7.5″E
- Carries: A1 (Luxembourg); A64 (Germany)
- Crosses: Sauer valley
- Official name: Sauertalbrücke

Characteristics
- Material: Steel and concrete
- No. of spans: 6

History
- Construction start: 1984
- Opened: 1987

Location
- Interactive map of Sauer Valley Bridge

The Sauer Valley Bridge is a motorway (Autobahn) bridge high above the Sauer River which at this point marks the frontier between Luxembourg and Germany. It was constructed between 1984 and 1987.

The bridge is 1,195 m (3,920.6 ft) long and, at the lowest point of the valley, 98 m (321.5 ft) above the valley floor. Viewed from above it is formed as a curve with a radius of 2,000 m (6,561.7 ft). Additionally, the road surface has a constant 1% gradient. The girder bridge was built with a single superstructure for both carriage ways, and is positioned approximately a kilometer to the north of Wasserbillig in Luxembourg.

== Superstructure ==
The bridge has a steel superstructure of a constant level underpinned by a continuous support. The longest span between support pillars is 150 m (492.1 ft), which is the span crossing the river. On the Luxembourg side, traveling from west to east, the other span widths are 75 m (246.1 ft), 90 m (295.3 ft) and 125 m (410.1 ft). Two more spans on the German side are of 90 m (295.3 ft) and 75 m (246.1 ft).

The lateral profile of the bridge deck comprises a single box section 27 m (88.6 ft) and an Orthotropic deck inclined at 3.8%. The horizontal profile of the support floor is 8.87 m (29.1 ft) wide. There is therefore a difference between the thicknesses of the two sides of the bridge support which is 5 m (16.4 ft) on the inner side of the road's curvature, and 5.34 m (17.5 ft) on the outer side.

== Construction ==
Construction of the superstructure took place in 68 section. Each section was delivered as eight segments. The steel of the superstructure used the incremental launch method, employing a machine using 21 pushing devices. In order to be able to use this method over the long spans of the bridge without the need for temporary supports from below, a 58 m (190.3 ft) high cable bearing moving pylon was employed, mounted on the road deck and set 120 m (393.7 ft) back from the tip of the slowly advancing structure.

== See also ==
- List of international bridges
