= Croix de Gasperich =

Interchange in Luxembourg City, Luxembourg

Coordinates: 49°34′36″N 6°07′29″E

The Croix de Gasperich (Luxembourgish: Gaasperech Kräiz, German: Gaspericher Kreuz) is a motorway interchange in Luxembourg City, in southern Luxembourg. It is the junction between three of Luxembourg's six motorways: the western terminus of the A1 continues seamlessly as it meets the eastern terminus of the A6(the A1 and A6 combined cross the entire country from the Belgian/Luxembourg to the Luxembourg/German border.), whilst the A3 passes underneath the two on its way from Luxembourg City to Dudelange. It lies in the Gasperich district, in the south of the city, hence its name.
