= A3 motorway (Luxembourg) =

Highway in Luxembourg

Autoroute 3
- Autobunn 3
- Autoroute de Dudelange
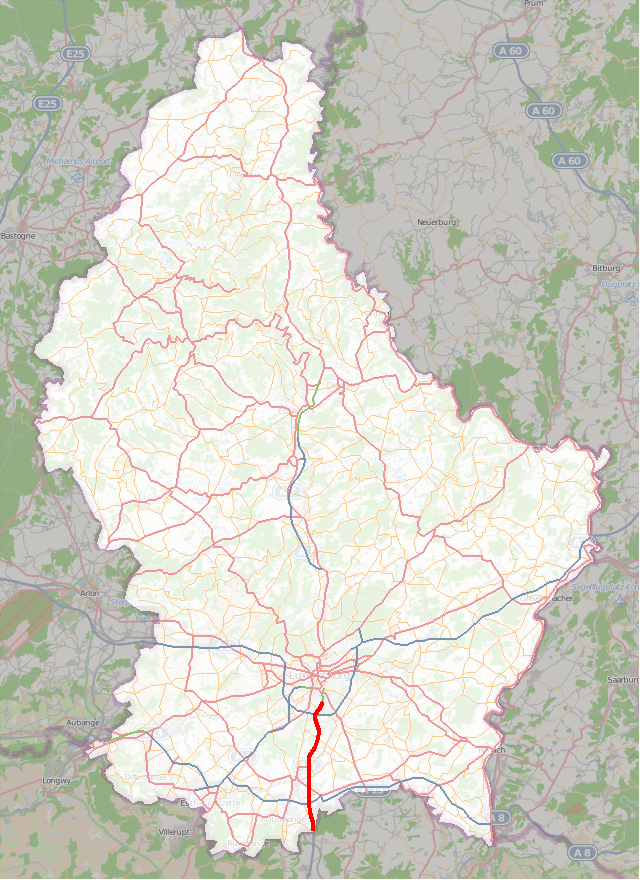

Route information
- Part of E25
- Length: 13.318 km (8.275 mi)
- Existed: 1978–present
- History: Completed 21 June 1995

Major junctions
- North end: Hesperange for Luxembourg City
- Croix de Gasperich; Bettembourg; Dudelange
- South end: (France) Autoroute 31 for Metz

Location
- Country: Luxembourg

Highway system
- Motorways in Luxembourg

The Autoroute 3, abbreviated to A3 or otherwise known as the Dudelange motorway (Luxembourgish: Diddelenger Autobunn, French: Autoroute de Dudelange), is a motorway in southern Luxembourg. It is 13.318 kilometres (8.275 mi) long and connects Luxembourg City to Dudelange. At Dudelange, it reaches the French border, whereupon it meets the A31, which leads to Metz.

== Overview ==
The A3 was opened in three separate sections:

- 1978: Croix de Gasperich - Dudelange
- 1981: Dudelange - French Autoroute 31
- 21 June 1995: Hesperange - Croix de Gasperich

The motorway has two lanes in both directions for its entire length, with the exception of a 1.3 km section on the northbound carriageway, where there are three lanes between the Livange/Bettembourg entry slip road (J2) and the Berchem service station entry slip road, where it again merges to become two lanes.

== Route ==
Junctions and structures
(J1)	Hesperange / Gasperich
	Croix de Gasperich	A 1 / A 6
/ /	Berchem services
(J2)	Livange / Bettembourg	N 31
	Croix de Bettembourg	A 13
(J3)	Dudelange
(France)	Border with France	A 31
