= Victor Bodson Bridge =

Coordinates: 49°34′46″N 6°09′13″E

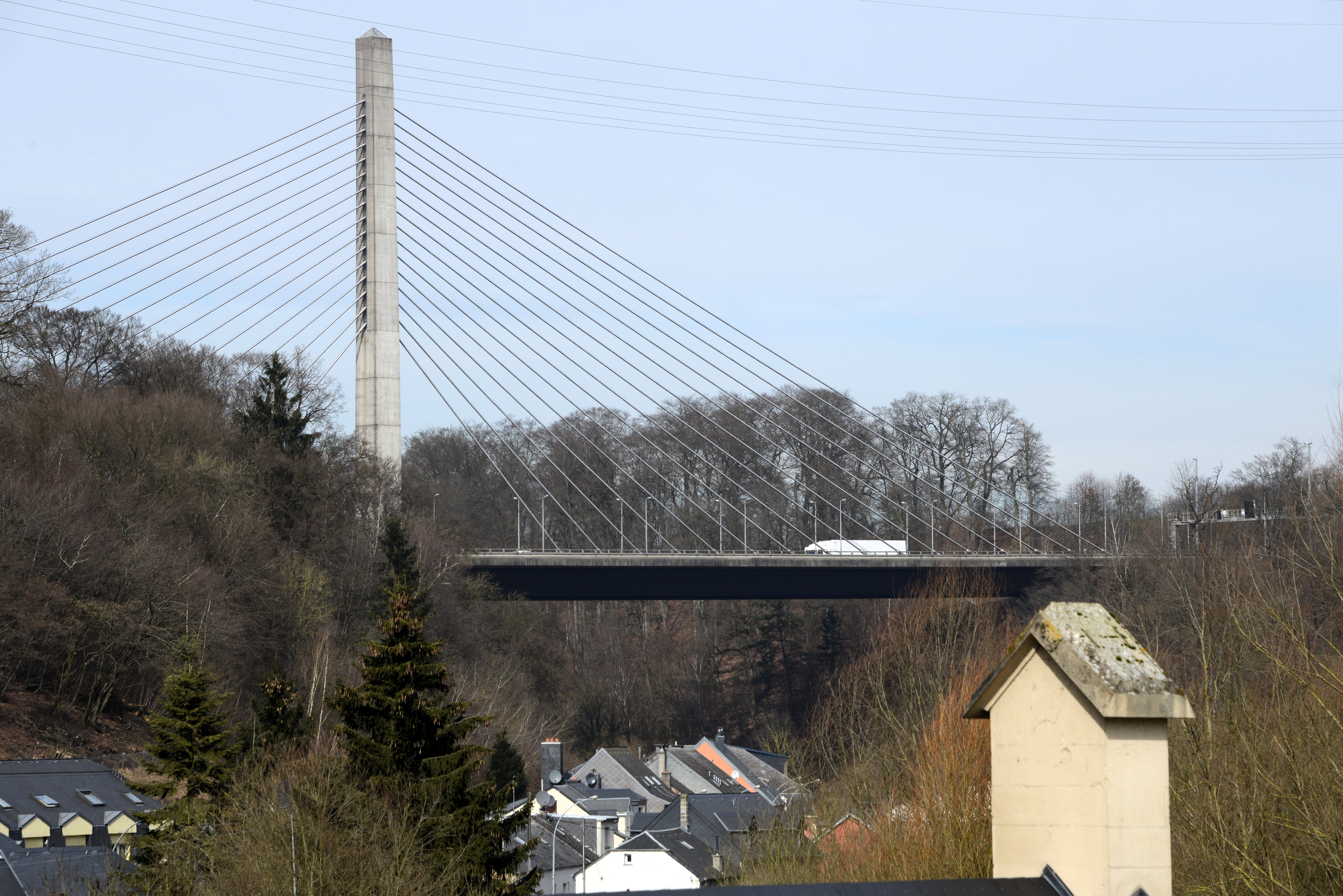
Victor Bodson Bridge

The Victor Bodson Bridge (Luxembourgish: Victor-Bodson-Bréck; French: Pont Victor Bodson; German: Victor-Bodson-Brücke) is a cable-stayed bridge in Hesperange, in southern Luxembourg. It circles the south-eastern suburbs of Luxembourg City, and carries the A1 motorway between Howald and Itzig, over the Alzette valley below.

The bridge was completed in 1993, as part of the extension of the A1 from Senningerberg (serving Luxembourg Airport) to the south of Luxembourg City. The bridge is 260 metres (280 yd) long, and stands 40 metres (44 yd) above the level of the Alzette below. The bridge is a total of 27 metres (30 yd) wide, consisting of two lanes running in each direction, separated by a central reservation, along with two emergency pavements. Because the valley under the bridge is inhabited, the design was limited to a single support pillar, located exactly in the middle of the bridge. The bridge is stayed by a single 61.5 metres (67.3 yd) suspension mast, located above the support pillar and from which radial cables fan out along the length of the bridge. Despite its reliance on a single mast for suspension, the bridge is notable for being curved along its entire length.

The bridge is named after Victor Bodson, a government minister in the 1940s and 1950s that held responsibility for Public Works, Transport, and Justice. He was also a recipient of the Righteous Among the Nations award for his participation during the Holocaust in helping Jews escape persecution.
