= Berchem, Luxembourg =

Town in southern Luxembourg

Coordinates: 49°32′N 6°08′E

View of Berchem

Berchem (Luxembourgish: Bierchem) is a small town in the commune of Roeser, in southern Luxembourg. As of September 2026, the town has a population of 1,353.

It is notable for being the nearest settlement to one of the world's largest retail petrol stations.
