= Wasserbillig crèche hostage crisis =

2000 hostage crisis in Luxembourg

Wasserbillig Crèche Hostage Crisis
- Location: Wasserbillig, Luxembourg
- Date: 31 May - 1 June 2000 (28 hours)
- Target: Children and educators
- Attack type: Hostage crisis
- Injuries: 1 (perpetrator)
- Assailant: Neji Bejaouti
- Verdict: Guilty, 22 years in prison
- Convictions: Kidnapping, rape
- Convicted: Neji Bejaouti

The Wasserbillig crèche hostage crisis occurred on 31 May 2000, when Neji Bejaouti, armed with a pistol and hand grenades, entered the Spatzennascht crèche in Wasserbillig, Luxembourg, and kidnapped 43 children aged one to ten and five educators.

== Details ==
Bejaouti, described by his attorney as "paranoid" and "a poor man with a weak plan", had lost custody of his children - who had attended the crèche - in 1994. He viewed this as an "injustice" that "needed to be corrected".

The crisis culminated in a swift resolution when two policemen, disguised as journalists, convinced Bejaouti to exit the building under the pretense of interviewing him. A police sniper seized the opportunity to shoot Bejaouti as he appeared with two hostages, an adult and a child. Bejaouti was critically injured, and none of the hostages were harmed during the assault. Following the intervention, all hostages were taken to a crisis center where parents awaited news of their children. The crisis, which lasted 28 hours, sparked national and international attention, prompting scrutiny of police tactics and the handling of hostage situations.
