= Berchem service station =

Service station on the A3 motorway in Luxembourg

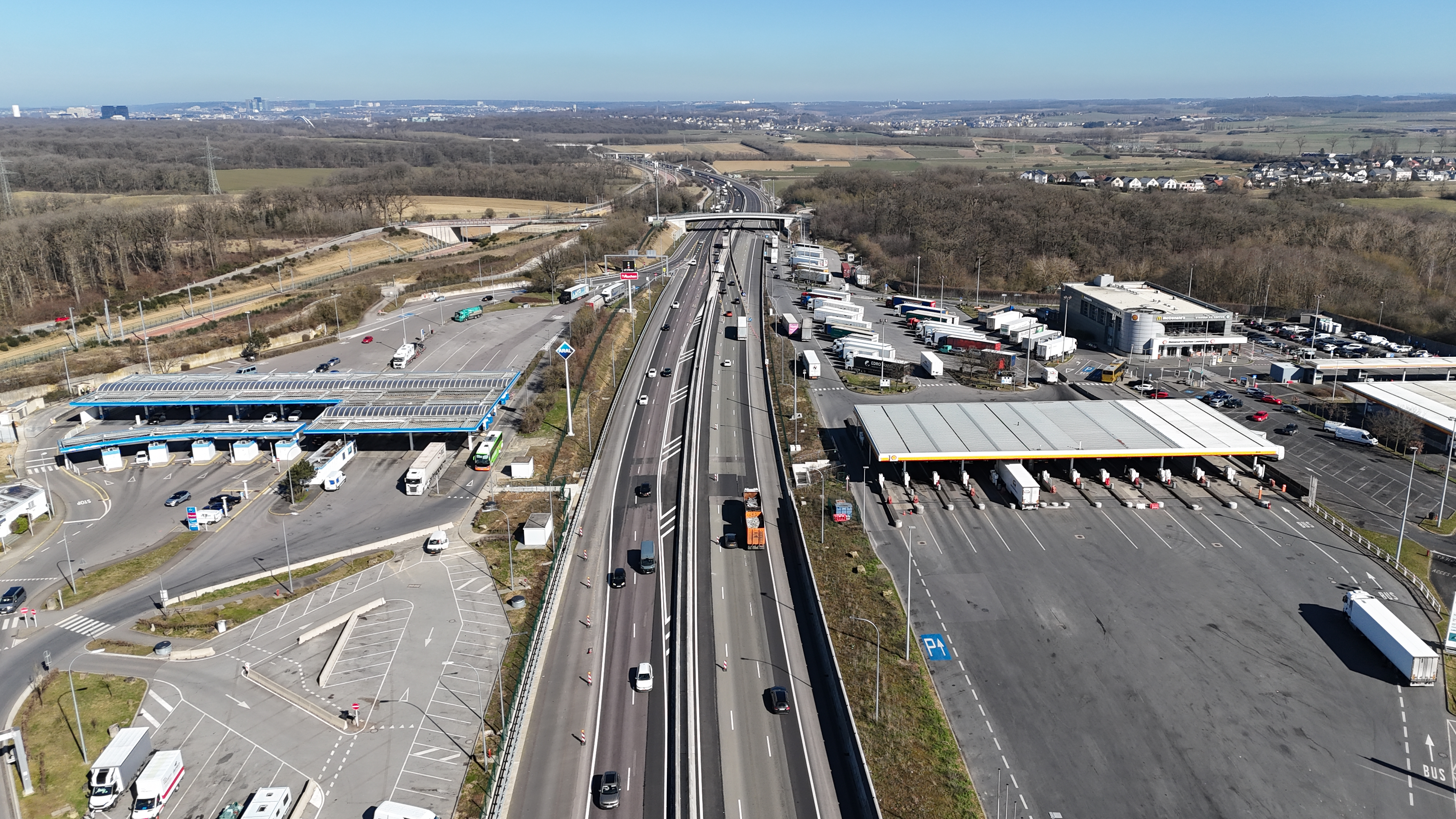
Aerial view of Berchem service station

Berchem service station (known locally in all languages as the Aire de Berchem) is a service station on the A3 motorway in Luxembourg.

It is located nearby the village of Berchem, 5 km (3 miles) south of Luxembourg City and 8 km (5 miles) north of the French border. The service station sits on the A3 route connecting the United Kingdom, Ireland and Benelux to eastern France, central and southern Germany, Switzerland, Italy and south-eastern Europe.

== Shell service station ==
The northbound fuel station at the services is the largest in Europe and the largest Shell fuel station in the world. It can serve up to 25,000 customers per day and sells 260 million litres of fuel per year. On average, 1,500 HGVs and 7,500 cars refuel there every day. Between 20 and 30 fuel trucks serve the station every day to replenish fuel supplies. It has 51 fuel pumps: 24 for HGVs and 27 for other vehicles.

There is also a small supermarket, McDonald's and a Starbucks. In 2025, the station got rebranded to Q8.

== Aral service station ==
The southbound service station is the largest fuel station of the Aral group. More than 1 million cars and 165,000 HGVs refuel there every year. There are 32 fuel pumps: 12 for HGVs and 20 for other vehicles. This service area has a supermarket which serves 850,000 customers per year and a restaurant which serves 500,000 customers per year.

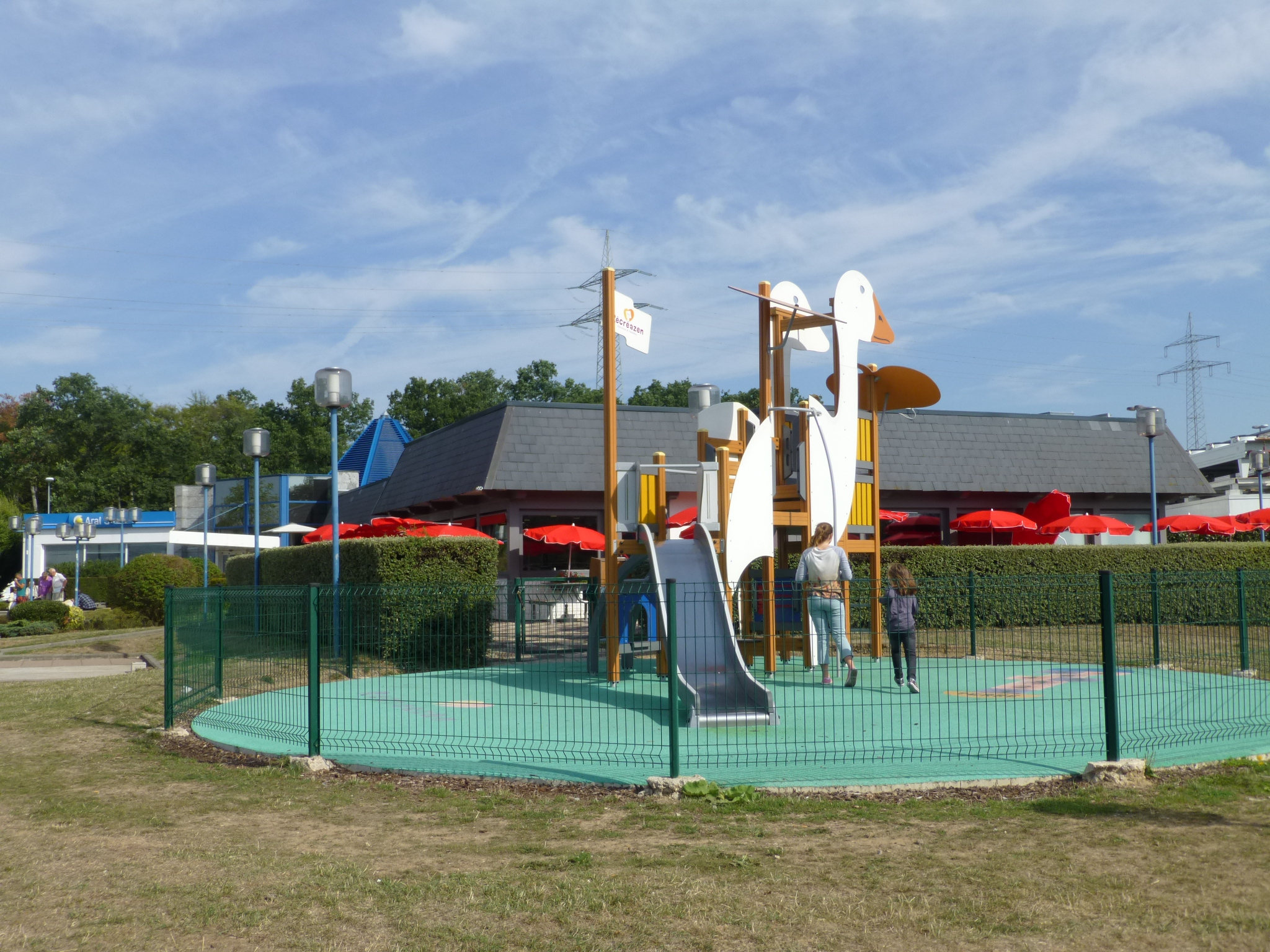
The playground of the Aral station side in 2015
