= A6 motorway (Luxembourg) =

Highway in Luxembourg

Autoroute 6
- Autobunn 6
- Autoroute d'Arlon
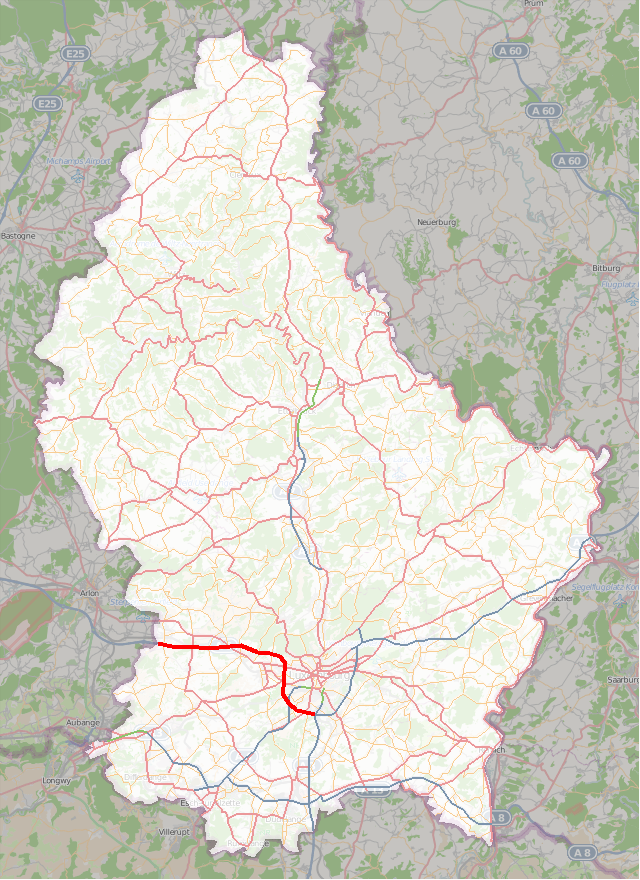

Route information
- Part of E25
- Length: 20.791 km (12.919 mi)
- Existed: 1976–present
- History: Completed in 1982

Major junctions
- North end: Croix de Gasperich for Luxembourg City, A1, A3
- Croix de Cessange; Strassen; Mamer; Steinfort; Kleinbettingen
- South end: Belgian Autoroute 4 for Arlon

Location
- Country: Luxembourg

Highway system
- Motorways in Luxembourg

The Autoroute 6, abbreviated to A6 or otherwise known as the Arlon motorway (Luxembourgish: Areler Autobunn, French: Autoroute d'Arlon), is a motorway in southern and western Luxembourg. It is 20.791 kilometres (12.919 mi) long and connects Luxembourg City, in the south, to Kleinbettingen, in the west. It reaches the Belgian border at Kleinbettingen, whereupon it meets the A4, which leads to Brussels via Arlon and Namur.

== Overview ==
The A6 forms part of the E25 from Hook of Holland in the Netherlands to Palermo in Italy.

The A6 was opened in three separate sections:

- 1976: Croix de Cessange - Strassen
- 1978: Croix de Gasperich - Croix de Cessange
- 1982: Strassen - Belgian Autoroute 4 at Kleinbettingen

== Route ==
Junctions and structures
(Belgium)	Border with Belgium	A4
(J1)	Steinfort	N 13
/ /	Capellen services
(J2)	Mamer	N 6
(J3)	Bridel
(J4)	Strassen	N 6
(J5)	Helfent	N 5 E44
	Croix de Cessange	A 4
	Croix de Gasperich	A 3 A 1
