= A4 motorway (Belgium) =

Motorway in Belgium (connecting Brussels with Luxembourg)

Coordinates: 50.212199°N 5.065549°E

A4
- Dutch: Autosnelweg 4 French: Autoroute 4

Route information
- Part of E411
- Length: 188 km (117 mi)

Location
- Country: Belgium

Highway system
- Highways of Belgium; Motorways; National Roads

The A4 is a Belgian motorway connecting Brussels and the A6 in Luxembourg. The motorway is part of E411 between Brussels and Arlon. This motorway, the longest of Belgium (188 km), is also nicknamed the "Autoroute de la Nouvelle Belgique" as opposed to the structuring axis Liège-Tournai (crossing an aging industrial zone). Indeed, the A4 connects rapidly developing centers such as Brussels and the city of Luxembourg, and it crosses economic zones full of vitality: the south-eastern suburbs of Brussels, Walloon Brabant and in particular Ottignies-Louvain-la-Neuve, Namur the new capital of Wallonia since 1986, and the country of Arlon.

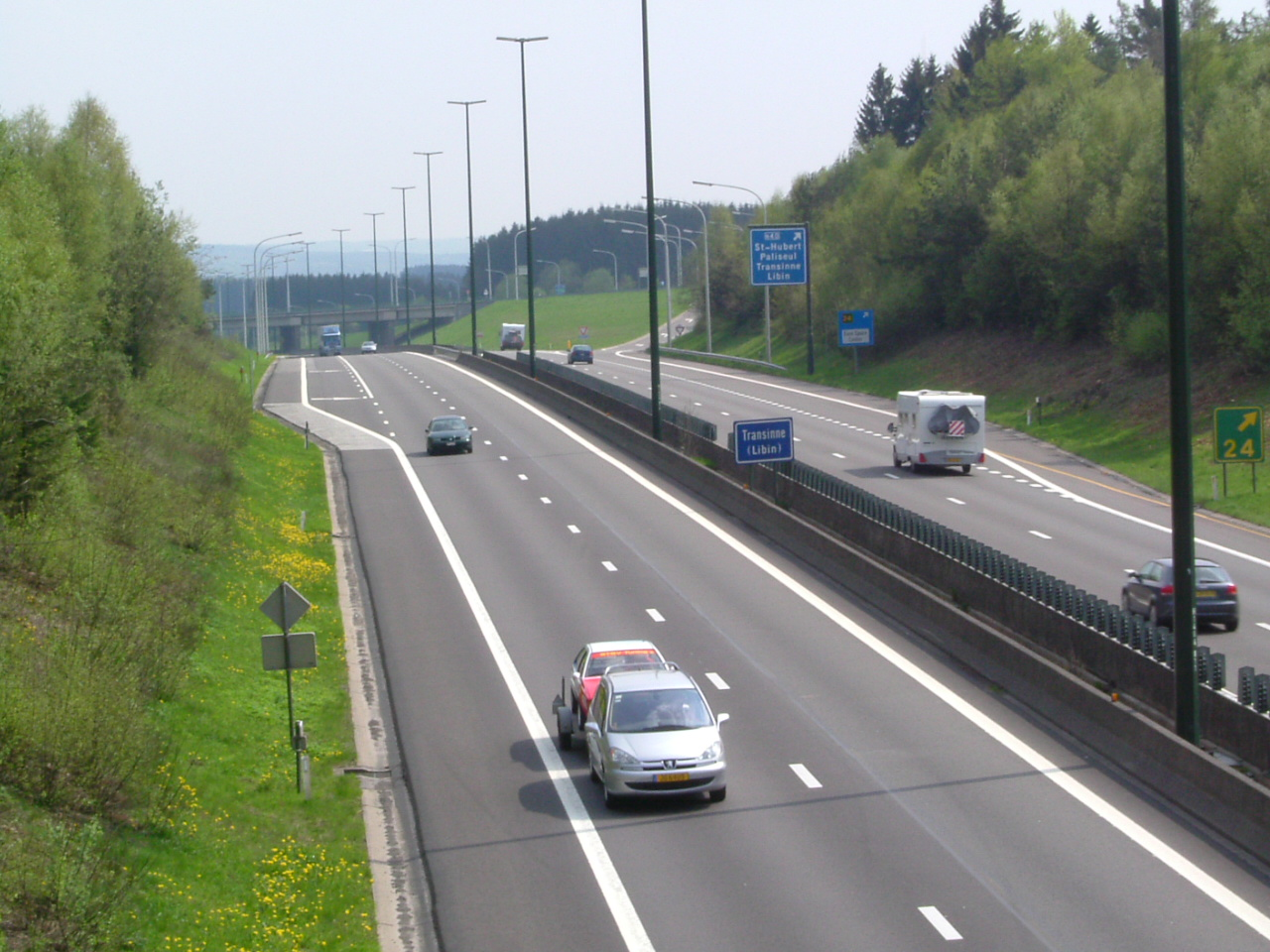
A4 close to Transinne

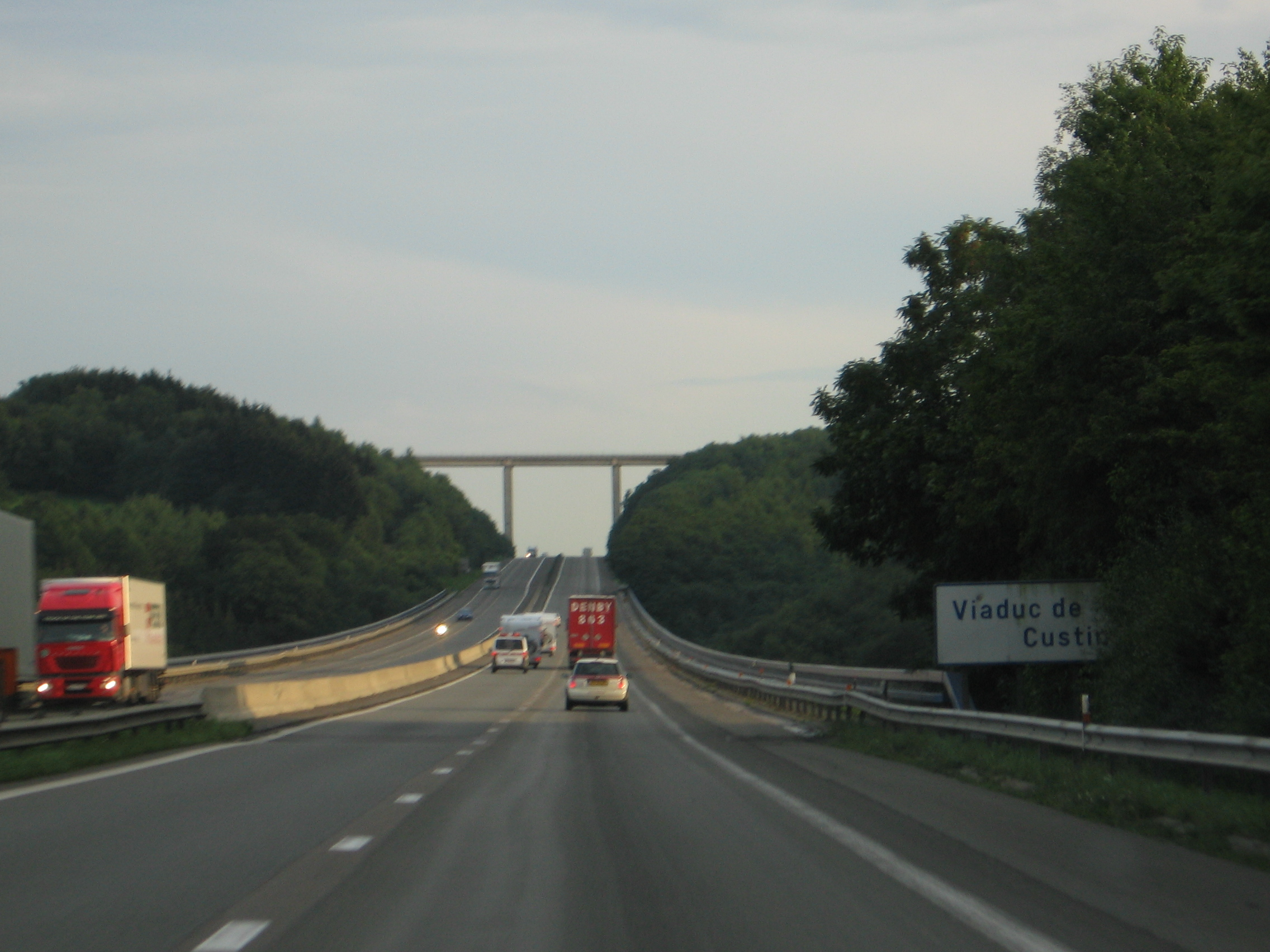
Bridge of Custinne

== See also ==
- Transport in Belgium
