= Gasperich =

District of Luxembourg City, Luxembourg

Gasperich Gaasperech (Luxembourgish)
- District
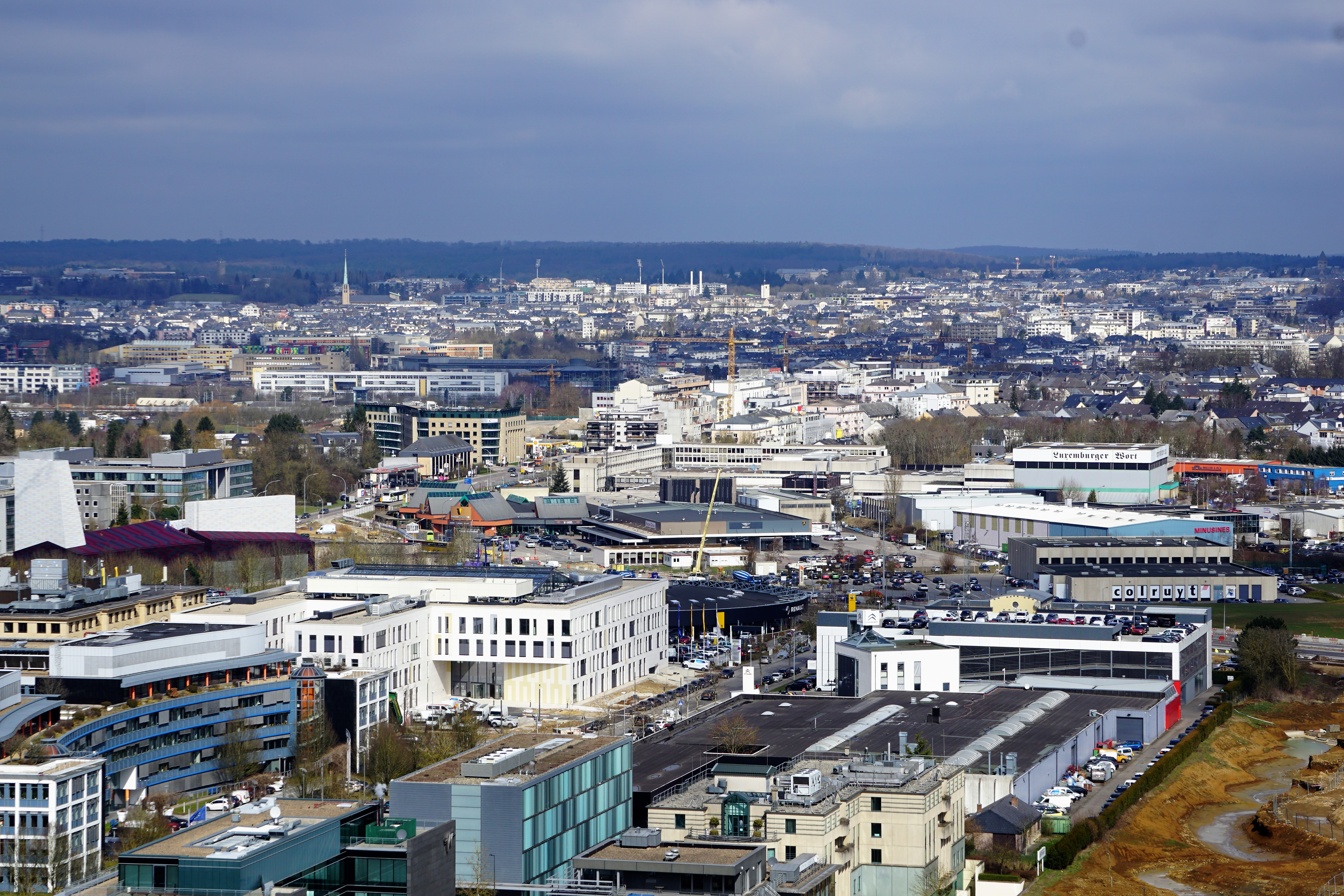

- Gasperich is one of 24 districts in Luxembourg City
- Country: Luxembourg
- Commune: Luxembourg City

Area
  - Total: 4.4514 km^{2} (1.7187 sq mi)

Population (31 December 2025)
  - Total: 10,282
  - Density: 2,309.8/km^{2} (5,982.4/sq mi)

Nationality
  - Luxembourgish: 29.14%
  - Other: 70.86%
- Website: Gasperich

Gasperich (German pronunciation: [ˈɡaːspəʁɪç]; Luxembourgish: Gaasperech, pronounced [ˈɡaːspəʀəɕ]) is a district in southern Luxembourg City, in southern Luxembourg.

As of 31 December 2025, the district has a population of 10,282 inhabitants.

In 2017, major building works began on a new development providing for dozens of large office buildings, hundreds of residences and a new shopping centre with various worldwide known shops and Auchan hypermarket.

== Transportation ==
Gasperich is served by several city, regional and international bus lines. Just over the municipal boundary lies Howald railway station, which was reopened in December 2017 and offers direct services to Luxembourg City, Esch-sur-Alzette, Bettembourg, Wasserbillig, Troisvierges, Thionville, Metz and Nancy, among others.

Gasperich is served by two Park and Ride car parks: P+R Kockelscheuer, with 552 spaces; and P+R Luxembourg-Sud, with 811 spaces.
