= Sauer =

River in Belgium, Luxembourg and Germany

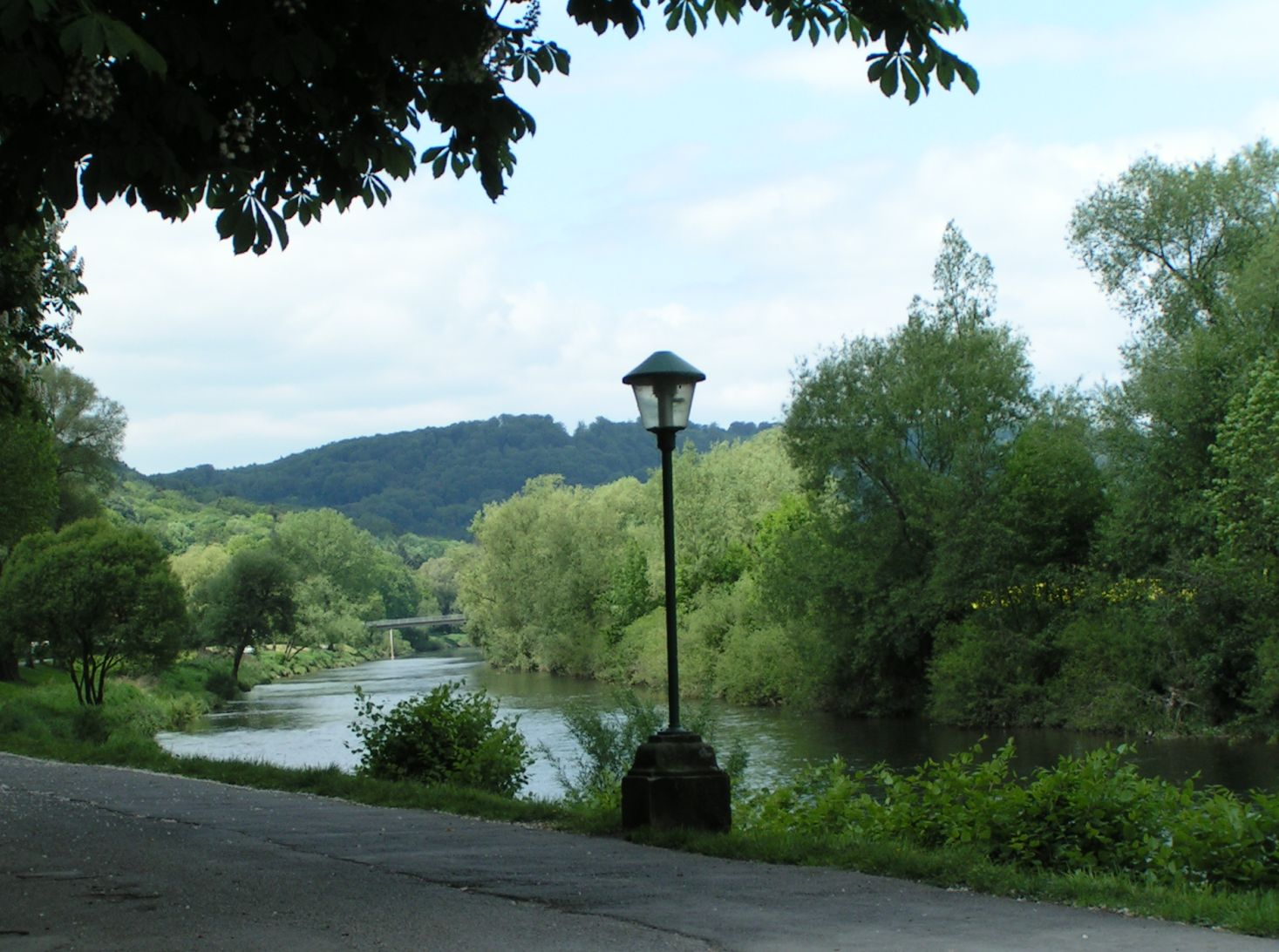
- The Sauer in Echternach

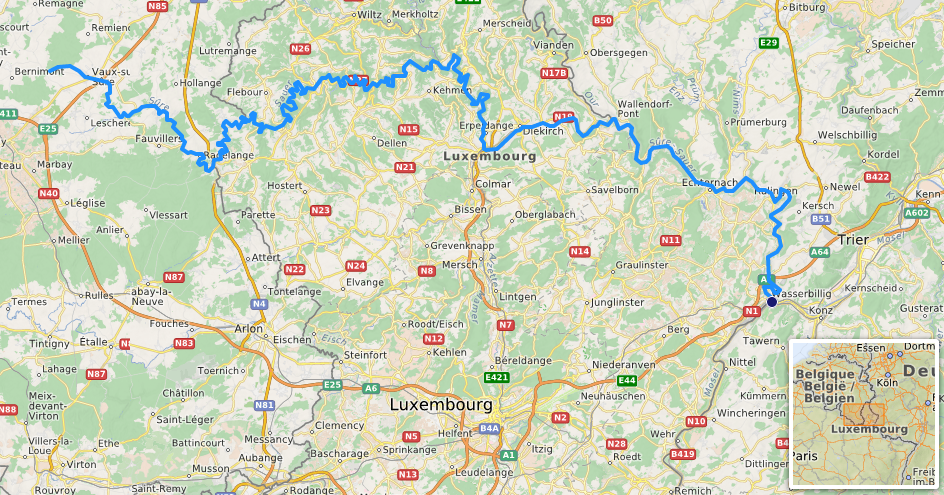
- Path of the Sauer

Location
- Countries: Belgium; Germany; Luxembourg
- Reference no.: DE: 262

Physical characteristics
- Source
  - location: Source region: In the Ardennes on the soil of Libramont-Chevigny near the Planchipont farm (Belgium)
  - elevation: ca. 510 m (1,670 ft)
- Mouth
  - location: Between Wasserbilligerbrück (Germany) and Wasserbillig (Luxembourg) into the Moselle
  - coordinates: 49°42′49″N 6°30′24″E
  - elevation: ca. 133 m above NHN
- Length: 173 km (107 mi)
- Basin size: 4,259 km^{2} (1,644 sq mi)
- Discharge
  - location: at its mouth
  - average: 53.8 m^{3}/s (1,900 cu ft/s)

Basin features
- Progression: Moselle→ Rhine→ North Sea
- River system: Moselle

The Sauer (German and Luxembourgish, German pronunciation: [ˈzaʊɐ], Luxembourgish: [ˈzɑʊ̯ɐ]) or Sûre (French, French pronunciation: [syʁ]) is a river in Belgium, Luxembourg and Germany. A left tributary of the Moselle, its total length is 173 kilometres (107 mi).

Rising near Vaux-sur-Sûre in the Ardennes in southeastern Belgium, the Sauer flows eastwards and becomes the border with Luxembourg near Martelange. It forms the border between Belgium and Luxembourg for 13 kilometres (8 mi) north of Martelange. West of Esch-sur-Sûre it flows into an artificial lake, the Upper Sûre Lake created by the Esch-sur-Sûre Dam, which gives its (French) name to the Luxembourgish commune of Lac de la Haute-Sûre. After flowing through Ettelbruck and Diekirch, the Sauer forms the border between Luxembourg and Germany for the last 50 kilometres (31 mi) of its course, passing Echternach before emptying into the Moselle in Wasserbillig. The rivers Wiltz, Alzette, White Ernz, Black Ernz, Our, and Prüm are tributaries.
