= Senningerberg =

Coordinates: 49.64974°N 6.22726°E

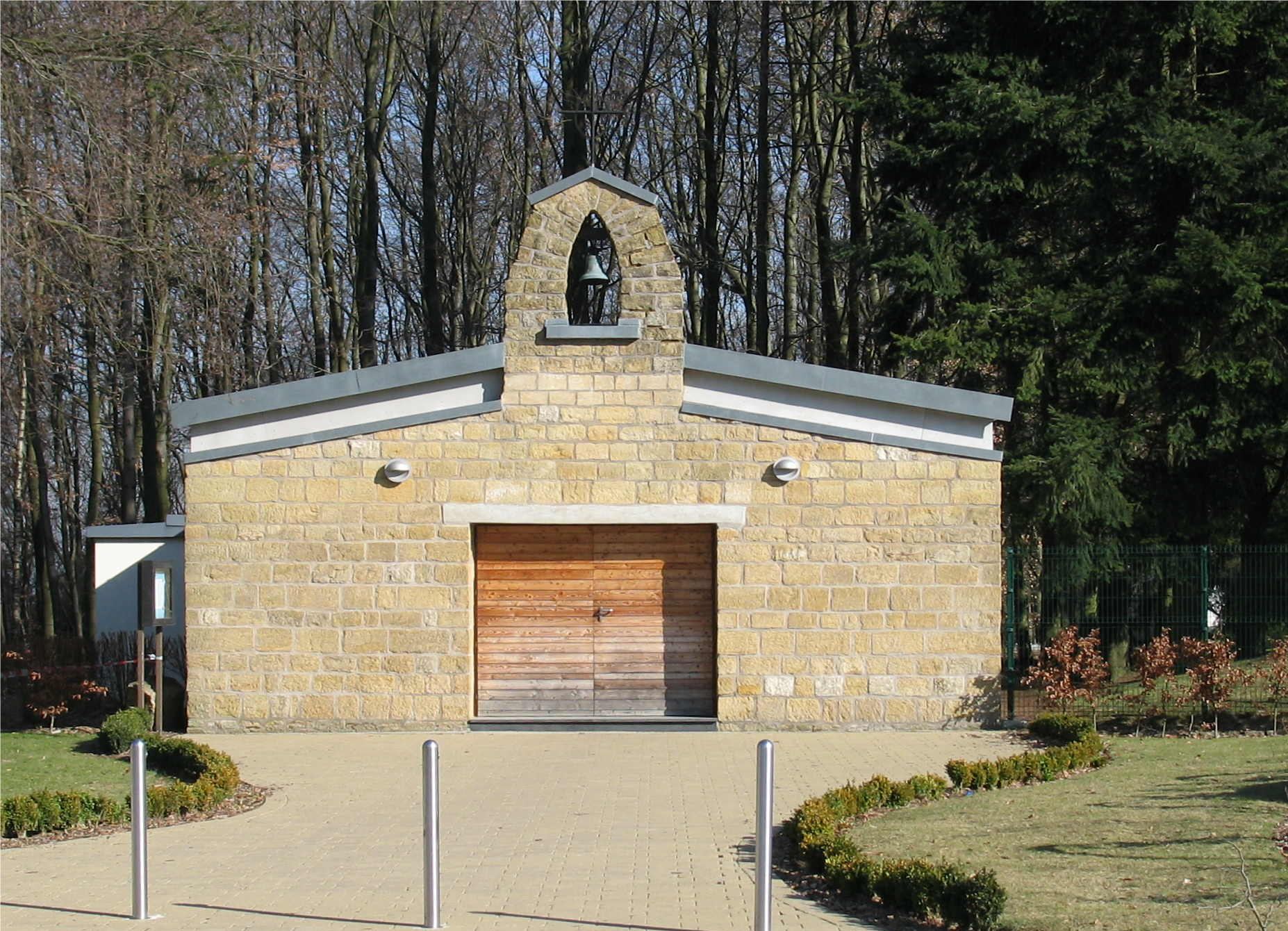
The former chapel in Senningerberg

Senningerberg (German pronunciation: [ˈzɛnɪŋɐbɛʁk]; Luxembourgish: Sennengerbierg) is a town in the commune of Niederanven, in central Luxembourg. It is adjacent to the Grünewald forest and is characterised by an abundance of green natural spaces.

As of September 2026, the town has a population of 2,011.

Senningerberg was served by the Luxembourg City-Echternach narrow-gauge railway line from 1904 until its closure in 1954.
