= Bundesautobahn 64 =

Federal motorway in Germany

A 64
- Bundesautobahn 64

Route information
- Length: 14 km (8.7 mi)

Major junctions
- B 51

Location
- Country: Germany
- States: Rhineland-Palatinate

Highway system
- Roads in Germany; Autobahns; List; Federal; List; State; E-roads

Bundesautobahn 64 (translates from German as Federal Motorway 64, short form Autobahn 64, abbreviated as BAB 64 or A 64) is an autobahn in southwestern Germany. It is the continuation of the Luxembourgish Autoroute 1, connecting the city of Luxembourg to Trier with a total length of only 14 kilometres.

== Exit list ==
	Junction	Destinations / Notes
A 1 E44 — Luxembourg
	Sauertalbrücke 1.200 m	
	(1)	Mesenich — border crossing
		Konz (planned)
	Rest area Markusberg/Sauertal	
	(3)	B 51 Trier
	Biewertalbrücke 600 m	
	Dicke Buche parking area	
	(4)	B 52 E44 Ehrang / Trierer Hafen
	Kylltalbrücke (planned)	
	Quintbachtalbrücke (planned)	
		Schweich-West (planned)
		Schweich-Ost (planned)
Intersection		A 1 3-way interchange Trier (planned)
1.000 mi = 1.609 km; 1.000 km = 0.621 mi: Unopened
