= Mertert =

Mertert Mäertert (Luxembourgish)
- Commune
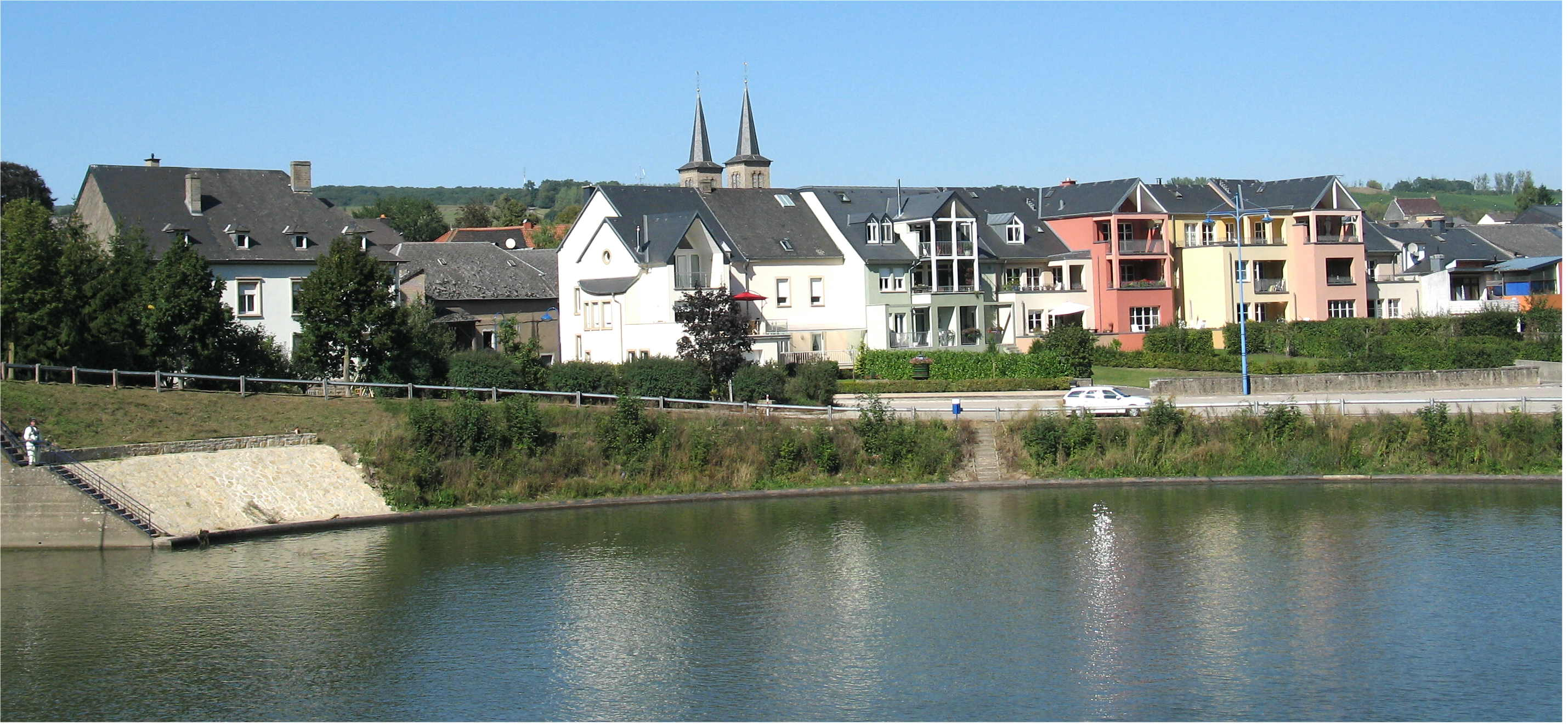

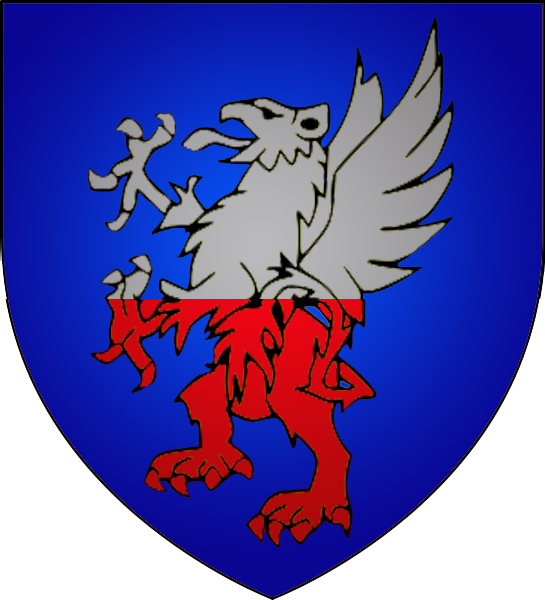
- Coat of arms

- Map of Luxembourg with Mertert highlighted in orange, and the canton in dark red
- Coordinates: 49.7014°N 6.4806°E
- Country: Luxembourg
- Canton: Grevenmacher

Government
  - Mayor: Jérôme Laurent

Area
  - Total: 15.25 km^{2} (5.89 sq mi)
  - Rank: 75th of 100
- Highest elevation: 325 m (1,066 ft)
  - Rank: 93rd of 100
- Lowest elevation: 132 m (433 ft)
  - Rank: 1st of 100

Population (2026)
  - Total: 5,838
  - Rank: 31st of 100
  - Density: 382.8/km^{2} (991.5/sq mi)
  - Rank: 23rd of 100
- Time zone: UTC+1 (CET)
  - Summer (DST): UTC+2 (CEST)
- LAU 2: LU0001107
- Website: www.mertert.lu

Mertert (Luxembourgish: Mäertert) is a commune and town in eastern Luxembourg, on the border with Germany. It is part of the canton of Grevenmacher. The commune consists of the towns of Mertert and Wasserbillig. Mertert has a river port on the Moselle, the largest in Luxembourg. The commune's administrative centre is Wasserbillig.

As of September 2026, the town of Mertert, which lies in the south of the commune, has a population of 2,171.

== Population ==
Historical population

Year	Pop.	±%
1821	802	—
1851	1,088	+35.7%
1900	1,952	+79.4%
1910	2,560	+31.1%
1922	2,191	−14.4%
1935	2,745	+25.3%

Year	Pop.	±%
1947	2,474	−9.9%
1960	2,814	+13.7%
1970	3,011	+7.0%
1981	3,053	+1.4%
1990	3,042	−0.4%
2000	3,328	+9.4%

Year	Pop.	±%
2005	3,367	+1.2%
2010	3,631	+7.8%
2015	4,286	+18.0%
2020	4,635	+8.1%
2021	4,703	+1.5%

Source data

== Notable people ==
- Pierre Frieden (1892–1959), a Luxembourg politician and writer; the 17th Prime Minister of Luxembourg in 1958/1959.
- Jacques Santer (born 1937 in Wasserbillig), a Luxembourgish politician; the 20th Prime Minister of Luxembourg, 1984/1995 and the 9th President of the European Commission, 1995/1999
- General Mario Daubenfeld (born 1958 in Wasserbillig), a Luxembourgish soldier and a former Chief of Defence
