= Wasserbillig =

Town in Mertert, Luxembourg

Wasserbillig Waasserbëlleg
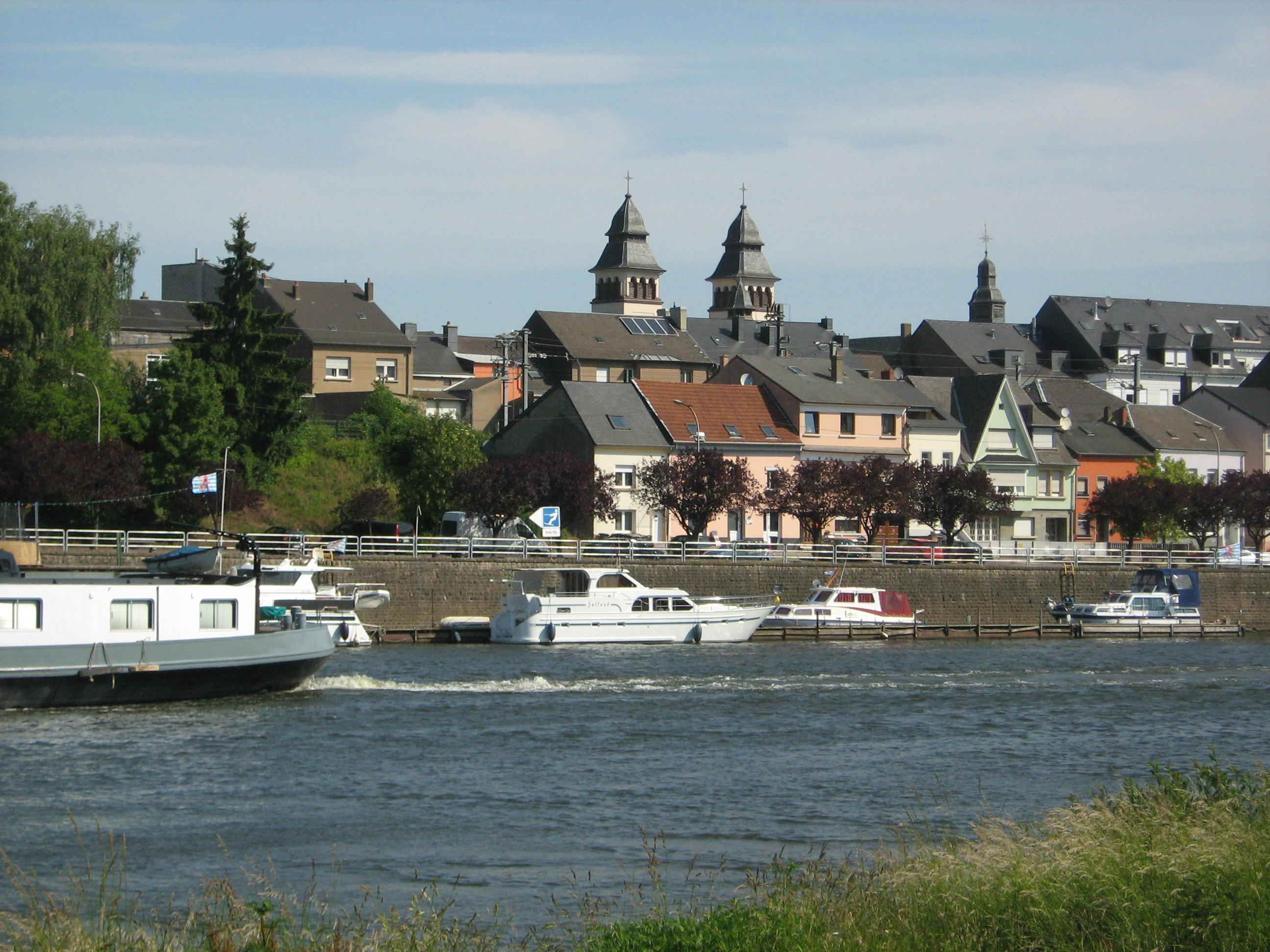
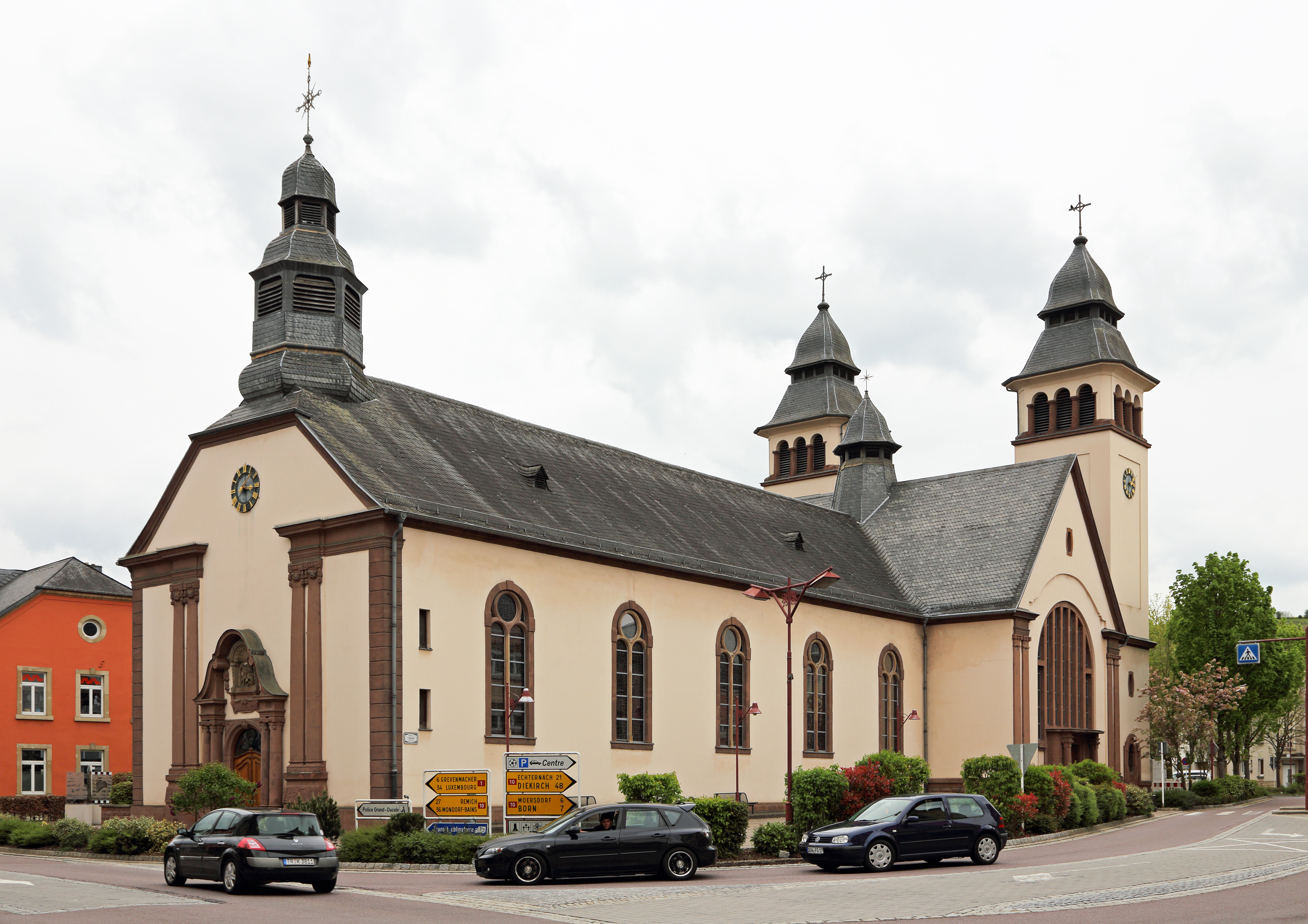
- Wasserbillig, Luxembourg St Martin's church
- Interactive map of Wasserbillig
- Coordinates: 49°42′55″N 6°29′55″E
- Country: Luxembourg
- Canton: Grevenmacher
- Commune: Mertert
- Elevation: 132 m (433 ft)

Population (2025)
  - Total: 3,594
- Website: mertert.lu

Wasserbillig (German pronunciation: [ˈvasɐˌbɪlɪç]; Luxembourgish: Waasserbëlleg [vaːsɐˈbələɕ]) is a town in the commune of Mertert, in eastern Luxembourg. As of September 2026, Wasserbillig has 3,667 inhabitants, which makes it the largest town in Mertert. Wasserbillig is the administrative seat of the commune of Mertert.

== Geography ==
Wasserbillig lies at the confluence of the rivers Moselle and Sauer, which form the border with Germany at the town. On the opposite side of the Moselle and linked by a car ferry lies Oberbillig, Germany; on the opposite side of the Sauer and linked by vehicle and rail bridges lies Wasserbilligerbrück, Germany.

Wasserbillig is the lowest settlement in Luxembourg, at 132 m (433 ft) above sea level.

== History ==
Around 100 AD, there was already a town where Wasserbillig is situated which the Romans named Biliacum. This is also where the second part of Wasserbillig's name comes from (-billig from Biliacum). It was mainly a transloading harbour for goods coming down the Sauer or by cart. During the construction of the bridge over the Sauer in 1952, remnants of an old Roman bridge were found.

In 2000, the town became the centre of international media attention when on 31 May, an armed man entered the Spatzennascht crèche and took 43 children aged one to ten and 5 workers hostage. A large police operation was deployed and the situation ended after 28 hours when two policemen, disguised as journalists, entered the building and neutralised the perpetrator with firearms.

== Notable people ==
- Jacques Santer (born 1937), Luxembourgish politician, Prime Minister of Luxembourg (1984-1995), President of the European Commission (1995-1999).

== Transport ==
The town's railway station is on the line between Luxembourg City and the German border, connecting eastern Luxembourg to Trier.
