= Bourne (surname) =

Bourne is an English surname. Notable people with the surname include:

- Adeline Bourne (1873–1965), Anglo-Indian actress, suffragette, and charity worker
- Alan Bourne (1882–1967), senior officer in the Royal Marines
- Albert Bourne (1863–1930), English footballer
- Aleck Bourne (1886–1974), British gynaecologist and writer tried in a landmark 1938 case for an illegal abortion
- Alfred Bourne (disambiguation)
- Alfred Gibbs Bourne (1859–1940), English zoologist, botanist, and educator
- Ansel Bourne (1826–1910), American evangelical preacher, among the first documented cases of multiple personality and amnesia
- Arthur Bourne (1880–?), English footballer
- Avery Bourne (born 1992), American politician
- Benjamin Bourne (1755–1808), American jurist and politician from Rhode Island
- Bette Bourne (1939–2024), British actor and gay activist
- Bill Bourne (1954–2022), Canadian musician and songwriter
- Bob Bourne (born 1954), Canadian ice hockey player
- Charles Bourne (disambiguation)
- Chester Bourne (1889–?), Guyanese cricketer
- Chris Bourne (born 1985), English footballer
- Clayton Bourne (1904–1986), Canadian swimmer
- Clive Bourne (1942–2007), British businessman and philanthropist
- Daniel Bourne (born 1955), American poet and translator
- Debra Bourne (born 1960), communications expert, brand consultant and advocate
- Dickie Bourne (1879–1954), English footballer
- Doug Bourne (1908–1980), Australian rules footballer
- Edmund Bourne, American self-help author, psychologist, and researcher
- Edward Gaylord Bourne (1860–1908), American historian
- Eleanor Elizabeth Bourne (1878–1957), first Queensland woman to study medicine
- Emma Bourne (1846–1924), American temperance activist and social reformer
- Ernie Bourne (1926–2009), English Australian actor, entertainer, comedian, and puppeteer
- Eulalia Bourne (1892–1984), pioneer Arizona schoolteacher, rancher and author
- Evan Bourne (born 1983), ring name of American professional wrestler Matt Sydal
- Francis Bourne (1861–1935), English prelate of the Catholic Church
- Frank Bourne (1854–1945), British soldier and last known survivor of the Battle of Rorke's Drift
- Frank Card Bourne (1914–1983), American classicist
- Frederick Bourne (disambiguation)
- Frederick Gilbert Bourne (1859–1919), founder of the Singer Manufacturing Company
- George Bourne (1780–1845), American abolitionist and editor
- Holly Bourne, British author
- Hugh Bourne (1772–1852), joint founder of Primitive Methodism, the largest offshoot of Wesleyan Methodism
- Isabelle Bourne (born 2000), Australian basketball player
- James Bourne (born 1983), British singer-songwriter
- John Bourne (artist) (born 1943), British artist and painter
- John Cooke Bourne (1814–1896), artist and engraver
- Jonathan Bourne Jr. (1855–1940), U.S. Senator from Oregon
- JR Bourne (born 1970), Canadian actor
- Kendrick Bourne (born 1995), American football player
- London Bourne (1793–1869), former Barbadian slave who became a wealthy merchant and abolitionist
- Matthew Bourne (born 1960), British choreographer
- Munroe Bourne (1910–1992), Canadian swimmer
- Nick Bourne (born 1952), British politician
- Peter Bourne (born 1939), anthropologist, writer, and civil servant
- Philip Bourne (1953–2026), scientist
- Possum Bourne (1956–2003), New Zealand rally car driver
- Randolph Bourne (1886–1918), American Progressivist writer and essayist
- Ruth Bourne (1926–2025), British codebreaker and World War II veteran
- Samuel Bourne (1834–1912), British photographer of India
- Shae-Lynn Bourne (born 1976), Canadian ice dancer
- Stephen R. Bourne (born 1944), British-born computer scientist
- Teddy Bourne (born 1948), British Olympic épée fencer
- Una Mabel Bourne (1882–1974), Australian pianist and composer
- Wendy Bourne, Australian politician
- William Bourne (disambiguation)

== Characters ==
- Jason Bourne (first appeared 1980), created by Robert Ludlum

== See also ==
- Borne (disambiguation)
- Bourne (disambiguation)
- Burne, a surname
