= Borne =

Borne may refer to:

== Places ==
- Borne, Ardèche, a commune in the Ardèche department, France
- Borne, Haute-Loire, a commune in the Haute-Loire department, France
- Borne, Saxony-Anhalt, a municipality in Saxony-Anhalt, Germany
- Borne, Bihar, a village in Bihar, India
- Borne, North Brabant, a hamlet turned neighborhood in North Brabant, Netherlands
- Borne, Overijssel, a town in Overijssel, Netherlands
- Borne, Drawsko County in West Pomeranian Voivodeship, Poland
- Borne, Gmina Chojnice in Pomeranian Voivodeship, Poland
- Borne, Gmina Konarzyny in Pomeranian Voivodeship, Poland
- Borne, Myślibórz County in West Pomeranian Voivodeship, Poland

== People ==
- Borne (surname)

== Other uses ==
- Borne (band), an Australian alt-rock band
- Borne (novel), by Jeff VanderMeer
- -borne, a UK place name suffix, using a form of Bourne
- A "borne", a waymarker on Liberty Road (La Voie de la Liberté) in northern France

== See also ==
- Born (disambiguation)
  - Born (surname)
- Bourne (disambiguation)
  - Bourne (surname)
