= Bourne =

Bourne may refer to:

== Places ==
=== UK ===
- Bourne, Lincolnshire, a town
  - Bourne Abbey
  - Bourne Academy
  - Bourne Eau
  - Bourne Grammar School
  - Bourne railway station
- Bourne (electoral division), West Sussex
- Bourne SSSI, Avon, a Site of Special Scientific Interest near Burrington, North Somerset
- Bourne, a hundred in Farnham, Surrey
- Bournes Green, a hamlet in Gloucestershire; also (separately) a suburb of Southend-on-Sea, Essex
- Bourne Mill, Colchester, a National Trust property in Essex

=== US ===
- Bourne, Massachusetts, a town
  - Bourne (CDP), Massachusetts, a census-designated place in the town
  - Bourne High School
  - Bourne station
- Bourne, Oregon, a ghost town
- Bourne Field, an ex-military airstrip on St. Thomas, US Virgin Islands

== People ==
- Bourne (surname)
- John Cooke Bourne, British artist, engraver and photographer
- William Bourne (disambiguation)

== Fiction ==
- Jason Bourne, a fictional character in novels by Robert Ludlum and the film adaptations
- Bourne (novel series), a series of novels originally by Robert Ludlum
  - Bourne (franchise), a film series based on the novels

== Other uses ==
- Bourne (stream), an intermittent stream, flowing from a spring
- Bourne baronets
- Bourne Co. Music Publishers, an American music publisher
- Bourne shell, in Unix
- Bourne Stone, in Bourne, Massachusetts
- Bourne United Charities, a charitable body in Bourne, Lincolnshire

== See also ==
- Bourne Brook (disambiguation)
- Bourne End (disambiguation)
- Bourne Park (disambiguation)
- Bourne Town Hall (disambiguation)
- River Bourne (disambiguation)
- Borne (disambiguation)
- Bourn, Cambridgeshire, a village in England
