= Born (surname) =

Born is a German surname. Notable people with the surname include:

- Adolf Born (1930–2016), Czech painter and illustrator
- B. H. Born (1932–2013), American basketball player
- Bob Born (1924–2023), American businessman, candy maker and inventor
- Brooksley Born (born 1940), American lawyer and public official
- Claire Born (1898–1965), German operatic soprano
- Daniel Born (born 1975), German politician (SPD)
- Elina Born (born 1994), Estonian singer
- Georgina Born (born 1955), British anthropologist and musician
- Heidi von Born (1936–2018), Swedish writer and translator
- Ignaz von Born (1742–1791), Austrian mineralogist and metallurgist
- Max Born (1882–1970), German mathematician and physicist
- Maurice Born (1943–2020), Swiss architect and ethnographer
- Sam Born (1891–1959), American businessman, candy maker and inventor

== See also ==
- Borne (disambiguation)
