= Northbourne =

Northbourne may refer to:

- Northbourne, Bournemouth, Dorset, England
- Northbourne, Kent, England
- Northbourne, a village formerly part of East Hagbourne, now Didcot, England
- Northbourne Avenue, a road in Canberra, Australia
- Baron Northbourne, a title in the Peerage of the United Kingdom

== See also ==
- Bourne (disambiguation)
