= Borne (surname) =

Borne is a surname. Notable people with the surname include:

- Alain Borne (1915–1962), 20th-century French poet and lawyer
- Daisy Theresa Borne (1906–1998), British sculptor
- Élisabeth Borne (born 1961), French politician
- Étienne Borne (1907–1993), professor
- François Borne (1840–1920), French flautist and composer
- Guillaume Borne (born 1988), French footballer
- Hal Borne (1911–2000), American song composer, orchestra leader, music arranger, and musical director
- Lucien-Hubert Borne (1884–1954), Canadian politician
- Matt Borne (1957–2013), American wrestler
- Michel Borne (1784–1???), merchant and political figure
- Myles Borne (born 1999), American wrestler
- Tony Borne (1926–2010), American professional wrestler
- Vanessa Borne (born 1988), American professional wrestler and actress

== See also ==
- Borne (disambiguation)
- Ludwig Börne (1786–1837), German political writer and satirist
  - Ludwig Börne Prize, a German annual literary award
