= Bourn Brook =

Bourn Brook is a common name for small rivers, reflected in a number of place names. See:

- Bourn Brook, Cambridgeshire
- Bournbrook, Birmingham named after the Bourn Brook, a tributary of the River Rea, which it joins at Cannon Hill Park in Birmingham.
- Bournville, Birmingham

== See also ==
- Bourne (disambiguation)
- Bourne Brook (disambiguation)
