= Charles Bourne =

Charles Bourne may refer to:

- Charles Bourne (footballer) (1882–1930), Australian rules footballer
- Charlie Bourne (1906–1958), Australian rules footballer
- Charles Bourne (cricketer) (1910–1975), Barbadian cricketer
- Sir Charles Bourne (judge) (born 1964), British High Court judge
