= Liberty Road =

Liberty Road may refer to:

- Liberty Road (France), a historical commemorative road in northern France marking the path taken by the allies in ww2.
- Liberty Road (Maryland), a state highway in the U.S. state of Maryland
- Liberty Road (Rio Grande National Forest), a road in Rio Grande National Forest
