= Burne =

Burne (variations: Byrnes, Byrne, O'Byrne, O'Byrnes, Burns, Beirne, Bourne) is a surname. Notable people with the surname include:

- Alfred Burne (1886–1959), soldier and military historian
- Charlotte Sophia Burne (1850–1923), author and editor, president of the Folklore Society
- Christopher F. Burne, brigadier general in the United States Air Force
- Edward Burne-Jones (1833–1898), British artist and designer who worked closely with William Morris
- Gary Burne (1943–1976), Rhodesian dancer, ballet master, and choreographer
- Grayson Burne, British sprint canoeist who competed from the early 1980s to the mid-1990s
- Henry de Burne
- James Burne Ferguson, 19th century Member of Parliament in New Zealand
- Judith Burne (born 1962), rower
- Loh Gwo Burne (born 1974), Malaysian politician
- Nancy Burne (1907–1954), British film actress
- Nicol Burne (1574–1598), Scottish Roman Catholic controversialist
- Owen Tudor Burne (1837–1909), British major-general
- Philip Burne-Jones (1861–1926), first child of the British Pre-Raphaelite artist Sir Edward Burne-Jones
- Richard Burne (1882–1970)
- Robert Burne, American microbiologist
- Wilfred Burne (1903–1989), British diver

== See also ==
- Burne Hogarth (1911–1996), American cartoonist, illustrator, educator, author and theoretician
- Burne-Jones baronets, title in the Baronetage of the United Kingdom
- BURN-E, a 2008 Pixar animated short film
