= Born =

Born may refer to:

- Birth
  - Childbirth, birth of a human
- Born (surname), a surname (see also for a list of people with the name)
- Born (comics), a comic book limited series

== Places ==
- Born, Belgium, a village in the German-speaking Community of Belgium
- Born, Luxembourg, a village in Luxembourg
- Born auf dem Darß, a municipality in Mecklenburg-Vorpommern, Germany
- Born, Netherlands, a town in the Netherlands
- Born, Saxony-Anhalt, a municipality in Saxony-Anhalt, Germany
- Born (crater), a small lunar impact crater located near the eastern edge of the Moon, to the northeast of the prominent crater Langrenus
- El Born, neighbourhood of the district of La Ribera, Barcelona

== Music ==
- Born (Bond album), 2001
- Born (Boom Crash Opera album), 1995
- Born (China Black album), 1995
- Born (EP), a 2004 EP by D'espairsRay
- "Born" (song), a 1970 song by Barry Gibb
- "Born", a song by the metal band Nevermore from This Godless Endeavor
- "Born", a song by the pop-rock band OneRepublic from Oh My My
- "Born", a song by the Ohio-based band Over the Rhine from Drunkard's Prayer

== Other uses ==
- Born rule probability density function by Max Born
- Battle Organization of Russian Nationalists, a Russian neo-Nazi group
- Cupra Born, a hatchback
- Born Electric, an electric SUV sub brand of Mahindra

== See also ==
- Børns, American singer
