= Bourne Brook (disambiguation) =

Bourne Brook is a common name for a small river, reflected in a number of locations. See:

- Bourne Brook a tributary of the River Tame, West Midlands. It joins the Tame near Fazeley in Staffordshire.
- There is another Bourne Brook in Staffordshire, a stream that flows into the River Trent near Kings Bromley.
- A third Bourne Brook feeds into the River Rom at Bournebridge in Essex.

== See also ==
- Bourn Brook (disambiguation)
- Bourne (disambiguation)
