= Auneau =

Commune in Eure-et-Loir, France

- Part of Auneau-Bleury-Saint-Symphorien
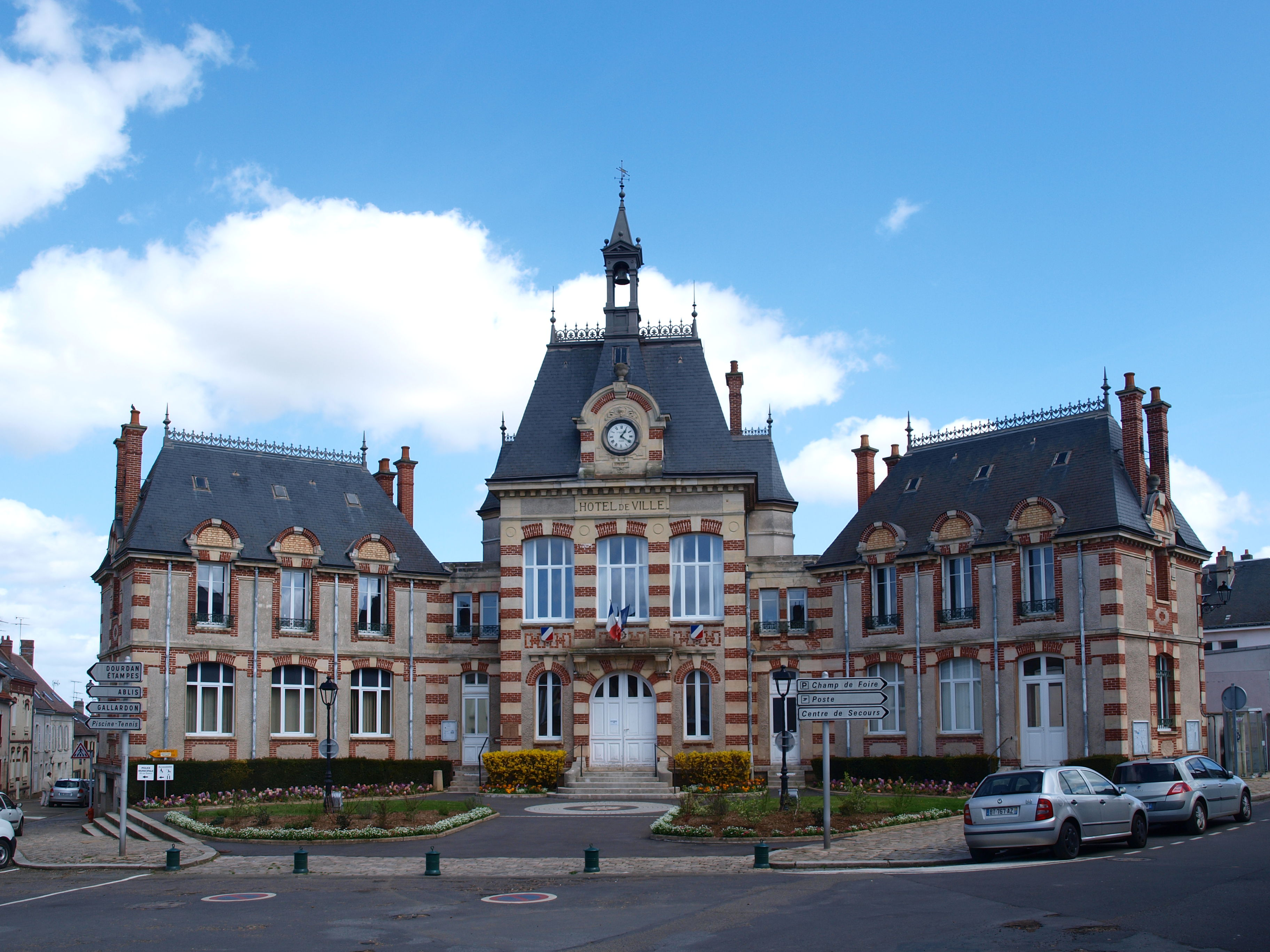
- Town hall

- Coat of arms
- Location of Auneau
- Location within France Location within Centre-Val de Loire
- Coordinates: 48°27′43″N 1°46′23″E
- Country: France
- Region: Centre-Val de Loire
- Department: Eure-et-Loir
- Arrondissement: Chartres
- Canton: Auneau
- Commune: Auneau-Bleury-Saint-Symphorien
- Area^{1}: 17.05 km^{2} (6.58 sq mi)
- Elevation: 150 m (490 ft)
- Highest elevation: 157 m (515 ft)
- Lowest elevation: 120 m (390 ft)
- Population (2022): 5,100
  - Density: 300/km^{2} (770/sq mi)
- Time zone: UTC+01:00 (CET)
  - Summer (DST): UTC+02:00 (CEST)
- Postal code: 28700
- ^{1} French Land Register data, which excludes lakes, ponds, glaciers > 1 km^{2} (0.386 sq mi or 247 acres) and river estuaries.

Auneau (French pronunciation: [ono]) is a former commune in the Eure-et-Loir department in northern France. On 1 January 2016, it was merged into the new commune of Auneau-Bleury-Saint-Symphorien.

== Population ==
Historical population

Year	Pop.	±% p.a.
1793	1,350	—
1800	1,431	+0.84%
1806	1,541	+1.24%
1821	1,585	+0.19%
1831	1,616	+0.19%
1836	1,616	+0.00%
1841	1,652	+0.44%
1846	1,672	+0.24%
1851	1,699	+0.32%
1856	1,741	+0.49%
1861	1,687	−0.63%
1866	1,705	+0.21%
1872	1,736	+0.30%
1876	1,806	+0.99%
1881	1,825	+0.21%
1886	1,838	+0.14%
1891	1,850	+0.13%

Year	Pop.	±% p.a.
1896	1,853	+0.03%
1901	1,946	+0.98%
1906	1,954	+0.08%
1911	2,050	+0.96%
1921	1,920	−0.65%
1926	1,919	−0.01%
1931	1,962	+0.44%
1936	1,867	−0.99%
1946	1,937	+0.37%
1954	1,868	−0.45%
1962	2,014	+0.95%
1968	2,358	+2.66%
1975	2,791	+2.44%
1982	3,183	+1.90%
1990	3,098	−0.34%
1999	3,880	+2.53%
2022	5,100	+1.20%

Source: EHESS and INSEE

== See also ==
- Communes of the Eure-et-Loir department
