= Auneau-Bleury-Saint-Symphorien =

- Commune
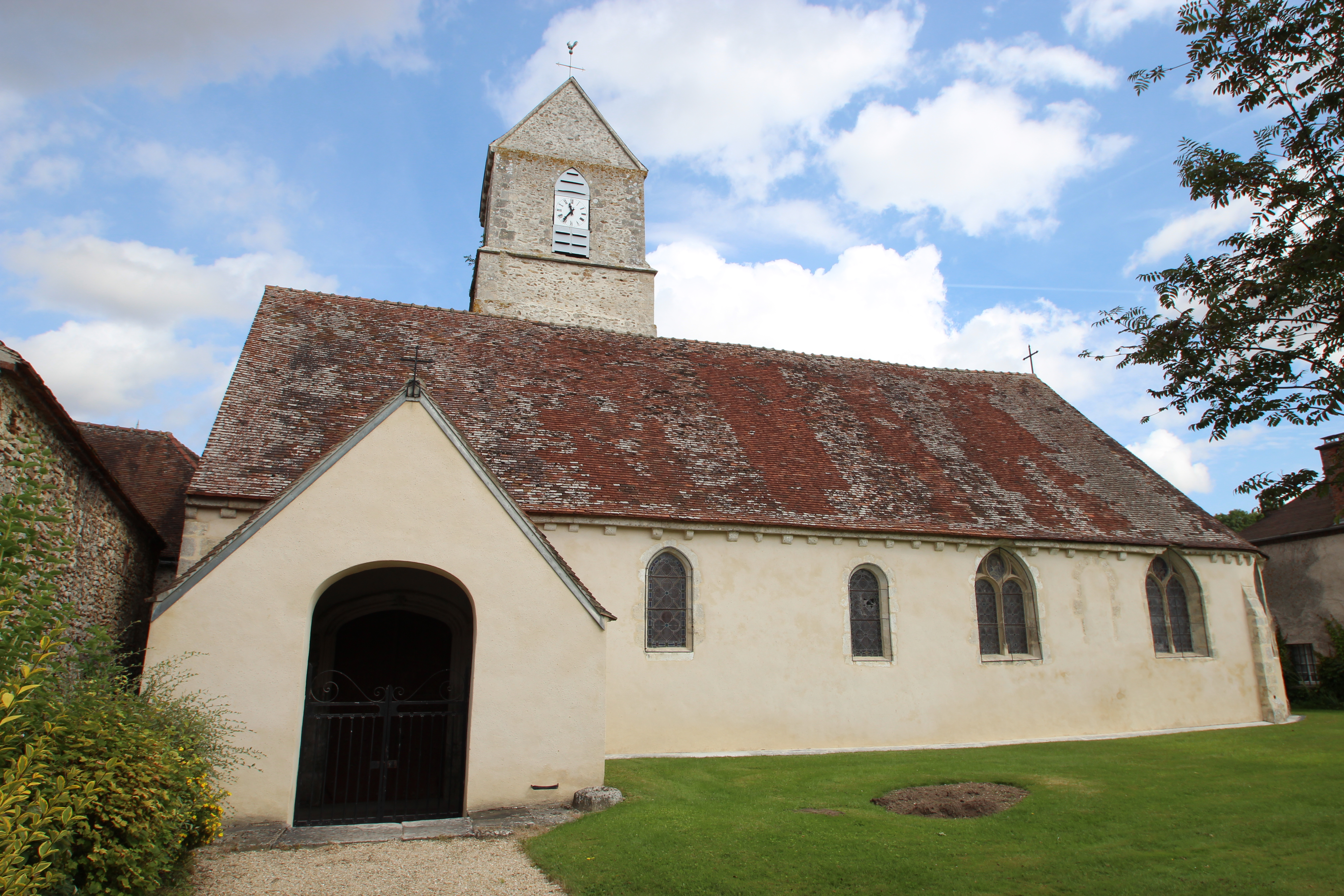
- The church in Bleury

- Coat of arms
- Location of Auneau-Bleury-Saint-Symphorien
- Location within France Location within Centre-Val de Loire
- Coordinates: 48°27′47″N 1°46′30″E
- Country: France
- Region: Centre-Val de Loire
- Department: Eure-et-Loir
- Arrondissement: Chartres
- Canton: Auneau
- Intercommunality: CC Portes Euréliennes Île-de-France

Government
  - Mayor (2020–2026): Jean-Luc Ducerf
- Area^{1}: 34.29 km^{2} (13.24 sq mi)
- Highest elevation: 162 m (531 ft)
- Lowest elevation: 113 m (371 ft)
- Population (2023): 6,419
  - Density: 187.2/km^{2} (484.8/sq mi)
- Time zone: UTC+01:00 (CET)
  - Summer (DST): UTC+02:00 (CEST)
- INSEE/Postal code: 28015 /28700
- ^{1} French Land Register data, which excludes lakes, ponds, glaciers > 1 km^{2} (0.386 sq mi or 247 acres) and river estuaries.

Auneau-Bleury-Saint-Symphorien (French pronunciation: [ono blœʁi sɛ̃ sɛ̃fɔʁjɛ̃]) is a commune in the Eure-et-Loir department in northern France. The municipality was established on 1 January 2016 by merger of the former communes of Auneau and Bleury-Saint-Symphorien. Bleury-Saint-Symphorien was the result of the merger, on 1 January 2012, of the communes of Bleury and Saint-Symphorien-le-Château.

== Population ==
Population data refer to the commune in its geography as of January 2025.

Historical population
Year	Pop.	±% p.a.
1968	2,819	—
1975	3,217	+1.90%
1982	3,841	+2.56%
1990	4,352	+1.57%
1999	5,136	+1.86%
2007	5,294	+0.38%
2012	5,512	+0.81%
2017	5,916	+1.42%
2023	6,419	+1.37%
Source: INSEE

== See also ==
- Communes of the Eure-et-Loir department
