= Hot Tamales =

Cinnamon-flavored candy

Hot Tamales Small Box

Hot Tamales is an American brand of cinnamon-flavored candies manufactured and marketed by the Just Born company. Introduced in 1950, they were developed by Bob Born, son of Sam Born, the company's founder. The name derives from the sometimes spicy flavor of tamales. It was the top-selling cinnamon candy in 1999.

== Variations ==
In 2011, Just Born released Hot Tamales 3 ALARM containing a mix of three candies: orange (hot), pinkish (hotter) and dark red (hottest). Around this time, Just Born also marketed Hot Tamales Fire (originally Super Hot Hot Tamales) with a hotter flavor and darker color. In 2014, Just Born released Hot Tamales Tropical Heat that contains three candies, combining the original pungent, spicy flavor with lemon, mango and pineapple flavor.

A spearmint version, Hot Tamales Ice, was marketed in the late 2000s, but was subsequently discontinued. It was reintroduced again in 2018 combined with the regular Hot Tamales and marketed as Hot Tamales Fire & Ice.

== Ingredients ==
As listed on the original Hot Tamales and Hot Tamales Fire boxes:

Sugar, corn syrup, modified food starch, contains less than 0.5% of the following ingredients: dextrin, medium chain triglycerides, fruit juice from concentrate (pear, orange, strawberry, cherry, lemon, lime), sodium citrate, pectin, citric acid, malic acid, fumaric acid, confectioners glaze, carnauba wax, white mineral oil, artificial flavors, artificial color, sodium citrate, magnesium hydroxide, red #3, red #40, yellow #5 (tartrazine), yellow #6, blue #1.

== See also ==
- List of confectionery brands
- Mike and Ike – similar Just Born brand
