= Goldenberg's Peanut Chews =

Chocolate and peanut candy bar product

- Product type: Chocolate bar
- Current owner: Just Born
- Produced by: Just Born
- Country: United States
- Introduced: 1917; 109 years ago
- Markets: United States
- Previous owners: Goldenberg Candy Company (1917–2003)
- Tagline: Now that's chewin' it old school
- Website: www.peanutchews.com

Peanut Chews are a family of candy bar products manufactured by American company Just Born. They consist of peanuts and molasses covered in chocolatey coating, and are available in original dark chocolatey flavor and milk chocolatey coatings. The bars are small, similar in size to a "fun size" or Halloween-size bar. They are especially familiar to residents of Philadelphia, the Philadelphia area, and neighboring Mid-Atlantic states.

== Overview ==
Peanut Chews were developed and, during most of their history, manufactured by the Goldenberg Candy Company, which was founded by a Romanian immigrant, David Goldenberg, in 1890. Peanut Chews were first introduced in 1917. The candies were originally developed for use by the U.S. military as a ration bar during World War I. The high-energy, high-protein recipe and unique taste made it popular with the troops. In 1921, Harry Goldenberg introduced the first wrapped Peanut Chews candy for retail sales. In the 1930s, the candy was converted from a full-size bar to small individual pieces. In 1949, Harry and Sylvia Goldenberg (second generation) purchased the Peanut Chews Division of D. Goldenberg, Inc., to focus solely on the production of Peanut Chews candies. In 2003, Just Born, Inc., a Bethlehem, Pennsylvania–based candy company, purchased the Peanut Chews brand and the Northeast Philadelphia manufacturing facility.

Some vegans are fond of the original flavor, which contains no milk or egg products, as would be typical of most dark chocolate and some caramel candies. Just Born made changes in both the formulation and packaging of the candy and attempted to expand its market area beyond the Mid-Atlantic states. After realizing that the product was losing ground in its core market (roughly from Baltimore to New York City), the company decided to re-emphasize its marketing within the home region. The Goldenberg's name was also restored to equal prominence alongside "Peanut Chews" on the redesigned candy wrappers.

== In popular culture ==
On November 16, 2017, two individually wrapped Peanut Chews were awarded to any contestant who could finish an obstacle course during an episode of The Chris Gethard Show. The show's host, Chris Gethard, referred to them several times as an "underrated candy".

On May 7, 2023, Goldenberg's Peanut Chews were featured prominently in an episode of The Blacklist (Season 10, Episode 11) where the main character, Raymond Reddington, went into the store and asked for them by name stating, "Excuse me. Do you sell Goldenberg's Peanut Chews? I can never resist the temptation when in Philadelphia."

== See also ==
- List of confectionery brands
- List of chocolate bar brands
