= Saint-Symphorien-le-Château =

- Part of Auneau-Bleury-Saint-Symphorien
- Location of Saint-Symphorien-le-Château
- Location within France Location within Centre-Val de Loire
- Coordinates: 48°31′04″N 1°45′42″E
- Country: France
- Region: Centre-Val de Loire
- Department: Eure-et-Loir
- Arrondissement: Chartres
- Canton: Auneau
- Commune: Auneau-Bleury-Saint-Symphorien
- Area^{1}: 9.39 km^{2} (3.63 sq mi)
- Elevation: 153 m (502 ft)
- Highest elevation: 162 m (531 ft)
- Lowest elevation: 122 m (400 ft)
- Population (2016): 820
  - Density: 87/km^{2} (230/sq mi)
- Time zone: UTC+01:00 (CET)
  - Summer (DST): UTC+02:00 (CEST)
- Postal code: 28700
- ^{1} French Land Register data, which excludes lakes, ponds, glaciers > 1 km^{2} (0.386 sq mi or 247 acres) and river estuaries.

Saint-Symphorien-le-Château (French pronunciation: [sɛ̃ sɛ̃fɔʁjɛ̃ lə ʃɑto]) is a former commune in the Eure-et-Loir department in northern France. In January 2012 it merged with Bleury into the new commune Bleury-Saint-Symphorien, which was merged into Auneau-Bleury-Saint-Symphorien on 1 January 2016.

== Population ==
Historical population
Year	Pop.	±% p.a.
1962	276	—
1968	297	+1.23%
1975	250	−2.43%
1982	388	+6.48%
1990	859	+10.44%
1999	834	−0.33%
2016	820	−0.10%
Source: EHESS and INSEE

== See also ==
- Communes of the Eure-et-Loir department
