= Daniel Bourne =

American poet

Daniel Bourne (born March 2, 1955) is a poet, translator of poetry from Polish, editor, and professor of English at The College of Wooster in Wooster, Ohio, where he has taught since 1988. He teaches Creative Writing and poetry. He attended Indiana University Bloomington, where he received his Bachelor of Arts in Comparative Literature and History in 1979, and a Master of Fine Arts in Creative writing in 1987. Bourne is the editor and founder of the Artful Dodge literary magazine which focuses on fiction of place as well as translations, and has been praised for its publication of Polish poets in translation. He lives outside Wooster with his wife Margret and his son Carter.

== Poetry ==
Bourne's poetry has been published in American Poetry Review, Ploughshares, Indiana Review, Salmagundi, Shenandoah, The Journal, and North American Review. His poetry has also been widely anthologized.

In the award citation for the 2003 Edges Prize, won by Bourne for Where No One Spoke the Language, poet Carolyne Wright praises Bourne for his ability to "make the strange familiar," writing that "Bourne speaks, across borders of linguistic and national difference, a profoundly human language for us all." This collection "is worldly in the best sense: drawing on the author's extensive time in Poland, the poems meditate on history and cross-cultural perspectives. With intellectual depth and range, Bourne's poems bring the reader into a larger consciousness about our place on the earth."

The poet, William Heyen, writes, "What Daniel Bourne has done here is something I haven't heard done yet--Charles Simic's surreal mode grounded, but with Simic's knowledge of Eastern Europe. Remarkable and relentless, Where No One Spoke the Language achieves a voice of exile deeper than any I've heard from an American poet since The Waste Land." Indeed, before its publication, Where No One Spoke the Language was a finalist for the T. S. Eliot Prize (Truman State University) in 2003.

Bourne's poetry has been translated into Polish and Hungarian. In Hungary, it appeared in Magyar Napló, the official literary magazine of the Hungarian Writers' Union. In Poland, it appeared in Odra and Topos. His poem "Vigilia" and the title poem of his book, "Where No One Spoke the Language," were published under the pseudonym Jerzy Sarna in the illegal underground literary journal, Obecnosc, during martial law.

== Translations ==
Bourne is well regarded for his translations of contemporary Polish poetry, notably his translations of Bronislaw Maj, and of On the Crossroads of Asia and Europe and other works by Polish poet Tomasz Jastrun. This collection is praised by the Sarmatian Review which states, "Bourne strikes a careful middle ground between the rewrite and negative capability. And I think that is because he is no armchair translator, but a poet himself, who lived through the world described in Jastrun's poems. He was living in Warsaw during martial law, sneaking about to meet with various poets and writers and visual artists." Indeed, Bourne was in Poland during the Summer of 1980 and the rise of Solidarity—the shipyard strikes that soon took over the entire country and resulted in the Workers Accord being signed between Solidarity and the Polish government creating the first independent trade unions in the Eastern Bloc. He later returned to Poland for a year during the period of martial law, and then for two more years in 1985–87 on a Fulbright fellowship for the translation of younger Polish poets. In The Polish Review, of On the Crossroads of Asia and Europe, it is commented that "Many of the poems read as English originals and have little of the awkwardness seen in some translated verse."

Bourne is considered an important translator of Polish poetry during the last decade of Communism and into the post-communist era, having also translated the poetry of Jan Polkowski and Krystyna Lars as well as being the editor of the section on Polish writing for Shifting Borders, an anthology of Eastern European poetry published in 1993.

== Books ==
- Where No One Spoke The Language, Custom Words Press, 2006
- The Household Gods, Cleveland State University Press, 1995
- Boys Who Go Aloft, a poetry chapbook published by Sparrow Press in 1987

=== Notable translations ===
- Here At The End of My Hands, by Bronislaw Maj
- On the Crossroads of Asia and Europe, a collection of translations of Polish poetry and essayist Tomasz Jastrun, Salmon Run.
