= Bob Born =

American businessman (1924–2023)

- Born: September 29, 1924; Brooklyn, New York, U.S.
- Died: January 29, 2023 (aged 98); Conshohocken, Pennsylvania, U.S.
- Occupations: Businessman, investor
- Known for: Peeps
- Spouse(s): Maxine Appell; Elaine Selwyn; Patricia Guggenheim
- Relatives: Sam Born (father)

Ira Brahm "Bob" Born (September 29, 1924 – January 29, 2023) was an American businessperson and inventor in the confectionery industry. For more than thirty years, he was president of Just Born, a family-owned candy manufacturer founded by his father Sam Born. Bob became known as the "Father of Peeps" for automating the production of an Easter marshmallow treat, and also developed the candy Hot Tamales.

== Early life and education ==
Born was born on September 29, 1924, to Sam Born and Ann Shaffer, a Jewish family living in Brooklyn. His father was from Ukraine, then part of the Russian Empire. In 1932, the family moved to Bethlehem, Pennsylvania, where their candy factory was located. He graduated from Lehigh University in 1944 with a degree in Engineering Physics. During World War II, he served on a destroyer in the United States Navy. After the war, Born studied graduate-level math and physics at the University of Arizona and the Massachusetts Institute of Technology. He was accepted into medical school but did not start classes, instead started work in his father's company.

== Career ==
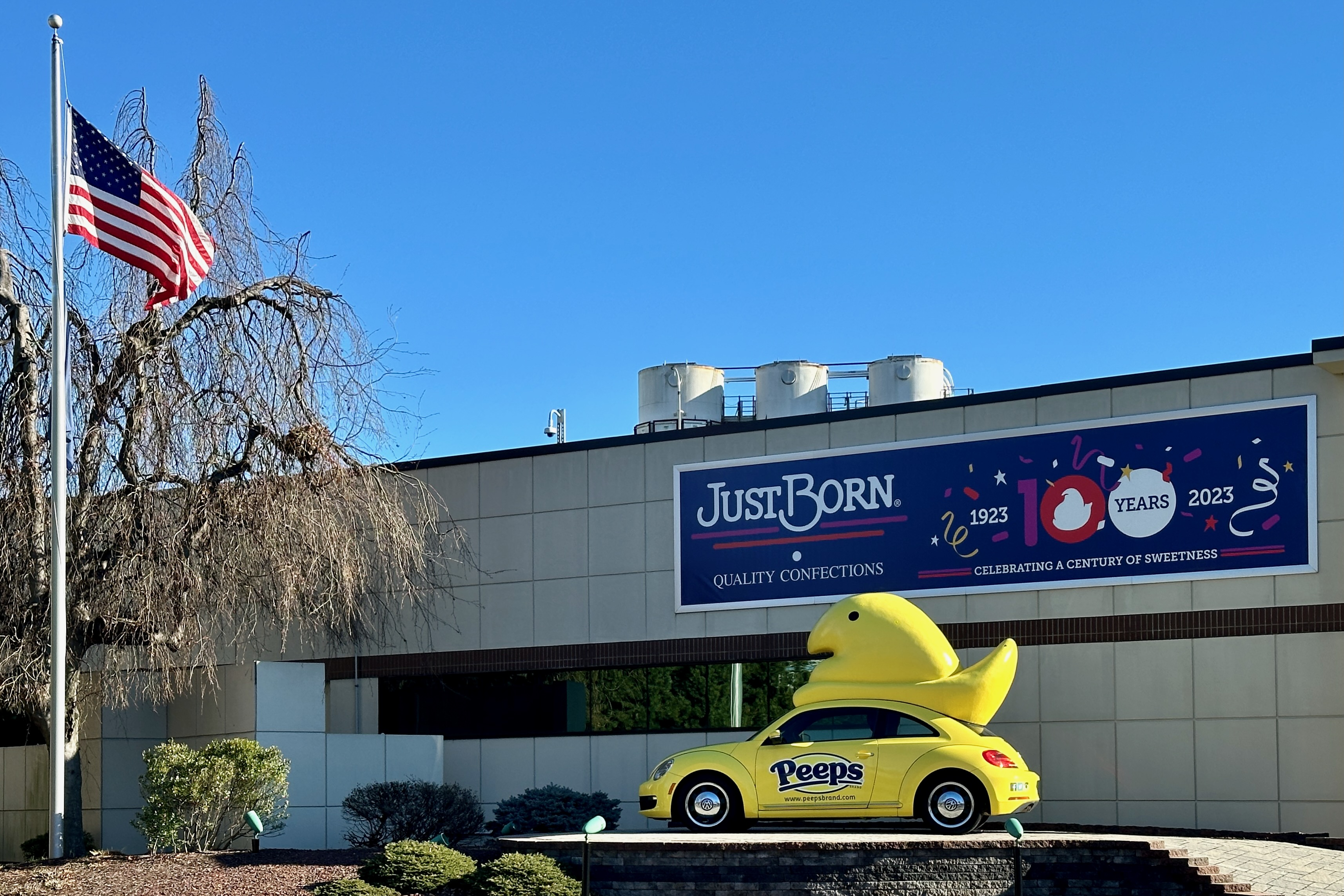
Just Born building where Peeps are made

In 1945, Born joined his father's company, Just Born. In 1950, he developed a process to turn unused Mike and Ike candies into a new product, Hot Tamales, by remelting them and adding hot cinnamon flavor. In 1953, the company acquired the Rodda Candy Company, known for its jelly beans. Rodda also made novelty marshmallow chicks, Peeps, as early as 1925. The manual process took 27 hours to produce one. By studying the process and designing a simpler Peep, Born, along with another engineer, created an automated system that took only 6 minutes to produce one. The company now makes over five million a day, with most of the sales occurring during the Easter season.

Born became president of the company in 1959. He was succeeded by his son Ross Born and his cousin David Shaffer as co-presidents in 1992. Bob Born Day was celebrated in Bethlehem on February 15, 2019, led by its mayor Robert Donchez.

== Personal life ==
Born was married three times. He was first married to Maxine Appell, a healthcare professional. They had a son, born in 1953, and a daughter. He next married Elaine Selwyn; they were together until her death in 2008. At the time of his death, he was married to Patricia Guggenheim. He retired to West Palm Beach, Florida. He died at his home in Conshohocken, Pennsylvania, on January 29, 2023.
