= Peeps =

Marshmallow candies shaped into animals or festive images

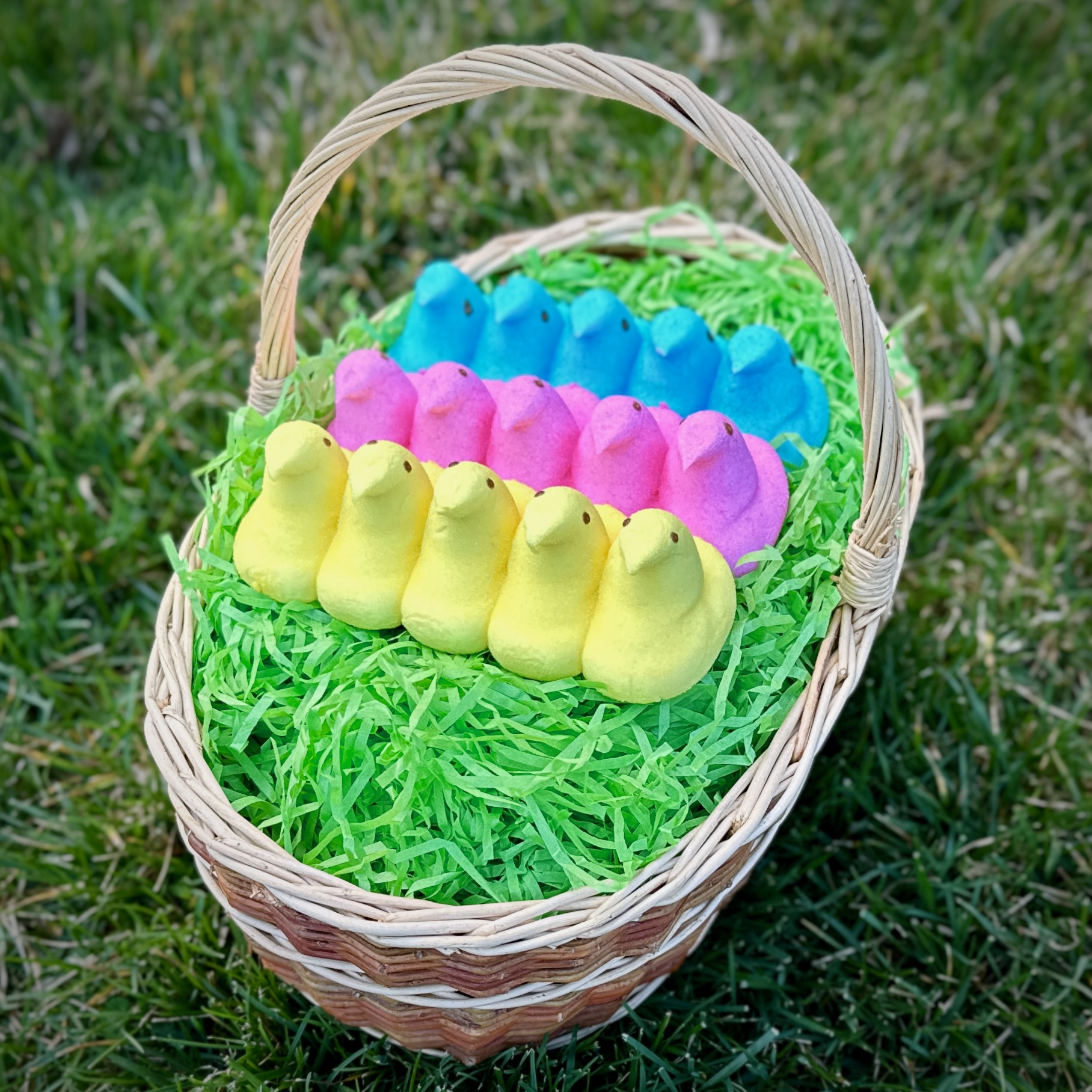
- Just Born Peeps in an Easter basket
- Product type: Confectionery
- Current owner: Just Born
- Country: United States
- Introduced: 1953; 73 years ago
- Previous owners: Rodda Candy Company
- Website: www.peepsbrand.com

Peeps are a marshmallow confection sold in the United States and Canada in the shape of chicks, bunnies, and other animals. They have been produced by candy maker Just Born since 1953. Peeps were the earlier creation of the R. E. Rodda Candy Company of Lancaster, PA, and were offered for sale as early as 1948.

Though primarily promoted at Easter, Peeps have been marketed as "Always in Season", and as such have expanded to Halloween, Christmas and Valentine's Day. Since 2014, the confection has been available year-round with the introduction of Peeps Minis.

Peeps ingredients include sugar, corn syrup, gelatin, food dyes and salt.

== History ==
=== R. E. Rodda Candy Company ===
The R.E. Rodda Candy Company (347 Church Street, Lancaster, Pennsylvania) was founded in 1908, capitalized at $300,000 by financiers from Baltimore, New York, Cincinnati and several Pennsylvania cities. Roscoe E. Rodda (1862-1941), a Board of Directors member and its first president, had previously managed candy manufacture in Detroit and Cincinnati. By 1915 the firm was shipping high-quality products nationwide and to South America and Europe.

By the 1930s-40s, its products included chocolates, hard candies, jelly beans and "jelly eggs". It is uncertain when manufacture of marshmallow items began, but by 1948—and previous to any association of the product with Sam Born or Just Born—Pennsylvania retailers were selling "Rodda marshmallow peeps" or "Rodda Easter peeps".

Though Just Born took over manufacture in 1953 and developed speedy, mechanized production, the product was retailed nationally for decades in the U.S. as "Rodda Marshmallow Peeps" or "Rodda Easter Peeps", retaining the Rodda name into the mid-1990s.

=== Just Born ===
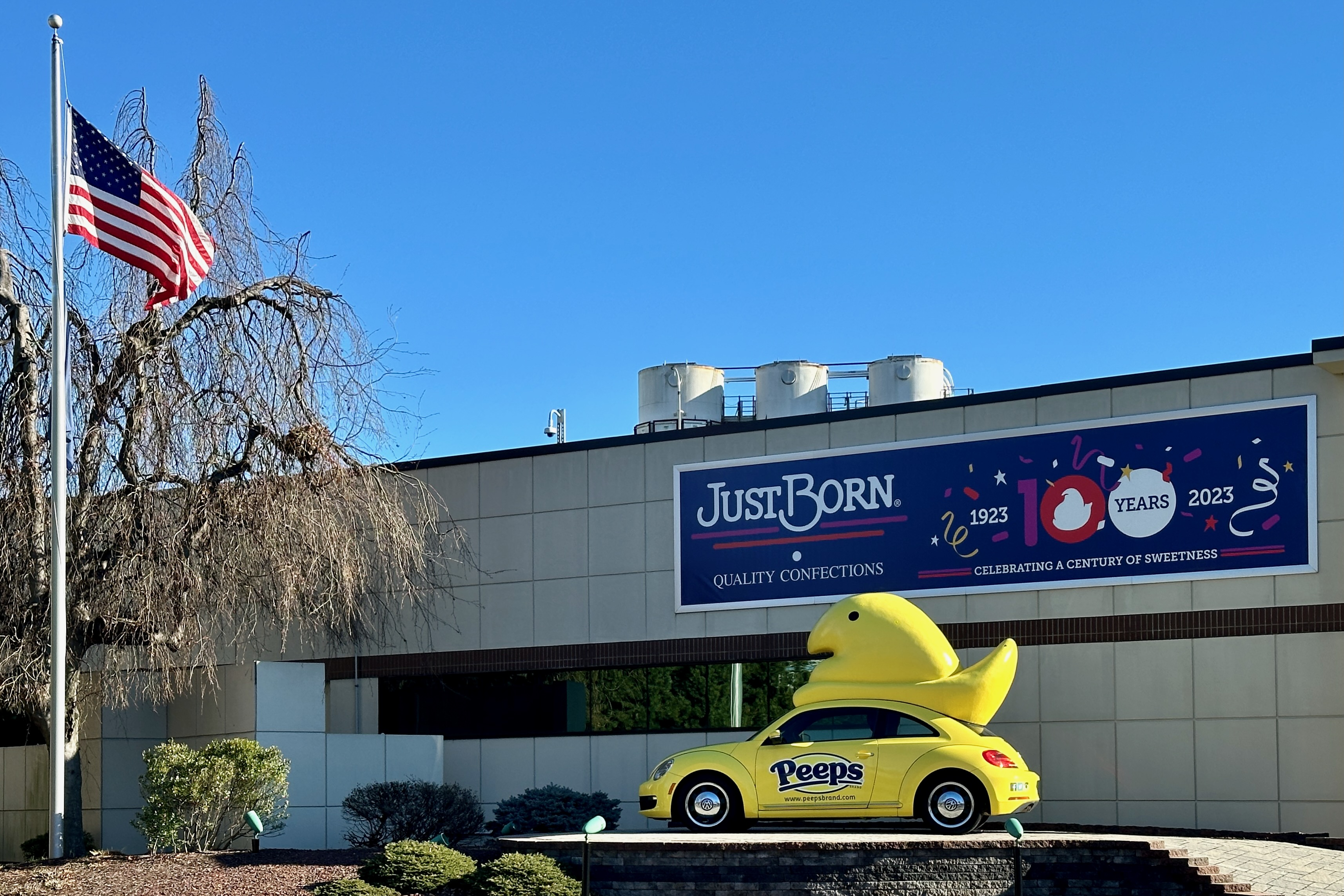
The Just Born headquarters in Bethlehem, Pennsylvania

Peeps are presently produced by Just Born, a candy manufacturer founded in Bethlehem, Pennsylvania, by an immigrant from Vinnitsa in the Russian Empire (now in Ukraine), Sam Born (1891–1959).

In 1953, Just Born acquired the Rodda Candy Company and its marshmallow chick line. Sam's son, Bob Born, replaced the painstaking process of hand-forming the chicks with mass production in 1954. When founder Sam Born displayed a sign for his freshly made candy, he titled it "Just Born", playing off of his last name and the fact that he made his candy fresh daily. According to Mary Bellis, the newly purchased company, Just Born, was soon the "largest marshmallow candy manufacturer in the world".

Just Born began producing other shapes in the 1960s, following seasonal themes. Twenty years later, the Marshmallow Peeps Bunny was released as a popular year-round shape of the candy. The yellow chicks were the original form of the candy — hence their name — but then the company introduced other colors and, eventually, the myriad shapes that are now produced. Peeps were manufactured in different colors, such as lavender starting in 1995 and blue in 1998. Prior to that, they were only being produced in the traditional colors: yellow, pink and white. New flavors such as vanilla, strawberry, and chocolate were introduced between the years of 1999 and 2002.

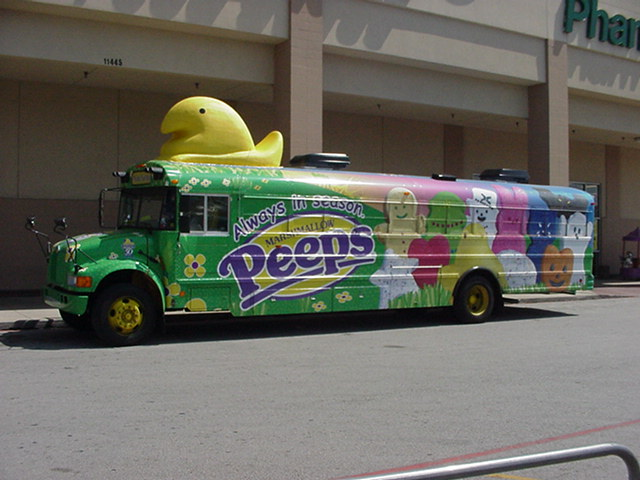
The Peeps Fun Bus

In 2003, the Peeps Fun Bus conducted a tour across the country to promote the brand. The tour included giveaways and games and was decorated with a giant Peep on the top of the bus.

In 2009, Just Born expanded the Peeps product line further by introducing Peeps Lip Balm in four flavors: grape, strawberry, vanilla, and cotton candy. Just Born has come out with several other various accessories. Items such as nail polish, wrist bands, umbrellas, plush toys, golf gloves, earrings, and necklaces are produced and sold online and in retail stores. Other companies have produced items based on the popular Peeps candy. Peeps micro bead pillows were made by Kaboodle and conform to one's shape. The company Kaboodle promises that "they'll last a lot longer than their edible counterpart!" Ranging from infant sizes to adult sizes, Peeps Halloween costumes can also be found on the shelves of several costume stores. The first Peeps & Co. store opened in November 2009 in National Harbor, Maryland, Prince George's County. Peeps & Company retail stores were later opened in Minnesota (as of 2019, shut down due to low profits) and Pennsylvania. In 2014, Peeps Minis were introduced, and were intended to be available year-round.

In 2023, Bob Born, a son of the Just Born founder, died at age 98. He was known as the "Father of Peeps" for automating the production of Peeps.

== Contests and competitions ==
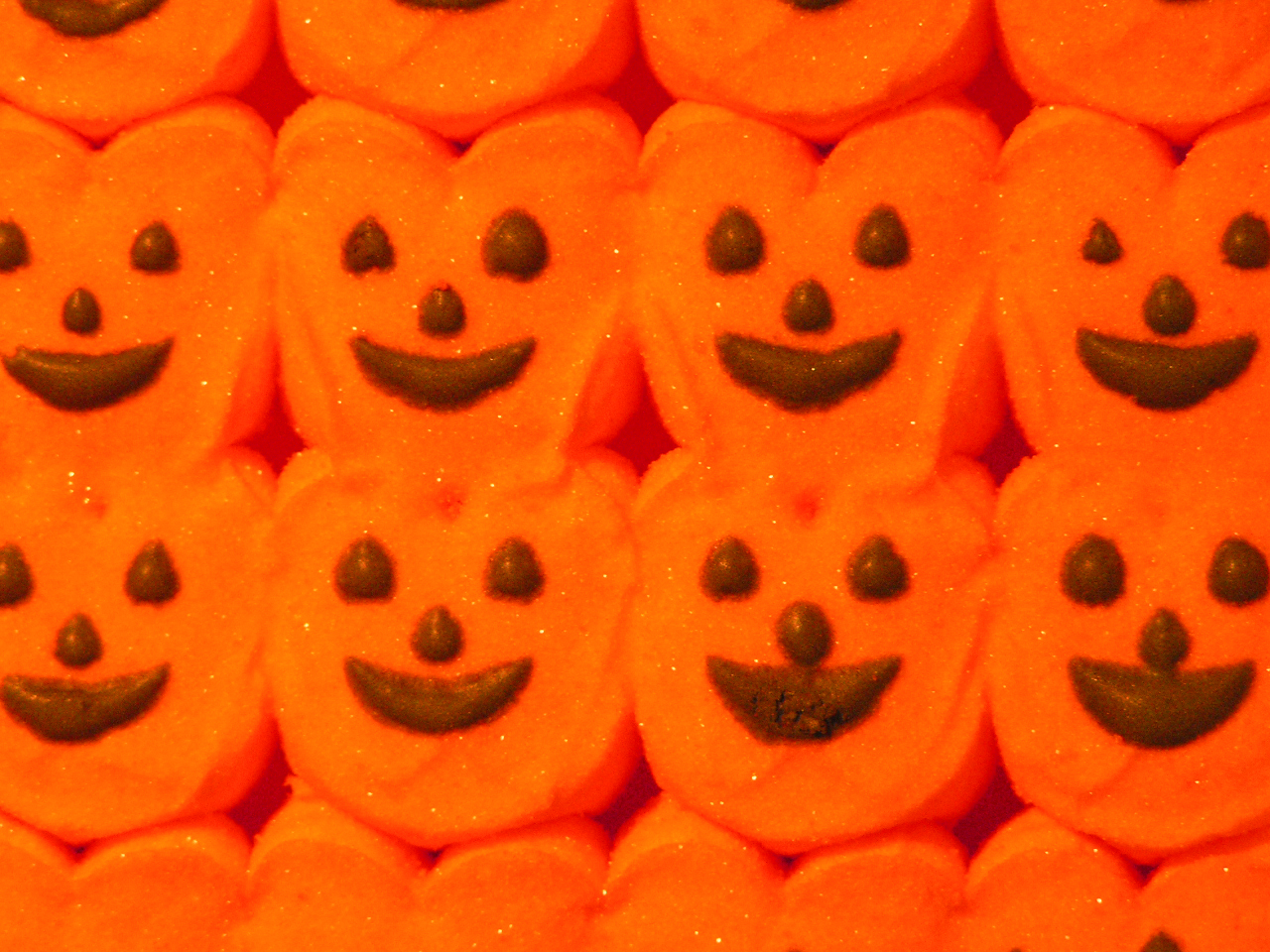
Orange pumpkin Halloween Peeps

A "Peeps Eating" contest is held each year at National Harbor in front of the Peeps & Company store. The 2017 winner, Matt Stonie of California, ate 255 Peeps in five minutes. The first such event was arranged by Shawn Sparks in 1994, and had only six participants. Dave Smith started an annual Peep Off in Sacramento after contacting a participant in the first Peep Off. Another contest in Maryland asks that participants create a diorama of a culturally important scene from the modern era, featuring a number of Peeps. The winner gets two free inflatable life jackets.

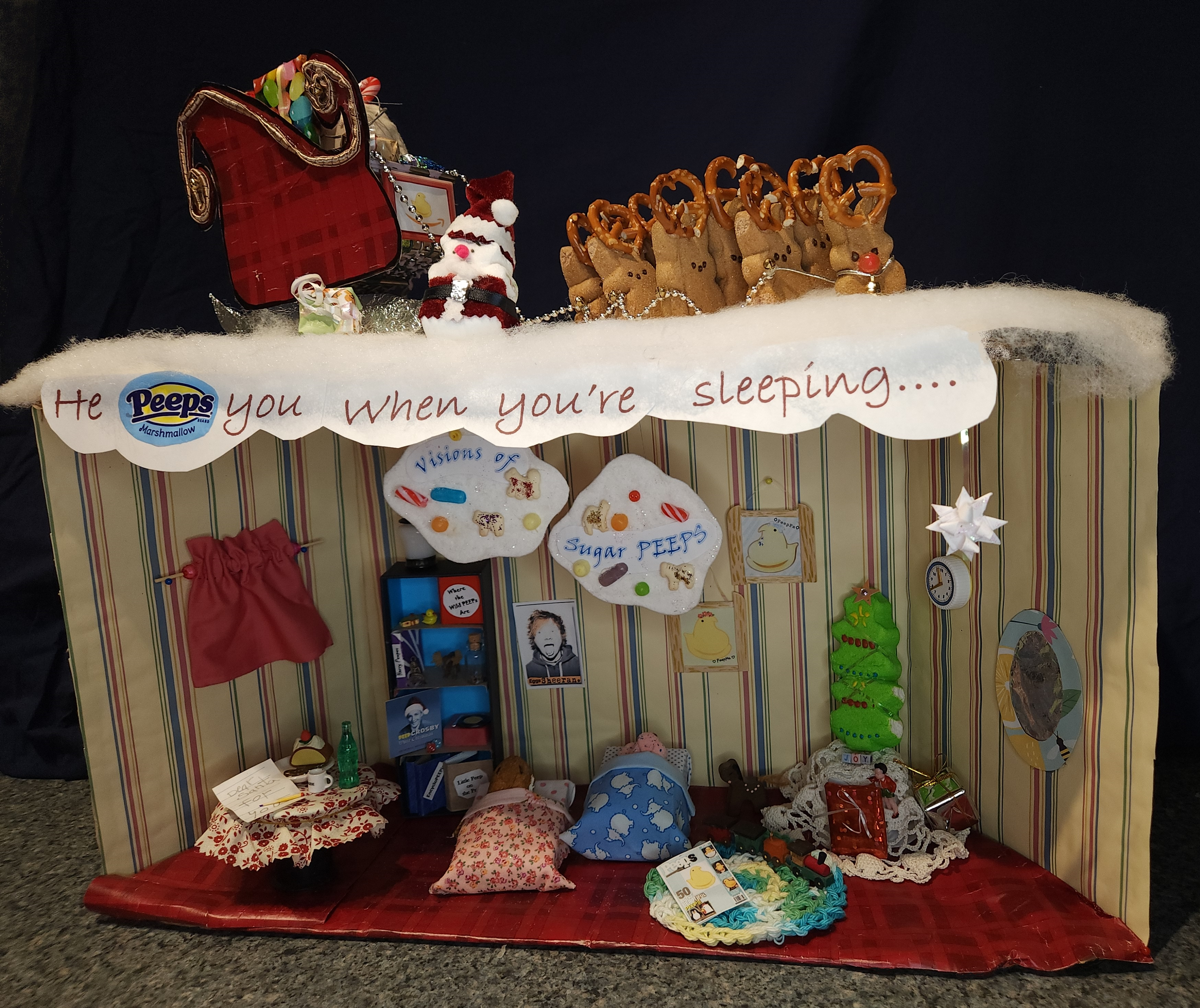
2022 PEEPFEST Diorama Competition

Several newspapers hold annual contests in which readers submit photos of dioramas featuring Peeps. The St. Paul Pioneer Press was the first paper to hold such a contest. Similar contests are put on by The Chicago Tribune, and the Seattle Times. These contests frequently correspond with the Easter holiday. MIT also has a yearly Peeps contest. The Washington Post held an annual contest until 2017, when it was discontinued. However, it was revived on their TikTok in 2021, and has continued since. During the gap, the smaller Washington City Paper introduced their contest in its place.

The Racine Art Museum holds the Annual International Peeps Art Exhibition each April. Anyone can enter the contest, centered on the theme "peep-powered work of art".

The following are other contests held in various states:

- Peeps jousting consists of putting two Marshmallow Chicks into the microwave with wooden sticks stuck into both. The winner is the one that gets the biggest and therefore affects/deforms the other.
- "Peepza" is a dessert pizza made with Peeps.

Blogs were created according to Fox News entitled "101 Fun Ways to Torture a Peep."

== Alleged indestructibility ==
Peeps are sometimes jokingly described as "indestructible". In 1999 scientists at Emory University jokingly performed experiments on batches of Peeps to see how easily they could be dissolved, burned or otherwise disintegrated, using such agents as cigarette smoke, boiling water and liquid nitrogen. In addition to discussing whether Peeps migrate or evolve, they claimed that the eyes of the confectionery "wouldn't dissolve in anything". One website claims that Peeps are insoluble in acetone, water, diluted sulfuric acid, and sodium hydroxide (the site also claims that the Peeps experimental subjects sign release forms). Concentrated sulfuric acid seems to have effects similar to the expected effects of sulfuric acid on sugar.

This debate was featured in an episode of the sitcom Malcolm in the Middle ("Traffic Jam"), in which Francis insists that "Quacks" (as they are named in the show) would dissolve in his stomach rather than expand, and takes up the dare of eating 100 of them and while he does so, he gets very sick.

When exposed to air, marshmallow dehydrates and becomes "stale" and slightly crunchy. According to Just Born, 25%–30% of their customers prefer eating Peeps stale.

== Public relations ==
Barry Church, a football player for the Dallas Cowboys, was unable to attend training camp due to an unexpected root canal caused by eating Jolly Ranchers. Just Born offered Church a season's supply of their product—in that marshmallows are a lot softer on the teeth.

== Recipes using Peeps ==
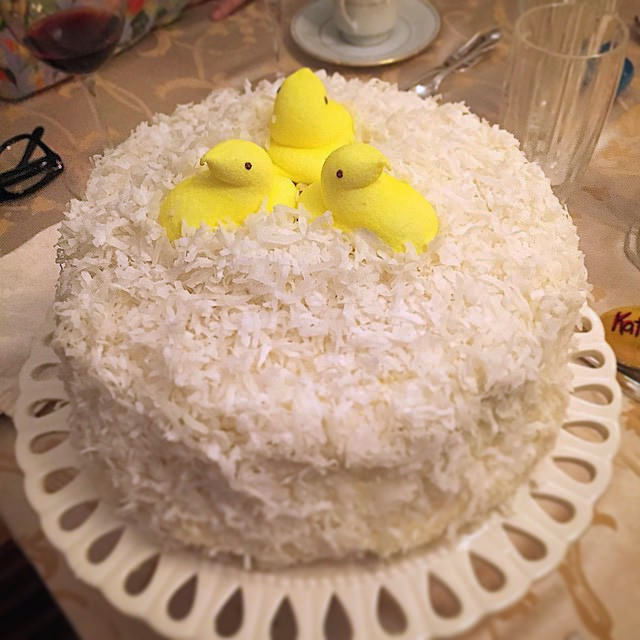
A coconut cake garnished with Peeps candy

Several recipes and creative ideas to alter Peeps have been invented. Fox News Magazine published an article in 2013 including several recipes from various creators, including Peeps smores, Peeps pancakes, home-made chocolate covered Peeps, Peeps marshmallow chocolate chip cookies, Peeps brownies, Peeps popcorn, Peeps frosting, Peeps Krispie Treats, and Peeps syrup.

Peeps can also be used as a marshmallow topper for hot chocolate.

A recipe for "Peepshi" involves placing a Peep onto a Rice Krispie Treat and wrapping it in a Fruit by the Foot, to create a single "Peepshi roll" in the style of a sushi roll.

In April 2017, several internet and Twitter postings, and TV news stories claimed 'outrage' that Peeps were being used as a pizza topping.

In March 2021, Just Born and Pepsico (maker of Pepsi products) announced a "limited edition" of "Peeps marshmallow cola" soft drinks.

== Film adaptation ==
On April 22, 2014, Adam Rifkin acquired the feature film and TV rights to the classic candies to make a franchise of it. Then, on April 5, 2021, it was announced that Wonder Street has acquired the rights to the candies with David Goldblum writing and producing alongside Christine and Mark Holder. The film's plot centered around a ragtag group of Peeps characters who set out on a cross-country journey in order to attend Peepsfest, an annual brand celebration in Pennsylvania.

== See also ==
- List of confectionery brands
- Flumps, a UK brand of rope shaped marshmallow candy.
- Circus Peanut, an old fashioned peanut shaped marshmallow candy.
