= Carolyne Wright =

American poet (born 1949)

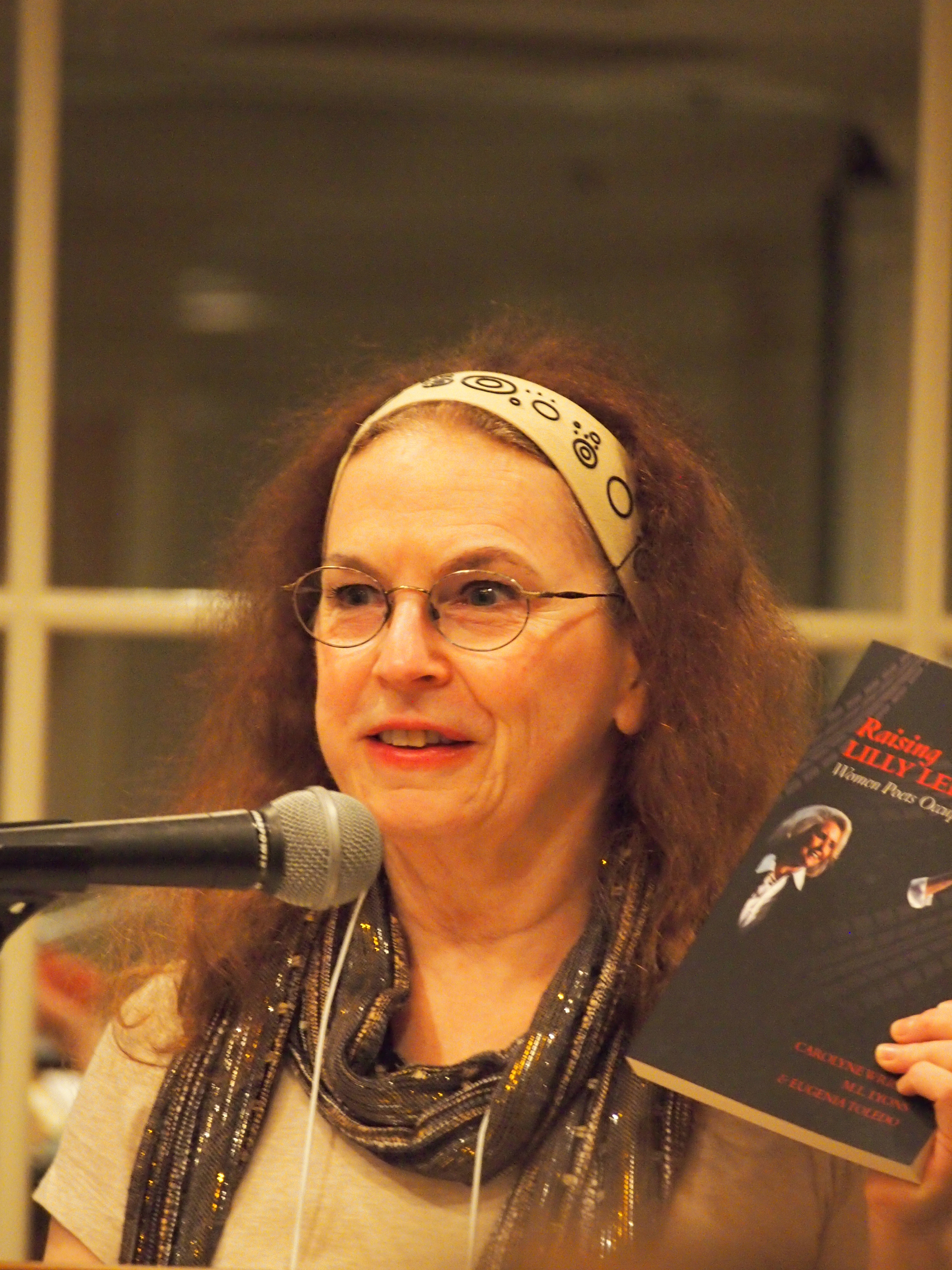
- Born: 1949 (age 76–77); Bellingham, Washington, U.S.
- Education: Seattle University, New York University; Syracuse University
- Writing career
- Language: English
- Genre: Poetry

Carolyne Wright (born in 1949, in Bellingham, Washington) is an American poet.

== Life ==
She studied at Seattle University, New York University, and graduated from Syracuse University with master's and doctoral degrees.

She has held visiting creative writing posts at Radcliffe College, Sweet Briar College, Emory University, University of Wyoming, University of Miami, Oklahoma State University, University of Central Oklahoma, University of Oklahoma, The College of Wooster, and Cleveland State University.

She is translation editor of Artful Dodge. Her work appeared in AGNI, Artful Dodge, Hotel Amerika, Hunger Mountain, Iowa Review, Michigan Quarterly Review, New England Review, New Orleans Review, North American Review, Poetry, Poets & Writers, Southern Review.

From 2004 to 2008, she served on the board of directors of the Association of Writers & Writing Programs (AWP). Since 2005, she teaches at the Whidbey Writers Workshop. In 2008, she is Thornton Poet in Residence at Lynchburg College, and Distinguished Northwest Poet at Seattle University. She lives in Seattle.

== Awards ==
- Writing Fellow at the Fine Arts Work Center
- Vermont Studio Center Fellowship
- Yaddo Fellowship
- Fulbright Study Grant in Chile, during the presidency of Salvador Allende
- Indo-U.S. Subcommission and Fulbright Senior Research fellowships in Calcutta and Dhaka, Bangladesh
- Witter Bynner Foundation Grant, for A Bouquet of Roses on the Burning Ground
- NEA Fellowship in Translation, for A Bouquet of Roses on the Burning Ground
- Bunting Institute of Radcliffe College Fellowship, for A Bouquet of Roses on the Burning Ground
- Alice Fay di Castagnola Award from the Poetry Society of America, for A Change of Maps
- 2007 Independent Book Publishers Bronze Award for Poetry, for A Change of Maps
- Blue Lynx Prize
- Oklahoma Book Award in Poetry
- 2001 American Book Award from the Before Columbus Foundation.
- PEN/Jerard Fund Award and the Crossing Boundaries Award from International Quarterly for The Road to Isla Negra

== Works ==
- Masquerade (Lost Horse Press, 2021)
- A Change of Maps (Lost Horse Press, 2006)
- Seasons of Mangoes and Brainfire. Lynx House Press. 2000. ISBN 978-0-89924-106-7. (2nd edition 2005)
- Premonitions of an Uneasy Guest. Hardin-Simmons University Press. 1983. ISBN 978-0-910075-02-2. (AWP Award Series)
- Dale K. Boyer, ed. (1978). Stealing the Children. Ahsahta Press. ISBN 978-0-916272-09-8., an invitational chapbook
- Carolyne Wright: Greatest Hits 1975-2001. Pudding House Publications. 2002. ISBN 978-1-58998-085-3.
- A Choice of Fidelities: Lectures and Readings from a Writer's Life (Ashland Poetry Press)

=== Anthologies ===
- Majestic Nights: Love Poems of Bengali Women. Translated by Carolyne Wright. White Pine Press. 2008. ISBN 9781893996939.
- A Bouquet of Roses on the Burning Ground
- David Wagoner; David Lehman, eds. (2009). "This dream the world is having about itself...". The Best American Poetry 2009. Simon and Schuster. ISBN 978-0-7432-9976-3.

=== Memoir ===
- The Road to Isla Negra

=== Translations ===
- "House", NABANEETA DEV SEN, Blackbird, Fall 2009
- "Mysteries of Memory", NABANEETA DEV SEN, Blackbird, Fall 2009
- Anuradha Mahapatra (1996). Another spring, darkness: selected poems of Anuradha Mahapatra. Translated by Carolyne Wright; Paramita Banerjee; Jyotirmoy Datta. CALYX Books. ISBN 978-0-934971-51-5.
- Jorge Teillier (1993). In order to talk with the dead: selected poems of Jorge Teillier. Translated by Carolyne Wright. University of Texas Press. ISBN 978-0-292-73867-6.
- Tasalimā Nāsarina (1992). Light up at midnight: selected poems. Translated by Carolyne Wright. Biddyaprakash.
- Stephen Tapscott, ed. (1996). Twentieth-century Latin American poetry: a bilingual anthology. University of Texas Press. ISBN 978-0-292-78140-5. "Carolyne Wright."
