= Bleury =

Commune in Eure-et-Loir, France

- Part of Auneau-Bleury-Saint-Symphorien
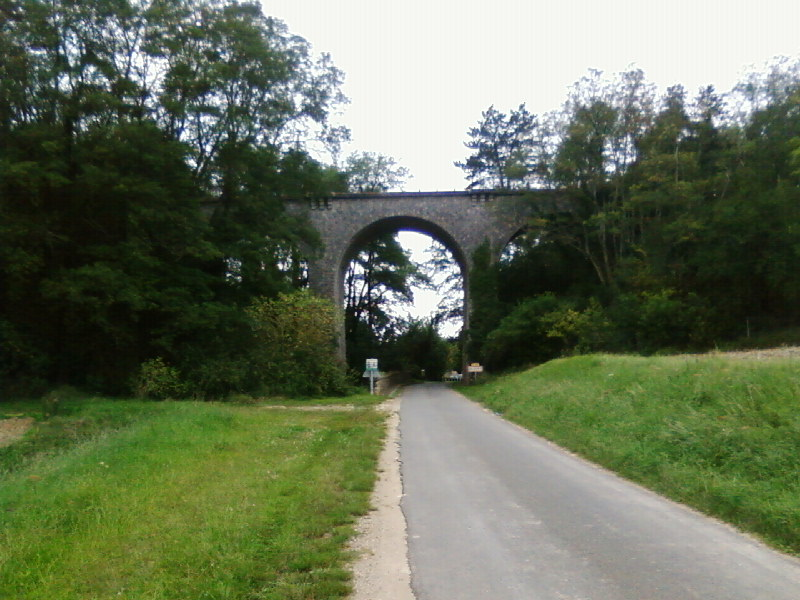
- Viaduct
- Location of Bleury
- Location within France Location within Centre-Val de Loire
- Coordinates: 48°31′14″N 1°44′54″E
- Country: France
- Region: Centre-Val de Loire
- Department: Eure-et-Loir
- Arrondissement: Chartres
- Canton: Auneau
- Commune: Auneau-Bleury-Saint-Symphorien
- Area^{1}: 7.85 km^{2} (3.03 sq mi)
- Elevation: 128 m (420 ft)
- Highest elevation: 156 m (512 ft)
- Lowest elevation: 113 m (371 ft)
- Population (2016): 405
  - Density: 51.6/km^{2} (134/sq mi)
- Time zone: UTC+01:00 (CET)
  - Summer (DST): UTC+02:00 (CEST)
- Postal code: 28700
- ^{1} French Land Register data, which excludes lakes, ponds, glaciers > 1 km^{2} (0.386 sq mi or 247 acres) and river estuaries.

Bleury (French pronunciation: [blœʁi]) is a former commune in the Eure-et-Loir department in northern France. In January 2012 it merged with Saint-Symphorien-le-Château into the new commune Bleury-Saint-Symphorien, which was merged into Auneau-Bleury-Saint-Symphorien on 1 January 2016.

== See also ==
- Communes of the Eure-et-Loir department
