= Bourne End =

Bourne End is the name of more than one place. It is an old English name, referring to the point where two rivers join.

== Places ==
In the United Kingdom:

- Bourne End, Bletsoe, Bedfordshire, England
- Bourne End, Cranfield, Bedfordshire, England
- Bourne End, Buckinghamshire, England (Bourne End upon Thames)
- Bourne End, Hertfordshire, England

== Other uses ==
- Bourne End Academy, Bourne End, Buckinghamshire, England, UK; a secondary school
- Bourne End railway station, Bourne End, Buckinghamshire, England, UK;
- Bourne End Railway Bridge, Bourne End, Buckinghamshire, England, UK; over the River Thames

== See also ==
- Wooburn and Bourne End, Buckinghamshire, England, UK; a civil parish
- Bourne End rail crash (1945) at Bourne End turnout, Hemel, Hempstead, England, UK
- Bourne (disambiguation)
