= Just Born =

American candy company

Just Born, Inc.

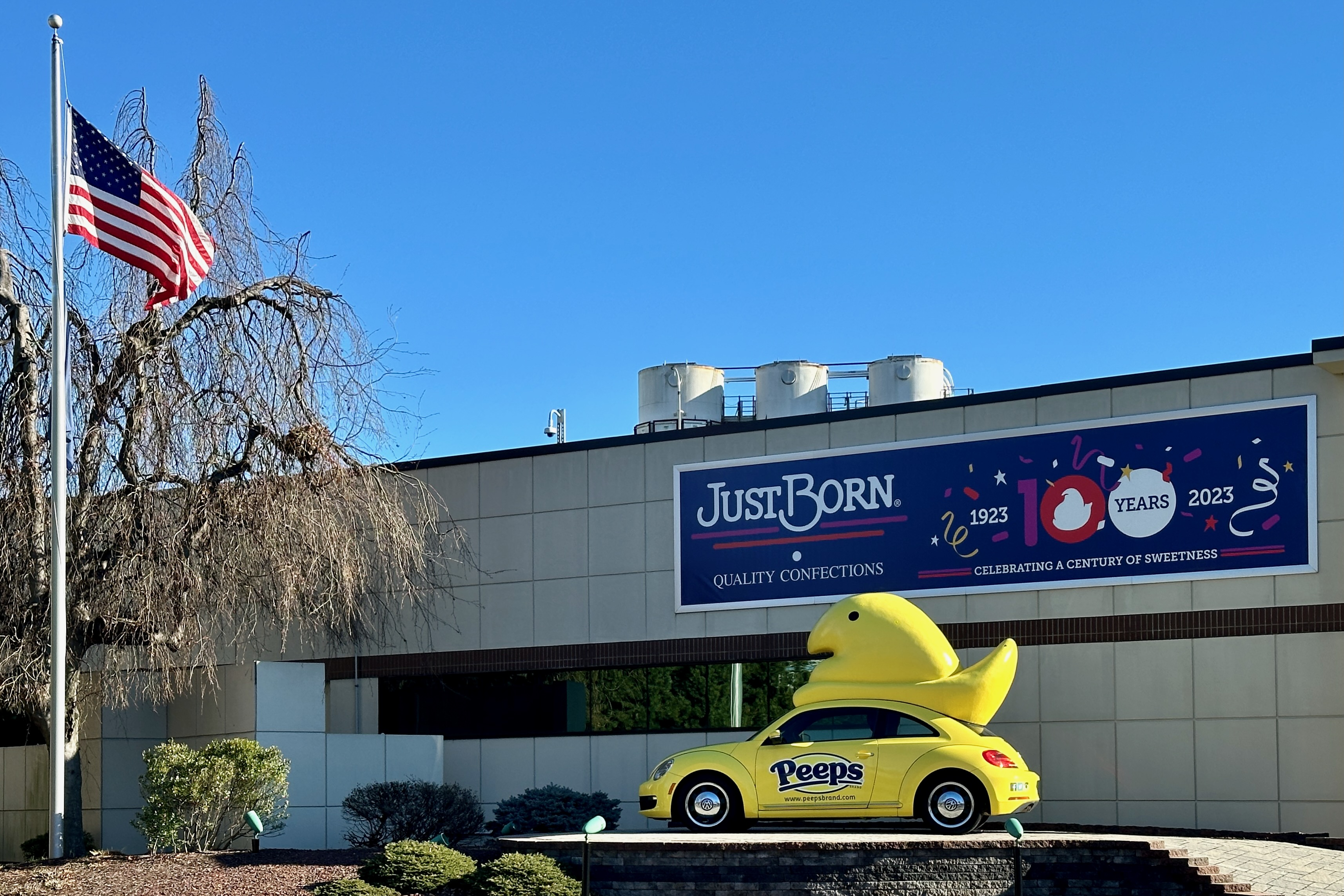
- Type: Private; family business
- Industry: Confectionery production
- Founded: 1923; 103 years ago in New York City, New York, United States
- Founder: Sam Born
- Headquarters: 1300 Stefko Boulevard, Bethlehem, Pennsylvania, United States
- Area served: United States
- Key people: David Shaffer (Chairman & Co-CEO); Gardner Jett, Jr. (Co-CEO)
- Products: Candies
- Revenue: US$301 million (2021)
- Owner: Shaffer family
- Number of employees: 600 (2021)
- Website: www.justborn.com

Just Born, Inc., is an American family-owned confectionery company based in Bethlehem, Pennsylvania. It manufactures and markets a number of confectionery, including Goldenberg's Peanut Chews, Hot Tamales, Mike and Ike, Peeps and Teenee Beanee jelly beans.

Advertising its products with the slogan "a great candy isn't made ... it's Just Born," the company was ranked as the 10th largest candy company in the United States, as of 2013.

== History ==
Russian-Jewish immigrant Sam Born (1891–1959) came to the United States in December 1909. He moved to San Francisco, where, in 1916, Born was awarded the "key to the city" of San Francisco for inventing the Born Sucker Machine, a machine that mechanically inserted sticks into lollipops.

In 1917, Born started a small retail store in Brooklyn, New York. He displayed in his store window an evolving line of daily-made candy, advertising its freshness with a sign that declared Just Born. The original company symbol showed a baby resting in a candy measuring scale. Sam Born is also credited with the invention of chocolate sprinkles, known as "jimmies," and the hard coating on ice cream bars.

In 1923, Born started his own manufacturing company in New York City. Irv and Jack Shaffer, Born's brothers-in-law, joined the company to help market and sell the confections. In 1932, the trio relocated operations to Bethlehem, Pennsylvania. The company bought a four-story, 224,396 sq. ft. building, built during 1920, from a bankrupt printing company.

Sam Born's son, Bob Born, joined the company in 1945, and would later become the company's president for more than 30 years. He was part of the two-man team that mechanized the process forming Peeps, allowing a substantial increase of production, causing Just Born to become America's largest manufacturer of seasonal marshmallow confections. Bob Born died at age 98 on January 29, 2023.

In 1953, the company acquired Rodda Candy Co. of Lancaster County; a manufacturer of jelly beans, as well as a seasonal (Easter) marshmallow candy: Peeps. Just Born later mechanized the product manufacture and eventually generalized its advertising for year-round sales.

In 2003, the company purchased the Goldenberg Candy Company, retaining its Philadelphia factory. Just Born originally re-branded Goldenberg's Peanut Chews as a Just Born product, deleting references to the name Goldenberg, which the company later restored.

== Union and pension disputes ==
On September 2, 2016, members of the Bakery, Confectionery, Tobacco Workers and Grain Millers International Union Local 6 voted to strike on Sept. 7 after unanimously rejecting the company's most recent contract offer. Most workers resumed their jobs on September 30, although no final agreement had been made.

At the basis of the dispute is the company's attempt to withdraw future employees from a multi-employer pension fund named the Bakery and Confectionery Union and Industrial International Pension Fund. Such a withdrawal requires the employer to pay a US$60 million withdrawal fee (to fund future retirees), which Just Born has gone to court to avoid paying.
