= Alfred Bourne =

Alfred Bourne may refer to:

- Alfred Bourne (cricketer) (1848–1931), English cricketer
- Alfred Bourne (footballer) (1894–1939), English footballer
- Alfred Gibbs Bourne (1859–1940), British zoologist, botanist and educator
