= Sam Born =

American businessman and candy maker (1891–1959)

- Born: Samuel Bernstein; September 10, 1891; Vinnitsia, Ukraine Russian Empire
- Died: March 23, 1959 (aged 67); MV Britannic, Atlantic Ocean
- Occupations: Businessman; candy maker; inventor
- Known for: Just Born
- Spouse: Ann Shaffer
- Children: Bob Born

Sam Born (September 10, 1891 – March 23, 1959) was a Ukrainian-American businessman and candy maker.

== Biography ==
Samuel Bernstein was born into a Jewish family in Vinnitsia, Russian Empire (now Vinnytsia in Ukraine). He had been a rabbinical student from Berdichev, Ukraine, before his family fled to Paris, France, where he learned the art of chocolate-making.

Under his original name Samuel Bernstein, he immigrated to the United States in December 1909. He sailed on the S/S Merion from Liverpool to Philadelphia; on the ship's passenger list, his occupation was listed as "candy maker".

In 1916 Sam Born was awarded the "key to the city" of San Francisco for inventing a machine that mechanically inserted sticks into lollipops.

=== Just Born ===
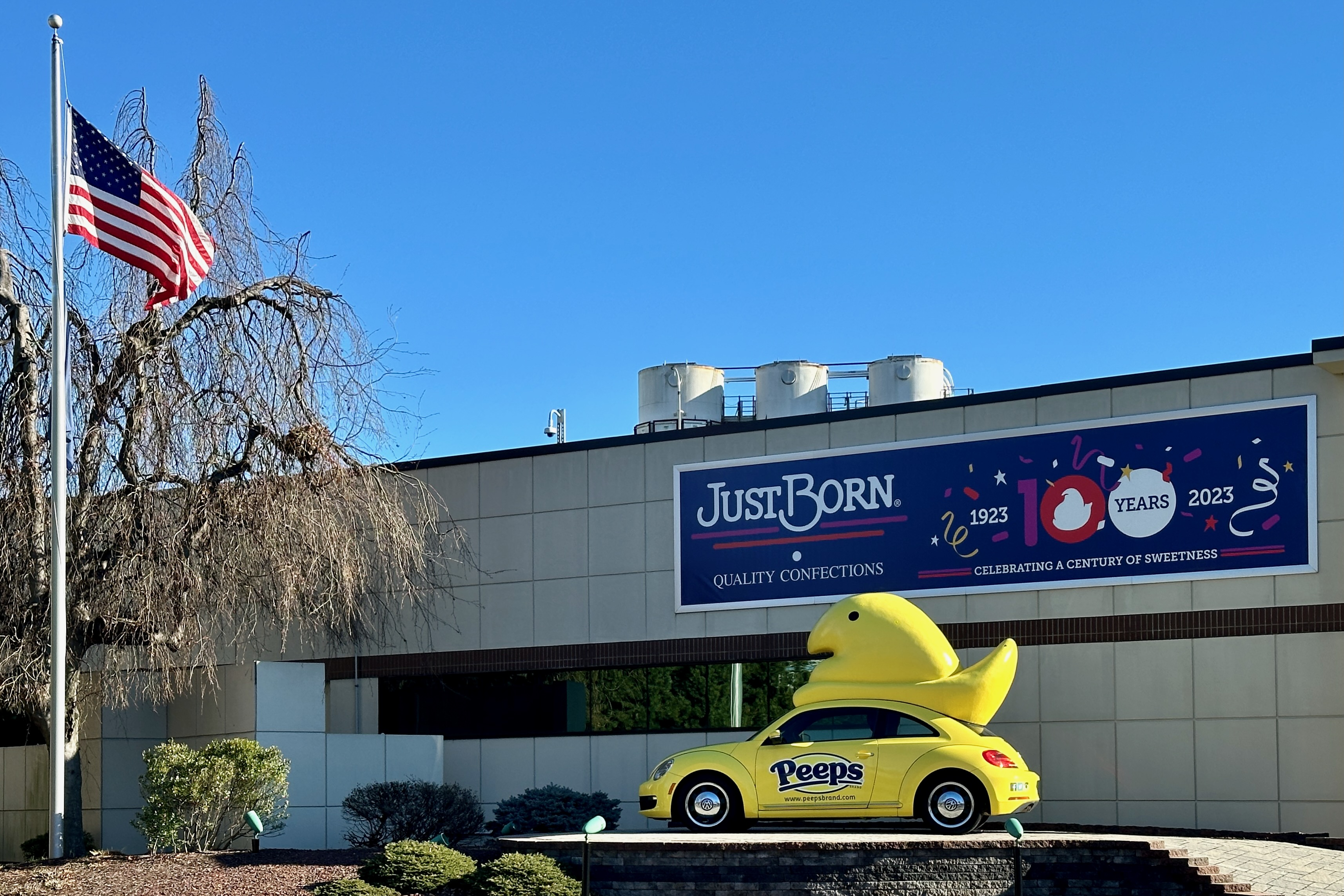
Just Born building in Bethlehem, where Peeps are made

In 1923 he founded the Just Born company in Brooklyn, New York, a candy manufacturer that still manufactures Peeps, Mike and Ike, and Hot Tamales. After opening a factory and store in Brooklyn, Sam brought his brothers-in-law, Irv and Jack Shaffer, into the business. He relocated the firm to Bethlehem, Pennsylvania, in 1932.

=== Death and legacy ===
In March 1959 Born died on board the Cunard liner Britannic while it was at sea, having departed from Lisbon en route to Southampton. He and his wife, Ann Shaffer, were on the last lap of a 14,000 mile world cruise, according to his obituary which appeared in The Morning Call, on March 24, 1959.

His son, Bob Born, became president of the company in 1959. As of February 2023, David Shaffer, a nephew of Born's, is the board chair and co-CEO of Just Born.
