= London Bourne =

Barbadian slave & merchant (c.1793–1869)

London Bourne (c. 1793–1869) was a former Barbadian slave who became a wealthy merchant and abolitionist.

== Early life ==
London Bourne was born a slave in Barbados in about 1793. He was the son of William Bourne who had also been a slave. Through his work as an artisan and businessman, William Bourne was able to put aside enough money to purchase his own freedom. By the time of London Bourne's birth, William Bourne had already become a successful businessman who owned a number of properties. London Bourne was a slave until he was twenty-three or twenty-five years old, at which time he was purchased by his father for the sum of five hundred dollars. His mother and four brothers were bought by his father at the same time for two thousand five hundred dollars.

== Business life ==
By the late 1820s, with stores and a sugar brokerage business, London Bourne was already considered one of the wealthiest merchants in Bridgetown. By 1837 London Bourne was known to have owned three stores in Bridgetown, and had a net worth of between twenty and thirty thousand dollars. His business included mercantile agents in England with a branch within the City of London employing English clerks. The fact that a black man would have white employees was considered surprising at the time. Bourne also did some business giving loans to both black and white customers. In 1841, in what appears to be his first move into landholding outside of Bridgetown, Bourne bought a 169-acre plantation in St. Michael for 7,428 pounds. Bourne bought a second plantation in 1856.

"Colored merchants of wealth were shut out of the merchants' exchange, though possessed of untarnished integrity, while white men were admitted as subscribers without regard to character. It was not a little remarkable that the rooms occupied as the merchants' exchange, were rented from a colored gentleman, or more properly, a negro;* who, though himself a merchant of extensive business at home and abroad, and occupying the floor below with a store, was not suffered to set his foot within them. This merchant, it will be re membered, is educating a son for a learned profession at the university of Edinburgh."

== Political life ==
"If the white people would deign to make the trial," said Mr. B., "and would suffer themselves to dine with us but occasionally, we are confident they would have a better opinion of us."

In the mid 1820s, Bourne was a member of the St. Mary's Society for the Education of the Coloured Poor in the Principles of the Established Church and for other Charitable Relief.

In 1840, Bourne was a member of the Barbados Auxiliary Anti-Slavery Society. He was also considered to be a strong and active supporter of Afro-Barbadian civil rights activist Samuel Jackman Prescod.

== Personal life ==
London Bourne was married in 1822 to a free, property-owning black woman named Patience Graham with whom he had seven children.

== Death ==
London Bourne died at the age of 76. Despite considerable business losses in the late 1850s, Bourne was still quite wealthy and had substantial property holdings at the time of his death.

== Honors and public recognition ==
In 1997, after the demolition of Bourne's primary business address known as the Exchange building in order to create a low-income housing development, the development was subsequently named London Bourne Towers in his honor.

== Bibliography ==
- Melanie J. Newton (Jun 1, 2008): "The Children of Africa in the Colonies: Free People of Color in Barbados in the Age of Emancipation". LSU Press
- Woodville Marshall (1993): "Emancipation IV: A Series of Lectures to Commemorate the 150th Anniversary of Emancipation, Volume 4". Canoe Press
- American Anti-Slavery Society (December 31, 1838): "Emancipation in the West Indies, in 1838".
- Edward A. S.C.M. Stoute (1989): "Glimpses of Old Barbados, 2nd edition". Barbados National Trust
- Sean Carrington, Henry Fraser, John Gilmore (May 1, 2004): "A-Z of Barbados Heritage 2 edition". MacMillan Caribbean
- Keith Hanley, Greg Kucich (Oct 31, 2013): "Nineteenth-Century Worlds: Global formations past and present". Routledge
- Pedro L. V. Welch (2003): "Slave society in the city: Bridgetown, Barbados, 1680-1834". Ian Randle Publishers
- American Anti-Slavery Society "The Anti-Slavery Examiner, Part 2 of 4".
- Thomas Fiehrer, Michael Lodwick (1998): "Plantation Society in the Americas, Volume 5". T. Fiehrer
- "The Bajan and South Caribbean, Issue 293; Issues 296-298; Issue 305".Carib Publicity, 1978
- "The Christian remembrancer; or, The Churchman's Biblical, ecclesiastical & literary miscellany" (January 1, 1831)
- "The Journal of the Barbados Museum and Historical Society, Volumes 43-45".Barbados Museum and Historical Society, 1997
- Wilson Armistead (January 1, 1848): "A Tribute for the Negro: Being a Vindication of the Moral, Intellectual, and Religious Capabilities of the Coloured Portion of Mankind; with Particular Reference to the African Race". Greenwood Press
- A. H. Maltby (1838): "The Quarterly Christian Spectator, Volume 10"
- Great Britain. Colonial office (1839): "Papers relative to the West Indies: ordered, by the House of commons, to be printed 15 March 1839, Part 4". Great Britain
- Alan West (2003): "African Caribbeans: A Reference Guide". Greenwood Publishing Group
- Dr. Cecilia Karch Brathwaite (2007): "London Bourne of Barbados (1793–1869)". "Slavery & Abolition Volume 28, Issue 1, 2007" "pages 23-40"
- Geraldine Lane (December 1, 2009): "Tracing Your Ancestors in Barbados. A Practical Guide". Genealogical Publishing Company
- Kathleen Mary Butler (May 1, 1995): "Economics of Emancipation: Jamaica and Barbados, 1823-1843". University of North Carolina Press
- Hilary Beckles (2004): "Great House Rules: Landless Emancipation and Workers' Protest in Barbados, 1838-1938". Ian Randle Publishers
- James Armstrong Thome, Joseph Horace Kimball, American Anti-Slavery Society (1838): "Emancipation in the West Indies: A six months' tour in Antigua, Barbadoes, and Jamaica in the year 1837". American Anti-Slavery Society
