= Robert Burne =

American microbiologist

Robert A. Burne is an American microbiologist focusing on molecular mechanisms governing the ability of bacteria that are capable of causing disease in humans to modulate their virulence in response to environmental influences. As of 2017 he was a distinguished professor at University of Florida.

Burne received a B.S. in microbiology from Pennsylvania State University in 1981, and a Ph.D. in microbiology and immunology from the University of Rochester in 1987.
