= Bourne Park =

Bourne Park may refer to:

- Bourne Park (football ground), former home of Sittingbourne F.C.
- Bourne Park House, a country house on Bourne Park Road, between Bishopsbourne and Bridge near Canterbury in Kent
- Bishopsbourne Paddock, a cricket ground in the grounds of Bourne Park House
- Bourne Park Reed Beds, a Local Nature Reserve on the southern outskirts of Ipswich in Suffolk
