= Charles Bourne (footballer) =

Australian rules footballer

Personal information
- Full name: William Charles Bourne
- Born: 13 February 1882; Warrnambool, Victoria
- Died: 20 May 1930 (aged 48); South Yarra, Victoria
- Original team: Frankston

Playing career^{1}
Years	Club	Games (Goals)
1903	South Melbourne	1 (0)
- ^{1} Playing statistics correct to the end of 1903.

William Charles Bourne (13 February 1882 – 20 May 1930) was an Australian rules footballer who played with South Melbourne in the Victorian Football League (VFL).

After his brief football career Bourne served at Gallipoli and in France during World War I, suffering a fractured back and being shot in the hand and the hip in an eventful military service period.
