= Borne, North Brabant =

Coordinates: 51°37′12″N 5°25′0″E

Borne is a hamlet in the Dutch province of North Brabant. It is located in the municipality of Meierijstad, just to the west of the centre of the town of Schijndel.
