= François Borne =

French flautist (1840-1920)

François Borne (1840–1920), sometimes spelled Bourne, was a French flautist playing with the orchestra of Grand Théâtre de Bordeaux, composer and professor at "Conservatoire de Musique de Toulouse" (High School for Music in Toulouse). He is recognized for technical improvements to the flute. Furthermore, he is remembered today for his composition Fantasie Brillante on Themes from Bizet's Carmen which is a staple of the Romantic flute repertoire.

== Other Compositions ==
- Ballade et danse des lutins, for flute & piano
- Confidence, Op.12
