= River Bourne =

River Bourne may refer to:

- River Bourne, Dorset, a river in Dorset that gives its name to Bournemouth
- River Bourne, Wiltshire, a tributary of the River Avon in the English county of Wiltshire
- River Bourne, Berkshire, a tributary of the River Pang in the English county of Berkshire
- Bourne Eau, a tributary of the River Welland in Lincolnshire
- River Bourne, a tributary of the Thames in Surrey that has two branches:
  - River Bourne, Chertsey, which flows through Chertsey
  - River Bourne, Addlestone, which flows through Chobham and Addlestone
- River Bourne, France, in the Vercors Massif in south-east of France
- River Bourne, Kent, a tributary of the River Medway
- River Bourne, Warwickshire, a tributary of the River Tame, West Midlands
