= Edmund Bourne =

American past psychologist

Edmund J. Bourne is an American self-help author and researcher on anxiety, anxiety disorders and the treatment of anxiety disorders. He was the director of The Anxiety and Treatment Center in San Jose and Santa Rosa, California. In 1990, Edmund Bourne published The Anxiety and Phobia Workbook, a self-help book that won the Benjamin Franklin Book Award for Excellence in Psychology. This book is now in its 8th Edition.

He lives in San Diego, CA.

== Personal life ==
Bourne no longer lives in Boca Raton, Florida with his wife, Tatyanna Peterson. He moved to San Diego California following the death of his wife in the autumn of 2023. He was born in Akron, Ohio, completing a B.A. in philosophy at Colgate University and a Ph.D. in Behavioral Sciences at The University of Chicago. He also completed a postdoctoral fellowship at the former Michael Reese Medical Center in Chicago.

He has authored several journal articles, book chapters, and books, including ''Anxiety & Phobia Workbook''. The workbook presents a range of approaches to managing anxiety disorders. It has reportedly sold more than 1.5 million copies and has been translated into over a dozen languages.

== Published works ==
- The Anxiety and Phobia Workbook, 8th Edition (2025)
- Coping with Anxiety, 2nd Edition (2016)
- Global Shift: How a New Worldview Is Transforming Humanity (2008)
- Natural Relief for Anxiety (2004)
- Beyond Anxiety and Phobia (2001)

- Healing Fear: New Approaches to Overcoming Anxiety (1998)
- Overcoming Specific Phobia (1998)
