= Frederick Bourne =

Frederick Bourne may refer to:

- Sir Frederick Chalmers Bourne (1891–1977), English colonial administrator in India (son of Frederick Samuel Augustus Bourne)
- Frederick Gilbert Bourne (1851–1919), president of the Singer Manufacturing Company
- Frederick Munroe Bourne (1910–1992), Canadian Olympic swimmer
- Sir Frederick Samuel Augustus Bourne (1854–1940), Judge of the British Supreme Court for China and Japan
- Frederick William Bourne (1830–1905), English preacher and author
