= Frank Card Bourne =

American classicist (1914–1983)

Frank Card Bourne (17 July 1914 - 1983) was an American classicist.

== Life ==
He was born on 17 July 1914. His parents were Moses Avander and Grace Winchester.

He died in 1983.

== Career ==
He graduated from Princeton University with his bachelor's degree in 1936 and a PhD in 1941. He was the Kennedy Foundation Professor of Latin Language and Literature there from 1946 to 1976.

== Bibliography ==
Some of his books are:

- A history of the Romans
- The public works of the Julio-Claudians and Flavians
- The Roman alimentary program and Italian agriculture
- The Corpus of roman law, Ancient roman statutes
