= Charlie Bourne =

Australian rules footballer, born 1906

Personal information
- Full name: Charlie Bourne
- Born: 29 October 1906
- Died: 19 January 1958 (aged 51)
- Original team: Armadale

Playing career^{1}
Years	Club	Games (Goals)
1933	St Kilda	2 (0)
- ^{1} Playing statistics correct to the end of 1933.

Charlie Bourne (29 October 1906 – 19 January 1958) was an Australian rules footballer who played with St Kilda in the Victorian Football League (VFL).
