= The Dodge =

American literary magazine

- Discipline: Literary journal
- Language: English
- Edited by: Katharine Beutner

Publication details
- History: 1979–2020 as Artful Dodge; 2021-present as The Dodge
- Publisher: College of Wooster (United States)
- Frequency: Quarterly

Standard abbreviations
- ISO 4: Dodge

Indexing
- ISSN: 0196-691X

Links
- Journal homepage

The Dodge is an American literary magazine based in Wooster, Ohio, at the College of Wooster. Founded by Daniel Bourne as Artful Dodge in 1979 and reborn as an online journal in 2021, The Dodge is a magazine of eco-writing, writing about animals, and works in translation. Recent authors published include Philip Metres, Rajiv Mohabir, and Sarah Blake.

== History ==
Founded by Daniel Bourne in 1979 in Bloomington, Indiana, the magazine progressed from a carbon copied pamphlet to a professionally produced literary magazine that won Bourne the Ohioana Library Association's Award for Editorial Excellence in 1992.

Receiving grants from Ohio Arts Council and relying on student editors to sift through the over 3,000 manuscripts received each year, the Artful Dodge published writers such as Czesław Miłosz, William S. Burroughs, Giannina Braschi, Charles Simic, Naomi Shihab Nye, and Ronald Wallace, and interviews with Jorge Luis Borges, Czesław Miłosz, W. S. Merwin, Nathalie Sarraute, Gwendolyn Brooks, William Least Heat-Moon, Michael Dorris, Tim O'Brien, and Stuart Dybek.
