= Bleury-Saint-Symphorien =

Commune in Eure-et-Loir, France

- Delegated commune of Auneau-Bleury-Saint-Symphorien
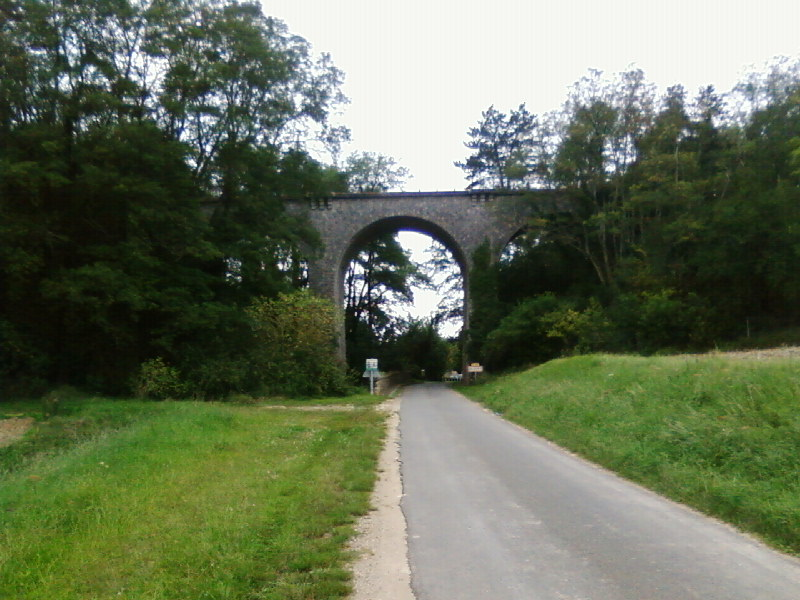
- Viaduct
- Location of Bleury-Saint-Symphorien
- Location within France Location within Centre-Val de Loire
- Coordinates: 48°31′14″N 1°44′54″E
- Country: France
- Region: Centre-Val de Loire
- Department: Eure-et-Loir
- Arrondissement: Chartres
- Canton: Auneau
- Commune: Auneau-Bleury-Saint-Symphorien
- Area^{1}: 17.24 km^{2} (6.66 sq mi)
- Highest elevation: 162 m (531 ft)
- Lowest elevation: 113 m (371 ft)
- Population (2022): 1,254
  - Density: 72.74/km^{2} (188.4/sq mi)
- Time zone: UTC+01:00 (CET)
  - Summer (DST): UTC+02:00 (CEST)
- Postal code: 28700
- ^{1} French Land Register data, which excludes lakes, ponds, glaciers > 1 km^{2} (0.386 sq mi or 247 acres) and river estuaries.

Bleury-Saint-Symphorien (French pronunciation: [blœʁi sɛ̃ sɛ̃fɔʁjɛ̃]) is a former commune in the Eure-et-Loir department in northern France. It was established on 1 January 2012 by merger of the former communes of Bleury and Saint-Symphorien-le-Château. On 1 January 2016, it was merged into the new commune of Auneau-Bleury-Saint-Symphorien, and became a commune déléguée within Auneau-Bleury-Saint-Symphorien.

== See also ==
- Communes of the Eure-et-Loir department
