= Doug Bourne =

Australian rules footballer, born 1908

Personal information
- Full name: Doug Bourne
- Born: 22 December 1908
- Died: 30 July 1980 (aged 71)
- Original team: Armadale
- Height: 168 cm (5 ft 6 in)
- Weight: 67 kg (148 lb)
- Position: Wing

Playing career^{1}
| Years | Club | Games (Goals) |
| 1930–35 | St Kilda | 48 (2) |
- ^{1} Playing statistics correct to the end of 1935.

Doug Bourne (22 December 1908 – 30 July 1980) was an Australian rules footballer who played with St Kilda in the Victorian Football League (VFL).
