= Heidi von Born =

Swedish writer and translator (1936–2018)

Heidi von Born (1936–2018) was a Swedish writer and translator. The author of numerous novels, her themes included difficult childhood, drawing on her eight years in a foster home in Sweden after her mother's death. She won numerous prizes, among them the Winter prize of the Samfundet De Nio.
