= Bourne SSSI, Avon =

Protected area in Somerset, England

Bourne
- Site of Special Scientific Interest
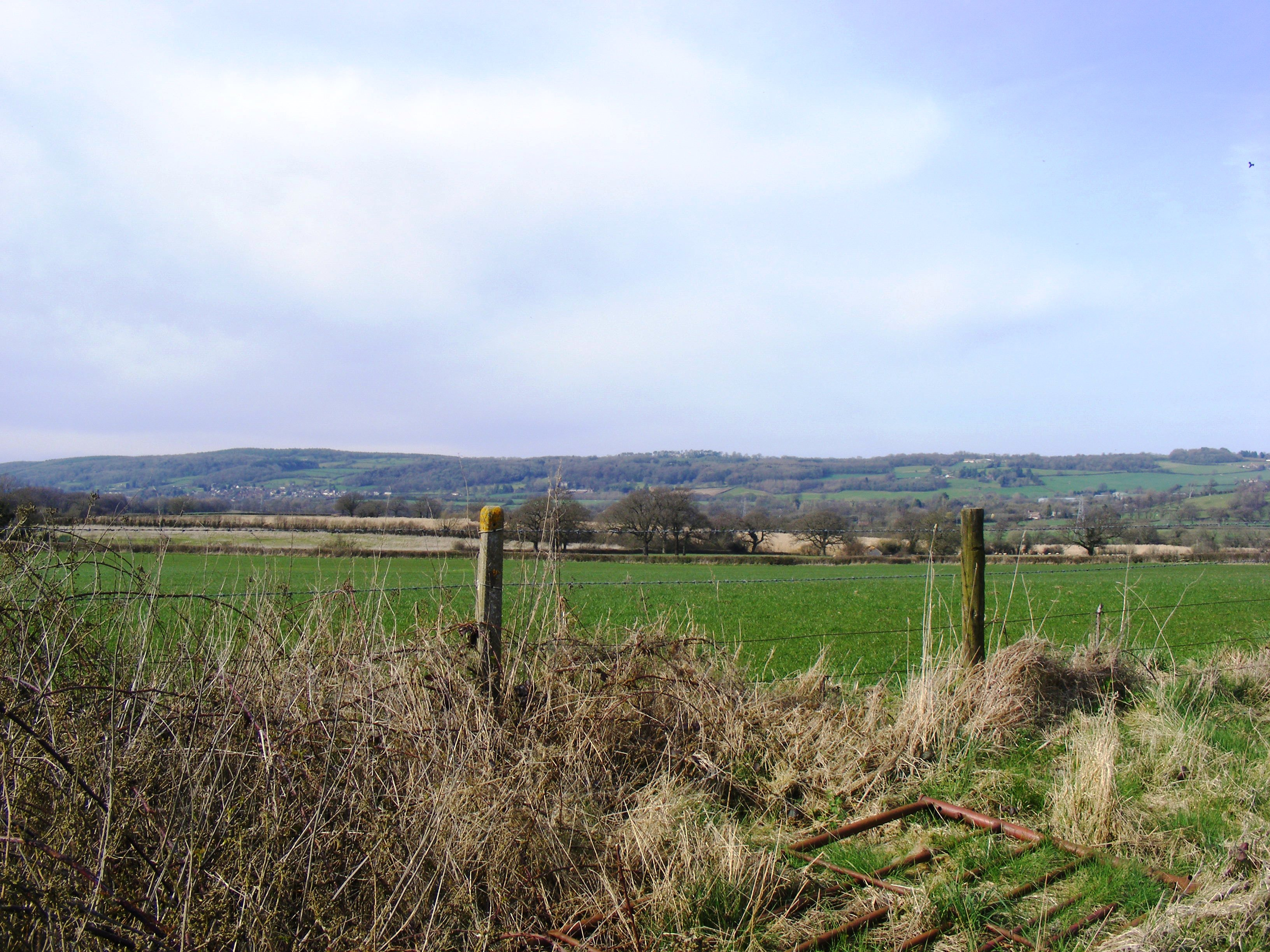

- Location within Somerset
- Location of Bourne.
- Area of search: Avon
- Grid reference: ST484600
- Coordinates: 51.33674°N 2.74210°W
- Interest: Geological
- Area: 20.93 acres (0.0847 km^{2}; 0.03270 sq mi)
- Notification date: 1992

Bourne SSSI, Avon (grid reference ST484600) is an 8.47 hectare geological Site of Special Scientific Interest near the village of Burrington, North Somerset, notified in 1992.

This site is of considerable importance because it has provided detailed information upon the composition of a north Mendip Pleistocene alluvial fan. An alluvial fan is a fan-shaped deposit formed where a fast flowing stream flattens, slows, and spreads typically at the exit of a canyon onto a flatter plain.

At Bourne sections have shown highly weathered gravels overlain by sandy silts and clay loams, the highest levels in the sequence showing evidence of cryoturbation. Two phases of fan sediment deposition were separated by a long period of subaerial weathering, which may represent an interglacial period.
