= Alfred Bourne (cricketer) =

English cricketer

Personal information
- Full name: Alfred Allinson Bourne
- Born: 16 April 1848; Atherstone, Warwickshire
- Died: 17 July 1931 (aged 83); Cheltenham, Gloucestershire
- Batting: Right handed
- Bowling: Slow left-arm orthodox

Domestic team information
- Years: Team
- 1870: Cambridge University
- Source: Cricinfo, 10 April 2017

Alfred Allinson Bourne (16 April 1848 – 17 July 1931) was an English cricketer. He played four first-class matches for Cambridge University Cricket Club in 1870.

Bourne had first shown promise as a slow left-arm orthodox bowler at Rugby School. Bourne took 28 wickets in his four first-class matches with best bowling figures of 7/65 against Marylebone Cricket Club. His last first-class appearance was the Varsity fixture known as 'Cobden's Match' where Frank Cobden took a hat-trick in the final over as Cambridge won by two runs. Bourne took an excellent catch to claim the first of these wickets.

Bourne studied at St John's College, Cambridge achieving a second-class in Classical Tripos. Following the end of his studies, he became mathematical master at Rossall School and in 1881 took the position of head at Oxford Military College. His final position was as mathematical master at Cheltenham College, where he worked for 18 years. During his academic career, Bourne wrote several mathematical school books in collaboration with Mr W. M. Baker. In later life, Bourne gained an interest in geophysics and was a fellow of the Royal Astronomical Society from November 1927.

== See also ==
- List of Cambridge University Cricket Club players
