= Liberty Road (France) =

Commemorative way marking the route of the Allied forces in 1944

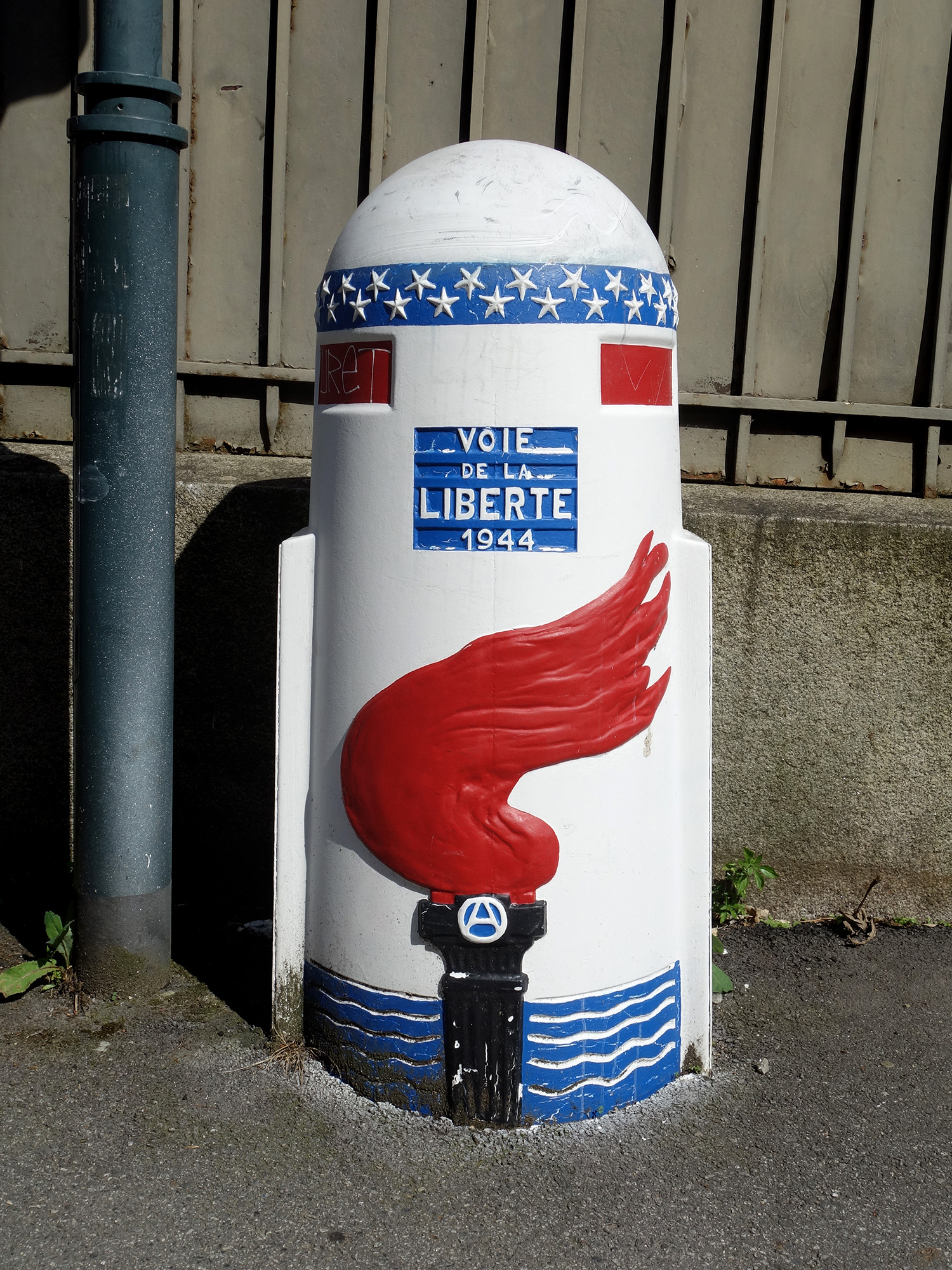
In 2003 this borne, located in the Boulevard Laënnec, Rennes, had recently been restored.

Liberty Road (French: La voie de la Liberté) is the commemorative way marking the route of the Allied forces from D-Day in June 1944. It starts in Sainte-Mère-Eglise, in the Manche département in Normandy, France, travels across Northern France to Metz and then northwards to end in Bastogne in Belgium, on the border of Luxembourg. At each of the 1,146 kilometres, there is a stone marker or borne. The first lies outside the town hall in Sainte-Mère-Église.

== History ==
Soon after the end of World War II, Guy de la Vasselais, mayor of Bleury-Saint-Symphorien, previously French liaison officer to George S. Patton, suggested the idea of erecting a monument to commemorate the Liberation of France by the American Armies: a monument that would symbolize the idea of Liberty. He proposed installation of a distinctive marker placed at each kilometre interval along the roads followed by General Patton's Third United States Army.

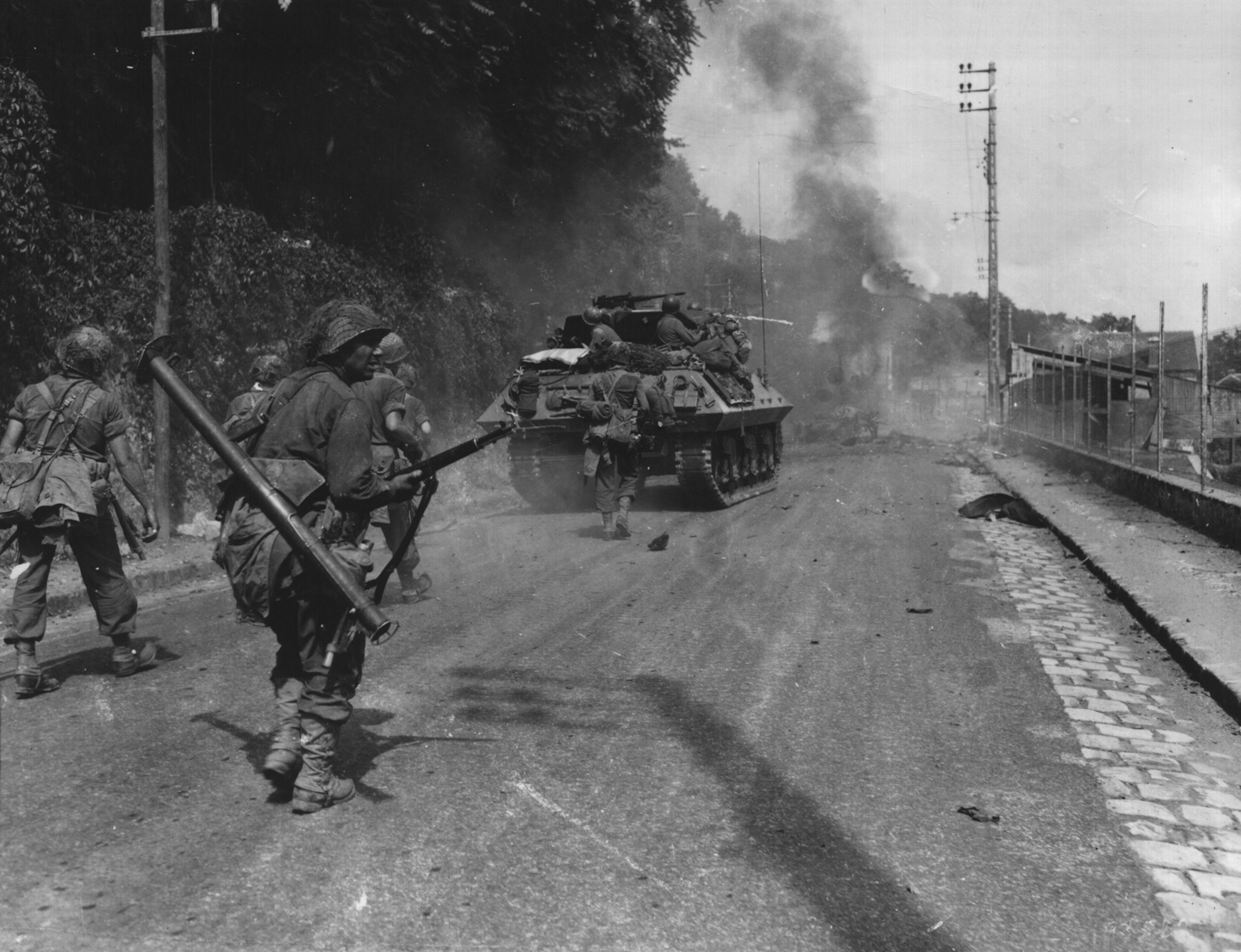
American troops near Fontainebleau

Beginning at Utah Beach in Normandy and ending at Bastogne in Belgium, the Liberty Road goes through the cities of Saint Malo, Rennes, Angers, Le Mans, Chartres, Fontainebleau, Reims, Verdun and Metz, and then through the Grand Duchy of Luxembourg. Altogether the Monument consists of 1146 bornes.

The sculptor, François Cogné, created the borne symbolic design. A flaming torch, reminiscent of the torch of the Statue of Liberty, emerging from the sea, is carried eastward. Along the circumference of the borne's dome-shaped top, the 48 stars representing the (then) 48 United States which took part in the Liberation of France.

Originally made of pink cement, each borne is approximately 1 metre (3 ft 3 in) high, but along major roads in France many original markers have been replaced with copies made of lighter materials, which are less dangerous in the event of a road accident. Some original models remain, notably in Champillon, Frisange, as well as all the markers along the N4 road in Belgium, from the Luxembourg border at Rosenberg to Bastogne.

The markers depict a flame , a symbol of liberty , rising from the waves, symbolizing the arrival of the liberating troops by sea. The flame is reminiscent of the torch of the Statue of Liberty in New York .

The “Liberty Highway” was officially opened on 17 September 1947 at Fontainebleau, by Paul Ramadier, then President du Conseil, in the presence of Jefferson Caffery, United States Ambassador to France and members of the American Legion. Many military and civilian dignitaries of the Allied Nations were also present at the ceremonies.

President Ronald Reagan, accompanied by many heads of State, visited the first borne in 1984 to mark the 40th anniversary of D-Day.

== Route ==
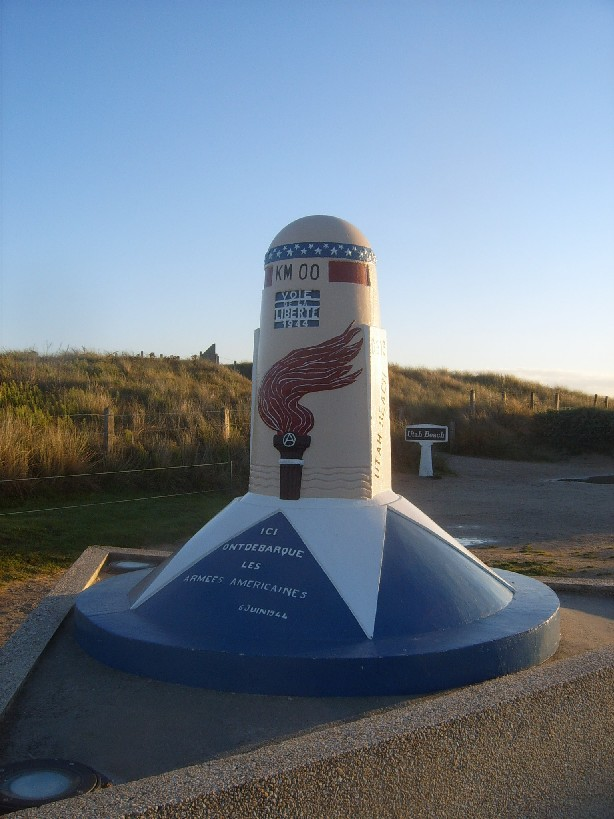
Borne number one, on the sands of Utah Beach.

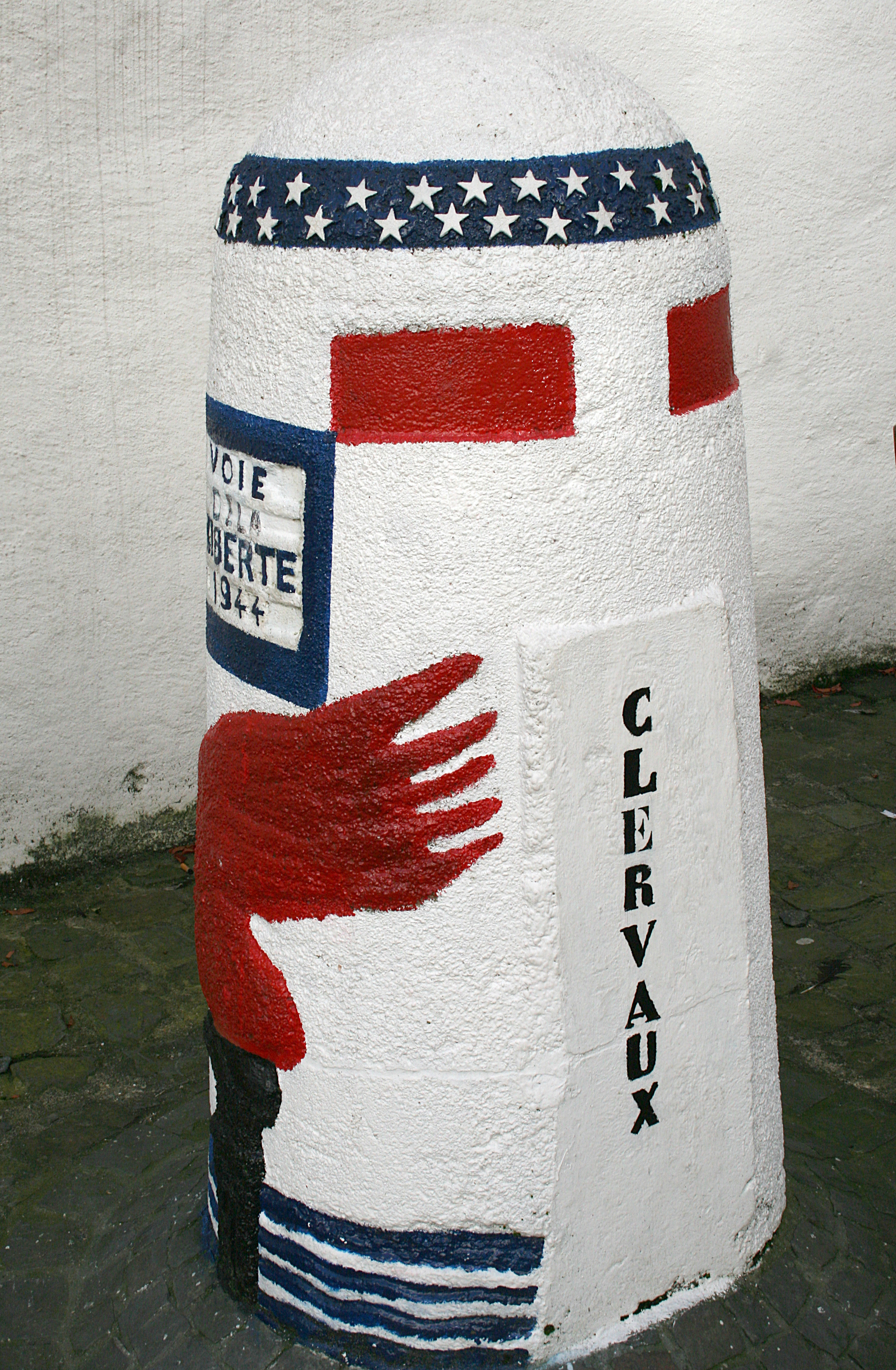
Borne of the Liberty Road in Clervaux.

These are the towns, villages and notable places along the route:

- Utah Beach
- Sainte-Mère-Eglise liberated by the U.S. paratroopers on 6 June 1944.
- Sainte-Marie-du-Mont, Manche is the town where the first German blockhouse was taken.
- Neuville-au-Plain was the first village liberated by the U.S. paratroopers.
- Montebourg liberated on 19 June 1944.
- Cherbourg liberated on 26 June 1944.
- Carentan liberated on 12 June 1944.
- Pont-Hébert liberated on 17 July 1944.
- Saint-Lô liberated on 16 July 1944. General Patton launched his offensive towards Avranches, towards Brittany and towards the Loire.
- Marigny liberated on 25 July 1944.
- Coutances liberated on 28 July 1944.
- Lengronne liberated on 29 July 1944, a scene of a violent tank battle.
- Avranches liberated on 30 July 1944, subjected to a German counter-attack. It is known as the Breach of Avranches.
- Saint-Servan liberated on 17 August 1944, where the Germans occupied the powerfully armed city fortress.
- Saint-Malo liberated on 16 August 1944, which was completely destroyed (especially the part within the walls).
- Rennes liberated on 4 August 1944.
- Angers liberated on 10 August 1944.
- Le Mans liberated on 8 August 1944.
- Chartres liberated on 18 August 1944.
- Bleury-Saint-Symphorien, almost midway between Sainte-Mère-Église and Bastogne, had the honour of receiving the first borne. On 25 August 1946, its mayor, Guy de la Vasselais was the proposer of Liberty Road.
- Étampes liberated on 22 August 1944.
- Fontainebleau liberated on 23 August 1944.
- Épernay liberated on 28 August 1944.
- Reims liberated on 30 August 1944. The Germans signed an unconditional surrender, at what is now Grand Quartier Général Eisenhower. The Salle de la Reddition is the precise location.
- Valmy liberated on 30 August 1944.
- Verdun, Meuse, became in October 1944, one of the two largest American supply depots.
- Gravelotte liberated on 13 December 1944.
- Nancy liberated on 15 September 1944.
- Rozérieulles liberated on 20 November 1944 and noted as among the most stubborn German resistance.
- Metz liberated on 19 November 1944.
- Thionville liberated on 12 September 1944.
- Luxembourg City liberated on 10 September 1944.
- Arlon liberated on 10 September 1944.
- Bastogne, the end of the Voie de la Liberté, 1,145 kilometres (711 mi) from Sainte-Mère-Église. It was liberated on 10 September 1944.

== Activities ==
A bicycle ride of the Voie de la Liberté has taken place every other year since 1986.
