= Una Mabel Bourne =

Australian pianist and composer

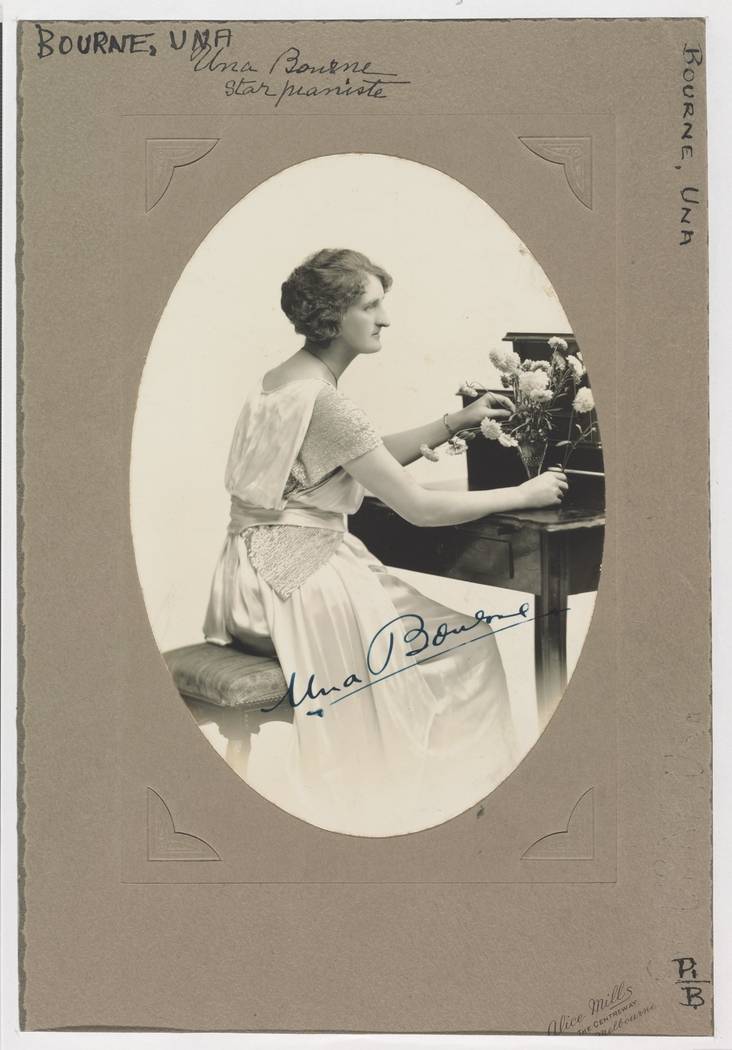
A 1922 photograph of Una Mabel Bourne, in the collection of the State Library of New South Wales

Una Mabel Bourne (23 October 1882 – 15 November 1974) was an Australian pianist and composer.

== Early life ==
Una Mabel Bourne was born at Mudgee, New South Wales, the daughter of James George Bourne and Margaret Webber Bourne. Her father was a shopkeeper. She was raised in Melbourne. Una Bourne's musical abilities were evident early in life; she performed on piano in professional venues before her teens. She studied with Benno Scherek in Australia, and in several European cities as a young woman.

== Career ==
"Miss Bourne has an excellent technique and plays with refinement and distinction," an English critic wrote of a performance at London's Bechstein Hall in 1906. Bourne joined Nellie Melba's touring entourage in Australia in 1907, 1909, and 1912, both as an accompanist and performing solo. After 1912, she moved to England, where she gave concerts and toured. She performed for Queen Mary in 1914, and during World War I she gave benefit concerts and concerts at hospitals.

In 1915 she began making recordings with the English Gramophone Company. She also made player-piano rolls in the United States, and gave performances for women's clubs and radio audiences. During World War II she was based in Melbourne again, where she performed and opened a conservatory.

Bourne's art songs and compositions for piano are considered "light and dainty", and include March Grotesque, Petite Valse Caprice, Gavotte, Humoresque, and Wiegenlied, which was dedicated to Nellie Melba.

== Personal life ==
Una Mabel Bourne lived for many years with her friend and colleague, soprano Mona McCaughey, who died in 1964. Bourne died ten years later, in 1974, aged 92 years. Some of her papers, including original compositions in manuscript, are archived in the State Library of Victoria. There is a scholarship named for Una Bourne at University of Melbourne.
