= Dickie Bourne =

English footballer

Personal information
- Full name: Richard Bourne
- Date of birth: 14 June 1878
- Place of birth: Manchester, England
- Date of death: 1957 (aged 78–79)
- Position: Winger

Senior career*
Years	Team	Apps	(Gls)
1899–1900	Roundel		
1900–1902	Sheffield United	8	(1)
1902–1903	Barnsley	19	(0)
1902–1905	Preston North End	62	(6)
1905–1907	Clapton Orient	56	(2)
1907–1908	West Bromwich Albion	9	(1)
1908	Walsall		
Total		154	(10)
- * Club domestic league appearances and goals

Richard Bourne (14 June 1878–1957) was an English footballer who played in the Football League for Barnsley, Clapton Orient, Preston North End, Sheffield United and West Bromwich Albion.
