= Borne, Bihar =

Village in Bihar, India

Borne
- Village
- Location within Bihar Location within India
- Coordinates: 25°31′40″N 86°42′31″E
- Country: India
- State: Bihar
- District: Khagaria
- Block: Chautham

Government
  - Type: Sarpanch

Area
  - Total: 33.29 km^{2} (12.85 sq mi)
- Elevation: 36 m (118 ft)

Population (2011)
  - Total: 34,026
  - Density: 1,022/km^{2} (2,647/sq mi)

Languages
  - Common: Angika, Hindi
- Time zone: UTC+5:30 (IST)
- PIN: 851201
- STD code: 06244
- Vehicle registration: BR-34

Borne is a village in the state of Bihar, India. It is located on the eastern part of Khagaria District, approximately 24 kilometres east of Khagaria, the seat of the district government. It had a population of 34,026 by 2011.

== Geography ==
Borne is situated in the western bank of the Kosi River, and is traversed by the National Highway 231. The village stretched over an area of 3329 hectares.

== Demographics ==
In the 2011 Census of India, the population of Borne was reported as 34,026. Among them, 18,022 were male and 16,004 were female. The working population accounted for 34.44% of the total population. The literacy rate stood at 47.96%, with 9,803 males and 6,515 females being literate.
