= Mike and Ike =

Brand of fruit-flavored candy

- Place of origin: Bethlehem, Pennsylvania, U.S. (1940; 86 years ago).
- Created by: Just Born, Inc/Just Dance LLC
- Variations: Tropical Typhoon, Berry Blast, Dirty Apple, etc
- Food energy (per 22g serving): 80 kcal (330 kJ)
Nutritional value
(per 22g serving)
- Protein: 0 g
- Fat: 0 g
- Carbohydrate: 20 g
- Other information: Kosher; gluten-free

Mike and Ike is an American brand of fruit-flavored candies that were first introduced in 1940 by American company Just Born. Despite conjecture, the origin of the candy's name remains unknown.

== History ==
Mike and Ike was created by the Bethlehem, Pennsylvania-based candy company Just Born in 1940. When Just Born acquired the Rodda Candy Company in 1953, Rodda's expertise in jelly beans helped Just Born produce new Mike and Ike flavors, such as cotton candy. Additional flavors, such as root beer, came in the 1960s, and others have been introduced on and off since.

The origin of the Mike and Ike name is obscure, even to the company. Just Born has claimed it originated from a vaudeville song, an internal naming contest, or the names of the inventors. People have also claimed that the name is from the Rube Goldberg comic strip Mike and Ike (They Look Alike); Dwight D. Eisenhower, whose nickname was Ike; or the Matina Brothers, two of whom were nicknamed "Mike" and "Ike," and were billed as circus dwarves and appeared as Munchkins in the 1939 film The Wizard of Oz.

== Candy ==
Mike and Ike are oblong fruit-flavored chewy candies that come in several colors and varieties, including cherry, strawberry, orange, lemon, and lime. Popular varieties are Tropical Typhoon, Berry Blast and Jolly Joes. Each candy has 7 calories, 0 grams of fat, and ~ 1 gram of sugar. The candy is kosher and gluten-free.

They are similar to Hot Tamales, another candy introduced by the same manufacturer in 1950, though they are not spicy.

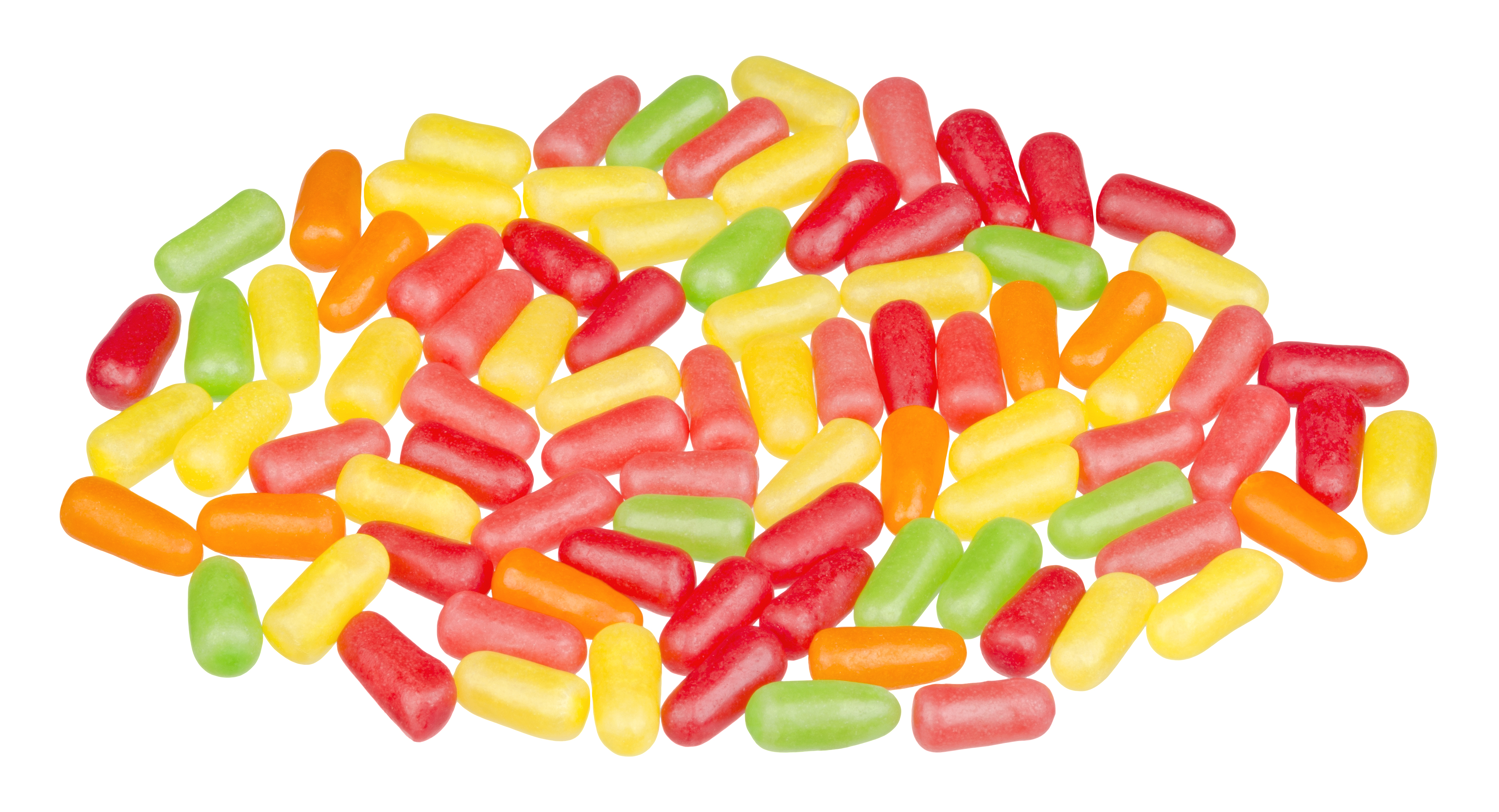
Mike and Ike candies

== Varieties ==
Just Born produces several varieties of Mike and Ikes, including:

Name	Package color	First available	Package type
Original Fruits	Green	1940	Box, bag, or freezer pop
Berry Blast	Blue	1987	Box or bag
Tropical Typhoon	Pink	1977	Box or bag
Italian Ice (discontinued)	Light blue	2008	Box or bag
Lemonade Blends (discontinued)	Yellow	2007	Box or bag
Jolly Joes	Purple	1973	Box
Sour Fruits (discontinued and replaced by Mega Mix Sours)	Yellow	1999	Box or bag
Red Rageous	Red	2009	Box or bag
Strawberry Reunion (discontinued)	Black and pink	2013	Box
Sweet Paradise (discontinued)	Light Purple	2014	Box
Mega Mix	Light Blue with rainbow	2016	Box or bag
Mega Mix Sour	Light Green with rainbow	2018	Box or bag
Sour Watermelon	Light Pink	2023	Box
Sour Blue Raspberry	Light Blue	2024	Box

Flavors for Mike and Ike

Retro/limited varieties include:

- Lem and Mel (Lemon and watermelon) flavor (launched 1991; reissued 2013)
- Cherri and Bubb (Cherry and bubble gum) flavor (launched 1989; reissued 2013, then again in 2019)
- Strawbana (launched 1991) (discontinued)
- Tangy Twister (possibly Orange, but cannot be found in stores or online)
- Mike and Ike – Strawberries n' Cream (launched 2000; reissued 2019)
- Mike and Ike – Orange n' Cream (launched 2000)
- Cherry Cola (launched 2004, reissued 2016)
- Buttered Popcorn (launched 2004, reissued 2016)
- Sour Lemon
- Mike and Ike Minion Mix – Blueberry and Banana flavors (launched 2014)
- Mike and Ike Valentines Mix (Seasonal)
- Mike and Ike Mummy's Mix (Seasonal)
- Mike and Ike Merry Mix (Seasonal) (launched 2015)
- Mike and Ike Sundae Sweets (Limited edition) (launched 2017)
- Mike and Ike Cotton Candy (Limited edition) (reissued 2015, then again in 2021 and 2025)
- Mike and Ike Root Beer Float (Limited edition) (reissued 2015, then again in 2021 and 2025)
- Mike and Ike Ice Cream Truck Mix (Limited edition) (launched 2026)
- Mike and Ike Thrill Ride Mix (Limited edition) (launched 2026)

There are also seasonal packages for Easter in which the Mike and Ike flavors are formed as jelly beans.

== Media ==
In April 2012, the company ran an ad campaign based on the premise that Mike and Ike were "breaking up" due to "creative differences"; the packaging showed one or the other name scratched out. The campaign was intended to capture the interest of younger consumers. In 2013 the company announced Mike and Ike would reunite. In addition to a re-designed packaging and juicier tasting candy, a trailer for a movie was released, entitled, The Return of Mike and Ike.
