= William Bourne =

William Bourne may refer to:

== Politicians ==
- William Bourne (MP of Bedford) (by 1499–1545), MP for Bedford
- William Bourne of Derby, MP for Derby in 1297

== Others ==
- William Bourne (mathematician) (1535–1582), English mathematician
- William Bourne (19th century businessman), see Denby Pottery Company
- William Oland Bourne (1819–1901) American clergyman, journalist, social reformer
- Bill Bourne (cricketer) (born 1952), Barbadian cricketer
- Bill Bourne (1954–2022), Canadian musician and songwriter
