= 2017 Luxembourg communal elections =

The 2017 Luxembourg communal elections were held on 8 October to elect the communal councils of the 102 municipalities of Luxembourg.

== Electoral system ==
Luxembourg citizens aged over 18 and living in the country were able to vote. Citizens from any EU country could vote if they were registered on the electoral list, the requirements for which were to have lived in Luxembourg for at least 5 years and to be living in Luxembourg during the election. Citizens from any other country could vote subject to the same requirements as for EU citizens, plus the requirement of holding valid visa or residence permit.

The number of seats in each communal council was determined by the population of the commune. The population-seat ratio on each communal council was established on the following scale:

Population	Seats
<999	7
1,000–2,999	9
3,000–5,999	11
6,000–9,999	13
10,000–14,999	15
15,000–19,999	17
>20,000	19
Luxembourg City	27

Plurality-at-large voting was used in municipalities with a population of under 2,999 inhabitants. In municipalities with a population of over 3,000 inhabitants, proportional representation with open lists was used. Voters could vote for a party list or cast multiple votes for as many candidates as there are seats. Seat allocation was calculated in accordance with the Hagenbach-Bischoff quota. On 1 January 2018, 6 municipalities will be merged and 3 new municipalities will be created as a result. The councillors will be elected in different constituencies, which correspond to the old boundaries.

== Candidates ==
There were a total of 3,575 candidates. The total number of councillors elected with proportional representation was 600, corresponding to 45 municipalities plus the section of Hobscheid (future municipality of Habscht).

The different political parties ran in the following number of municipalities:

- CSV: 46
- DP: 43
- LSAP: 41
- Greens: 34
- ADR: 9
- The Left: 9
- Pirate Party: 5
- KPL: 5
- Others: 9

== Results ==
=== Municipalities using proportional representation ===
Party	Votes	%	Seats	+/–
Christian Social People's Party	769,109	30.44	209	+47
Luxembourg Socialist Workers' Party	606,525	24.01	155	–10
Democratic Party	458,811	18.16	108	+2
The Greens	413,093	16.35	77	+3
The Left	102,347	4.05	8	+1
Alternative Democratic Reform Party	65,687	2.60	4	0
Pirate Party Luxembourg	33,556	1.33	3	New
Communist Party of Luxembourg	25,055	0.99	2	–1
Others	52,360	2.07	34	+11
Total	2,526,543	100.00	600	+56
Source: Gouvernement du Grand-Duché de Luxembourg

=== Municipalities using majoritarian system ===
Party	Seats
Independents	522
Total	522

=== Detailed results ===
Commune	CSV	LSAP	DP	dei gréng	dei Lénk	ADR	Piraten	KPL	Others	Total
Bertrange	3	1	7	2	–	–	–	–	–	13
Bettembourg	5	6	1	2	–	1	–	–	–	15
Betzdorf	3	3	2	3	–	–	–	–	–	11
Bissen	6	–	–	–	–	–	–	–	5	11
Clervaux	6	–	2	2	–	0	0	–	1	11
Contern	5	2	2	2	–	–	–	–	–	11
Diekirch	4	7	1	1	–	–	–	–	–	13
Differdange	4	4	2	7	1	0	–	1	–	19
Dippach	2	5	2	–	–	–	–	–	2	11
Dudelange	5	10	–	2	1	1	–	–	–	19
Echternach	3	3	2	3	–	–	–	–	–	11
Esch-sur-Alzette	6	6	2	3	2	0	0	0	–	19
Ettelbruck	5	4	2	2	–	–	–	–	–	13
Frisange	3	2	1	–	–	–	–	–	5	11
Grevenmacher	5	2	3	1	–	–	–	–	–	11
Habscht-Hobscheid	8	1	2	–	–	–	–	–	–	11
Hesperange	8	1	3	3	0	–	–	–	–	15
Junglinster	5	2	4	2	–	–	–	–	–	13
Käerjeng	7	5	1	2	–	0	–	–	–	15
Kayl	4	5	2	2	–	–	–	–	–	13
Kehlen	5	3	1	2	–	–	0	–	–	11
Kopstal	4	–	3	–	–	–	–	–	4	11
Lorentzweiler	2	–	1	2	–	–	–	–	6	11
Luxembourg City	7	3	9	5	2	1	0	0	–	27
Mamer	6	3	1	3	–	–	–	–	–	13
Mersch	4	1	5	3	–	–	–	–	–	13
Mertert	3	6	2	–	–	–	–	–	–	11
Mondercange	5	5	2	1	–	–	–	–	–	13
Mondorf-les-Bains	3	1	6	1	–	–	–	–	–	11
Niederanven	6	3	2	2	–	–	–	–	–	13
Pétange	8	4	1	2	0	0	2	–	0	17
Rambrouch	6	3	2	–	–	–	–	–	–	11
Remich	3	1	4	2	–	–	1	–	–	11
Roeser	3	6	2	2	–	–	–	–	–	13
Rumelange	4	5	1	–	–	–	–	1	–	11
Sandweiler	4	2	2	3	–	–	–	–	–	11
Sanem	5	7	1	2	2	0	–	0	–	17
Schifflange	6	6	1	2	–	–	–	–	–	15
Schuttrange	1	1	4	1	–	–	–	–	4	11
Steinfort	4	5	1	1	–	–	–	–	–	11
Steinsel	2	5	4	–	–	–	–	–	–	11
Strassen	3	4	4	2	0	–	–	–	–	13
Troisvierges	4	–	–	–	–	–	–	–	7	11
Walferdange	5	2	4	2	–	–	–	–	–	13
Wiltz	5	6	2	–	–	–	–	–	–	13
Wincrange	4	4	2	–	–	1	–	–	–	11
Total	209	155	108	77	8	4	3	2	34	600
