= Septfontaines =

Septfontaines Simmer
- Coat of arms

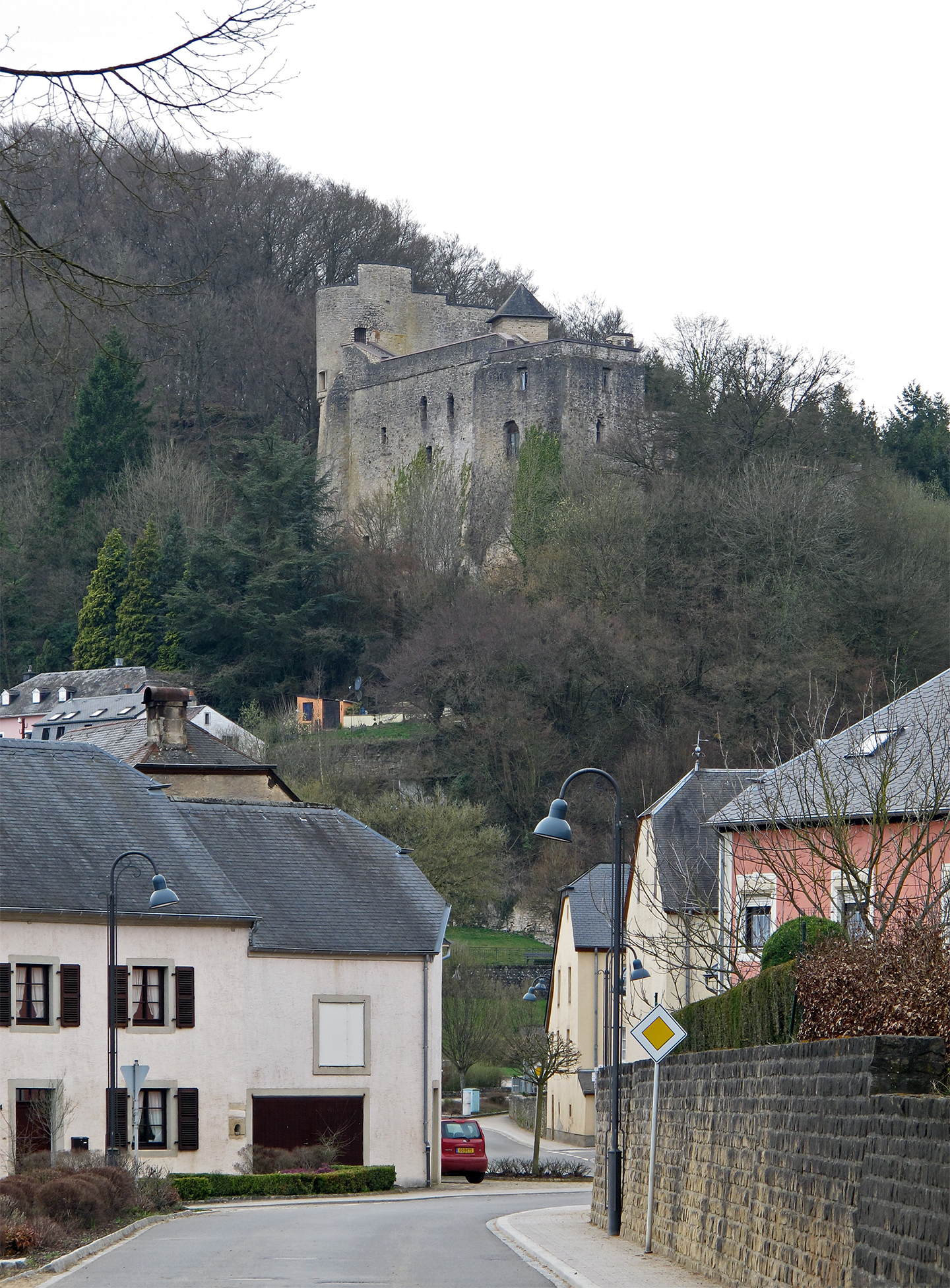
- Country: Luxembourg
- Canton: Capellen
- Commune: Habscht

Government
  - Mayor: Serge Hoffmann

Population (2024)
  - Total: 378
- Website: septfontaines.lu

Septfontaines (French pronunciation: [sɛtfɔ̃tɛn]; Luxembourgish: Simmer; German: Simmern [ˈzɪmɐn]) is a small town in western Luxembourg. It is part of the commune of Habscht, in the canton of Capellen. It had a population of 412 as of September 2026.

Septfontaines Castle is one of the castles belonging to the Valley of the Seven Castles. Located high above the town of Septfontaines, the medieval castle is now privately owned.

Septfontaines was the administrative centre of a commune by the same name until 2018, when it was merged with the commune of Hobscheid to form the commune of Habscht.

== Former commune ==
The former commune consisted of the villages:

- Greisch
- Roodt-sur-Eisch
- Septfontaines
- Simmerfarm
- Simmerschmelz
- Leesbach

== Name ==
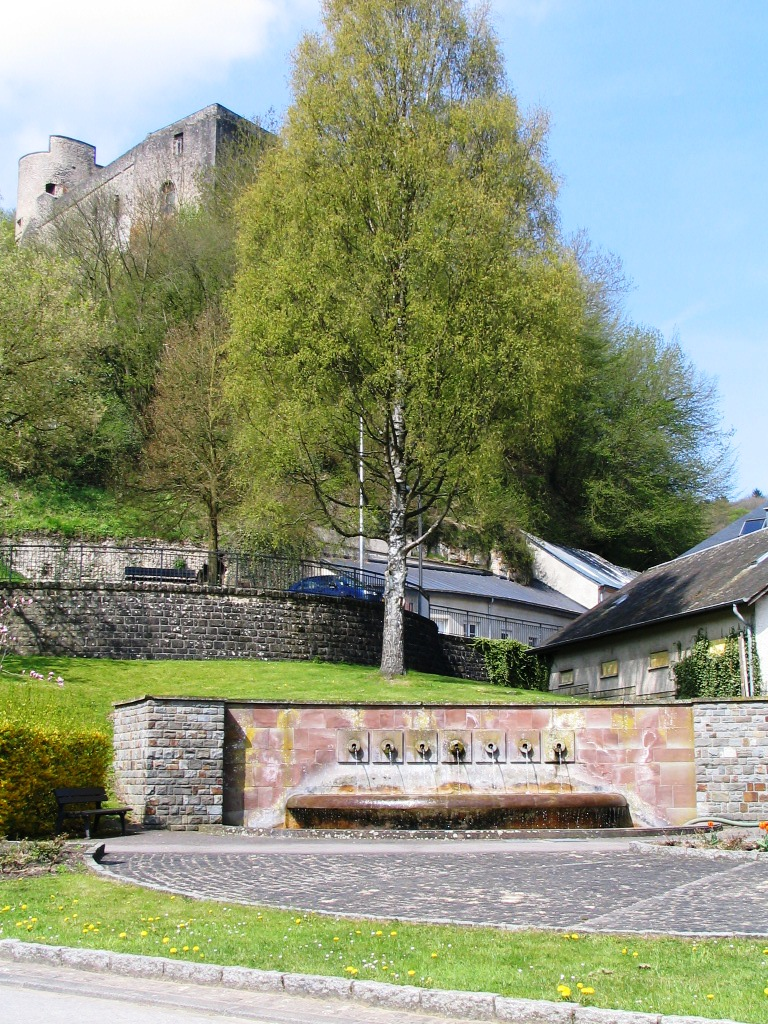
Siewebueren Fountain and castle in Septfontaines

The name Septfontaines is a French neologism (the local population is almost entirely Luxembourgish-speaking), derived from the older name Siebenborn (literally, 'seven springs'), which appears as the name of the town in Latin and German documents from the nineteenth century and earlier. This name is also seen in Siewebueren, the name of the town's fountain. The name Siebenborn was often abbreviated 7born in vital records.
