= Goetzingen =

Human settlement in Luxembourg

- Commune
- Entering Goetzingen from the south west

- Location within Luxembourg
- Coordinates: 49°40′N 5°59′E
- Country: Luxembourg
- Canton: Koerich
- Time zone: UTC+1 (CET)
  - Summer (DST): UTC+2 (CEST)

Goetzingen (Luxembourgish: Gëtzen; German: Götzingen) is a village in the commune of Koerich, in western Luxembourg. As of September 2026, the town had a population of 605.

Once an agricultural community, Goetzingen is now almost entirely residential. Owing to its proximity to Capellen and the A6 motorway or European route E25 to Luxembourg City and Brussels, it is increasingly popular for those working in the surrounding area. Goetzingen forms an extended cross along the CR 109 from Koerich to Capellen and the road from Windhof to Nospelt.
