= Heinrich Johann Nepomuk von Crantz =

Luxembourgish botanist (1722–1797)

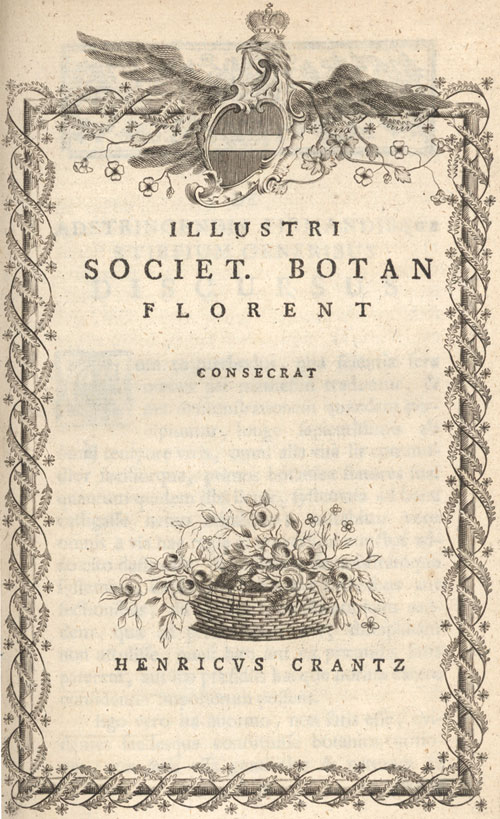
- Classis cruciformium emendata cum figuris aeneis in necessarium instit. rei herbariae supplementum (1769)
- Born: 25 November 1722; Roodt-sur-Eisch, Duchy of Luxembourg
- Died: 18 January 1799 (aged 76); Judenburg, Austria
- Education: University of Vienna
- Spouses: Anna Susanne Petrasch; Magda Lena de Tremon
- Scientific career
- Fields: Botany, medicine
- Workplaces: St. Mary's Hospital, Vienna; University of Vienna

Heinrich Johann Nepomuk von Crantz (Roodt-sur-Eisch, Luxembourg, 25 November 1722 – 18 January 1799, Judenburg, Austria) was a botanist and a physician.

In 1750 he obtained his doctorate of medicine in Vienna, where he was a pupil of Gerard van Swieten (1700–1772). He studied obstetrics in Paris and London. In Paris he was influenced by André Levret (1703–1780) and Nicolas Puzos (1686–1753).

He was first married to Anna Susanne Petrasch and then to Magda Lena de Tremon. He had two sons and one daughter.

He became a lecturer in obstetrics at St. Mary's Hospital in Vienna in 1754. From 1756 to 1774, he taught physiology and materia medica at the university in that city.

He was the author of:

- Einleitung in eine wahre und gegründete Hebammenkunst (1756).
- Commentarius de rupto in partus doloribus a foetu utero (1756).
- Commentatio de instrumentorum in arte obstetricia historia utilitate et recta ac praepostera applicatione (1757).
- De systemate irritabilitatis (1761).
- Materia medica et chirurgica (three volumes, 1762) (Vol. 1 - 3 1765 Digital edition by the University and State Library Düsseldorf)
- De aquis medicatis principatus Transsylvaniae (1773).
- Die Gesundbrunnen der Österreichischen Monarchie (1777).

He recommended better methods of hygiene for midwives. In addition to his work in medicine, he studied chemistry, botany, and the sources of mineral water. The plant genus Crantzia (Gesneriaceae) was named for him by Thomas Nuttall.
