= Grisch =

Grisch or Greisch means gray in Romansch language, and may refer to:

- Crap Grisch, a mountain in Switzerland
- Piz Grisch, a mountain in Switzerland
- Piz Grisch (Albula Alps), a mountain in Switzerland
- Greisch, a village in Luxembourg
- Pol Greisch (1930–2026), dramatist, writer and actor from Luxembourg
