= Goeblange =

Coordinates: 49°40′N 5°58′E

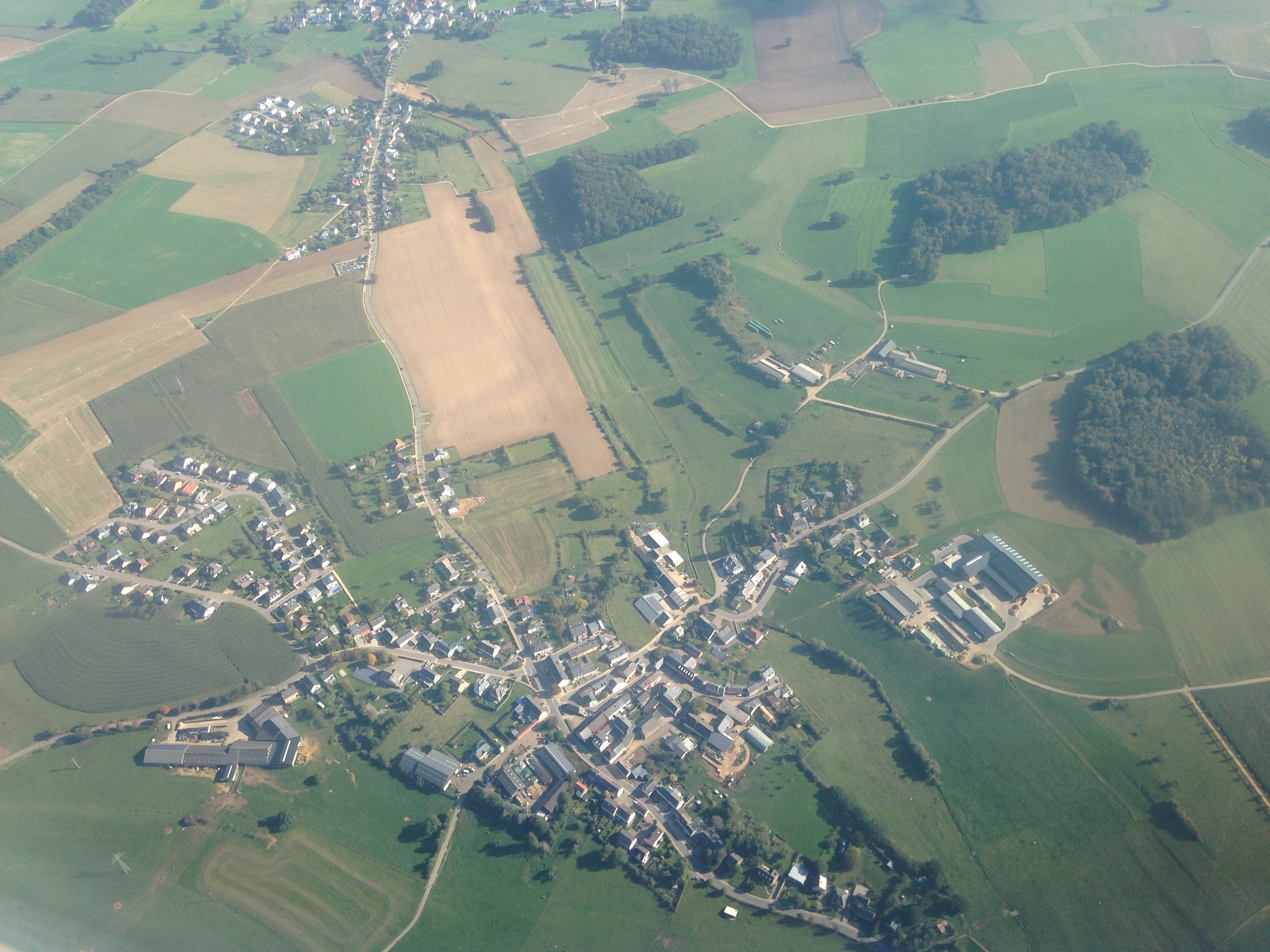
Aerial view of Goeblange (Giewel)

Goeblange (Luxembourgish: Giewel, German: Göblingen) is a town in the commune of Koerich, in southern Luxembourg about 13 km west of Luxembourg City. As of September 2026, the town had a population of 682.

== Location ==
Goeblange lies 321 metres (1,053 ft) above sea level on the CR 109 from Koerich to Capellen at the crossroads with the road from Septfontaines to Windhof. Once a farming community, it is now increasingly becoming a residential area adjacent to Koerich.

== History ==
=== Gallo-Roman ruins ===
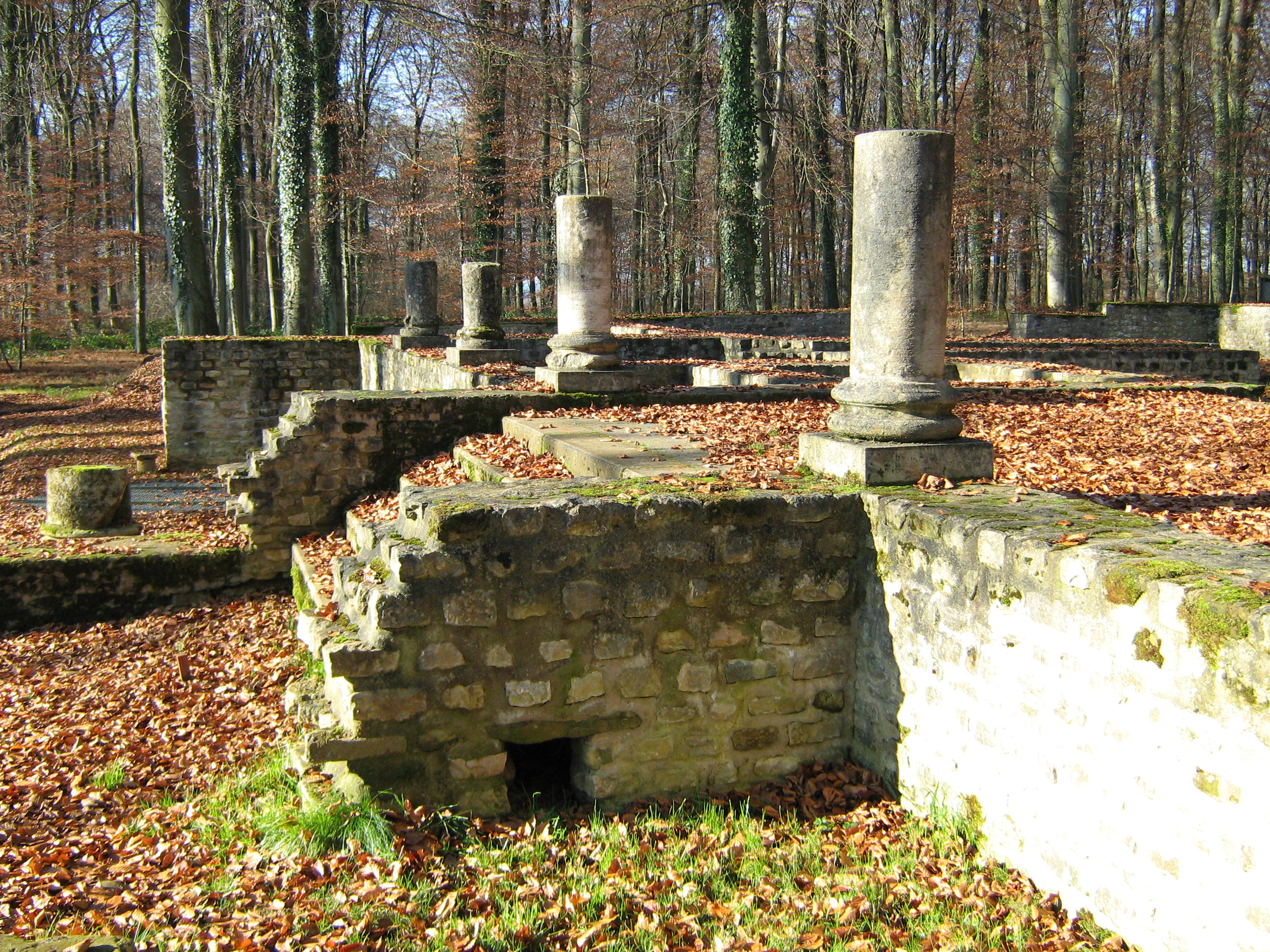
Goeblange: Ruins of the Roman Villa Rustica

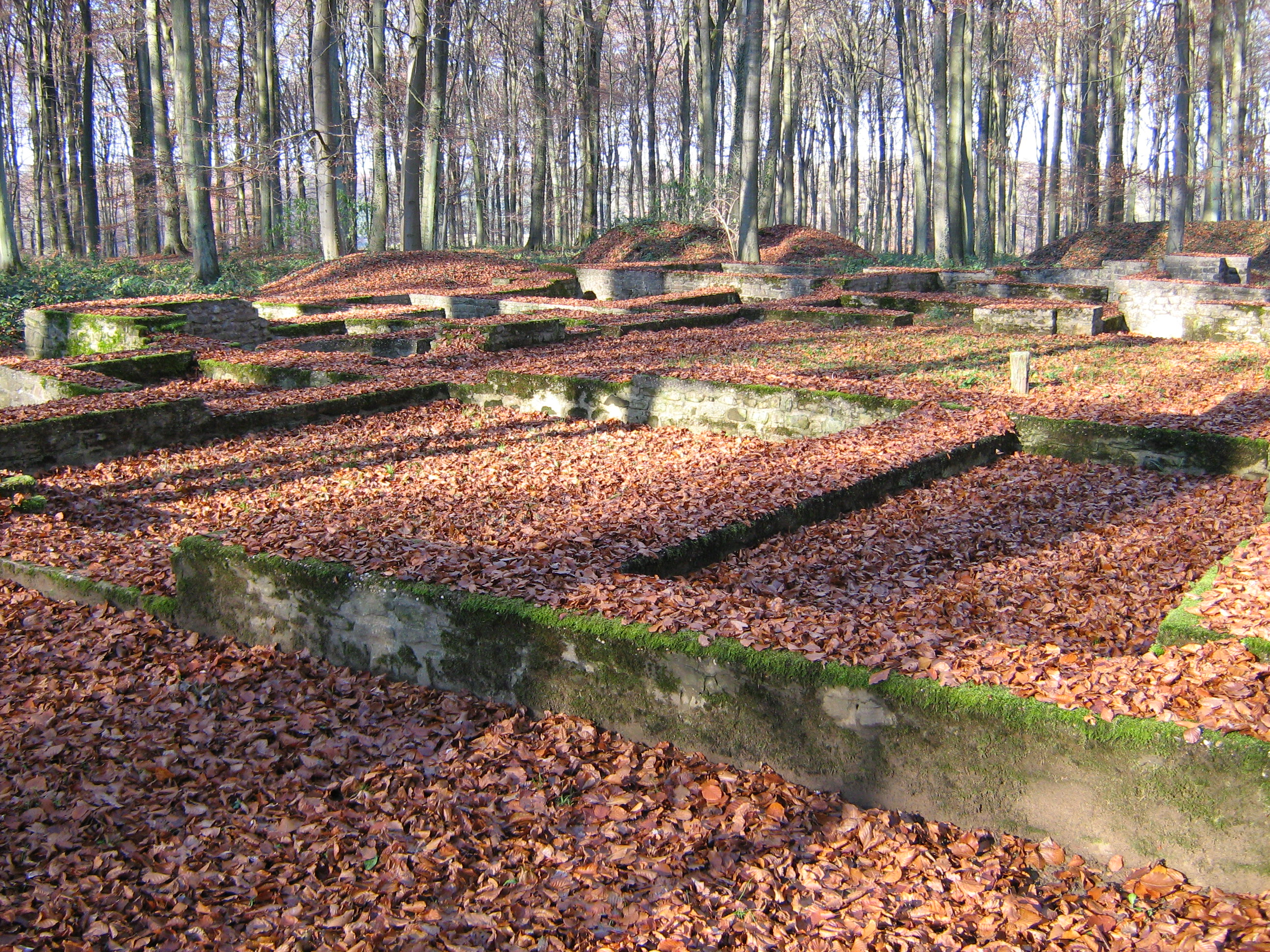
Goeblange: The second Miecher building

In the Miecher forest, about 1 kilometre (0.62 mi) north-east of the village, extensive remains of a Roman farming community have been found. Two large villas have been excavated and the foundations partially rebuilt. There are other buildings and fortifications on the site which are now being unearthed.

Information boards at the site explain that the villas probably date back to the 1st century but were extensively developed in the 4th century. Roman civilization was then thriving in the area owing to the prosperity of the imperial city of Trier.

The Villa Miecher, a villa rustica covering some 700 square metres (7,500 sq ft) and designated Building I, stands on elevated ground overlooking the land to the south. The cellar built in the 1st century was later converted into a cistern for water supply. There is also evidence of water purification systems. By the 4th century, the south facade with its large porch, its two lateral towers and its central door must have made the villa an impressive sight.

The second building, in the north-west corner of the settlement was constructed in the 1st century but was considerably modified during the 2nd and 3rd centuries. The room in the north-west corner was converted into a caldarium for heated baths. The other rooms were probably used to house the servants. The building was abandoned in the 4th century and fell to ruin.

The Roman road from Trier to Arlon and Reims passes through nearby Capellen. Produce from the Miecher settlement could therefore have been transported along this road.

=== Celtic tombs ===
In 1993, the National Museum of History and Art excavated Celtic tombs dating back to 50 BC to 30 BC which had been discovered in 1966 about 500 metres (1,600 ft) northeast of the Roman ruins in an area known as Scheierheck. The tombs were no doubt the resting place of aristocrats - four men and one woman - judging from the artifacts which were found there. These included: 1 amphoric wine flagon, 4 bottles, 7 plates, 5 pots, 7 bowls, 5 cups, 1 flat plate, 1 goblet, 1 drinking horn, 1 iron knife, 2 lance blades, 2 spurs, 3 bronze broches, 1 pair of scissors and the remains of cremation, including those of a wild boar.
