= St Hubert's Church =

St Hubert's Church may refer to:

- St Hubert's Church, Bridel, Luxembourg
- St Hubert's Church, Corfe Mullen, Dorset, United Kingdom
- St Huberts Chapel, Rowland's Castle, Hampshire, United Kingdom
- Church of St. Hubert the Hunter and Library, Bondurant, Wyoming, United States

== See also ==
- Church of Our Lady and St Hubert, Warley, West Midlands, United Kingdom
- Church of St. Hubertus, Chanhassen, Minnesota, United States
