= Société préhistorique luxembourgeoise =

The Société préhistorique luxembourgeoise (S.P.L.) syndicates people interested in the Prehistory and Protohistory of the Grand-Duchy of Luxembourg. The association currently counts 199 members (2013), of which 34 are from abroad, and is located in the town of Waldbillig.

The S.P.L. was founded on June 11, 1979 in Luxembourg-City. The founding members were: Germaine Geiben-Bianchy (Diekirch), Joseph Herr (Diekirch), Marcel Lamesch (Luxembourg-City), Jean Joseph (John. J.) Muller (Luxembourg-City), Liette Muller-Schneider (Luxembourg-City), Fernand Spier (Luxembourg-City), Norbert Theis (Esch-sur-Alzette), Édouard Thibold (Echternach), Georges Thill (Gonnerange), Raymond Waringo (Bettembourg) a Pierre Ziesaire (Bridel). Fernand Spier became president, Pierre Ziesaire vice-president, John. J. Muller secretary and Georges Thill treasurer of the association.

At first, the association was located in Luxembourg-City and in 2007 was transferred to Waldbillig.

Since 1979, the S.P.L. publishes a scientific journal, the Bulletin de la Société préhistorique luxembourgeoise, containing mainly papers about prehistoric research in Luxembourg, but also from abroad. The 34th publication will be printed in 2013.
The association organises regular conferences, colloquiums and guided tours, exhibitions as well as field trips.

== Literatur ==
- Spier, F., 2009. Les 30 ans de la Société Préhistorique Luxembourgeoise: un aperçu historique, 1979-2009. Bulletin de la Société préhistorique luxembourgeoise 29 (2007), p. 9-40.
- Muller-Schneider, J.J., 2009. Les activités de la Société Préhistorique Luxembourgeoise au fil des années. Bulletin de la Société préhistorique luxembourgeoise 29 (2007), p. 41-55.
- Muller-Schneider, J.J., 2009. L'acte constitutif de la Société Préhistorique Luxembourgeoise: les statuts. Bulletin de la Société préhistorique luxembourgeoise 29 (2007), p. 77-79.
