= Olm (disambiguation) =

The olm (Proteus anguinus) is a species of amphibian.

Olm may also refer to:

- Ocular larva migrans, an eye disease
- Oil life monitor
- Olm (encryption protocol)
- Olm, Luxembourg
- OLM (studio), formerly Oriental Light and Magic, a Japanese animation studio
- Hans Werner Olm, German comedy artist
- The Olms, a musical group made up of Pete Yorn and J.D. King
- Olympia Regional Airport (IATA code)
- Ordre Libanais Maronite, the Lebanese Maronite Order, religious order
- Ordo Lectionum Missae, a Roman Catholic liturgical lectionary
