= Nospelt =

Human settlement in Luxembourg

Coordinates: 49°41′N 6°01′E

Nospelt: Centre of the village

Nospelt (Luxembourgish: Nouspelt) is a village in the commune of Kehlen, in south-western Luxembourg. As of September 2026, the village had a population of 1,375. It is known above all for its potters who were particularly successful during the 19th century.

== Location ==
Nospelt lies 15 km north west of Luxembourg City at a height of 320 m on a plateau between the Mamer and Eisch rivers. It is a quiet rural village with pleasant houses and streets.

Nospelt's pottery museum

== History ==
With the recent discovery of Celtic tombs in the area, it appears that the history of Nospelt stretches back until before the Roman conquest. The finds at Scheierheck near neighbouring Goeblange and at Kreckelbierg, just north-west of the village of Nospelt, contain a range of articles including wine flagons, articles of pottery, spurs, knives, lances and a lantern testifying to the nobility of those buried. It is thought the tombs might belong to chieftains from the Titelberg settlement near Pétange. Some of the artefacts including a tall amphora came from as far away as the Mediterranean, showing the extent of trade with other regions at the time.

Merovingian tombs from the 7th century have been found at Telpescholtz between Nospelt and Dondelange. The area thus seems to have been inhabited over the centuries without interruption.

The origins of Nospelt's pottery production go back to 1458. By the early 19th century, there were 17 different potters shops in the village. Nospelt was recognized as the centre of Luxembourg's ceramics industry until 1914 when Nicolas Schneider (1868-1941), after whom a street is named, lit his kiln for the last time. Today a museum in his old workshop commemorates the history of the art with exhibits from Echternach and elsewhere in Luxembourg. There is also a road called "rue des potiers", "Potters' Road".

Nospelt church

== The church ==
Today's church stands on the site of the former chapel, dedicated to St Thomas, of which the oldest record dates back to 1685. The new church, completed in 1852, was built in the Empire style with rounded windows and a bell tower above the porch. The 17th century pietà on the altar comes from the original chapel. Renovation work was carried out in 1986.

== Emaischen festival ==
Every year on Easter Monday, Nospelt celebrates its former potteries with an open-air Emaischen festival where amateur potters demonstrate their art and wares. A special attraction is the Peckvillercher, a bird-shaped whistle associated with pottery manufacture in various parts of Europe. According to tradition, every child received a whistle from his parents on Easter Monday each year.
