= Koerich =

Koerich Käerch (Luxembourgish)
- Commune
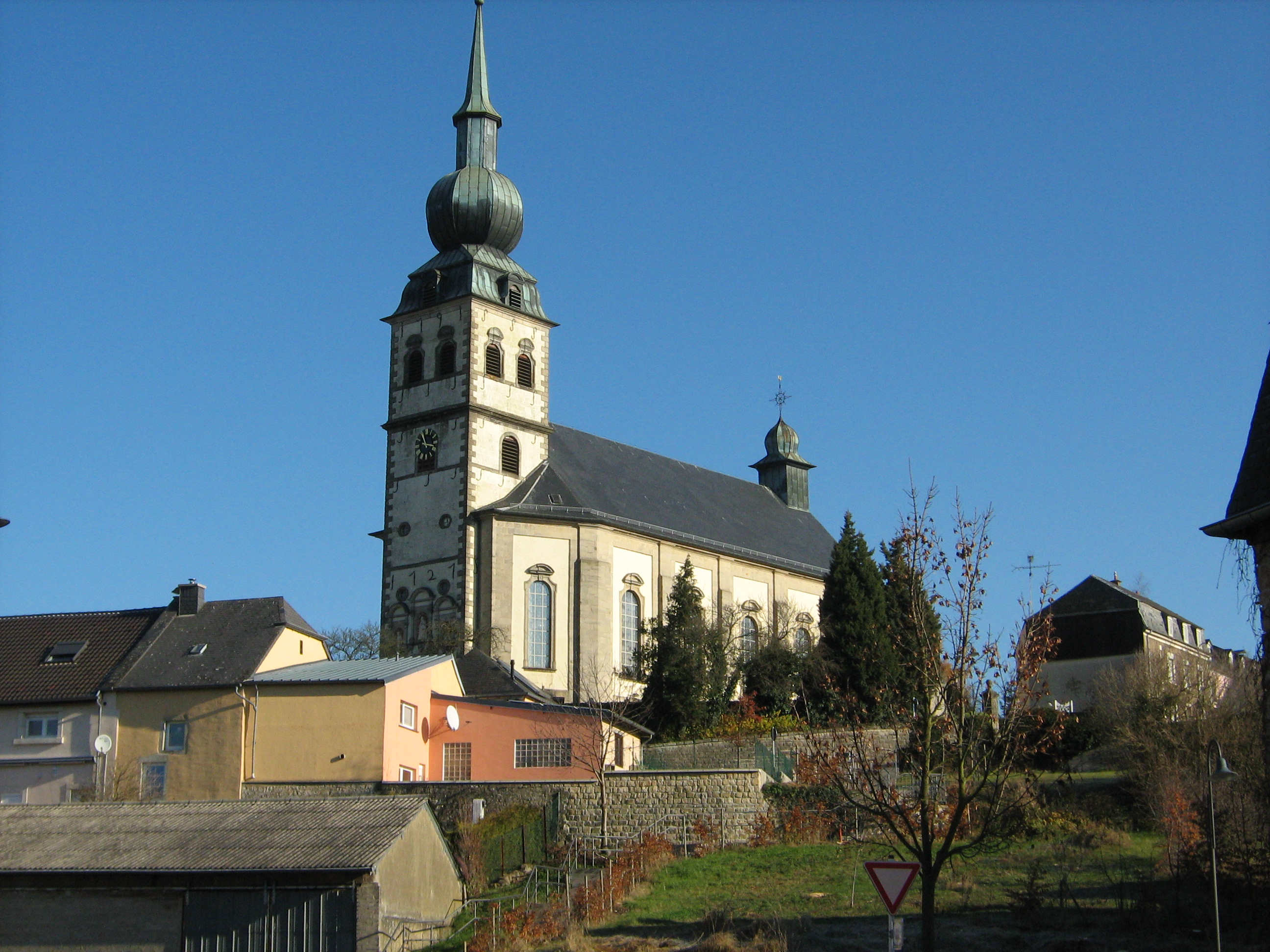
- Koerich church

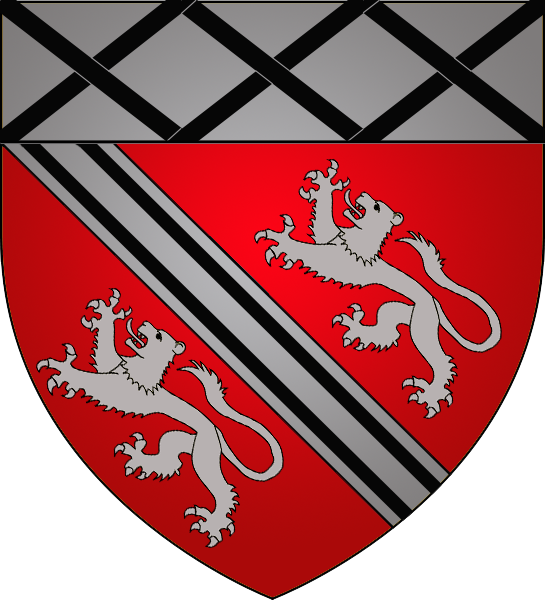
- Coat of arms

- Map of Luxembourg with Koerich highlighted in orange, and the canton in dark red
- Coordinates: 49.6667°N 5.95°E
- Country: Luxembourg
- Canton: Capellen

Government
  - Mayor: Daniel Wirth

Area
  - Total: 18.88 km^{2} (7.29 sq mi)
  - Rank: 62nd of 100
- Highest elevation: 368 m (1,207 ft)
  - Rank: 74th of 100
- Lowest elevation: 262 m (860 ft)
  - Rank: 65th of 100

Population (2025)
  - Total: 2,783
  - Rank: 62th of 100
  - Density: 147.4/km^{2} (381.8/sq mi)
  - Rank: 53rd of 100
- Time zone: UTC+1 (CET)
  - Summer (DST): UTC+2 (CEST)
- LAU 2: LU0000106
- Website: koerich.lu

Koerich (German pronunciation: [ˈkøːʁɪç]; Luxembourgish: Käerch) is a commune and village in western Luxembourg. It is part of the canton of Capellen.

As of 2023, the commune of Koerich has a population of 2,706. The other small communities in the commune are Goeblange, Goetzingen and Windhof. With its onion-towered church standing above the ruins of the medieval castle, Koerich has a particularly attractive rural setting although it is only 15 km west of Luxembourg City.

== Location ==
The village lies in the valley of the Goeblange stream which flows down to the River Eisch to the west. It is at the junction of the CR 109 to Goeblange and Capellen and the CR 110 to Windhof and Dippach. The centre of the village is 295 m above sea level while the residential developments to the north and south rise to a height of 320 m. The streets in the village are therefore very hilly. The surrounding countryside is a mixture of forests and open fields with mixed farming.

== History ==
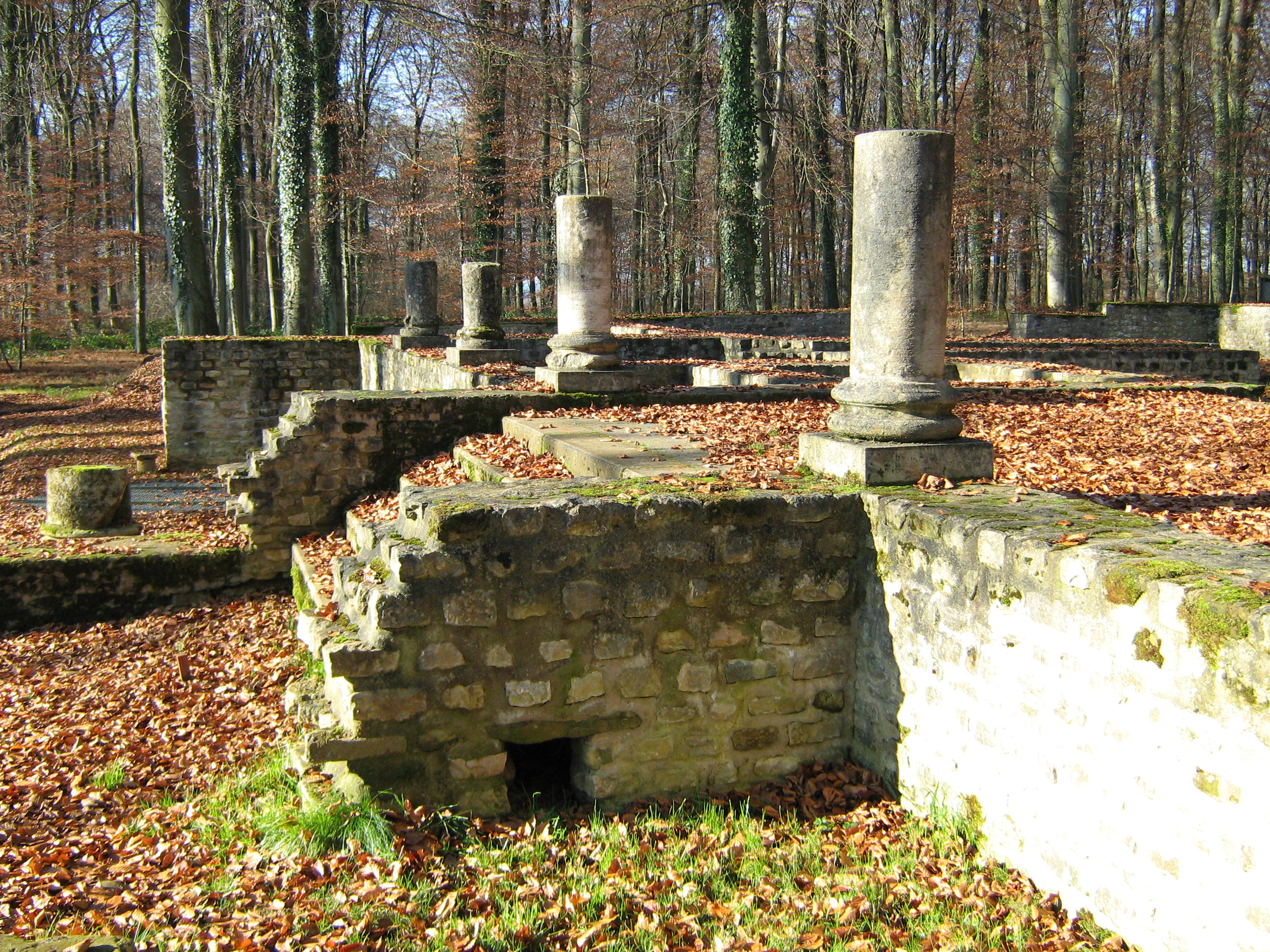
Goeblange: Ruins of the Roman Villa Rustica

The commune has a history extending back some 2,000 years. There is strong evidence that the Romans inhabited the area between the 1st and 4th centuries. To the south at Windhof the commune borders on the Kiem or Roman road from Trier to Reims and to the north-west, in the Miecher forest near Goeblange, impressive remains of a Roman farming community have been found. Two large villas have been excavated and the foundations partially rebuilt. There are other buildings and fortifications on the site which are now being uncovered.

According to the commune's website, the first documentary reference to Koerich was in 979 but it was not until the 12th century that its two castles were built: the Fockeschlass of which all traces have disappeared though it is shown on the first cadastral map in 1771; and the Grevenschlass whose ruins still dominate the centre of the village.

=== The castle ===
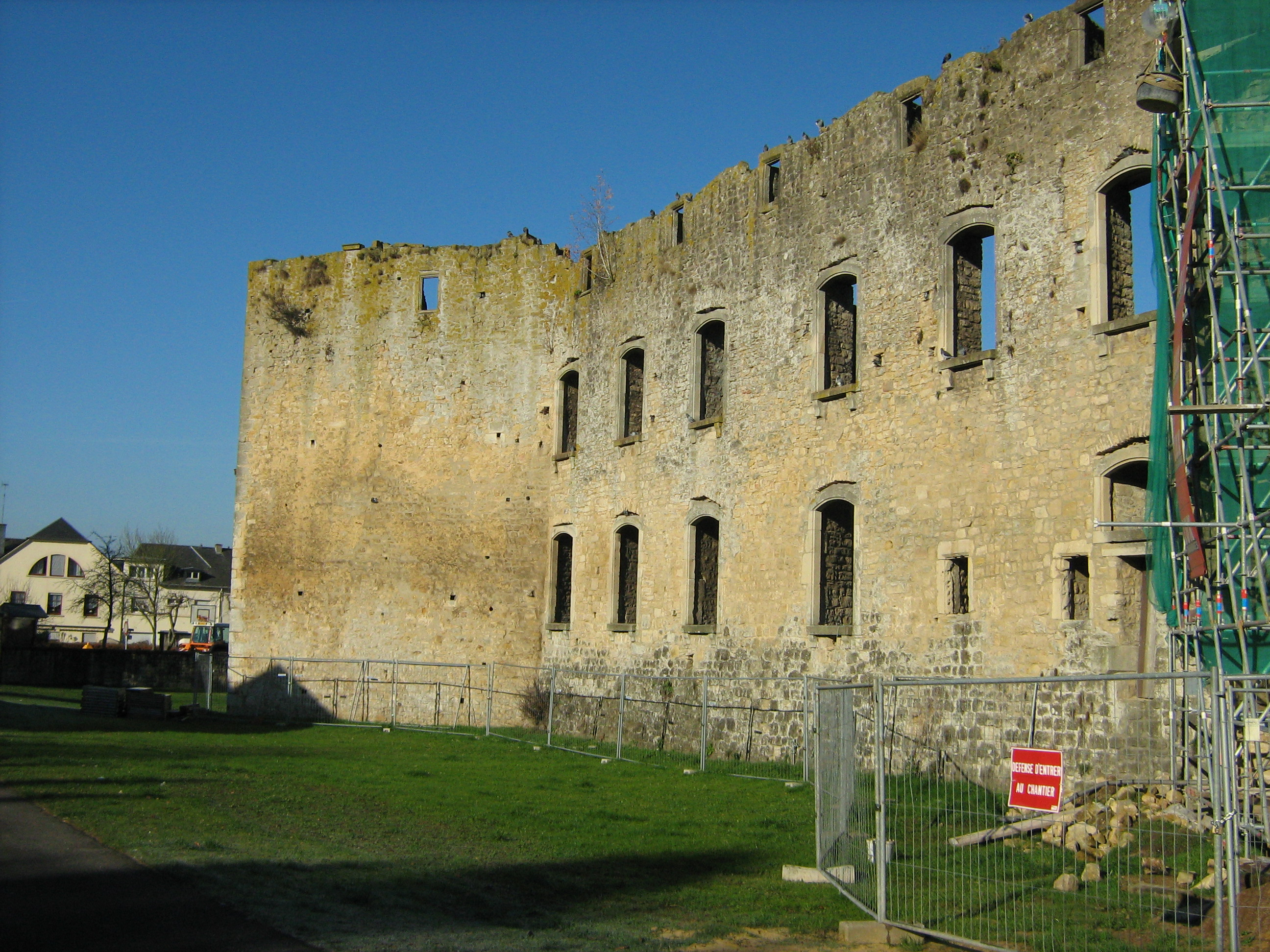
Koerich Castle

The Grevenschlass, now known as Koerich Castle, was built by Wirich I, Lord of Koerich and Seneschal of Luxembourg at the end of the 12th and beginning of the 13th century in late Romanesque style. It was expanded in 1304 by Godefroid of Koerich. The watchtower, now 11 m tall, was certainly much higher when it was built. Surrounded by a moat, the castle originally had a fortified entrance with a portcullis.

From 1380, Gilles of Autel and Koerich converted the stronghold into a more comfortable residence by building two 12-m towers at either end of the south wall. The south-western tower which still stands, houses a chapel on the ground floor.

In 1580, the new owner Jacques de Raville made further changes, demolishing part of the property and adding two Renaissance wings. The stately fireplace on the first floor and large rectangular windows testify to the castle's palatial splendor at the time. The south wing was again altered in 1728, this time with baroque additions.

After the death of the Ravilles in the second half of the 18th century, the castle started to fall into ruin owing to lack of maintenance. In 1950, Pierre Flammang, the last private owner, carried out some essential structural repairs before the castle finally came into the hands of the State. Today major repairs are in progress.

=== The church ===
There appears to have been a church in Koerich as long ago as the 12th century when there were references to Saint Remigius, its patron saint. In 1610, the existing church was pulled down and in its place, a new structure was built in Renaissance style. Various additions in Renaissance and baroque were made over the next hundred years; a tower, various lateral chapels in the choir, an impressive high altar, furnishings in the nave and, in 1727 a baroque tower. A huge bell was added in 1778. Finally, the tower was crowned with its distinctive onion-shaped spire in 1791. Apart from a new organ in 1969, there have been no further major additions. The church was fully restored in the early 1990s.

== Population ==
Historical population

Year	Pop.	±%
1821	964	—
1851	1,521	+57.8%
1900	1,343	−11.7%
1910	1,323	−1.5%
1922	1,323	+0.0%
1935	1,231	−7.0%

Year	Pop.	±%
1947	1,140	−7.4%
1960	1,250	+9.6%
1970	1,238	−1.0%
1981	1,392	+12.4%
1990	1,564	+12.4%
2000	1,837	+17.5%

Year	Pop.	±%
2005	1,859	+1.2%
2010	2,101	+13.0%
2015	2,440	+16.1%
2020	2,616	+7.2%
2021	2,642	+1.0%

Source data

== Notable people ==
- Arsène Mersch (1913–1980), a Luxembourgish professional road bicycle racer.

== Koerich today ==
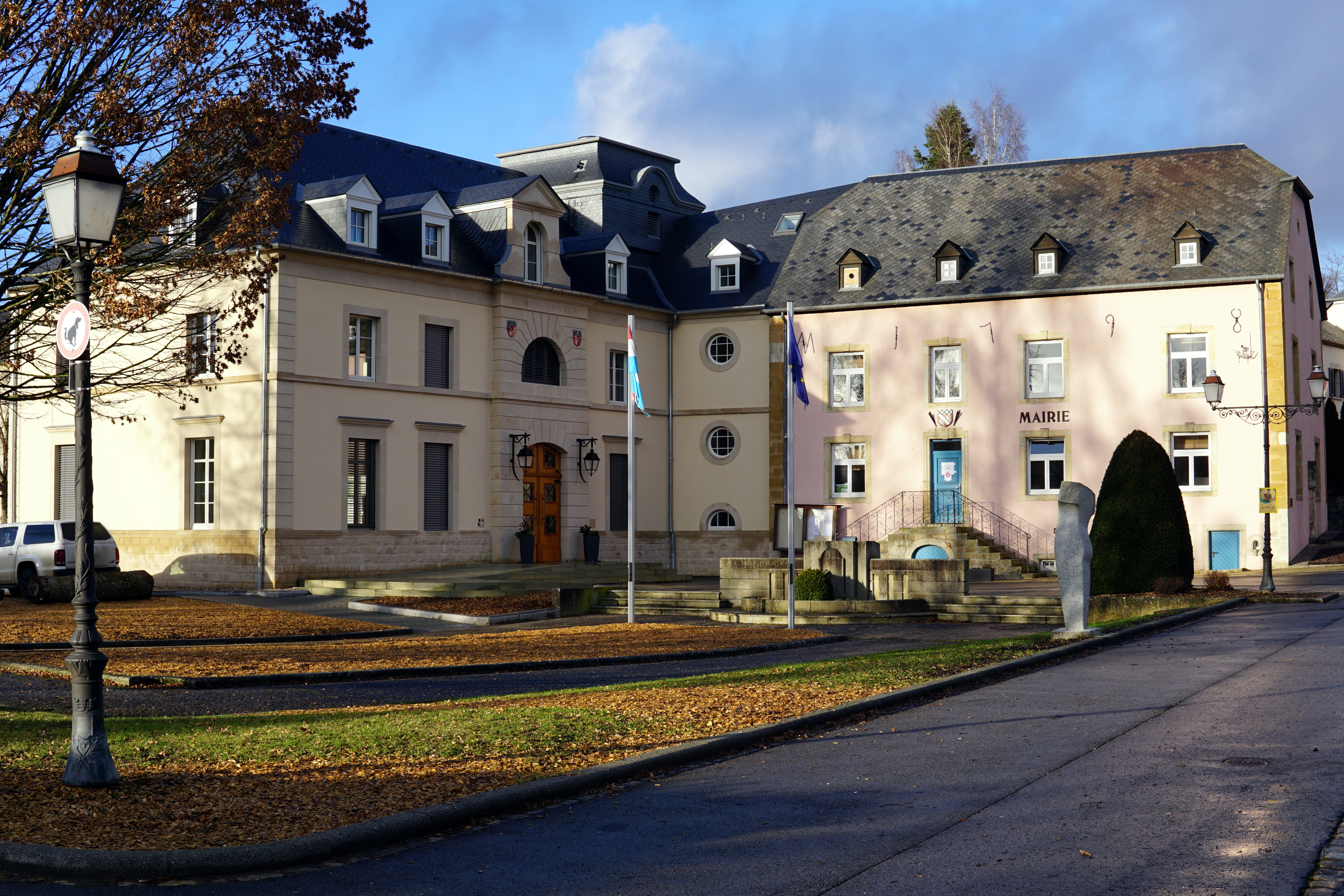
Koerich Townhall

Although Koerich still has a distinctly rural atmosphere, it has over the past 30 years become increasingly popular as a residential area. Many new properties, both detached houses and apartment buildings, have been constructed in and around the village. New shops and cafés have also opened.The nearest supermarket is Cactus in Windhof, less than a couple of kilometres from the heart of Koerich.There is also a new Lidl being inaugurated in 2022. The village of Koerich has not attracted new businesses. By contrast, Windhof, 2 km to the south has become a major new centre of business activity.

== Bibliography ==
- Evy Friedrich: Burgen und Schlösser, Editions Guy Binsfeld, Luxembourg, ISBN 3-88957-033-X
