= Keispelt =

Town in Luxembourg

Coordinates: 49°42′N 6°04′E

Keispelt (Luxembourgish: Keespelt) is a small town in the commune of Kehlen, in central Luxembourg. As of September 2026, the town has a population of 846.
