= Canton of Capellen =

Canton of Capellen Kanton Kapellen (Luxembourgish) Canton de Capellen (French)
- Canton
- Coat of arms

- Coordinates: 49°38′N 6°00′E
- Country: Luxembourg
- Legislative constituency: Sud
- LAU 1: LU00001
- Communes (cities in bold): Dippach; Garnich; Habscht; Käerjeng; Kehlen; Koerich; Kopstal; Mamer; Steinfort

Area
  - Total: 199.2 km^{2} (76.9 sq mi)
  - Rank: 9th of 12
- Highest elevation (11th of 12): 398 m (1,306 ft)
- Lowest elevation (12th of 12): 242 m (794 ft)

Population (2026)
  - Total: 56,562
  - Rank: 3rd of 12
  - Density: 283.9/km^{2} (735.4/sq mi)
  - Rank: 3rd of 12

Capellen (Luxembourgish: Kapellen) is a canton in southwestern Luxembourg. It is named after Capellen, which is not a commune but rather a section of the commune of Mamer. It borders Belgium.

== Administrative divisions ==
Capellen Canton consists of the following nine communes:

- Dippach
- Garnich
- Habscht
- Käerjeng
- Kehlen
- Koerich
- Kopstal
- Mamer
- Steinfort

== Mergers ==
- On 1 January 2012 the former communes of Bascharage and Clemency (both from Capellen Canton) were merged to create the commune of Käerjeng. The law creating Käerjeng was passed on 24 May 2011.
- On 1 January 2018 the former communes of Hobscheid and Septfontaines (both from Capellen Canton) were merged to create the commune of Habscht. The law creating Habscht was passed on 24 December 2017.

== Population ==
Historical population

Year	Pop.	±%
1821	10,685	—
1851	15,615	+46.1%
1900	15,744	+0.8%
1910	15,933	+1.2%
1922	16,054	+0.8%
1935	16,757	+4.4%

Year	Pop.	±%
1947	16,025	−4.4%
1960	17,767	+10.9%
1970	21,381	+20.3%
1981	27,148	+27.0%
1990	31,043	+14.3%
2000	36,687	+18.2%

Year	Pop.	±%
2005	38,329	+4.5%
2010	40,628	+6.0%
2015	44,509	+9.6%
2020	50,094	+12.5%
2021	50,733	+1.3%

Source data
