= St Hubert's Church, Bridel =

Catholic church in Bridel, Luxembourg

Coordinates: 49°39′23″N 6°04′45″E

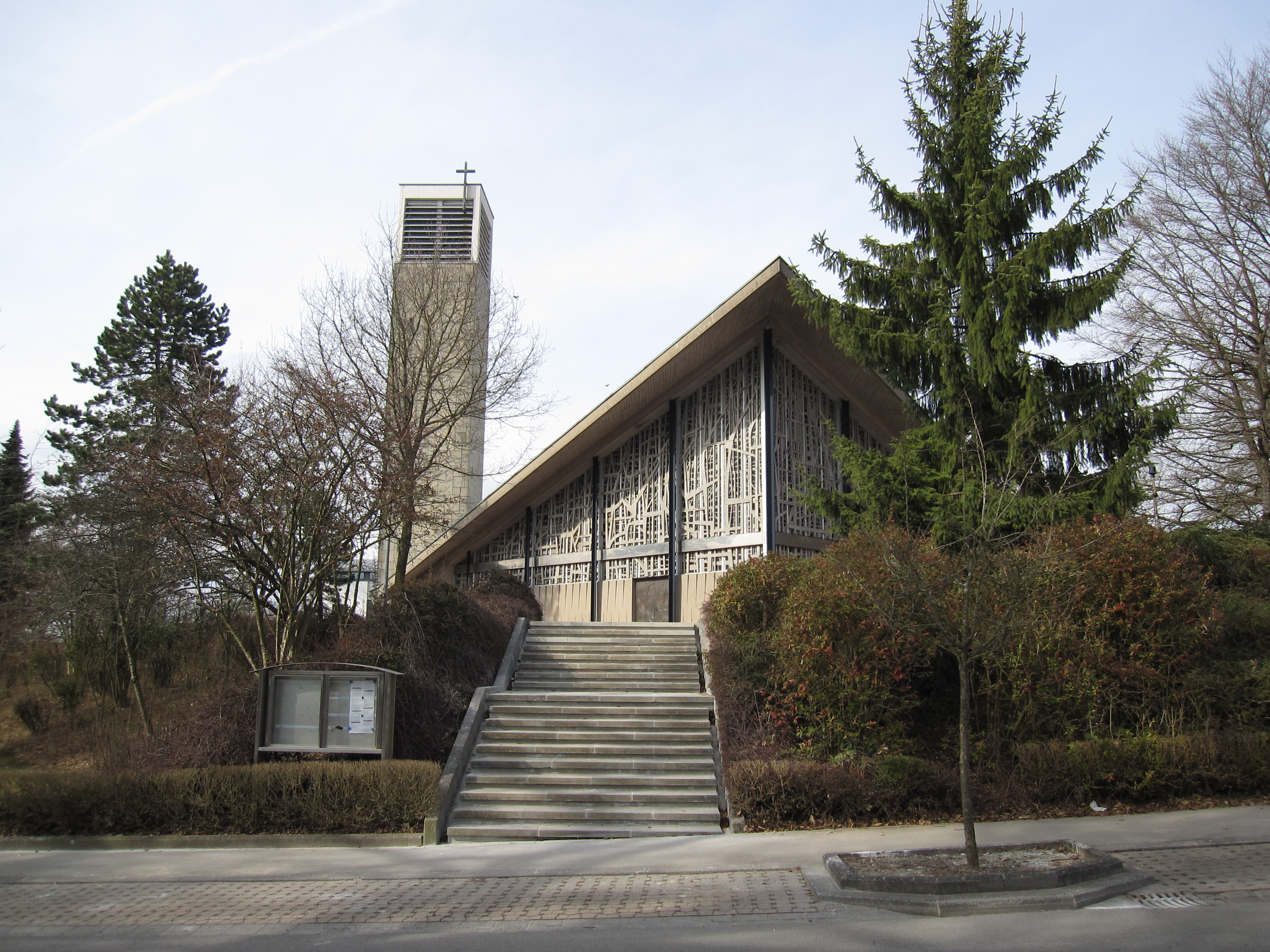
Christ the Saviour's Church in Bridel, Luxembourg

Christ the Saviour's Church is a Catholic church in Bridel, in the commune of Kopstal, Luxembourg. It belongs to the parish of Mamerdall Saint-Christophe and to the deanery of Luxembourg. The foundation stone for the church, dedicated to Saint Hubert, was laid on 9 November 1969. The plans were by Bridel architect René Schmit. It was consecrated on 19 March 1972 by Bishop Jean Hengen.

On 21 June 2017 it was added to the list of classified national monuments.

== Interior ==
The tabernacle and the cross were crafted by Jean Thill, the baptismal font by Thill and Schmit. The 307 m^{2} (3,300 sq ft) abstract glass concrete windows were created by Mett Hoffmann and Jean Thill. The doors were designed by Maggy Stein and show the Creation on one side and the tree of life on the other.

In 1990, the church received an organ from the Kleuker company of Brackwede, Bielefeld.

== Photos ==
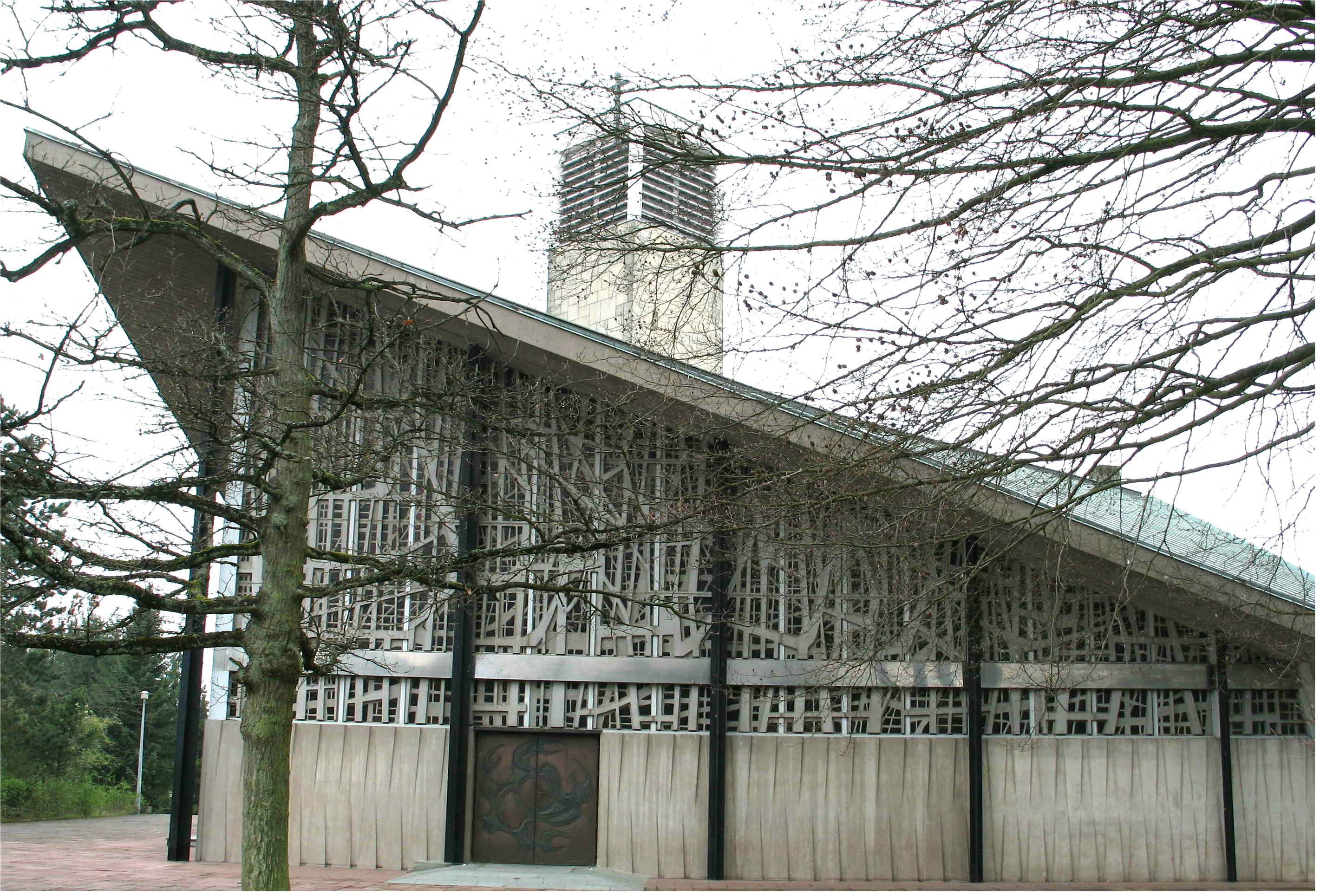
External view

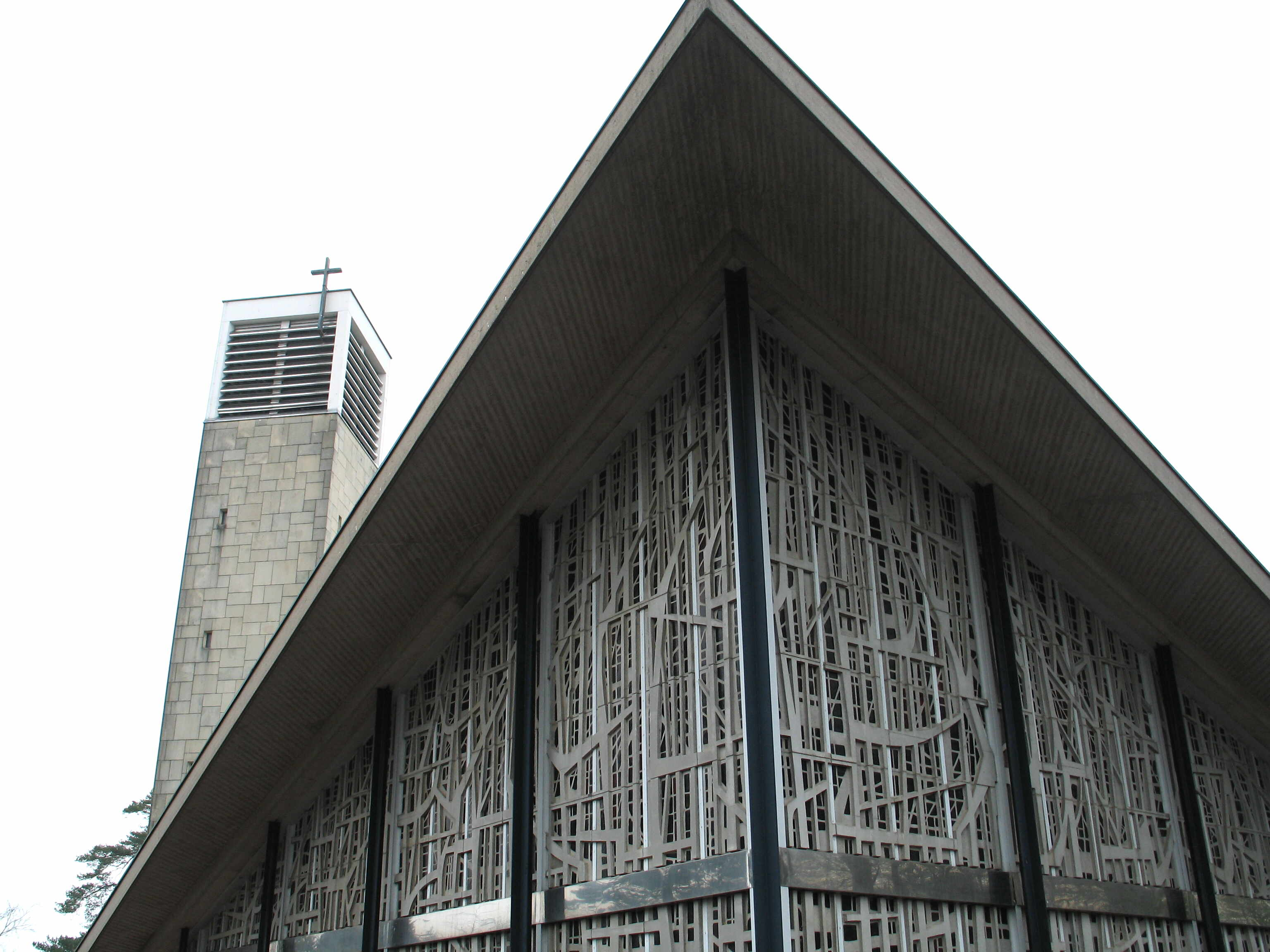
Architectural detail

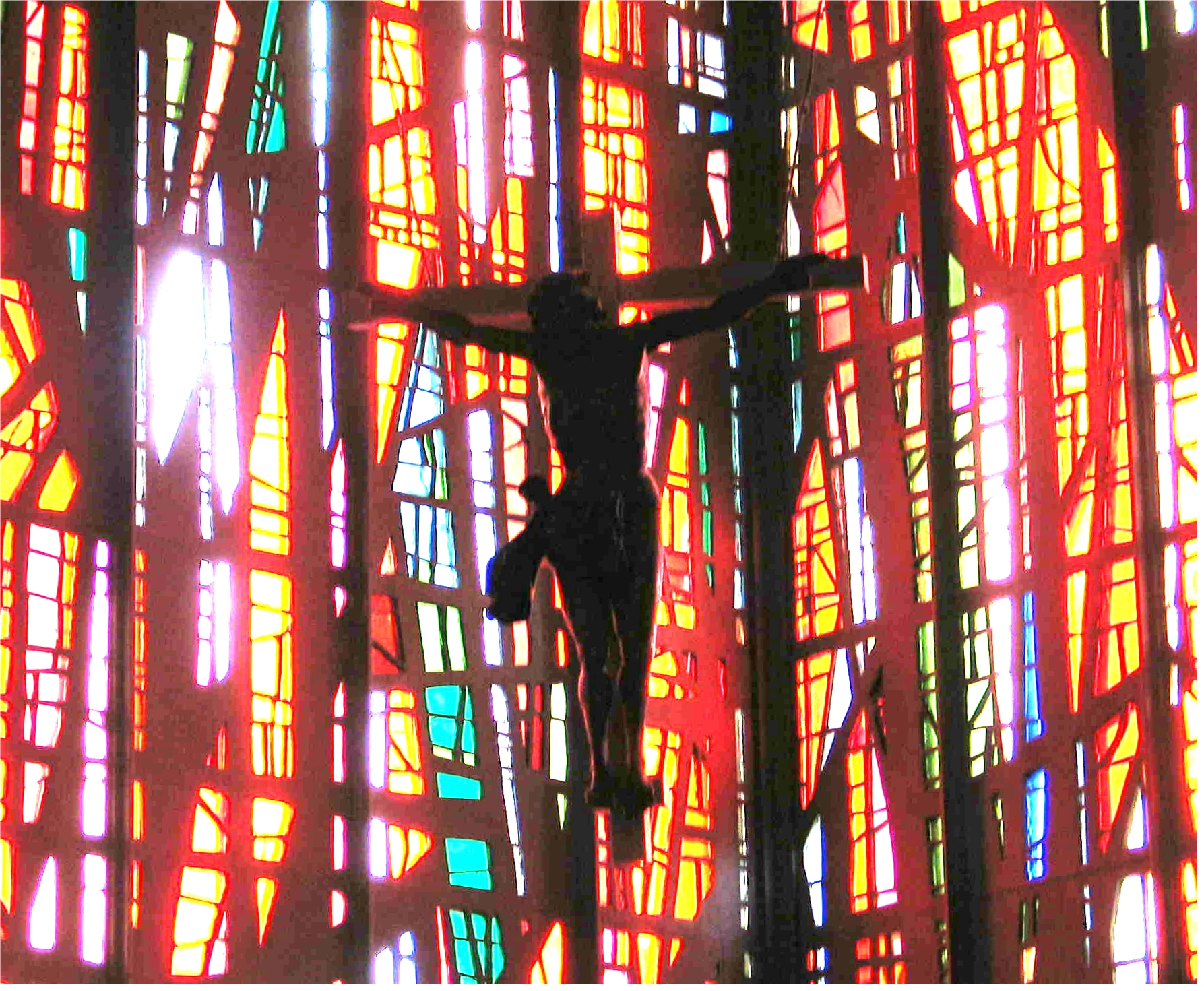
Interior
