= Emaischen =

Festival celebrated in the City of Luxemburg

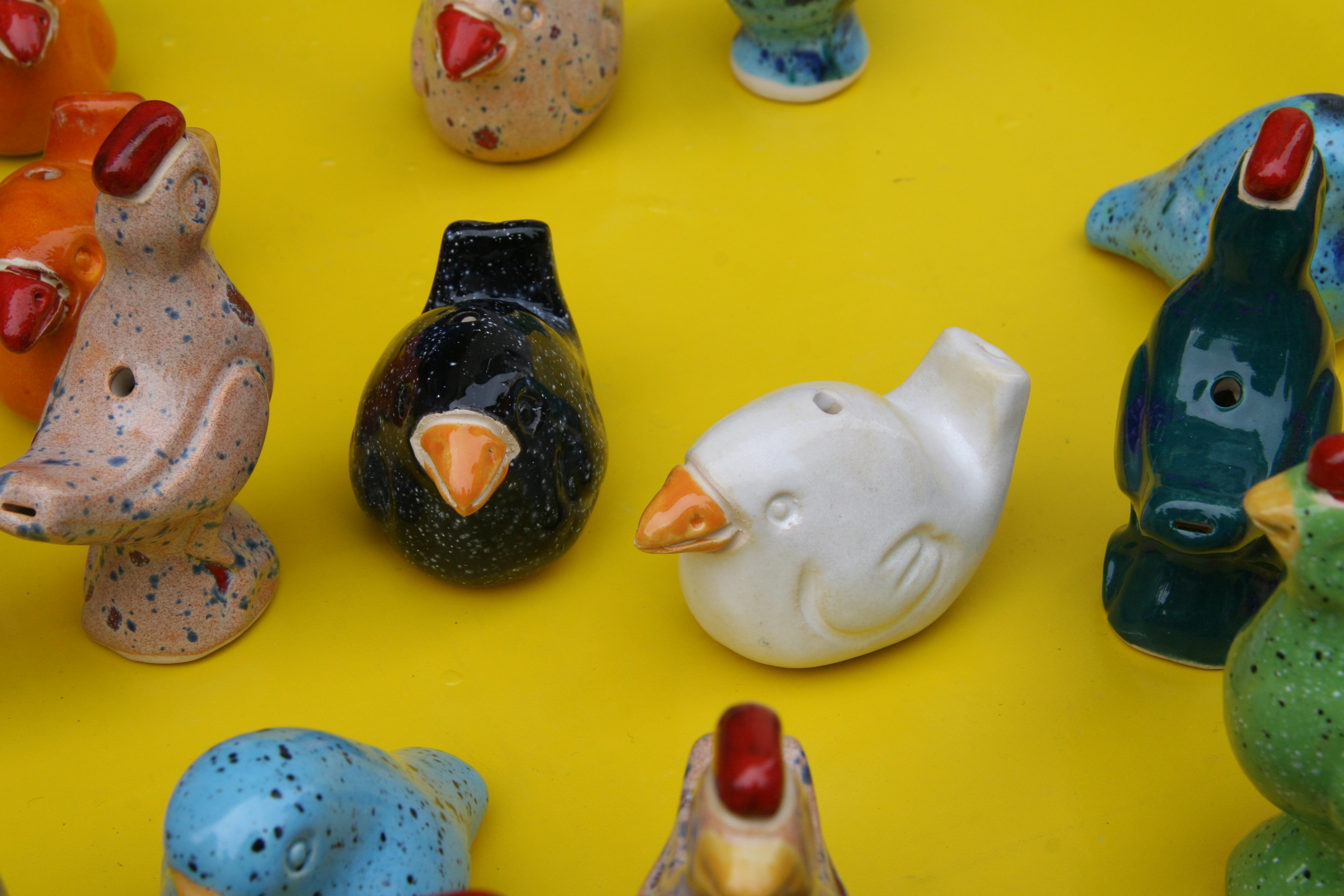
Nospelt peckvillercher

The Emaischen festival is celebrated every Easter Monday in the village of Nospelt in the south of Luxembourg as well as in the Fish Market in the City of Luxembourg. The festival has been celebrated in its current form since 1957. Little earthenware whistles shaped like birds and known as peckvillercher are a special feature of the event. The modern celebration involves the purchase of whistles, a craft fair and food stalls.

== History ==
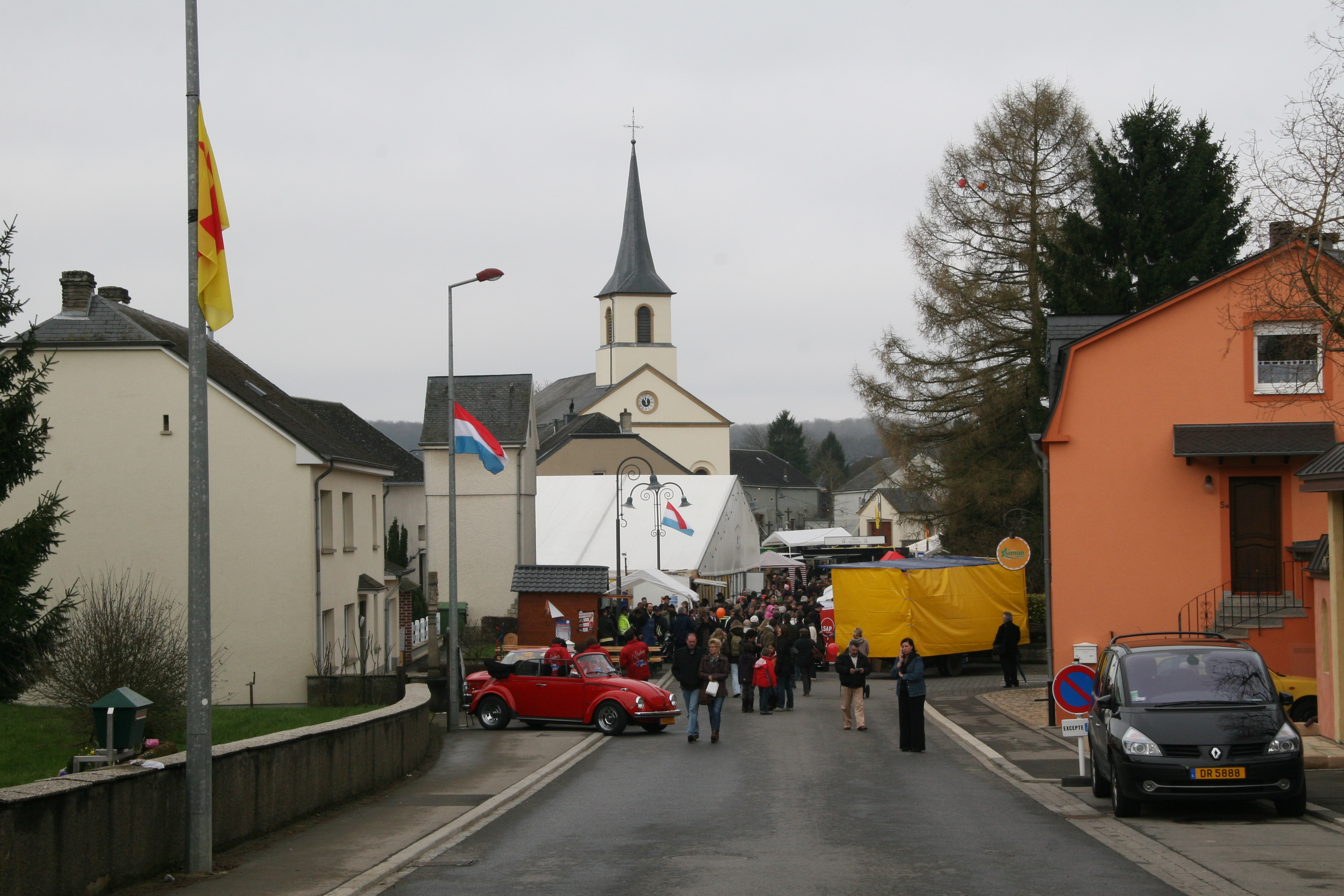
Emaischen celebrations in Nospelt

The Emaischen festival is celebrated every Easter Monday in the village of Nospelt in the south of Luxembourg as well as in the Fish Market in the City of Luxembourg. Little earthenware whistles shaped like birds and known as peckvillercher are a special feature of the event, as they are made locally and only sold on that day. Some have said that traditionally the whistles were exchanged between lovers but today they are popular with all those taking part in the celebrations. Nospelt used to be a village of potters who would make the little birds from the small amounts of clay left over at the end of the day. Today's Nospelt festival only goes back to 1957 when the potters once again began making the whistles, with a new design each year. The celebrations in Luxembourg's old town were revived in 1937 by Jean Peters, a ceramic artist from Reckental, who started making whistles from the red clay of Nospelt.

With a wide range of attractions and games, the Emaischen is particularly popular with children. There is also folk-dancing, a craft fair in the streets and food stalls.

The origins of the festival are not too clear but there may be a connection with the Biblical reference to a potter in the Book of Jeremiah, Chapter 18. In any case, there seem to have been several breaks in the tradition.
