= Meispelt =

Coordinates: 49°41′N 6°04′E

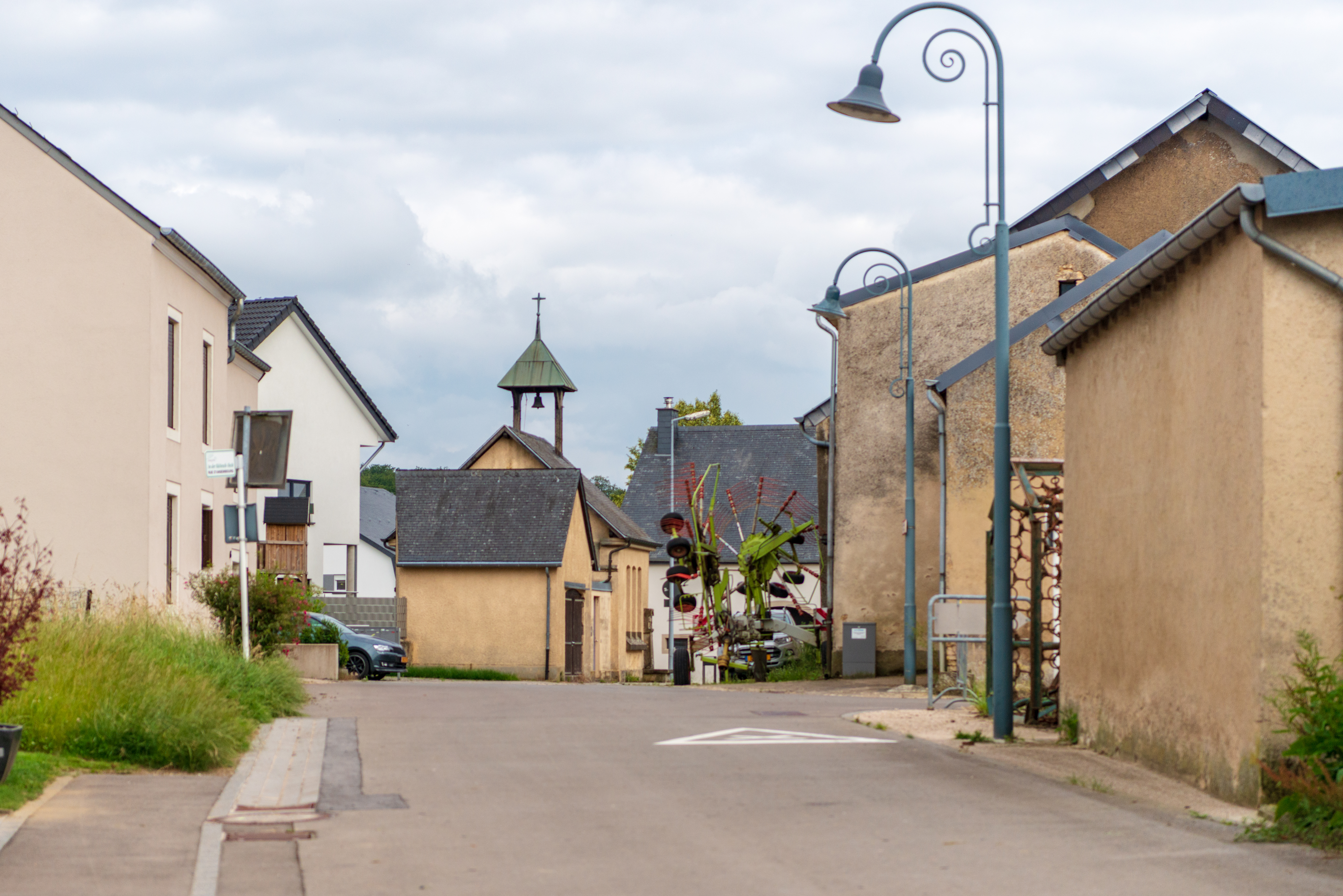
Streets in Meispelt

Meispelt (Luxembourgish: Meespelt or Meester) is a small town in the commune of Kehlen, in western Luxembourg. As of September 2026, the town had a population of 359.
