= Olm, Luxembourg =

Coordinates: 49°39′N 6°00′E

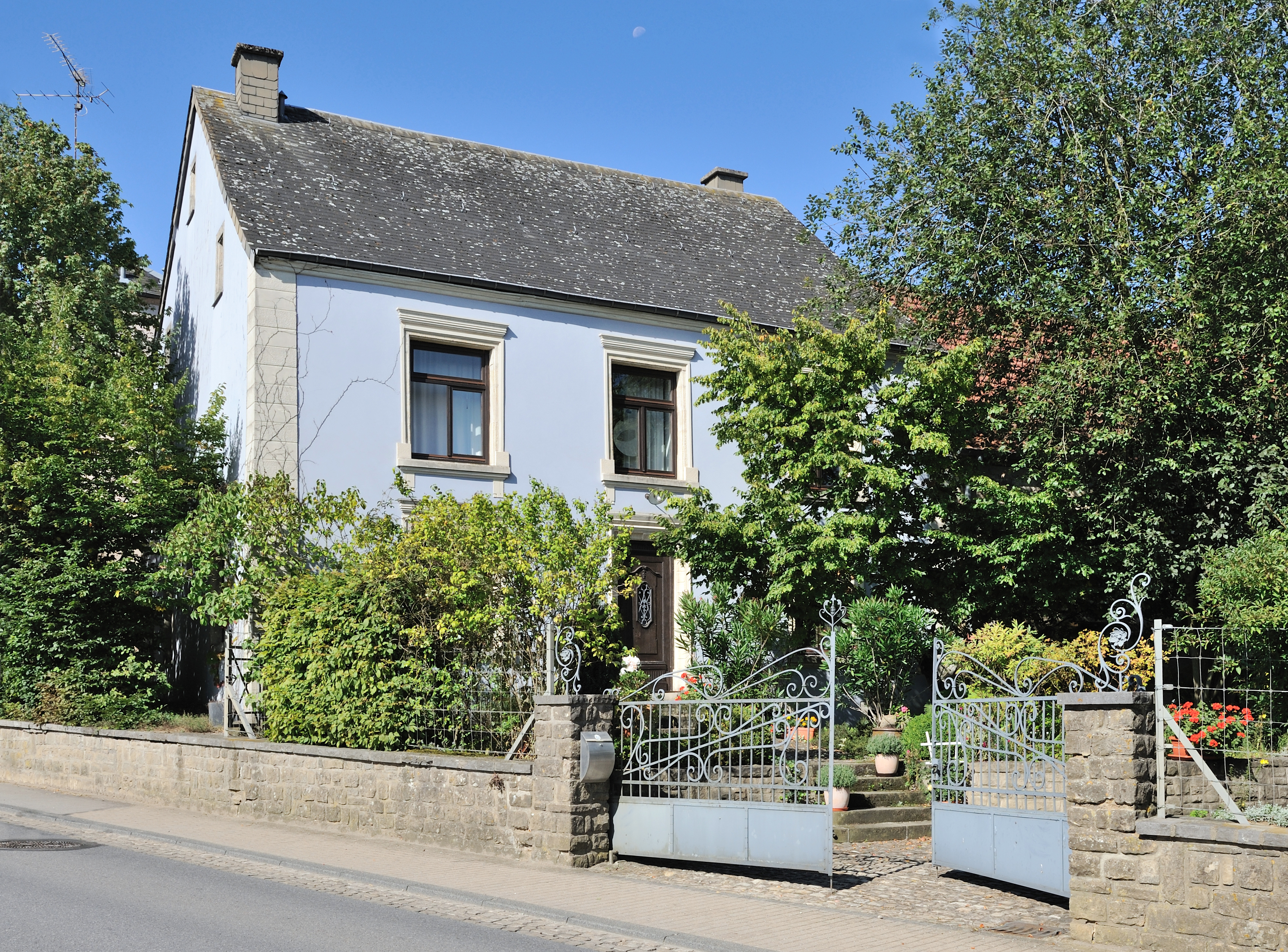
Street of Olm, Luxembourg

Olm (German pronunciation: [ɔlm]; Luxembourgish: Ollem) is a town in the commune of Kehlen, in western Luxembourg. As of September 2026, the town had a population of 2,350.
