= Nicolas Puzos =

French obstetrician

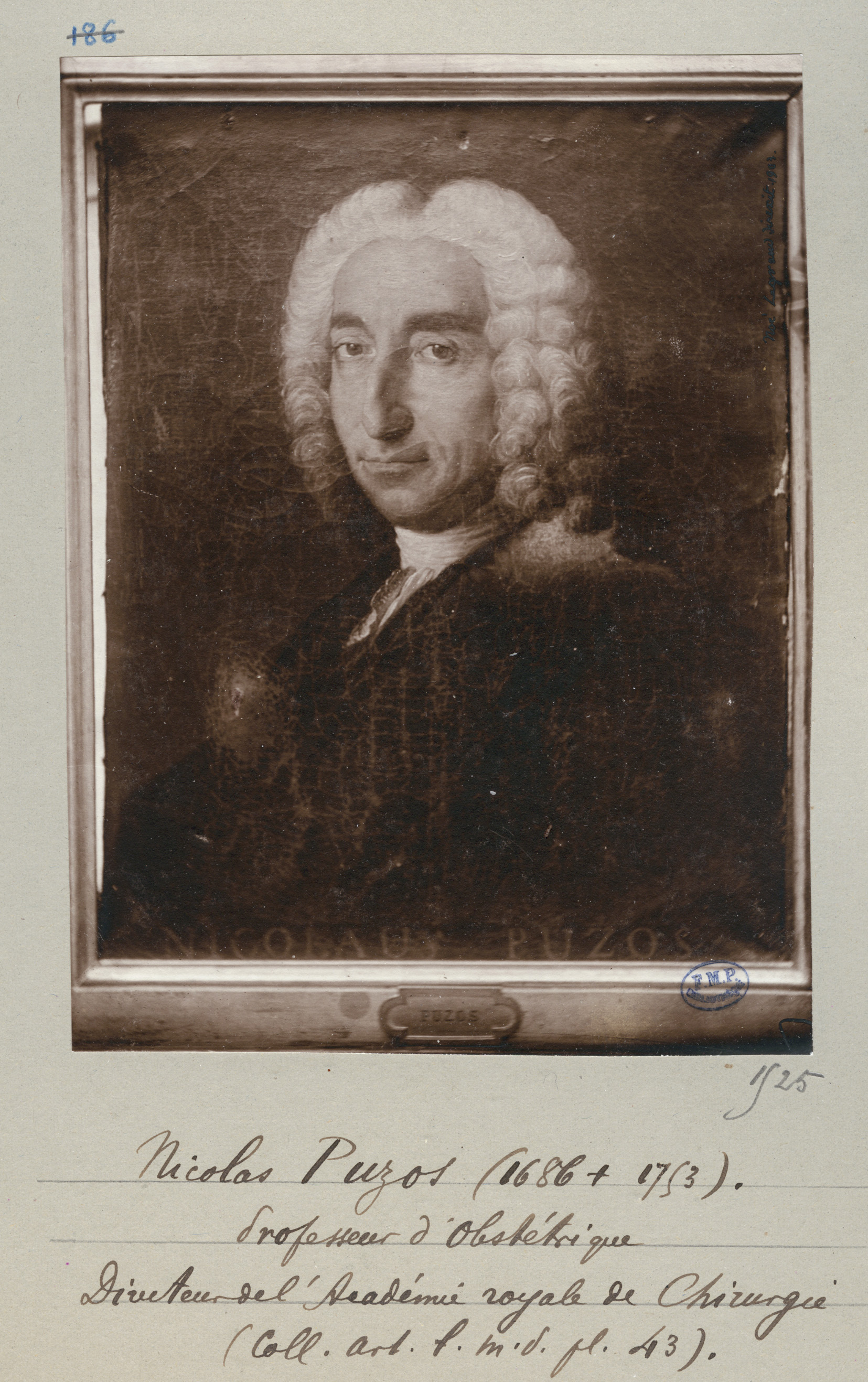
Nicolas Puzos

Nicolas Puzos (1686–1753) was a French obstetrician in the 18th century.

Puzos first started in medical studies in 1702 when his father sent him as an aide-major with the French army so he could learn surgery. He next studied under Julien Clément.

Morisot-Deslandes posthumously published Puzos notes as Traité des Accouchements de M. Puzos in 1759.

Among other things Puzos is cited for his view that patients in childbirth should be bled.
