= Dondelange =

Coordinates: 49.6881°N 6.0307°E

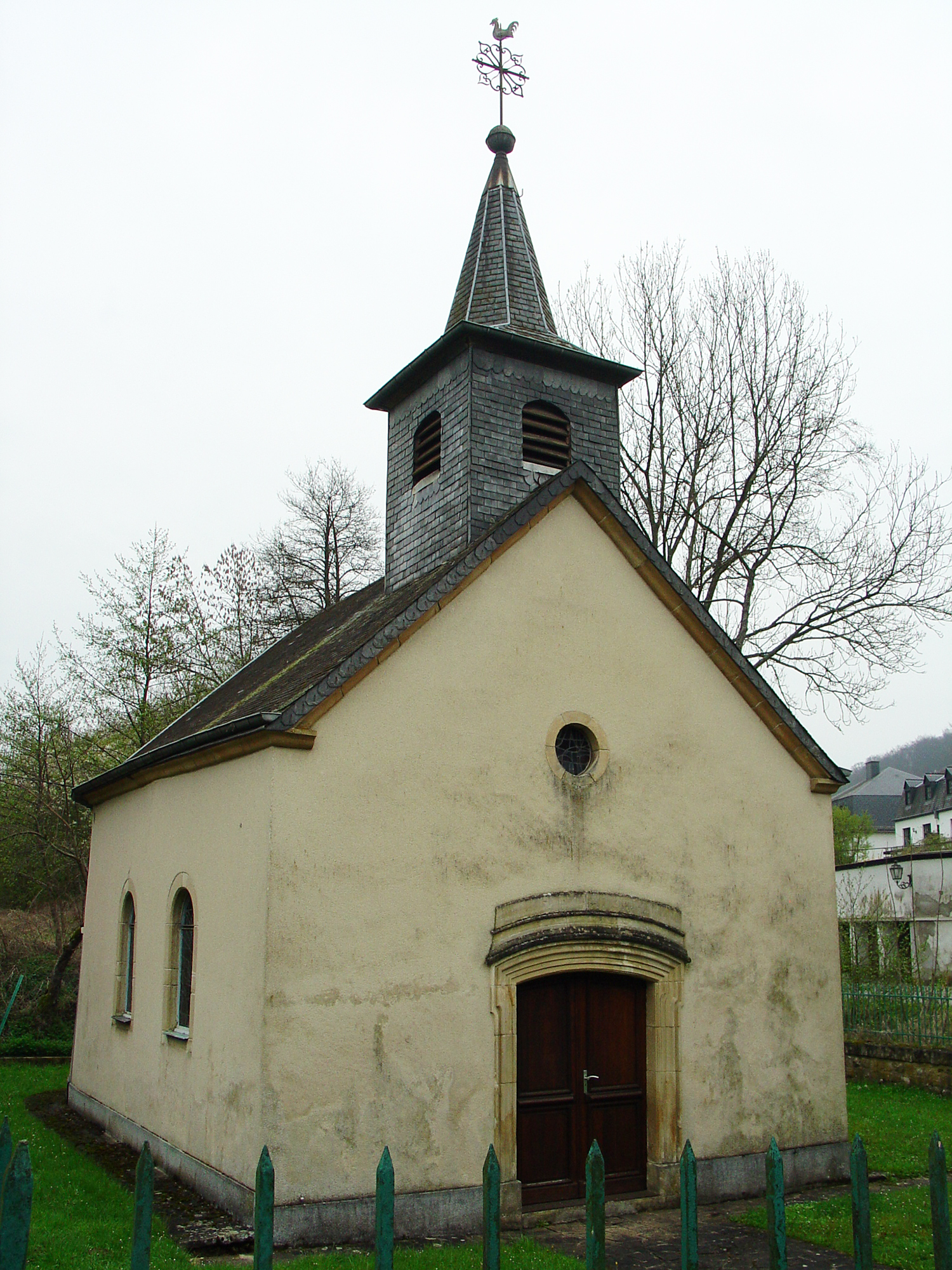
Historic Chapel in Dondelange, Kehlen, Luxembourg. April 2005

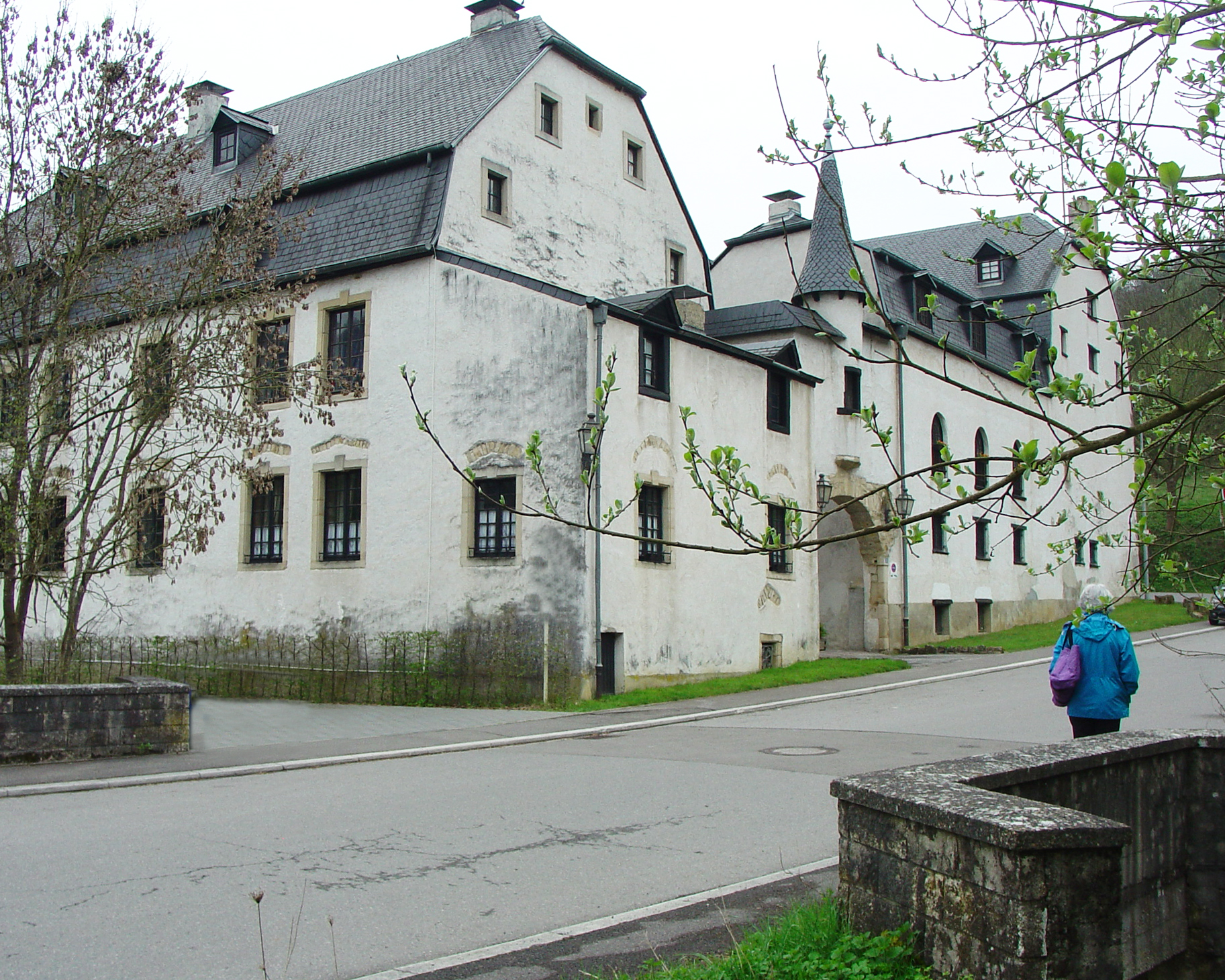
The historic mansion in Dondelange, Kehlen, Luxembourg. April 2005

Dondelange (Luxembourgish: Dondel, German: Dondelingen) is a village in the commune of Kehlen, in south-western Luxembourg. The village has a historic chapel, and a large historic mansion. As of September 2026, the village has a population of 208. The surnames Dondlinger, Dondelinger, and Donndelinger are derived from the name of this village.
