= Eischen =

Town in Luxembourg

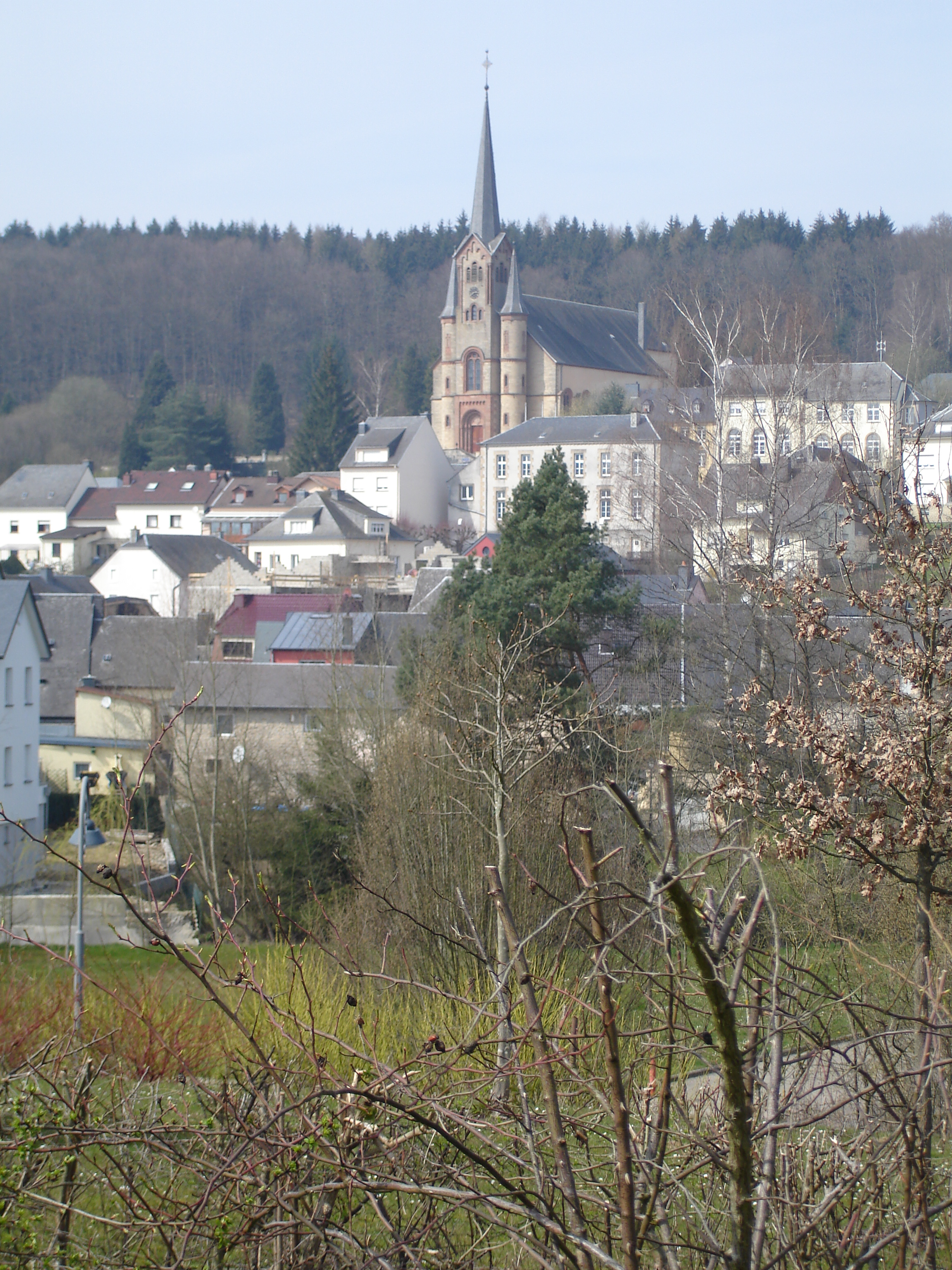
Eischen seen from Op der Gare

Eischen (German pronunciation: [ˈaɪʃn̩]; Luxembourgish: Äischen) is the largest town in the commune of Habscht in south-western Luxembourg, and its administrative centre. As of 2026, the town has a population of 2,284.

== Name ==
Eischen takes its name from the river Eisch, which flows through the town. Its etymology goes back to the Celtic word isc or ysche, meaning water. Since the 13th century, the town is mentioned in various chartas, with different spellings (e.g. Eysch, Eske, Yxen).

Town administration

== Geography ==
Eischen is situated in the west/south-western part of Luxembourg. Surrounded by forests on all sides, it borders to the east on the small town of Hobscheid, with which it forms an administrative unity, to the south-east, a road leads to the town of Steinfort, to the south and west, it borders on the Belgian Province of Luxembourg and to the north lies the small hamlet of Gaichel. The river Eisch runs through the centre of town from west to east, approximately following the road to Hobscheid.

== History ==
The area around Eischen has been populated at least since Gallo-Roman times. In the first centuries AD, the Romans established a fortified settlement a few kilometres west of Eischen, across the border to Belgium in the area which is now known as Clairefontaine. Excavations in and around Eischen have brought to light Gallo-Roman graves from the 2nd century AD.

During the early Middle Ages, the Roman settlement evolved into the fortified Karlsbierg. This fortress politically and economically dominated the area around Eischen.

Op der Gare

In 1216, Ermesinde, Countess of Luxembourg founded the Abbey of Clairefontaine, which soon invigorated the religious and economic life in the area. The countess released the inhabitants of Eischen from serfdom. The town is first mentioned in 1247, in Ermesinde's testament. During the following centuries, property rights concerning the extended forests between Eischen and Clairefontaine were a source of constant quarrel between the town inhabitants and the monastery.

In 1839, the French-speaking part of Luxembourg came under Belgian rule. This turned Eischen into a border town, separating it from Clairefontaine and the town of Arlon, which now belonged to the new state of Belgium.

In 1880, the town's railway station was inaugurated. The railway line running through Eischen connected Petingen in the south to Ettelbruck in the north of the country. It was abandoned in 1969. The area of the former railway station in still known as Op der Gare (or, in English, At the station).

== The church ==
In the 1860s, the new parish church of Eischen was erected by Jean Fournel. The church is now a predominant architectural feature of Eischen. It is situated on a hill overlooking the town. The main tower stands 53 m tall, flanked by two slender round sidetowers. The main entrance portal, reminiscent of the neo-romance architectural style, is crowned by a relief representing Saint Peter as keeper of the keys to Heaven.

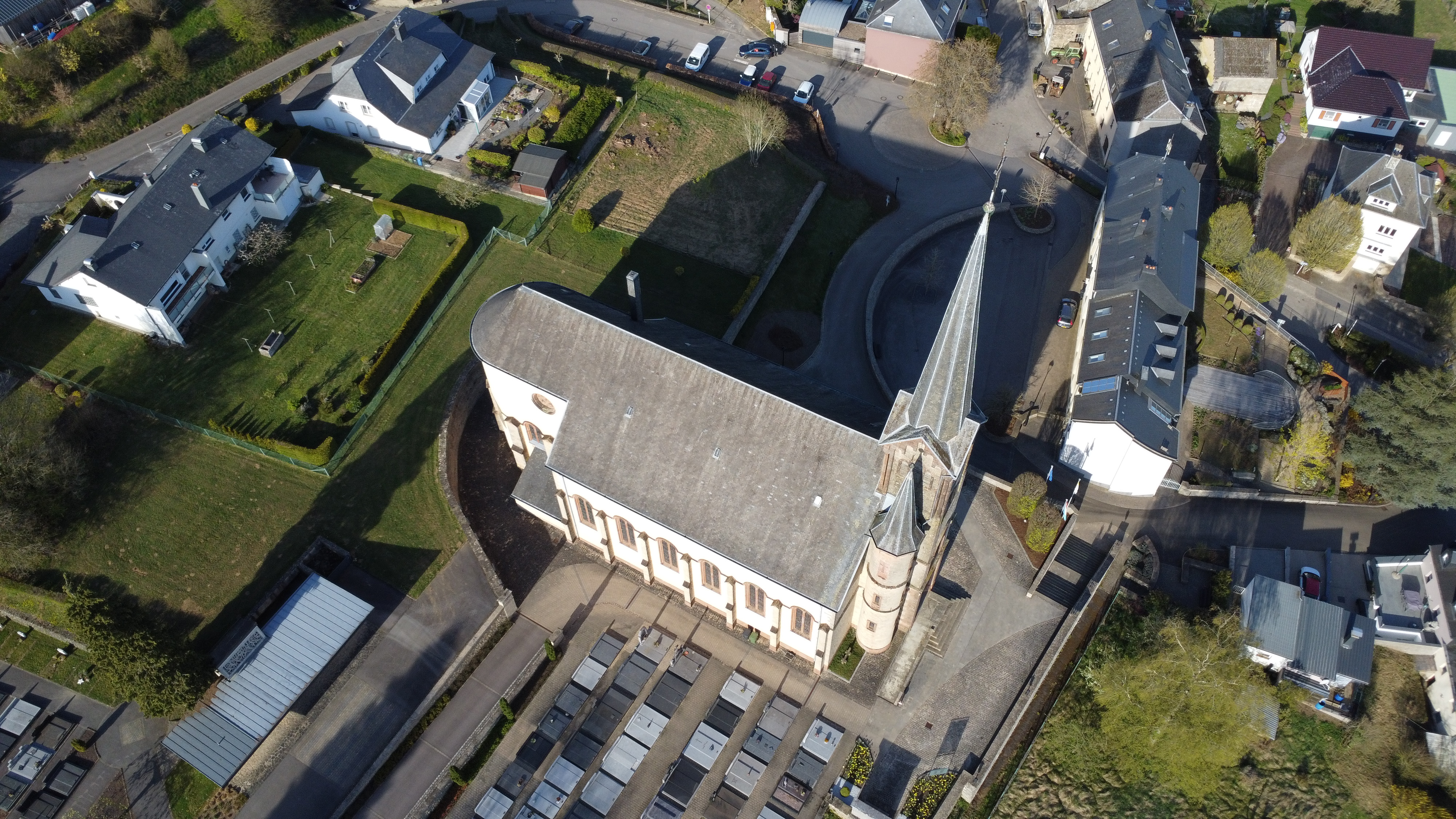
The church

The vast, high nave of the church's interior is separated from the lower aisles by an arcade. The three-sided main altar presents rococo-style gold ornaments in between which are placed the three figures of Saint Peter, Saint Paul and Jesus. The side altars are built in a similar style, with the Virgin Mary holding baby Jesus in the left side altar, and a statue of Saint Joseph to the right.

The local holiday, or kermesse, is celebrated on the first Sunday in August, on the feast day of the patron saint of the town, Saint Peter.

== Trivia ==
- To the north of the town lies the hamlet of Gaichel. It is renowned for its golf course, which is located partly on Luxembourgish and partly on Belgian territory.
- The chapel of Rentert was built in the 17th century. It belongs to the parish of Eischen, even though it lies on Belgian territory.
- The area around Eischen is ideally suited for hiking. A hiking and bicycle trail leads from Steinfort through the forest to Eischen.
- The popular social network, Facebook, has a group called "I'm an Eischen".
