= Bridel =

Town in the commune of Kopstal, central Luxembourg

Coordinates: 49°39′27″N 6°04′50″E

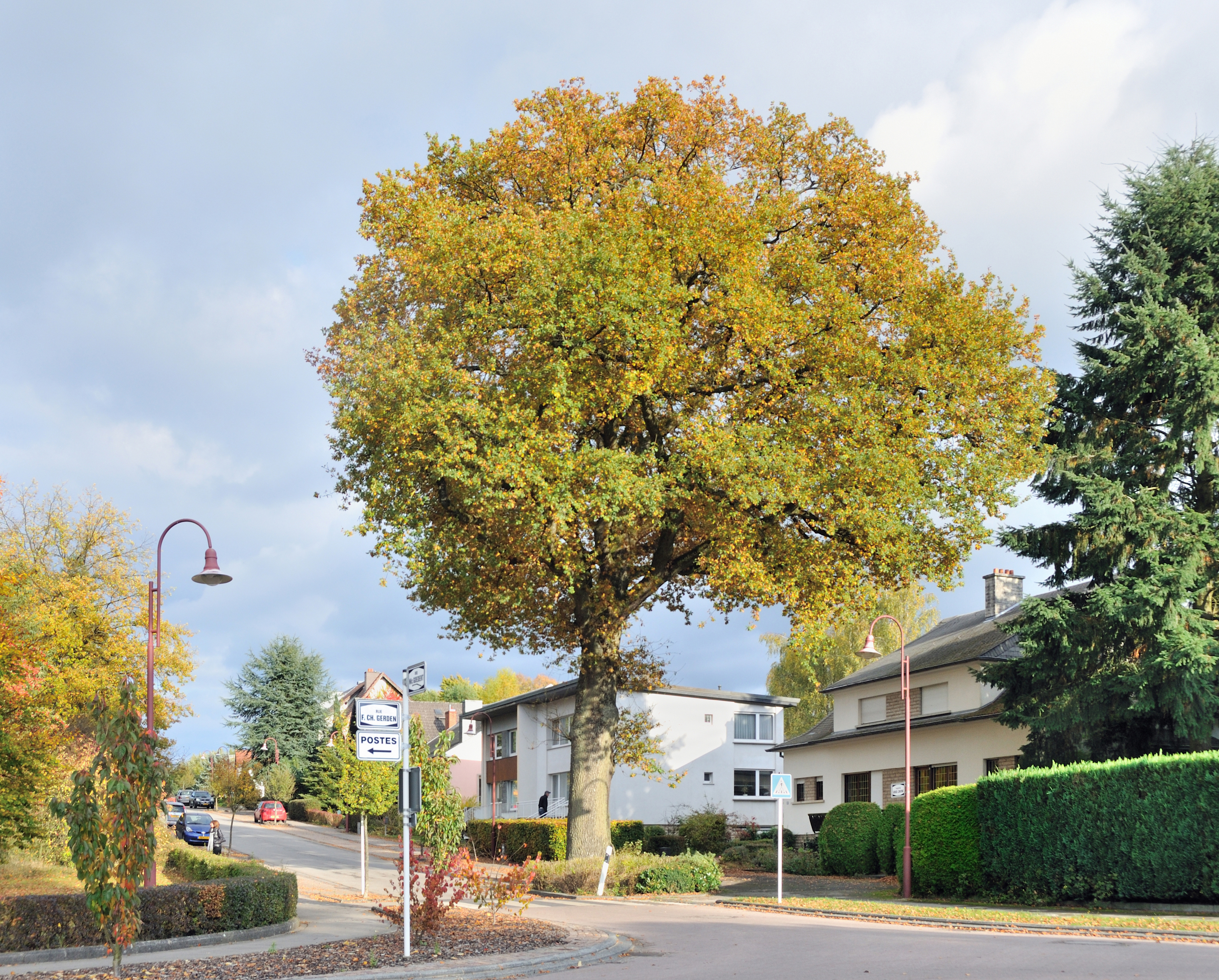
Image of Luxembourg, Bridel Sessile Oak

Bridel (Luxembourgish: Briddel) is a town in the commune of Kopstal, central Luxembourg. As of September 2026, the town has a population of 3,644.

== History ==
Bridel used to belong to the commune of Steinsel until the law of February 22, 1853, when it became part of Kopstal.

- 1956 - Start of the construction of the church
- 1961 - Inauguration of the primary school
- 1972 - Inauguration of the church

== Landmarks ==
- St Hubert's Church, listed national monument of Luxembourg
- Affection, a bronze sculpture from Lucien Wercollier
- Ancient linden tree on rue du tilleul
- Ancient pine tree on rue Lucien Wercollier
- Ancient oak tree on place du gros chêne
- Hall Sportif Bridel, a sports hall complexe whose architecture won the Bauhärepräis 2020 and got nominated for EU Mies Award 22
