= Piz Grisch (Albula Alps) =

Mountain in Switzerland

- Location within Switzerland

Highest point
- Elevation: 3,098 m (10,164 ft)
- Prominence: 171 m (561 ft)
- Coordinates: 46°31′03″N 09°47′07″E

Geography
- Location: Graubünden, Switzerland
- Parent range: Albula Alps

Piz Grisch is a mountain of the Albula Alps, located west of Celerina in the canton of Graubünden.
