= Habscht =

- Commune
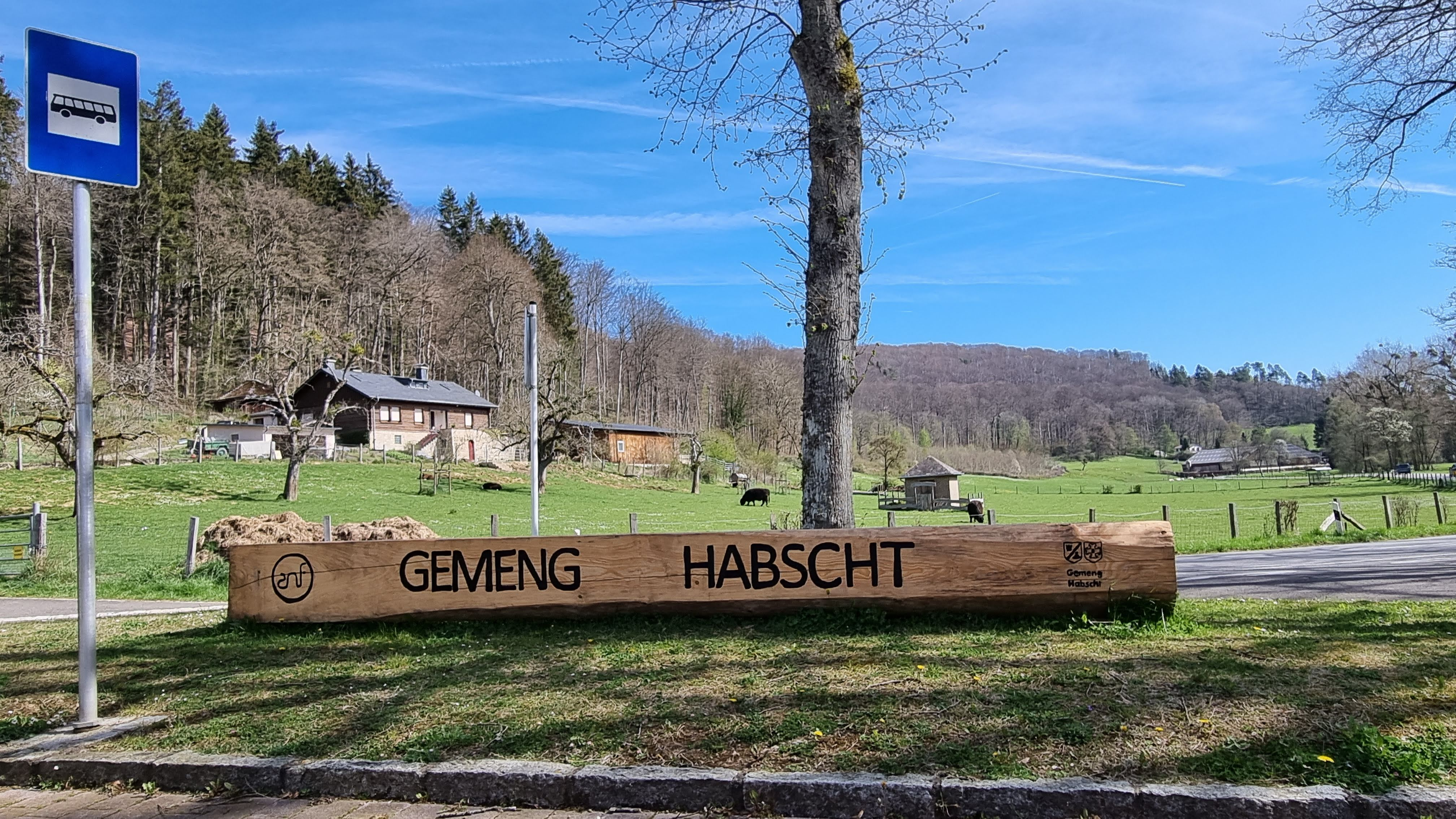

- Map of Luxembourg with Habscht highlighted in orange, and the canton in dark red
- Coordinates: 49°41′18″N 5°54′54″E
- Country: Luxembourg
- Canton: Capellen

Government
  - Mayor: Serge Hoffmann

Area
  - Total: 32.51 km^{2} (12.55 sq mi)
  - Rank: 21st of 100
- Highest elevation: 391 m (1,283 ft)
  - Rank: 60th of 100
- Lowest elevation: 242 m (794 ft)
  - Rank: 51st of 100

Population (2025)
  - Total: 5,260
  - Rank: 34th of 100
  - Density: 162/km^{2} (419/sq mi)
  - Rank: 51st of 100
- Time zone: UTC+1 (CET)
  - Summer (DST): UTC+2 (CEST)
- LAU 2: LU0000103

Habscht is a commune in central Luxembourg, in the canton of Capellen.

It was established on 1 January 2018 from the amalgamation of the communes of Hobscheid and Septfontaines.

== Populated places ==
The commune consists of the following villages:

- Hobscheid Section:
  - Eischen (seat)
  - Hobscheid
  - Eechelsbarrière (lieu-dit)
  - Felleschmillen (lieu-dit)
  - Gaichel (lieu-dit)
  - Jénkenhaff (lieu-dit)
  - Kreuzerbuch (lieu-dit)
  - Seemillen (lieu-dit)

- Septfontaines Section:
  - Greisch
  - Roodt-sur-Eisch
  - Septfontaines
  - Simmerfarm
  - Simmerschmelz
  - Leesbach
