= Hobscheid =

Hobscheid Habscht
- Former commune
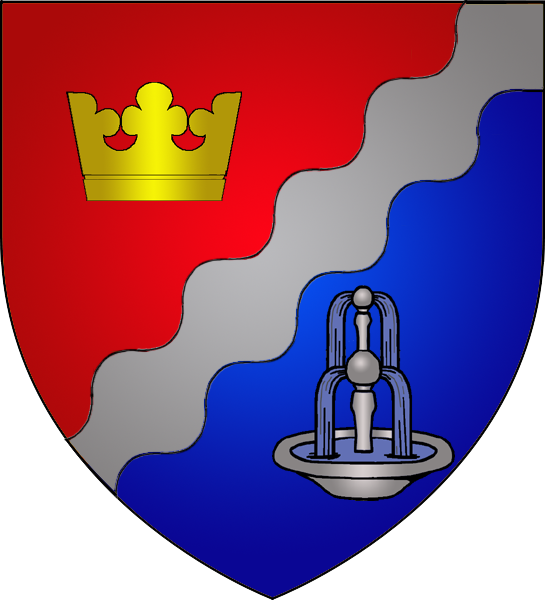
- Coat of arms

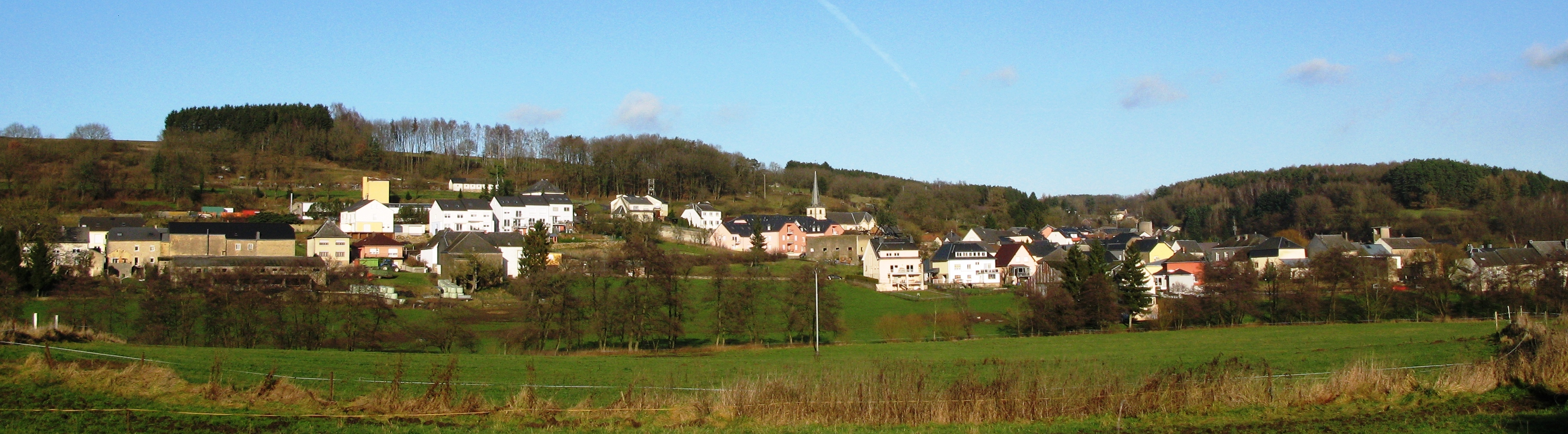
- Country: Luxembourg
- Canton: Capellen
- Commune: Habscht

Government
  - Mayor: Serge Hoffmann
- Website: hobscheid.lu

Hobscheid (Luxembourgish: Habscht) is a town in western Luxembourg. It is part of the commune of Habscht, in the canton of Capellen, which is part of the district of Luxembourg. As of 2026, it had a population of 2,072.

Hobscheid was the administrative centre of a commune by the same name until 2018, when it was merged with the commune of Septfontaines to form the commune of Habscht.

== Former commune ==
The former commune consisted of the villages:

- Eischen
- Hobscheid (Habscht)
