= Kopstal =

Town in Luxembourg

Kopstal Koplescht (Luxembourgish)
- Commune
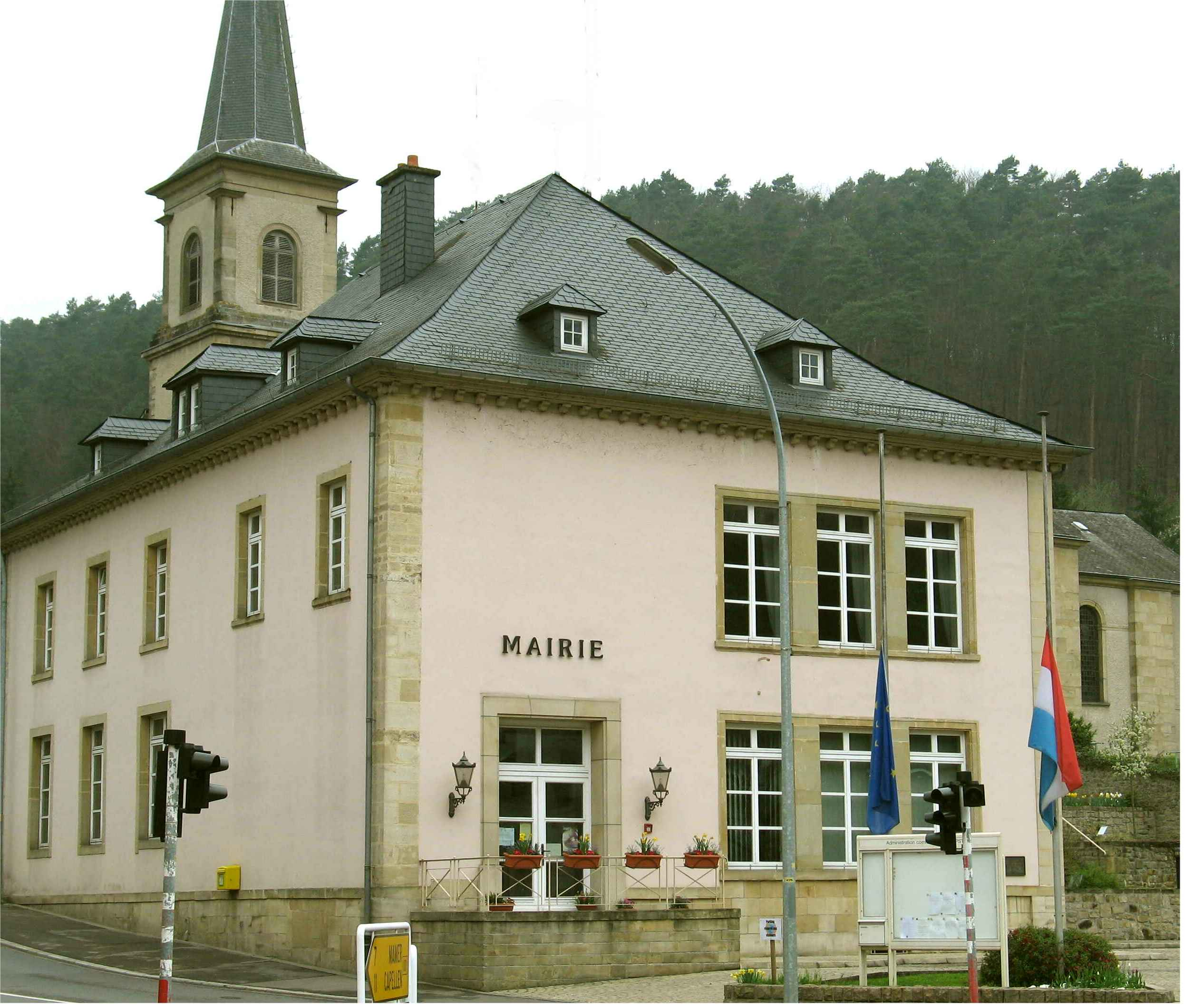
- The town hall

- Coat of arms

- Map of Luxembourg with Kopstal highlighted in orange, and the canton in dark red
- Coordinates: 49.664167°N 6.071944°E
- Country: Luxembourg
- Canton: Capellen

Government
  - Mayor: Thierry Schuman

Area
  - Total: 7.9 km^{2} (3.1 sq mi)
  - Rank: 97th of 100
- Highest elevation: 392 m (1,286 ft)
  - Rank: 59th of 100
- Lowest elevation: 245 m (804 ft)
  - Rank: 55th of 100

Population (2025)
  - Total: 4,626
  - Rank: 42nd of 100
  - Density: 590/km^{2} (1,500/sq mi)
  - Rank: 15th of 100
- Time zone: UTC+1 (CET)
  - Summer (DST): UTC+2 (CEST)
- LAU 2: LU0000107
- Website: kopstal.lu

Kopstal (Luxembourgish: Koplescht) is a commune and a small town in central Luxembourg, situated in the canton of Capellen. The commune also includes the town of Bridel. The town itself, located in a valley between forested hills situated beneath Bridel, has a population of 1,085 as of 2026.

Kopstal was formed on 1 July 1853, when it was detached from the communes of Kehlen (in Capellen canton) and Steinsel (in Luxembourg canton). The law forming Kopstal was passed on the 22 February 1853.

== Population ==
Historical population

| Year | Pop. | ±% |
|---|---|---|
| 1821 | 663 | — |
| 1851 | 940 | +41.8% |
| 1900 | 1,019 | +8.4% |
| 1910 | 1,042 | +2.3% |
| 1922 | 1,041 | −0.1% |
| 1935 | 1,010 | −3.0% |

| Year | Pop. | ±% |
|---|---|---|
| 1947 | 1,060 | +5.0% |
| 1960 | 1,484 | +40.0% |
| 1970 | 2,295 | +54.6% |
| 1981 | 3,023 | +31.7% |
| 1990 | 3,028 | +0.2% |
| 2000 | 2,990 | −1.3% |

| Year | Pop. | ±% |
|---|---|---|
| 2005 | 2,986 | −0.1% |
| 2010 | 3,092 | +3.5% |
| 2015 | 3,337 | +7.9% |
| 2020 | 4,038 | +21.0% |
| 2021 | 4,116 | +1.9% |

Source data

== Notable people ==
- Willy Kemp (1925–2021), a Luxembourgish professional road bicycle racer.
