= Greisch =

Coordinates: 49°43′N 5°59′E

Greisch (German pronunciation: [ɡʁaɪʃ]; Luxembourgish: Gräisch) is a village in the commune of Habscht, in western Luxembourg. As of September 2026, the village had a population of 229.
