= Windhof =

Coordinates: 49°38′N 5°57′E

Windhof, Luxembourg: Centre of the village

Windhof (German pronunciation: [ˈvɪnthoːf]; Luxembourgish: Wandhaff) is a village in the south of the commune of Koerich in south-western Luxembourg. It lies on the N6 road from Luxembourg City to Arlon in Belgium. Although it was just a small collection of houses until about 20 years ago, it is now expanding rapidly as a business development area. As of September 2026, the village has a population of 97.

== Location ==
Windhof is located 15 km west of Luxembourg City at a strategic position for transport and communications on the N6 road from Luxembourg City to Arlon close to the busy European route E25 linking Luxembourg to Arlon and Brussels. It stands on the crossroads where the N6 intersects N13 to Koerich (north) and Dalhem (south). Windhof, at a height of 334 m, is the highest point in the vicinity.

== History ==
The history of Windhof dates back to Roman times owing to its location on the Kiem or Roman road from Trier to Reims. Some years ago, a Roman milestone was found on the Kiem between Capellen and Windhof. The road was probably constructed in the 1st century BC but it became particularly important in the 3rd and 4th centuries when Trier developed as an imperial residence.

A map from 1778 refers to today's Windhof as Koericher Heyde

The main road from Luxembourg to Arlon, now N6 or the Route d'Arlon was built in 1790, slightly to the north of the Roman road. It was here that the first houses appeared in Windhof. American troops, liberating Luxembourg in September 1944, proceeded through Windhof towards Arlon along this road which became known as the Voie de la Liberté.

In the 1970s, the Autoroute d'Arlon with an exit just 1 km to the south of Windhof was built. Designated the A6 motorway or European route E25 it links Luxembourg to Brussels and beyond creating excellent facilities for Windhof.

== Windhof today ==
Windhof has now become a rapidly developing, increasingly prosperous centre of business activity. Over 100 small to medium-sized companies employing over 500 people have now been established there in a range of service sectors including information technology and telecommunications, construction, management consulting, warehousing and waste management. There is little recent residential development apart from a few houses on the western side.

Windhof is connected to Luxembourg by regular bus service.

In 2010 a number of local companies founded Ecoparc Windhof, with the purpose to promote the zone. In addition the Ecoparc Windhof has joined an ambitious European research program interreg with Luxembourgish and international partners in order to implement the C2C Cradle-to-cradle design methodology in a development zone.

== See also ==
- List of villages in Luxembourg
