= Roodt-sur-Eisch =

Coordinates: 49°42′N 6°00′E

Roodt (Eisch) (Luxembourgish: Rued, German: Roodt (Eisch)) is a village in the commune of Habscht, in western Luxembourg. As of 2023, the village had a population of 238.
