= Kehlen =

Kehlen Kielen (Luxembourgish)
- Commune
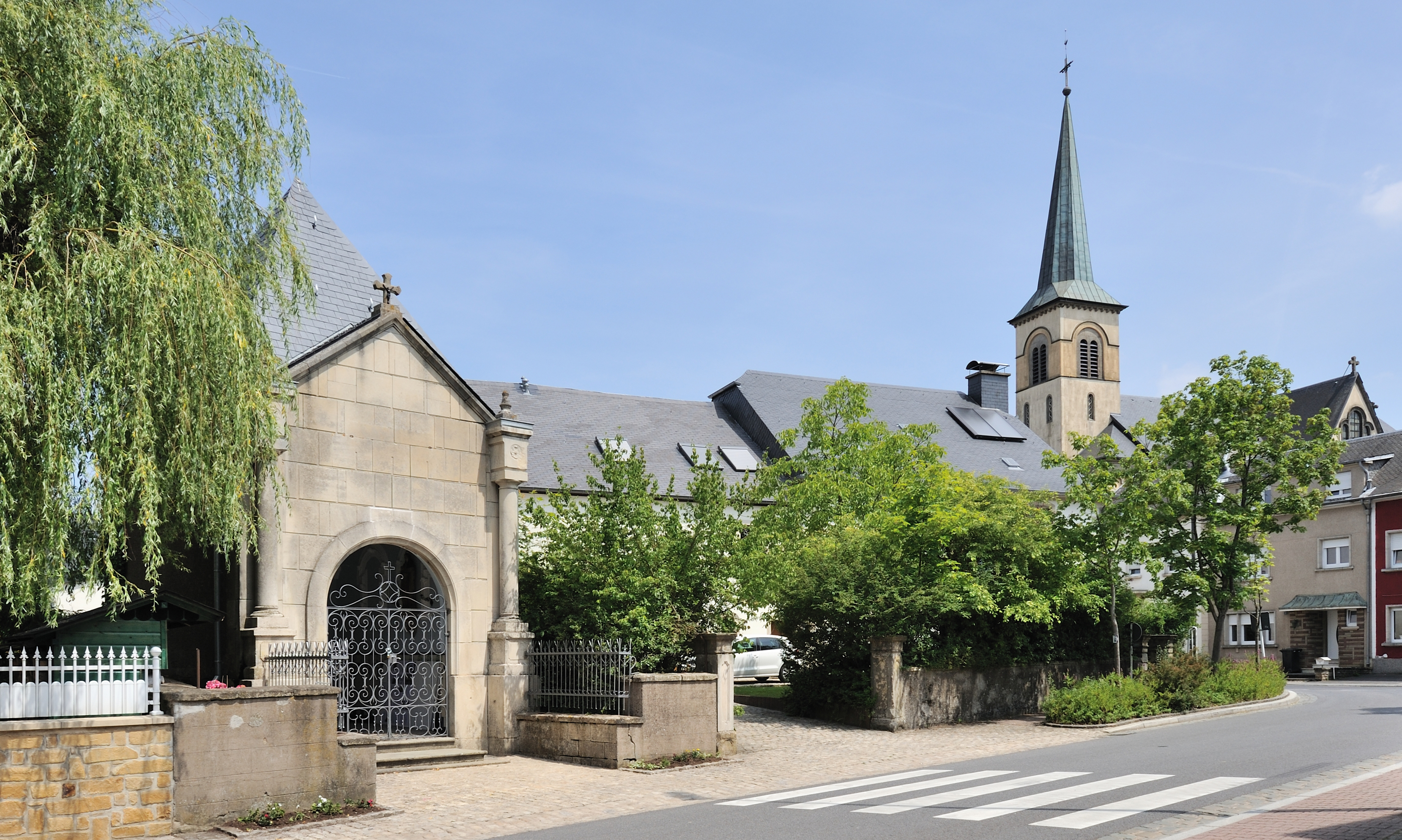
- Kehlen chapel and church

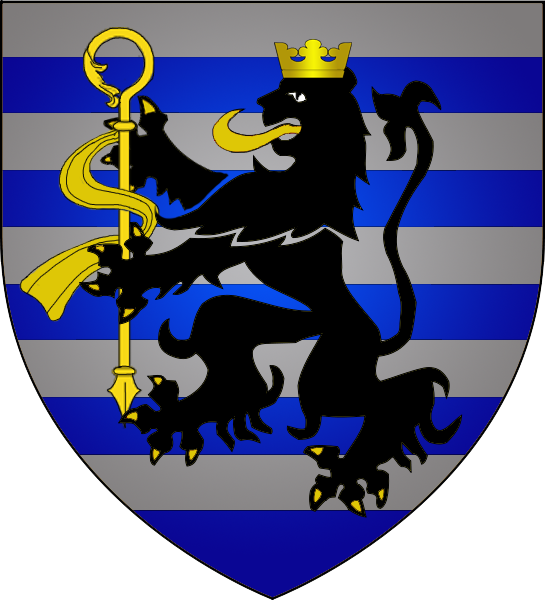
- Coat of arms

- Map of Luxembourg with Kehlen highlighted in orange, and the canton in dark red
- Coordinates: 49.6667°N 6.0333°E
- Country: Luxembourg
- Canton: Capellen

Government
  - Mayor: Félix Eischen

Area
  - Total: 28.18 km^{2} (10.88 sq mi)
  - Rank: 29th of 100
- Highest elevation: 389 m (1,276 ft)
  - Rank: 62nd of 100
- Lowest elevation: 242 m (794 ft)
  - Rank: 51st of 100

Population (2026)
  - Total: 7,681
  - Rank: 23rd of 100
  - Density: 272.6/km^{2} (706.0/sq mi)
  - Rank: 34th of 100
- Time zone: UTC+1 (CET)
  - Summer (DST): UTC+2 (CEST)
- LAU 2: LU0000105
- Website: kehlen.lu

Kehlen ([ˈkeːlən]; Luxembourgish: Kielen [ˈki̯ələn]) is a commune and town in western Luxembourg. It is part of the canton of Capellen. As of 2023, the commune had a population of 6,391.

As of September 2026, the town of Kehlen, which lies in the centre of the commune, has a population of 2,524. Other towns within the commune include Dondelange, Keispelt, Meispelt, Nospelt and Olm.

== History ==
The history of Kehlen goes back at least to Gallo-Roman period. Celtic tombs have been excavated in nearby Nospelt and a necropolis from the 1st century was discovered in the early 1970s on the Juckelsboesch plateau between Mamer and Kehlen. A beautiful dark blue glass bowl was among the offerings found there.

Pedestal to the four gods, Kehlen

A monument to the four gods depicting Juno, Minerva, Mercury and Hercules, possibly once the base of a Jupiter Column, was discovered on the heights of Schoenberg at the point where two Roman roads once crossed. The original is now in the National Museum of History and Art but a replica can be seen beside the entrance to the Schoenberg cemetery.

Schoenberg is one of the oldest parishes in Luxembourg. It came under the authority of the St. Maximin's Abbey, Trier, as far back as 1637. The cemetery is classified as a national monument as many of the gravestones are from the beginning of the 16th century.

Until fairly recently, Kehlen was a farming community with a few cottage industries. Today, owing to its proximity to Luxembourg City (about 25 minutes by car outside the city), most of its inhabitants now work in the service sector.

The name Kehlen is said to originate from Callidovilla meaning the villa of Callidus.

== Population ==
Historical population

Year	Pop.	±%
1821	1,528	—
1851	2,376	+55.5%
1900	2,096	−11.8%
1910	1,972	−5.9%
1922	1,881	−4.6%
1935	1,681	−10.6%

Year	Pop.	±%
1947	1,562	−7.1%
1960	1,629	+4.3%
1970	1,674	+2.8%
1981	2,727	+62.9%
1990	3,970	+45.6%
2000	4,883	+23.0%

Year	Pop.	±%
2005	4,733	−3.1%
2010	4,931	+4.2%
2015	5,375	+9.0%
2020	6,232	+15.9%
2021	6,138	−1.5%

Source data

== Twin towns ==
Kehlen is twinned with:

- Meckenbeuren, Germany
