= Cents, Luxembourg City =

District of Luxembourg City, Luxembourg

Cents Zens (Luxembourgish)
- District
- Cents is one of 24 districts in Luxembourg City
- Country: Luxembourg
- Commune: Luxembourg City

Area
  - Total: 1.7310 km^{2} (0.6683 sq mi)

Population (31 December 2025)
  - Total: 6,618
  - Density: 3,823/km^{2} (9,902/sq mi)

Nationality
  - Luxembourgish: 50.41%
  - Other: 49.59%
- Website: Cents

Cents (German pronunciation: [ˈtsɛnts]; Luxembourgish: Zens, pronounced [tsæns]) is a district in eastern Luxembourg City, in southern Luxembourg.

As of 31 December 2025, the district has a population of 6,618 inhabitants. It is the only district of Luxembourg City where a majority of residents are of Luxembourgish nationality.

The area lies on the eastern side of the city, on an elevated area 60 metres above Clausen and Neudorf.

== History ==
=== Origin and etymology ===
The name Cents probably goes back to a tax, which the tenants of the Fetschenhof and its fields had to pay to the Altmünster Abbey.

In August 1255 Elisabeth, widow of the alderman Walter, had bequeathed 14 morgens of land on the Kuhberg to the nuns of the Abbey of the Holy Ghost in Luxembourg. Forty years later, on 6 Januar 1292 the rich townsman Philip a.k.a. Girardeus gave the Fetschenscheuer and its land to the Altmünster Abbey. This encompassed 80 hectares of land, from the Kuhberg to Cents, and from the cliffs above Clausen and Neudorf to the valley of Hamm (Hammer Dällchen) and down to the Alzette. The land donation was not without its disadvantages: large parts of the hill ridge were still covered in forest. The Fetschenhof and Fetschental (near Pulvermuhl) were difficult to reach from the Abbey, since there was no navigable path up to the hill. Since the suburb had received towers and walls in the 14th century, in times where there was a risk of war, the narrow footpaths to the Fetschental were also walled up. The monks of Altmünster therefore preferred to cultivate their farmyard with its gardens and lawns in Pfaffenthal.

In the cataster of Empress Maria Theresa from 1761-1775, the large manors were described as "Cense". It is probable that the term "Cense" was also used for the entire property of the Fetschenhof at the time.

The Kéibierg connects the Grund and Clausen with the elevation of the Fetschenhof. The name "Kéibierg" is first recorded in a document from 20 December 1506 as Gyersberg, and is later also mentioned as Gyrsberg, Geierspergh, and Gyhersperg. In 1666/67 in the accounts of the Hospital of St. John this had become the Gansberg, and in the cadaster of 1824 it is registered as the Küheberg.

=== Fortress of Luxembourg ===
The plateau of Cents-Fetschenhof was a useful area for any army wishing to attack the Fortress of Luxembourg from the East. Directly in front of the fortress walls, the elevation allowed a wide view over the whole city. In 1683 Marshal François de Créquy started the siege of Luxembourg, on the orders of French King Louis XIV. He set up his permanent camp to the East of the city at Mensdorf, where the name Krékelsbierg is still a reminder of him to this day. From there his troops — 12,000 infantry and cavalry — marched to the rise of Fetschenhof and fired on the city from the Kéibierg.

They fired 6,000 projectiles at the city, causing great destruction. The historian Leo Müller described how citizens of Metz observed "the eerie spectacle of the burning Luxembourg, which was blazing like an almighty torch". Shortly after Christmas, on 27 December 1683, the French marched off. The number of civilian casualties was quite low, but the suffering of the population was severe due to the winter cold. This was made worse by the order of the Governor Chimay, to uncover the houses, in order to decrease the risk of fire. Through the destruction of buildings and the weakened state of the population, it was easy for Marshall de Créqui to take over the city in April 1684 with 35,000. In this siege, the city was devastated by over 50,000 projectiles, and was later fortified by Vauban.

The French did not get to make much use of these extensive fortification works, however: in 1697 they returned Luxembourg to the Spanish. From 1713, when Luxembourg passed over to the Austrians under the Peace of Utrecht, it experienced a more peaceful time for both the fortress and its surrounding area. On 21 November 1794 however, the French again laid siege to the city, this time under the orders of the Directoire. Once again, the attackers made use of the strategic location of the Fetschenhof plateau. In a week, they had constructed the Fetschenhof entrenchment for 2 cannons — a structure which was expanded in April 1795 by six more cannons. While the city itself suffered less damage than under previous sieges, this time it was more the surrounding areas that suffered destruction. The Fetschenhof, for example, went up in flames.

Two months before his coronation as Emperor, Napoleon visited Luxembourg in October 1804. On this occasion, a plan was considered to build a bridge between the Holy Ghost Citadel (now the Plateau of the Holy Ghost) in the upper city, over the Grund sluice, to the Rue de Trèves in Cens. However, further investigation showed that the ground around the Grund sluice was not viable enough to bear such a construction, and the plan was cancelled.

=== Modern history ===
Until 1920, when a commune merger established the modern-day boundaries of Luxembourg City, Cents was part of the commune of Hamm, which had itself been separated from the commune of Sandweiler in 1873.

The district is due to gain a direct connection with Neudorf and the Kirchberg plateau thanks to a bike and pedestrian bridge and elevator, which is due be completed in 2028 despite opposition from some Neudorf residents.

== Luxembourg-Cents ==
The football stadium, known in French as Stade au Cents, is home to Luxembourg City, and has a capacity of 2,800.

== See also ==
- Cents-Hamm railway station
- Siege of Luxembourg (1684)
- Siege of Luxembourg (1794–1795)
