= Rollingergrund =

Coordinates: 49°37′N 6°06′E

Rollingergrund Rollengergronn (Luxembourgish)
- Former commune of Luxembourg
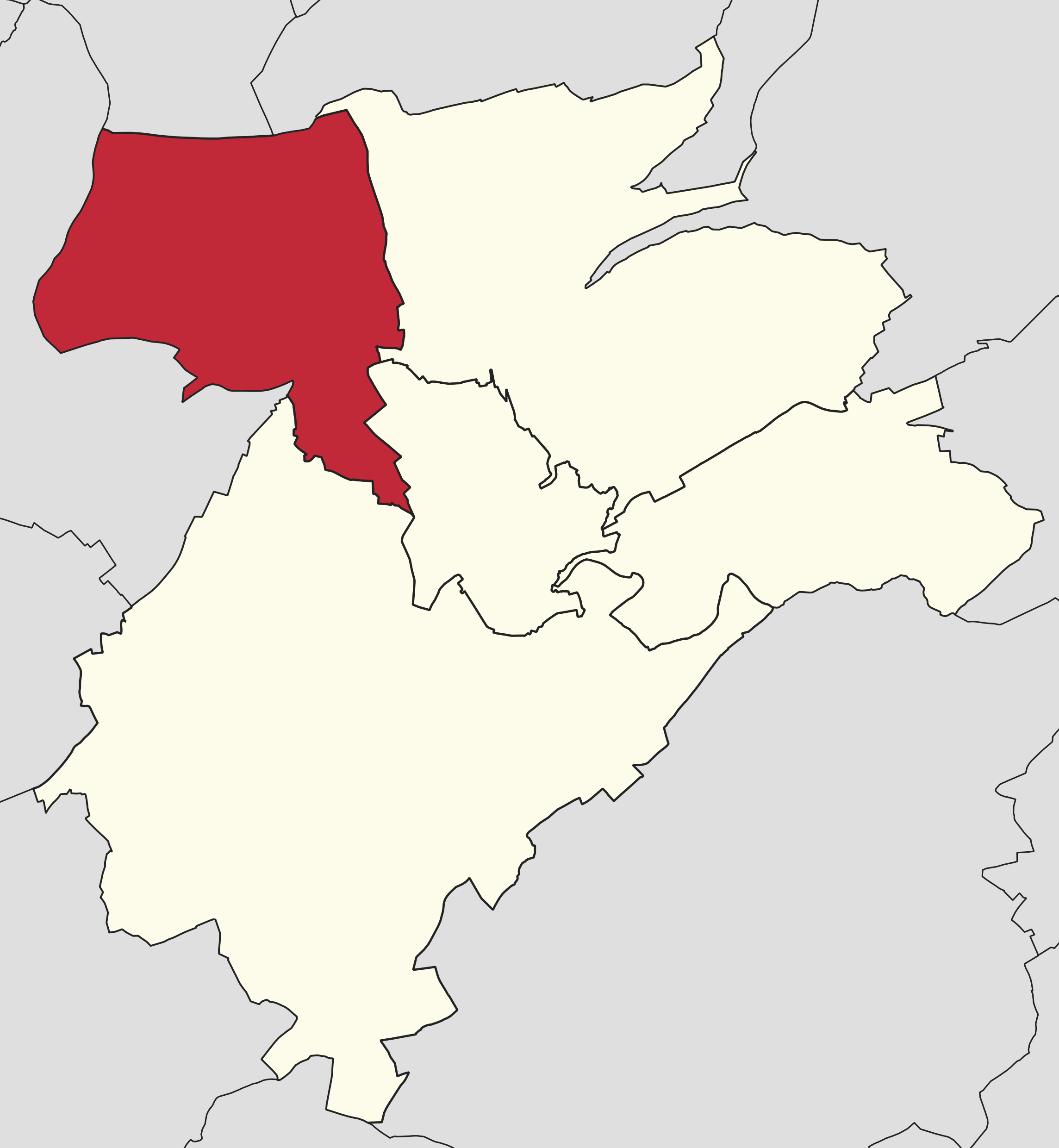
- Map of Luxembourg City before 1920, with the Commune of Rollingergrund highlighted in red
- Country: Luxembourg
- District: Luxembourg
- Canton: Luxembourg
- Created: 8 May 1849
- Abolished: 26 March 1920

Area
  - Total: 7.787 km^{2} (3.007 sq mi)
- Currently: Part of Luxembourg City

Rollingergrund (German pronunciation: [ˈʁɔlɪŋɐˌɡʁʊnt]; Luxembourgish: Rollengergronn, pronounced [ˌʀoleŋɐˈɡʀon]) is an area of north-western Luxembourg City, in southern Luxembourg. It forms the majority of the district of Rollingergrund-North Belair.

Rollingergrund developed around the porcelain factory of Villeroy & Boch. While it originally belonged to Luxembourg City, after the territorial reorganisation under the French regime (1795-1814) it was part of the commune of Eich. After it received its own parish in 1843, the population sought political autonomy, and it became a commune in the canton of Luxembourg from 8 May 1849, when it was split from the commune of Eich. On 26 March 1920 it was again merged into the city of Luxembourg, along with Eich, Hamm and Hollerich.

Michel Engels (1851–1901), the celebrated illustrator, author and art teacher, was born in Rollingergrund.
