= Bonnevoie =

Neighborhood of Luxembourg City

Coordinates: 49°35′41″N 6°08′22″E

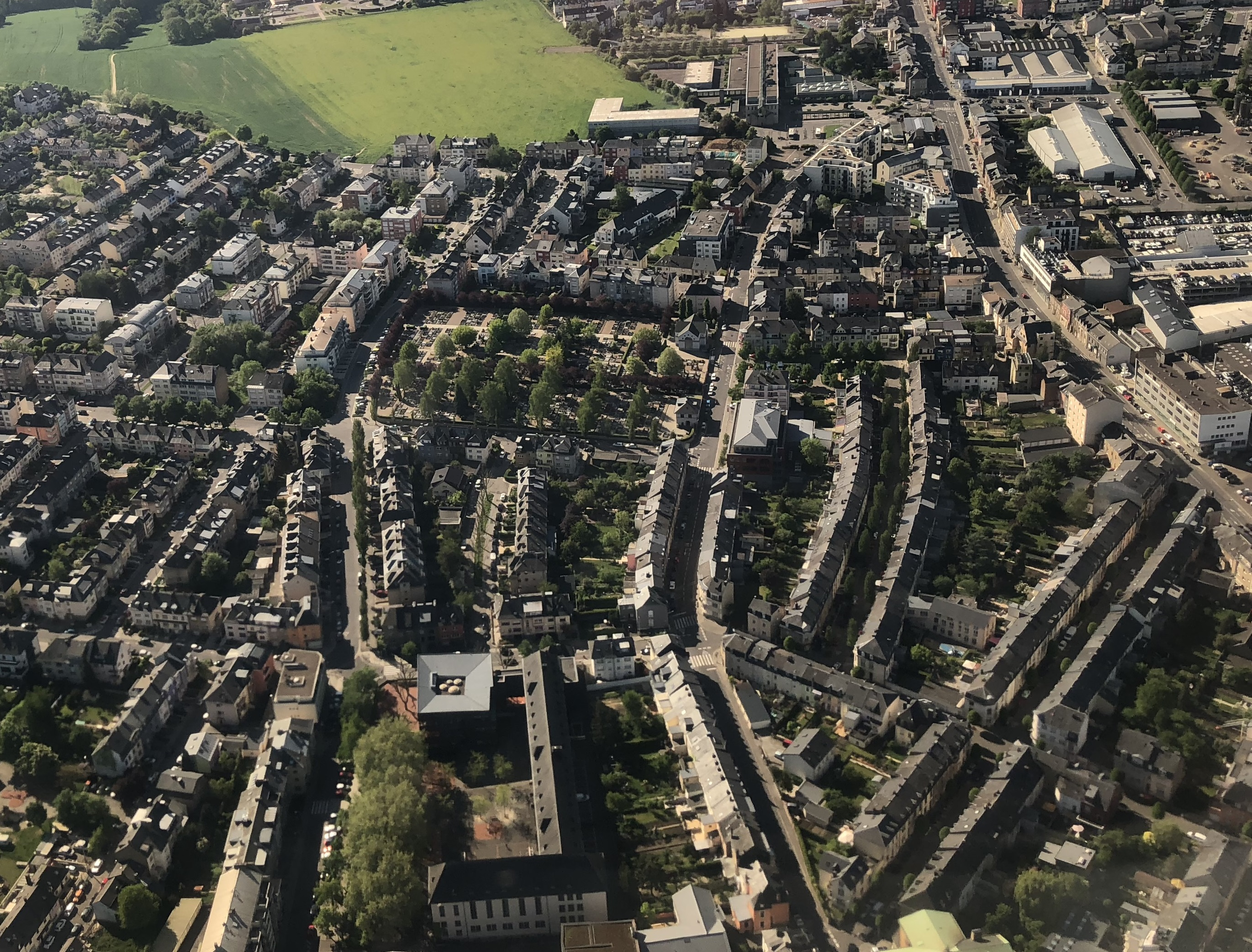
Aerial view of Bonnevoie.

Bonnevoie (French pronunciation: [bɔnvwa]; Luxembourgish: Bouneweg [ˈbəʊ̯nəveːɕ]; German: Bonneweg [ˈbɔnəveːk]) is an area of south-eastern Luxembourg City, in southern Luxembourg. It is divided between the districts of North Bonnevoie-Verlorenkost and South Bonnevoie. It is the largest neighbourhood in the city, with more than 18,000 inhabitants.

Famous people born in, or residents, of Bonnevoie include:

- John E. Dolibois, United States ambassador to Luxembourg
- Hugo Gernsback, editor and science fiction author
- François Hentges, gymnast
- Gabriel Lippmann, French physicist and Nobel Prize laureate (1908)
- Corinne Cahen, Luxembourg Minister of Family and Integration and the Greater Region in the Bettel–Schneider ministry

== History ==
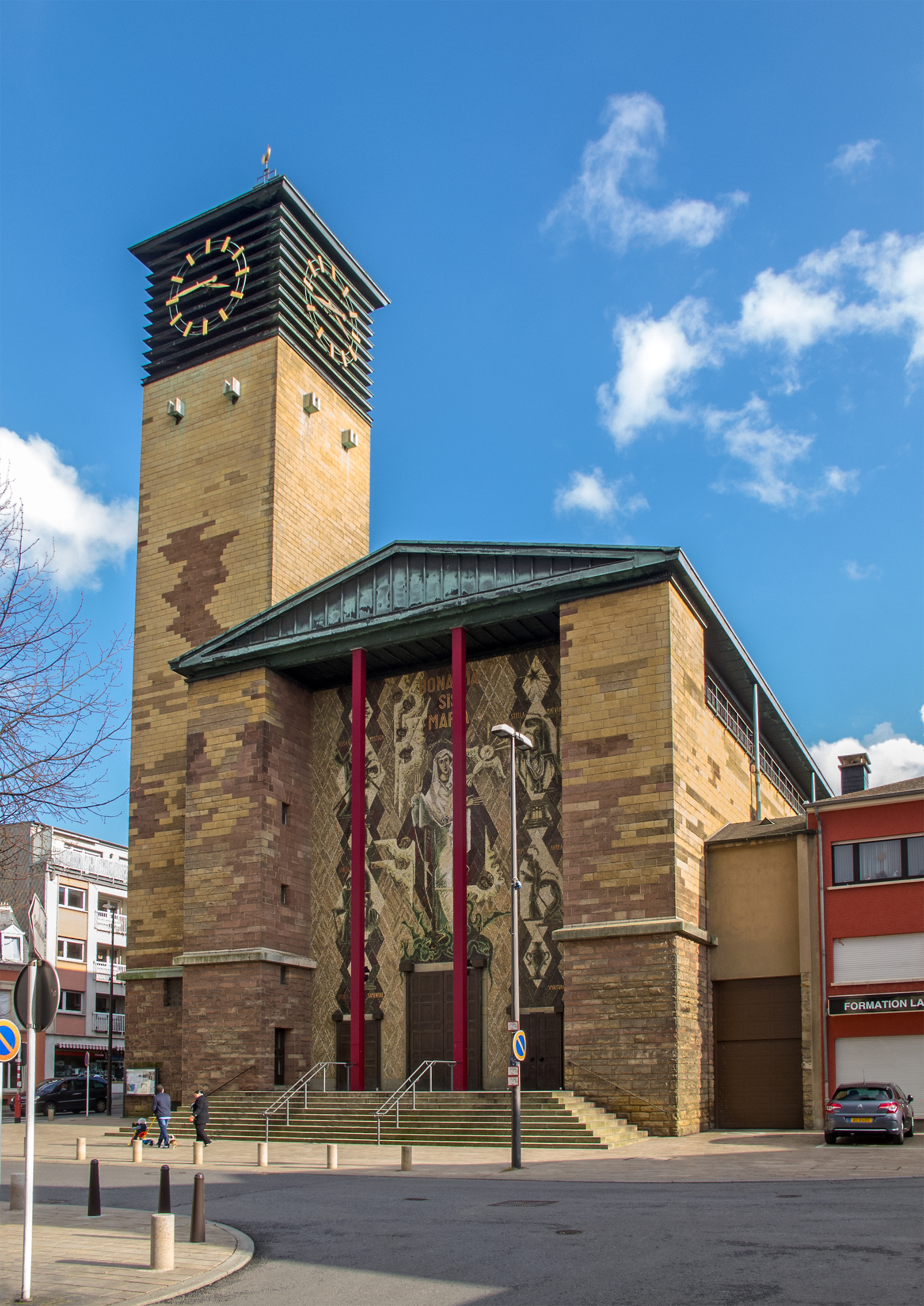
Bonnevoie church ("Our Lady of Peace") on the Place Léon XIII

In the early 1990s, the Luxembourg City decided to radically regenerate the centre of Bonnevoie. The basic idea of the urbanistic concept consisted of redeveloping the city areas which were at this time dominated by car traffic: the three-lane Rue de Bonnevoie and the roundabout on the Place Léon XIII. For traffic reasons, the redevelopment was to take place in two parts. The work of the first phase was finished in 2002.

The centrepiece of the first phase was the Place Léon XIII. The square is aligned with the central nave of the Bonnevoie Church and contains fountains, benches, and trees in the centre of Bonnevoie.

== Churches ==
There is an oral tradition among inhabitants that a chapel or church of Saint Irmina once existed in Bonnevoie. It is not known where this chapel was located, who built it or what its fate was. From visitation reports of the Archdiocese of Trier, it appears that in the 11th century a chapel to Saint Irmina was consecrated in the old parish of Hollerich. It appears that the lepers of the city had settled around this chapel.

Today, Bonnevoie has a church called "Eglise paroissiale".
