= Clausen German war cemetery =

German military cemetery in Luxembourg City

Coordinates: 49°36′55.29″N 6°8′26.57″E

- Deutscher Soldatenfriedhof Clausen
- German War Graves Commission; Volksbund Deutsche Kriegsgräberfürsorge.
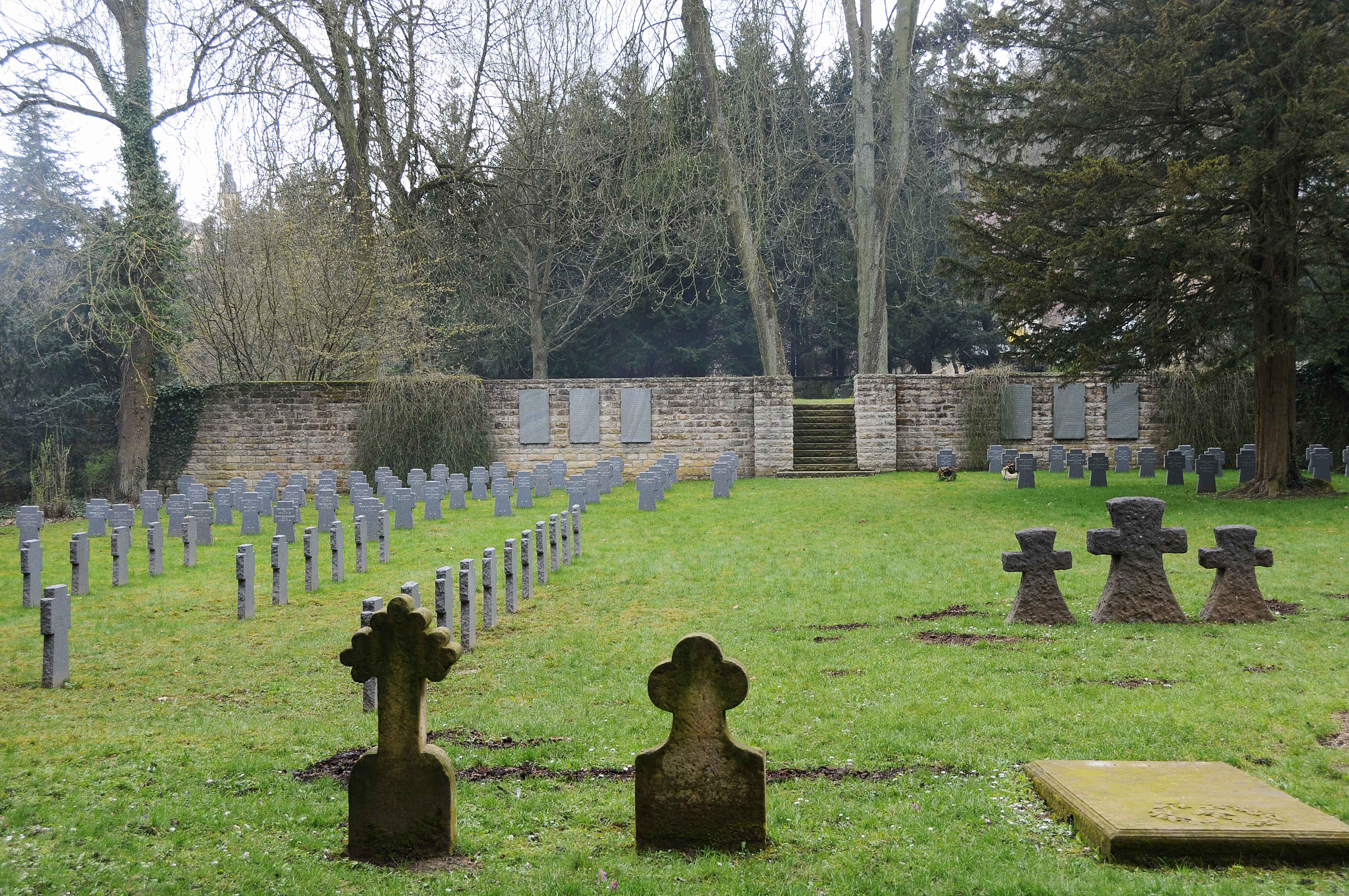
- Used for those deceased 1813–1945
- Established: 1813
- Location: Luxembourg City

Burials by nation
- Germany

Burials by war
- World War I: 196; World War II: 262

The Clausen German war cemetery (Deutscher Soldatenfriedhof Clausen in German) is a German military cemetery in Luxembourg City. The cemetery primarily contains remains from World War I and World War II; however it also contains military remains from the Belgian Revolution, the Prussian garrison located in the city between 1815–1867 and the Franco-Prussian War.

== Description ==
=== 1815–1867 Prussian garrison burials ===
As a consequence of the Congress of Vienna, the newly created Grand Duchy of Luxembourg became part of the German Confederation, and Luxembourg City was placed under shared military control. The military garrison in Luxembourg City was limited to 6,000 troops; with, in theory, three-quarters being Prussian and one-quarter Dutch. A German military contingent remained in Luxembourg City until 1867 when the Treaty of London mandated the demolition of the westward fortifications of Luxembourg City and the withdrawal of the Prussian garrison which had been sited in Luxembourg since 1815 in accordance with the decisions of the Congress of Vienna.

=== World War I and World War II burials ===
During the winter and spring 1945 battles in Luxembourg, the American grave service recovered the remains of German casualties of the Battle of Bulge and buried them in two provisional burial grounds; the Germans in Sandweiler, the Americans in Hamm. Following an agreement reached in 1952 between the Grand Duchy of Luxembourg and the Federal Republic of Germany, German remains from 150 different cemeteries throughout Luxembourg were moved to Sandweiler German war cemetery; however, those in Clausen were left in place.

== Sources ==
- Holborn, Hajo (1982). A History of Modern Germany: 1840–1945. Princeton University Press. pp. 209–. ISBN 0691007977.
- Kaufmann, J.E.; Kaufmann, H.W. (2014). The Forts and Fortifications of Europe 1815–1945: The Central States: Germany, Austria-Hungary and Czechoslovakia. Pen and Sword. ISBN 978-1848848061.
