= Dommeldange =

District of Luxembourg City, Luxembourg

Dommeldange: Dummeldeng (Luxembourgish); Dommeldingen (German)
- District
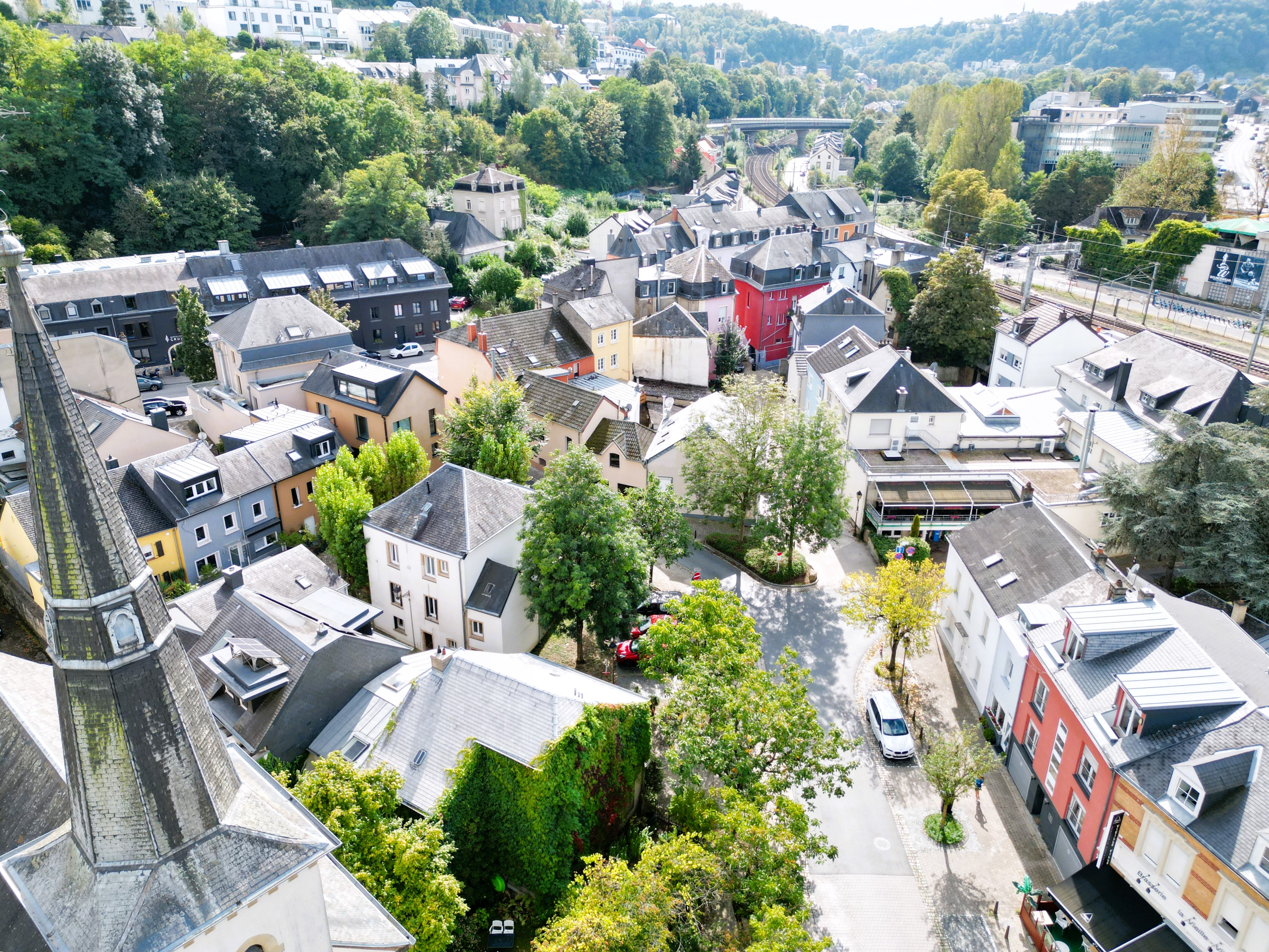

- Dommeldange is one of 24 districts in Luxembourg City
- Country: Luxembourg
- Commune: Luxembourg City

Area
  - Total: 2.3556 km^{2} (0.9095 sq mi)

Population (31 December 2025)
  - Total: 3,106
  - Density: 1,319/km^{2} (3,415/sq mi)

Nationality
  - Luxembourgish: 27.30%
  - Other: 72.70%
- Website: Dommeldange

Dommeldange (French pronunciation: [dɔmɛldɑ̃ʒ]; Luxembourgish: Dummeldeng [ˈduməldeŋ]; German: Dommeldingen [ˈdɔml̩ˌdɪŋən]) is a district in north-eastern Luxembourg City, in southern Luxembourg.

As of 31 December 2025, the district has a population of 3,106 inhabitants.

== Steel works ==
Since the 17th century, Dommeldange was a metal production site under the Ancien Régime, using charcoal from the nearby Grünewald and obtaining ore from sediment deposits from surrounding lands, which were heated in kilns.

From 1845, the Metz family of businessmen and industrialists, started to set up blast furnaces and foundries in the neighbouring district of Eich, where they were to experiment with using coke and oolite iron ore with a high phosphorus content, known as minette. The mining and use of minette in the south of the country soared in the 1850s and gave the works in Eich an upturn. However, the route finally chosen for the construction of the northern railway line in the late 1850s would change the circumstances for the Eich works. Rather than passing via Septfontaines and Muhlenbach, as originally planned, it went via the right bank of the Alzette river. The Prussian military authorities had insisted that the railway station be constructed on the Bonnevoie plateau, within reach of the fortress's cannons.

Considering the connection to the railway to be indispensable to the profitable running of a cast-iron works, Norbert Metz decided to build a new factory immediately by the Dommeldange station, between the railway track and the Alzette.

To this effect, the Metz family on 24 August 1865 established a partnership limited by shares with an initial capital of 5 million francs, named "Forges d’Eich, Metz & Cie". The fact that the forge masters had access to an experienced workforce, inhabiting the nearby areas of Weimerskirch, Beggen, Walferdange, Eich and Muhlenbach, was probably helpful in the decision to establish the works in Dommeldange rather than Esch-sur-Alzette.

"Forges d’Eich, Metz & Cie" decided, in an extraordinary general meeting in January 1866, to initially build two blast furnaces that used coke in Dommeldange. These processed minette from Esch, Rumelange and Kayl, that was brought in by rail. the daily output was 40-50 tonnes of raw iron. Already in December 1868, two further blast furnaces were made operational, which more than doubled the daily output. In their first years of operation, they produced around 78,000 tonnes of cast iron, a considerable amount at the time. Dommeldange's iron was brought to market mostly in the industrial area of Charleroi, the Saarland and the Rhineland. The Dommeldange factory generated substantial profits in the years 1868–1873, which allowed the Metz & Cie directors to finance the construction of a second large iron works, this time in the heart of the mining basin, in Esch-sur-Alzette. This also had four blast furnaces using coke, and was built from 1870 in partnership with the Tesch family, who were business partners of the Metz family. In order to assure the operation of the Esch works, numerous foremen and foundrymen were transferred from Dommeldange to Esch.

After the panic of 1873 and the ensuing depression, it seemed that the rise of the Luxembourgish steel industry was hampered by the impossibility of transforming cast iron made of oolite ore into steel, using the Bessemer process, and of ensuring a reliable mass production. The high phosphorus content of minette caused problems, a technical difficulty which risked becoming a question of life and death for the steel industry of Luxembourg and Lorraine. It is therefore not surprising that the forge master Emile Metz and his chief chemist, Jean Meyer, were among the first European steel producers to acquire, in April 1879, a licence for Metz & Cie to use the patent by the British inventor Sidney Gilchrist Thomas for a method to dephosphorise cast iron, as soon as the news of its invention became known in Europe. Together with the inventor and with the German metallurgist Joseph Massenez, Jean Meyer, chief scientist at the Dommeldange works, subsequently proceeded to empirically analyse the first tests of the Thomas procedure in Europe. It was for this reason that Sidney Gilchrist Thomas came to Dommeldange several times during 1879–1881 to meet with Jean Meyer. It was also at the Dommeldange works that Meyer did the first tests of mixing iron ore with a view to the production of different qualities of Thomas cast iron in a blast furnace.

While Metz & Cie had a licence for the Thomas patent, the company would have needed a steelworks to use the new procedure. In the years 1879–1882, the question then posed itself to the directors of Metz & Cie of what location seemed best-suited for this. The question was whether to build a steelworks using the Thomas procedure next to the Dommeldange blast furnaces, or rather to set up a facility in immediate proximity to the iron ore mines of the mining basin. Dommeldange was considered for a time, but was discarded as an option due to the transportation costs of shipping the iron ore. It also turned out that there were legal constraints that hindered the Esch-Schifflange option. In the end, the directors of Metz & Cie opted to establish a new works in Dudelange, with Jean Meyer, the chief chemist at Dommeldange, as its manager. The foundation of the Hauts Fourneaux et Forges de Dudelange ("Blast Furnaces and Foundries of Dudelange") in 1882 brought about the construction of the first large integrated works comprising blast furnaces, a Thomas steelworks and rolling mills. For the first time, the realisation of Metz & Cie's strategic development goals had turned out to the detriment of Dommeldange.

20 years later, the steelworks of Dommeldange again faced a major challenge. The focus on powerful gas-powered machines in blast furnaces, at the turn of the 19th/20th century, would revolutionise technology in steel production. While the gases emitted by blast furnaces had hitherto been lost in the atmosphere, their rational use for energy production made it possible to electrically power a variety of motors and production works. The future belonged to large integrated factories with a closed electric circuit. Without a steelworks or rolling mills, the question of the future of Dommeldange's cast iron works became all the more urgent since the sales price of cast iron showed a long-term downward trend.

The goals of the decisive redevelopment of the steelworks of Dommeldange, implemented after the turn of the century by the engineer Emile Bian, were therefore the specialisation of the manufacturing process and the modernisation of the production works. In 1901 the two old blast furnaces I and II were demolished and replaced by a new blast furnace with a production capacity of 100 tonnes per day. In terms of using the gases from the blast furnaces, two gas plants with electricity generators were established in 1904 and 1907. The surplus of electricity was then sold by a supply contract to the city of Luxembourg, in the form of alternating current with a tension of 5000 volts. Finally and above all, it was decided to establish an electric steelworks and to re-orient production towards special forms of steel.

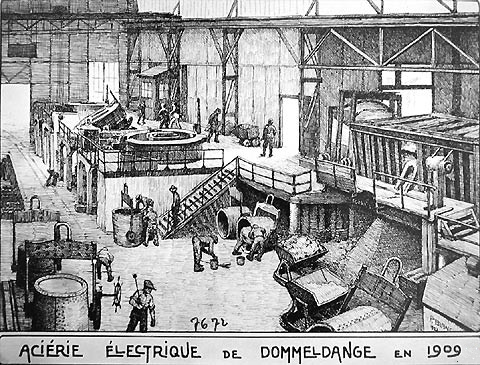
Drawing of the electric steelworks of Dommeldange, 1909

In the early 20th century, electro-metallurgy was still in its infancy, and the works of Dommeldange should be regarded as one of the pioneering works of electro-metallurgy in Europe. After having performed tests in an induction oven of the Röchling-Rodenhauser type, adapted from the prototype developed by the Swede Mr Kjellin, the directors of the factory proceeded in 1908 to establish two tilting furnaces on the Martin model, as a first refinement of the Thomas cast iron, as well as four electric induction furnaces. Electric steel production lent itself to the manufacture of very pure steel, with a high degree of tenacity. With alloys of nickel, chrome, molybdenum, cobalt, or vanadium, one could obtain different qualities of steel with high durability, increasing the breaking point. These fine steels were particularly suited to the production of machine tools and were used in mechanical construction, the automobile industry, aeronautics and the arms industry. At the Dommeldange works the electrically produced steel was cast into bars, or taken to the steel foundry where moulded pieces were produced.

== Sources ==
- Kirps, Georges (1992). "Luxemburger Industriegeschichte: Gründerjahre in Eich und Dommeldingen" (PDF). ons stad (in German) (41): 14–16.
- Maas, Jacques (2021). "L'usine sidérurgique de Dommeldange, une forge pionnière aux portes de la ville de Luxembourg" (PDF). ons stad (in French) (123): 45–50.
