= Siege of Luxembourg (1684) =

Siege during the War of the Reunions

- Part of the War of the Reunions
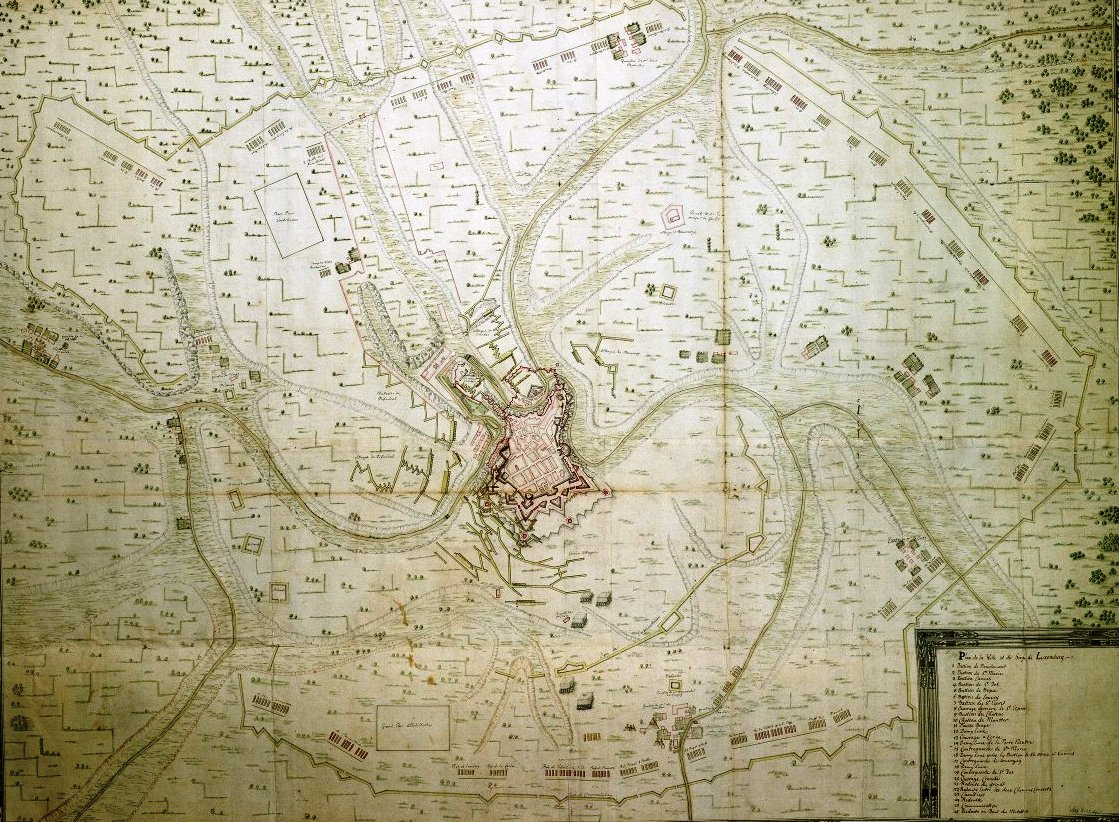
- Military plan for the Siege of Luxembourg.
| Date | 27 April – 7 June 1684 |
| Location | Luxembourg, Spanish Netherlands 49.61°N 6.13°E |
| Result | French victory |

Belligerents
| (Kingdom of France) France | Spain |

Commanders and leaders
| (Kingdom of France) François de Créquy (Kingdom of France) Sébastien Le Prestre de Vauban | (Spain) Ernesto de Croy Ligne, Prince of Chimay (Spain) Alberto Octavio Tserclaes de Tilly |

Strength
| 20,000 men 7,000 horses 82 guns 21 mortars | 4,090 men 600 horses 600 city's militia |

Casualties and losses
| 8,000 | 2,700 |

The siege of Luxembourg, in which Louis XIV of France (husband of Maria Theresa of Spain) laid siege to the Spanish-controlled Fortress of Luxembourg from 27 April to 7 June 1684, was the most significant confrontation of the War of the Reunions between France and Spain. The action caused alarm among France's neighbours and resulted in the formation of the League of Augsburg in 1686. In the ensuing war France was forced to give up the duchy, which was returned to the Habsburgs by the Treaty of Ryswick in 1697.

== Background ==
An important element of Louis XIV's policy of reunion was to the gain the strategically important city of Luxembourg, which was under Spanish rule, but belonged de jure to the Holy Roman Empire. The city had been besieged in 1681-1682, and the inhabitants endured great hardship. This attempt was broken off, but the country was occupied.

Louis started the War of the Reunions especially to conquer Luxembourg in 1683. In December of that year, Luxembourg was bombarded with mortars. About 6,000 bombs and grenades were fired.

In those days, the Fortress of Luxembourg did not have modern fortifications, but was instead protected by its geographic location. Unlike the city, much of which was destroyed by the previous year's bombardment, the defensive works were in good condition.

== Siege ==
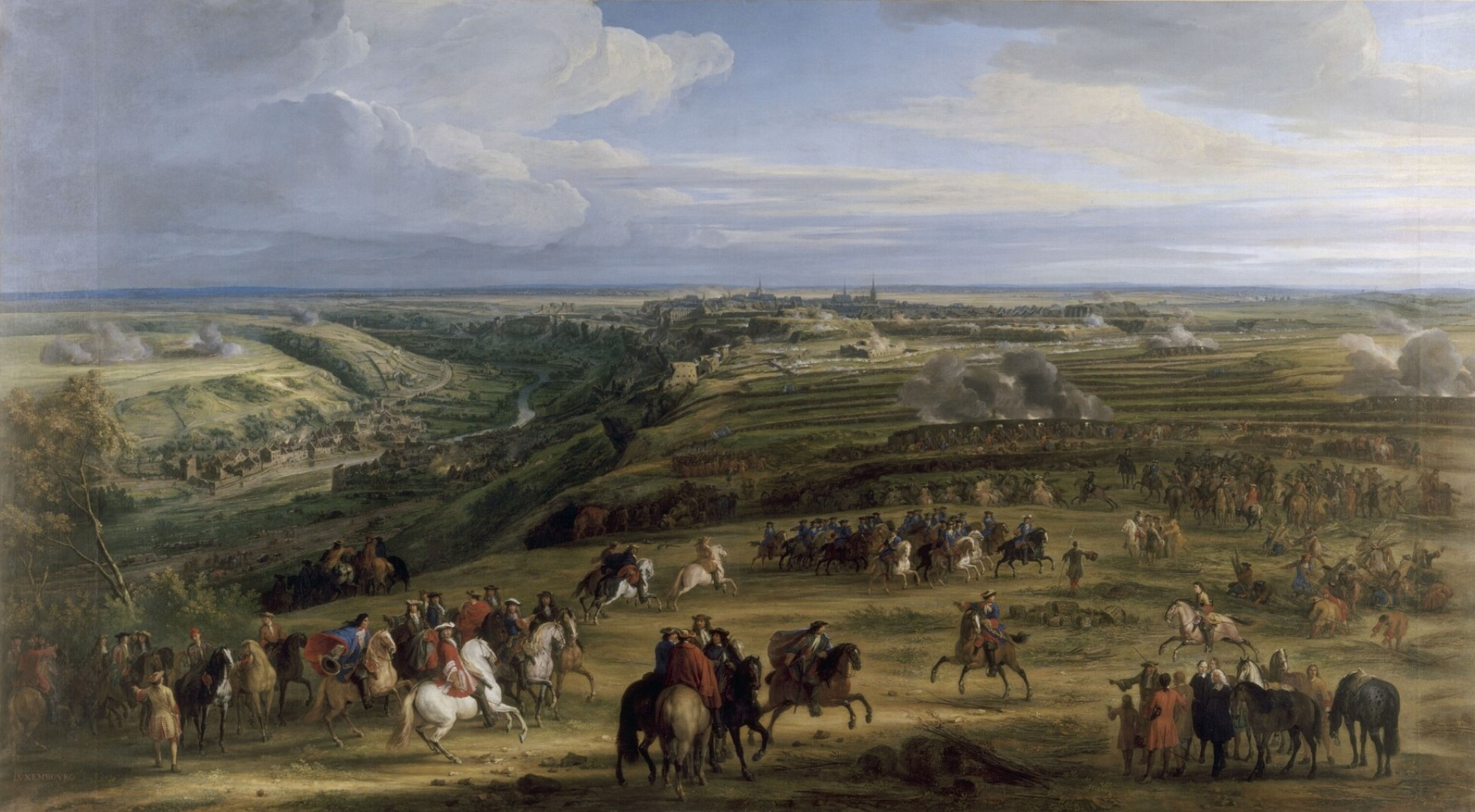
The capture of Luxembourg in June 1684.

=== Preparations ===
In January 1684, the French Marshal François de Créquy succeeded in cutting Luxembourg off from the main Spanish army. An army of 20,000 was posted between Brussels and Luxembourg, in order to distract the enemy troops from the actual objective. Sébastien Le Prestre de Vauban was in command of the siege of Luxembourg.

The French troops numbered 25,000 men, and had more than 70 guns. Their forces included a group of 40 military engineers. The Spanish troops in the city were commanded by the Prince de Chimay and the Comte de Tille. They included about 4,090 men and 600 horses. They were complemented by 600 residents, who had volunteered. The city and fortress lacked provisions and ammunition.

In the weeks before the siege, Marshal Créquy, wanting to conceal his intentions about Luxembourg for as long as possible, had gathered his troops in quarters that were widely dispersed: Verdun, Longwy, Thionville, Arlon, Echternach, and Grevenmacher.

During their blockade of 1681-1683, the French had made use of their prolonged presence by undertaking reconnaissance of the fortification works. From his arrival, Vauban himself undertook an exhaustive reconnaissance for several days, during which he advanced up to the counterscarp, signaling to the Spanish soldiers not to fire on him; the defending soldiers, assuming he was on their side, left him unscathed.

=== Attack ===
The fortress was surrounded by French troops on 28 April, taking the advantage of surprise. The siege started when camps and defensive positions were built around the city from 29 April to 7 May, in order to protect the besieging army; these were lines of contravallation and circumvallation. About 12,000 workers were used, including conscripted farmers. Workers were also brought in from the areas of Metz, Toul and Verdun.

As part of their encampments, the French constructed a field hospital in Alzingen to the south of the fortress. The French food supply centre for the siege was in Metz. Artillery pieces were transported by river via the Moselle from Metz to Grevenmacher, and then continuing by road. The empty boats returned to Nancy, to be loaded there with hay and oats. Road transports went via Cattenom, Gavisse and Hesperange.

The defenders attempted to hinder the work as much as possible. On 1 May there was a major sortie: the workers in the area of the attack were driven off and the defences destroyed, before a counter-attack forced the Spanish to return to the fortress.

As the main point of attack, Vauban chose the Front of the plain (New Gate front), attacking from Limpertsberg. Furthermore, two additional points of attack and several feint attacks were planned. One additional point of attack led via the Neumunster Plateau up the Bock, the other from Cents down to the Wenceslas Wall. From early May, the actual siege trenches were dug. With the help of sap trenches, Vauban approached the fortress in two locations. The closest Front was still half a gunshot away from the covered passages of the city. Both points of attack were linked through a connecting trench. The French set up four batteries for the siege artillery, which were aimed at the main point of attack. Along with normal guns, mortars were used. In the night of 8 May, the cannons started firing on the city. The defenders reacted on 9 May with several sorties and destroyed several offensive buildings, but could not stop the construction work. On 11 May the besiegers were within 30 steps of the closest covered passage of the fortress. Three parallels connected the trenches. Additional gun batteries were brought in. At other locations, the trenches were also nearing the city.

From the 14 May, both sides started a mine war, while above ground the attackers were exposed more and more to the fire of the defenders. The latter dug tunnels to undermine the offensive positions and allowed these to collapse. The besiegers especially came under fire from the redoubts, which therefore became the main target of the guns. On 18 May the French gained entry to one of the partly underground passages of Redoubt Mary, and embittered close combat ensued. The next day, the French expelled the defenders from the redoubt. The Spanish had prepared to blow up the position before leaving, but this failed.

After Redoubt Berlaimont came under heavy fire for three days, this too was evacuated by the Spanish in the night of 21 May. The attackers now had the entire covered passage under their control, and could now move their guns close to the city. From 24 May, the fortifications in the main area of attack came under massive gun and mortar fire. On 25 May the Spanish were driven out of the interior covered passage after heavy fighting. A mine detonated by them killed many attackers.

French sappers started to undermine the walls and to damage them through underground explosions. Thus, on 27 May the Counter-Guard Barlaimont was damaged and then stormed by French troops. They were repulsed later, but managed to blow up the position. On 29 and 30 May the Spanish withdrew from further posts which had become indefensible. Meanwhile, the French miners continued working. On 31 May the defending troops were withdrawn to the main wall. Bastion Barlaimont was also in danger of being taken by an attack after the work by French miners.

=== Surrender ===
The governor of the fortress convened a council of war. As there was no hope of a relief army and he feared pillages and massacres in the city after a takeover, he started to negotiate a surrender. These negotiations did not bring results, and the gun fire from both sides became heavier than ever. In the smaller sites of the siege, especially in the area of the castle, the attackers were making breaches. In the end it was clear to the defenders that they could not hold out. On 3 June they raised a white flag and asked for negotiations. Both sides ceased fire, and soon negotiated an honourable surrender. The surrender of the Spanish garrison was signed in the French headquarters in Merl that day.

Four days later, the garrison was allowed to leave the city with 1,300 to 2,000 surviving soldiers (according to different sources) with their horses and weaponry.

The rather short duration of the siege was partly due to the blockade of almost three years (August 1681 - April 1684) and the intensive bombardment of 22-25 December 1683. Two mortar batteries constructed by the French on the Kuhberg/Kéibierg (Trier Front) fired 2,827 bombs into the city. The few guns of the garrison that retaliated had been rapidly silenced. During the bombardment, dragoons had set fire to the lower city area of Pfaffenthal and the mills on the Alzette.

== Consequences ==
During the siege, the French artillery bombarded the city day and night with more than 55,000 shots. The garrison suffered more than 2,700 casualties (dead, wounded and sick). Out of the city volunteers, 80 died. The French suffered losses of 8,000 men. The siege not only took many casualties, but was also expensive, costing 373,000 Livres.

After the city was captured, the French marched to Trier, where they took the city and destroyed the fortifications. After this they marched into the Electorate of Cologne, with the approval of its ruler.

After taking Luxembourg, Louis XIV had attained his war aim, and now sought peace, successfully. Vauban immediately started on plans to rebuild and enlarge the fortifications of the Fortress of Luxembourg. His plans for doing so were already signed off by Lous XIV on 14 July 1684. Work was started immediately, and lasted 3 years. These were inspected by Louis XIV himself from 21-26 May 1687.

The conquest of Luxembourg opened the way for French rule over the southern parts of the Low Countries.

== See also ==
- French military history
