= Cents-Neudorf-Weimershof bridge and elevator =

Bridge and elevator under construction in Luxembourg City, Luxembourg

- Visual of the projected bridge and elevator tower
- Coordinates: 49°37′10″N 6°9′24″E
- Carries: Pedestrians and bicycles
- Crosses: Neudorf
- Locale: Luxembourg City

Characteristics
- Design: Suspension bridge
- Total length: 202 m (663 ft)
- Width: 6 m (20 ft)
- Clearance below: 53 m (174 ft)

History
- Construction start: February 2025
- Construction end: 2028 (planned)

Location
- Interactive map of Cents-Neudorf-Weimershof bridge and elevator

The Cents-Neudorf-Weimershof bridge is a pedestrian and cycle bridge under construction in Luxembourg City, Luxembourg. It will link the districts of Cents and Weimershof – and, by extension, the district of Kirchberg – by spanning the small valley in which the neighbourhood of Neudorf is situated. It will be connected to Neudorf via a public elevator, which will become the third of its kind in Luxembourg City, following those in Grund and Pfaffenthal.

After having been proposed as early as 2004, construction on the bridge began in April 2025 and is due to be completed in spring 2028.

== Description ==
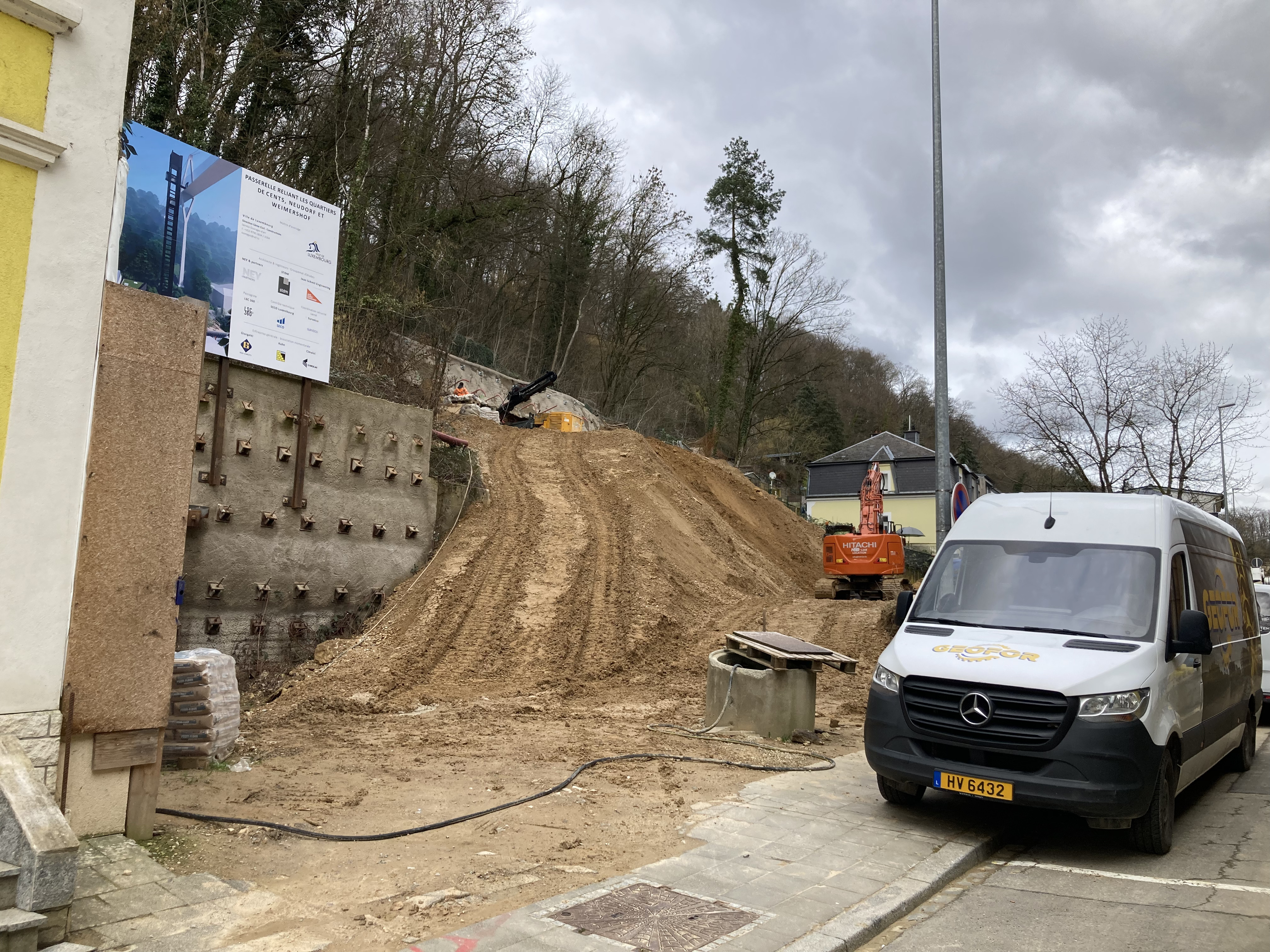
Preliminary works on the site of the former nursery school in February 2026

The bridge will stretch from Rue des Bleuets in Weimershof – close to d'Coque in Kirchberg – to Rue Tawioun in Cents, spanning a distance of 202 metres (663 ft), 53 metres (174 ft) above Rue de Neudorf, and will be supported by a 72 metres (236 ft) tall central pier.

Access from Neudorf will be provided via a panoramic elevator installed in a 60 metres (200 ft) high tower, similar to the one linking Pfaffenthal to Ville-Haute since 2016; both projects were designed by architect Nico Steinmetz. The entrance to the elevator in Neudorf will be made through a forecourt that will built on the site of the neighbourhood's former nursery school, which was demolished for this purpose in November 2021.

== History ==
The bridge project was first put forward by Luxembourg City authorities in November 2004. Planning began in 2008 with the presentation of the bridge's first proposed design, which was to have been situated near the Neudorf church. In 2009, it was abandoned, being deemed too large. The second design, presented in April 2015, was situated further away from the centre of Neudorf and relied on just four pillars, and was estimated to cost 11 million euros.

As this second design was criticised for its appearance and projected ecological impact, city authorities presented a third design in July 2017, conceived by architect Nico Steinmetz, situated on the same site but shortened and with a lighter footprint. The bridge was included in the 2022 city budget; its projected cost was 24.1 million euros, with completion scheduled for June 2025.

At the time of the project's approval by the Ministry of the Environment in February 2023, work was scheduled to begin before the end of that same year – but groundbreaking was persistently delayed, as the construction permit was not signed until February 2024. In October 2024, the budget allocated for the bridge's construction was revised to 40 million euros, a 66% increase, including 7 million for the lift alone – the council of aldermen attributed the rise in construction costs to rising steel prices. Work finally began in April 2025, and the bridge and elevator and are due to be completed in spring 2028.

== Opposition and criticism ==
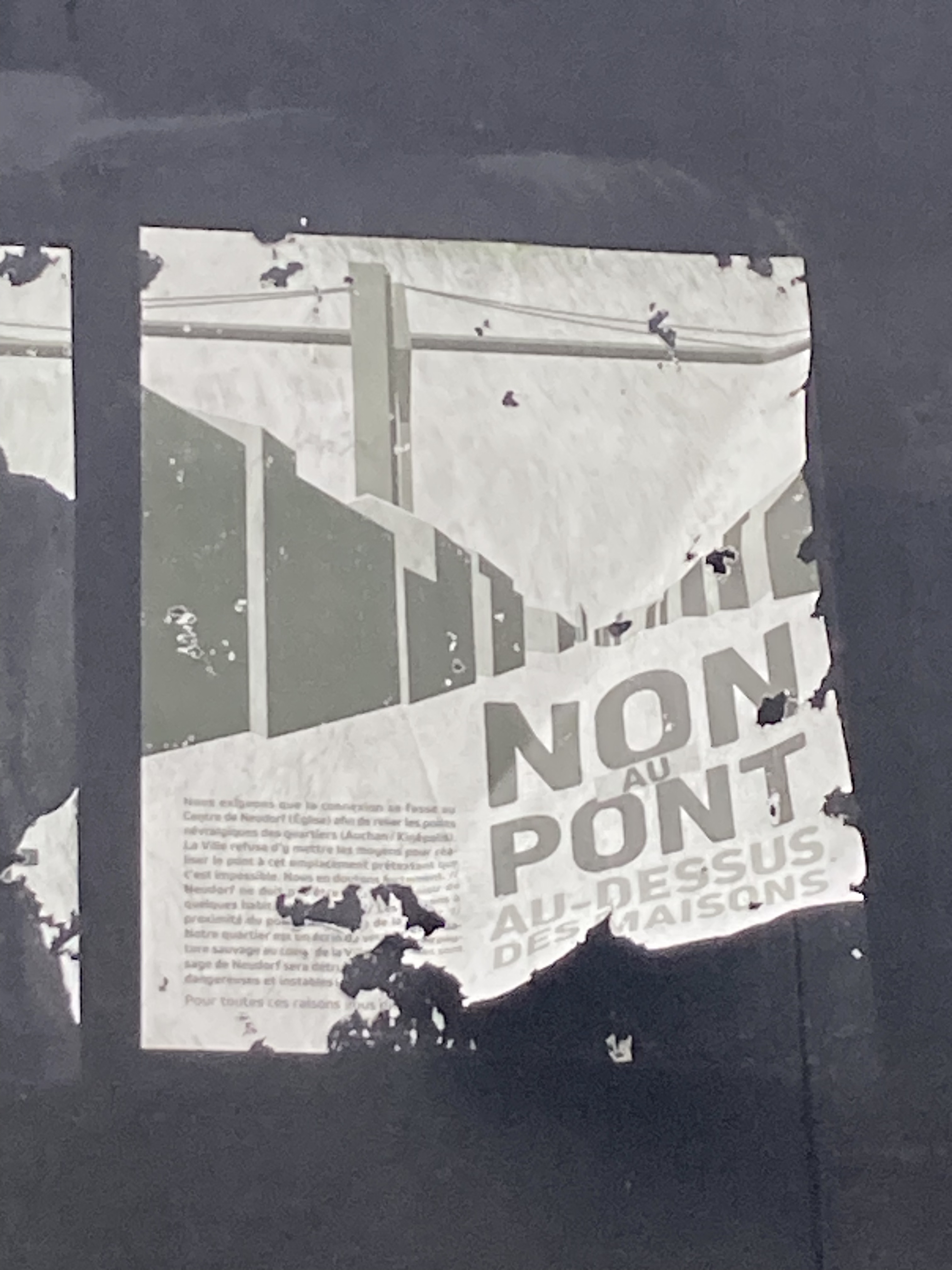
Anti-bridge poster in Neudorf

Since 2007, the project has been the subject of opposition from a number of residents of Neudorf, organized through a local interest group, and, to a lesser extent, residents of Cents and Weimershof. Over the years, they have lodged several appeals and petitions, including an appeal to the Luxembourg Administrative Tribunal in May 2023 highlighting the project's potential environmental impact, most notably because of the felling of a number of trees. In 2015, Roger Braun, the group's chairman, criticised the second version of the bridge, stating that “not a single person in Neudorf wants this bridge”. Nearly ten years later, he expressed fears that the project would “ruin” the neighbourhood and lead to a decrease in property value.

Beyond the location and direct impact of the bridge, the project's cost has also been criticized: the scale of its budget, which almost quadrupled between the initial estimates and the start of construction, has led to it being described as a “luxury object”.

The Neudorf interest group has proposed several alternatives, such as the creation of two lifts on either side of the valley, a gondola, or an alternative route running alongside the A1 motorway to reach Kirchberg at Luxexpo. The final project has, however, received the approval of ProVelo, a Luxembourgish association working to promote cycling, which has welcomed its potential to create a link between four neighbourhoods and to fill a gap.
