= Sandweiler German war cemetery =

WWII Battle of the Bulge cemetery in Luxembourg

- German War Graves Commission (Volksbund Deutsche Kriegsgräberfürsorge)
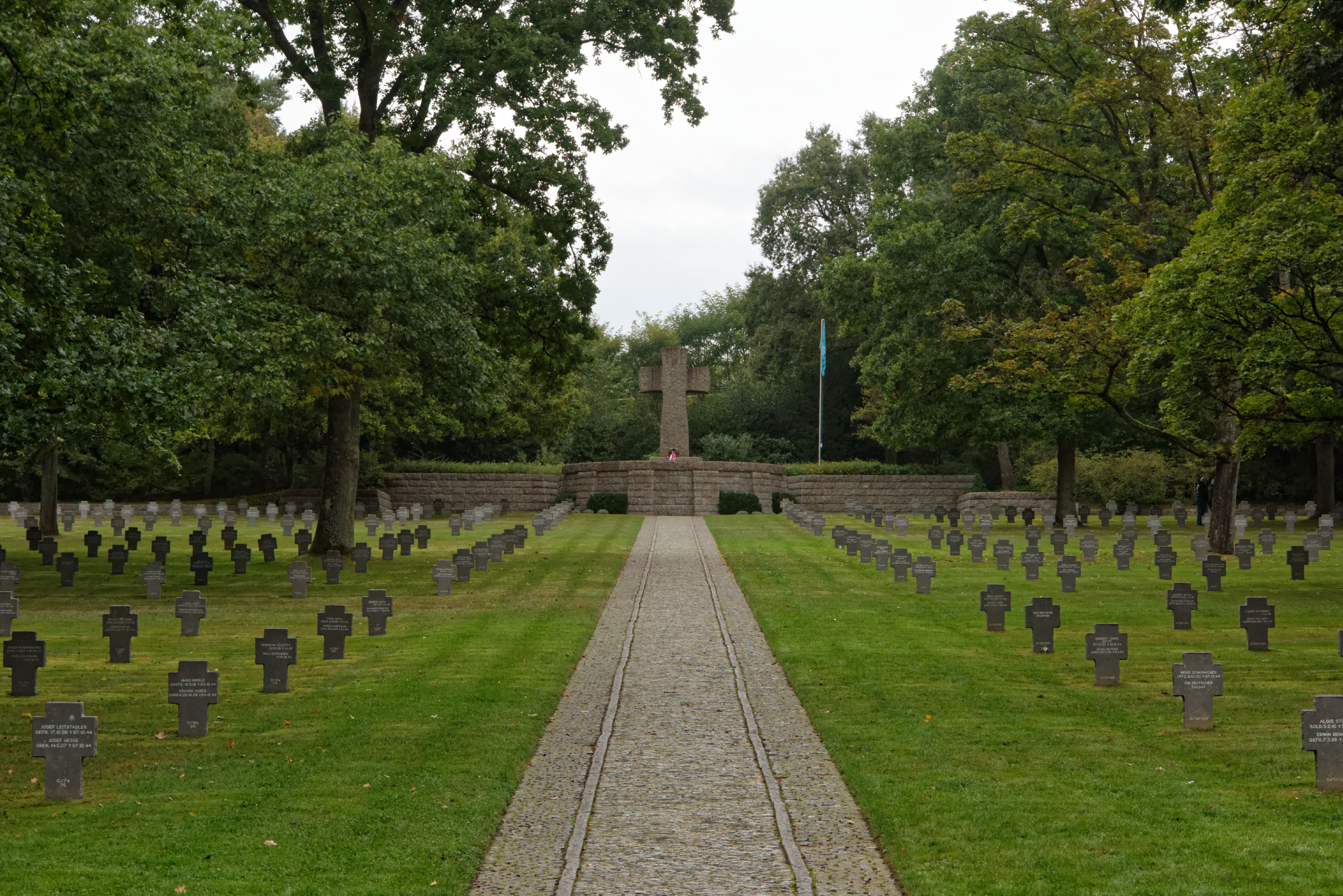
- Used for those deceased 1944 – 1945
- Unveiled: 5 June 1955
- Location: 49°36′34″N 06°12′20″E near Sandweiler, Luxembourg
- Total burials: 10,913

Burials by nation
- * Germany: 10,913

Burials by war
- * World War II: 10,913

The Sandweiler German war cemetery is a World War II cemetery in Sandweiler, in southern Luxembourg. It contains the graves of 10,913 German servicemen from the Battle of the Bulge in the winter of 1944 and the spring of 1945. Of these, 5,599 were buried by the American war graves service during the war; American casualties were buried at the Luxembourg American Cemetery and Memorial about 1.5 kilometres (0.93 mi) away in Hamm.

Following an agreement reached in 1952 between the Grand Duchy of Luxembourg and the Federal Republic of Germany, 5,286 bodies were moved to Sandweiler from 150 different cemeteries throughout Luxembourg. They had mostly lain in mass graves for which only incomplete records were available and the German War Graves Commission (Volksbund Deutsche Kriegsgräberfürsorge) set about identifying as many as possible. As a result, 4,014 of the 4,829 in the communal comrades' graves are now identified and listed.

Planning for the cemetery began in May 1952, and it was inaugurated on 5 June 1955, ten years after the end of the war. The ceremonial opening took place in the presence of more than 2,000 relatives of the dead, whom the Volksbund had brought to Sandweiler in special trains. With them came also delegations of schoolchildren from every German federal state.

In 2005, a special ceremony attended by civil and military representatives from Luxembourg and Germany as well as members of youth groups, took place to commemorate the 50th anniversary of the inauguration of the cemetery.

The last remains to be interred were those of an unknown German soldier discovered in the forests of Schumann's Eck near Wiltz in late 2007.

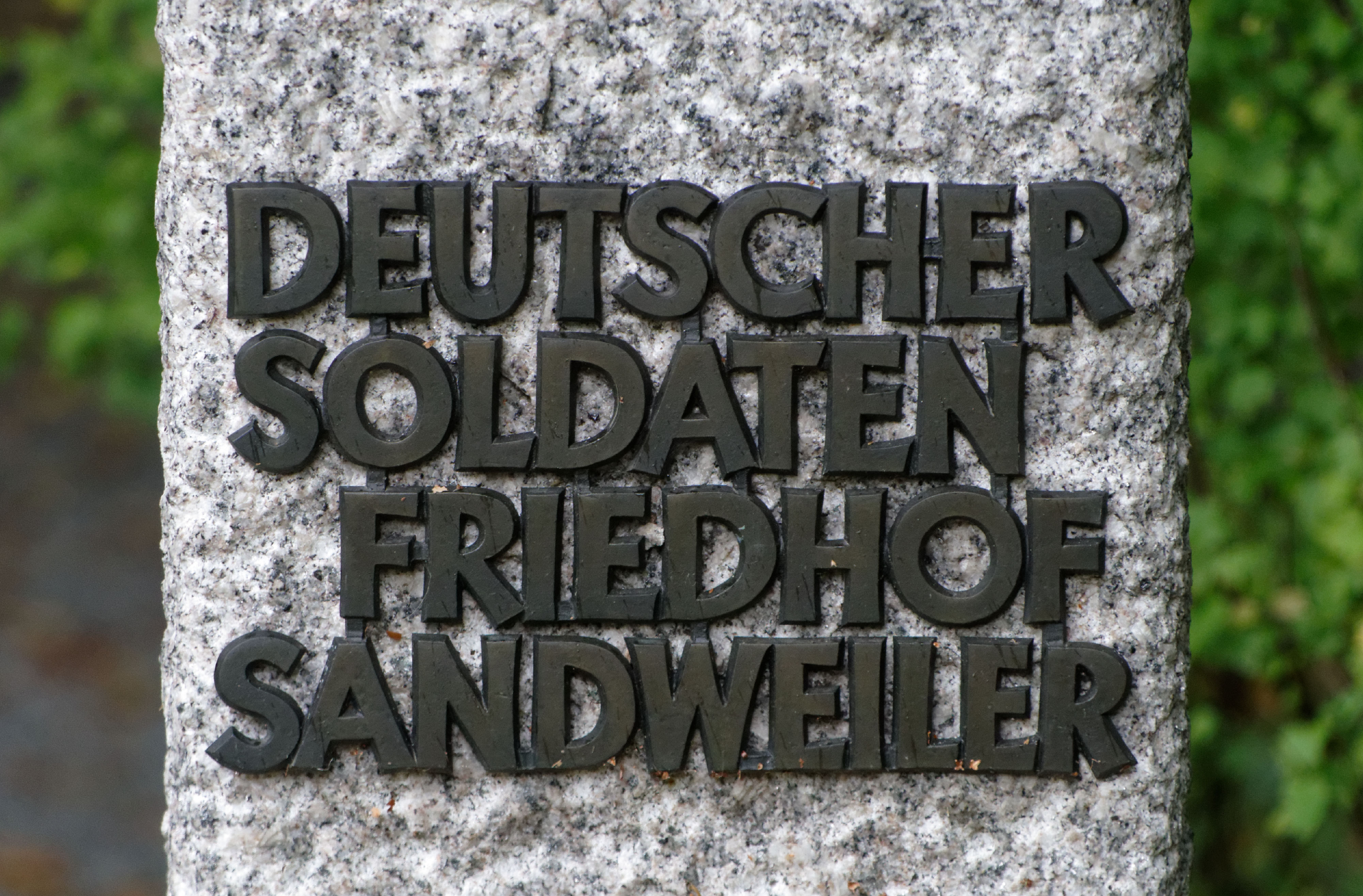
Entrance to the cemetery

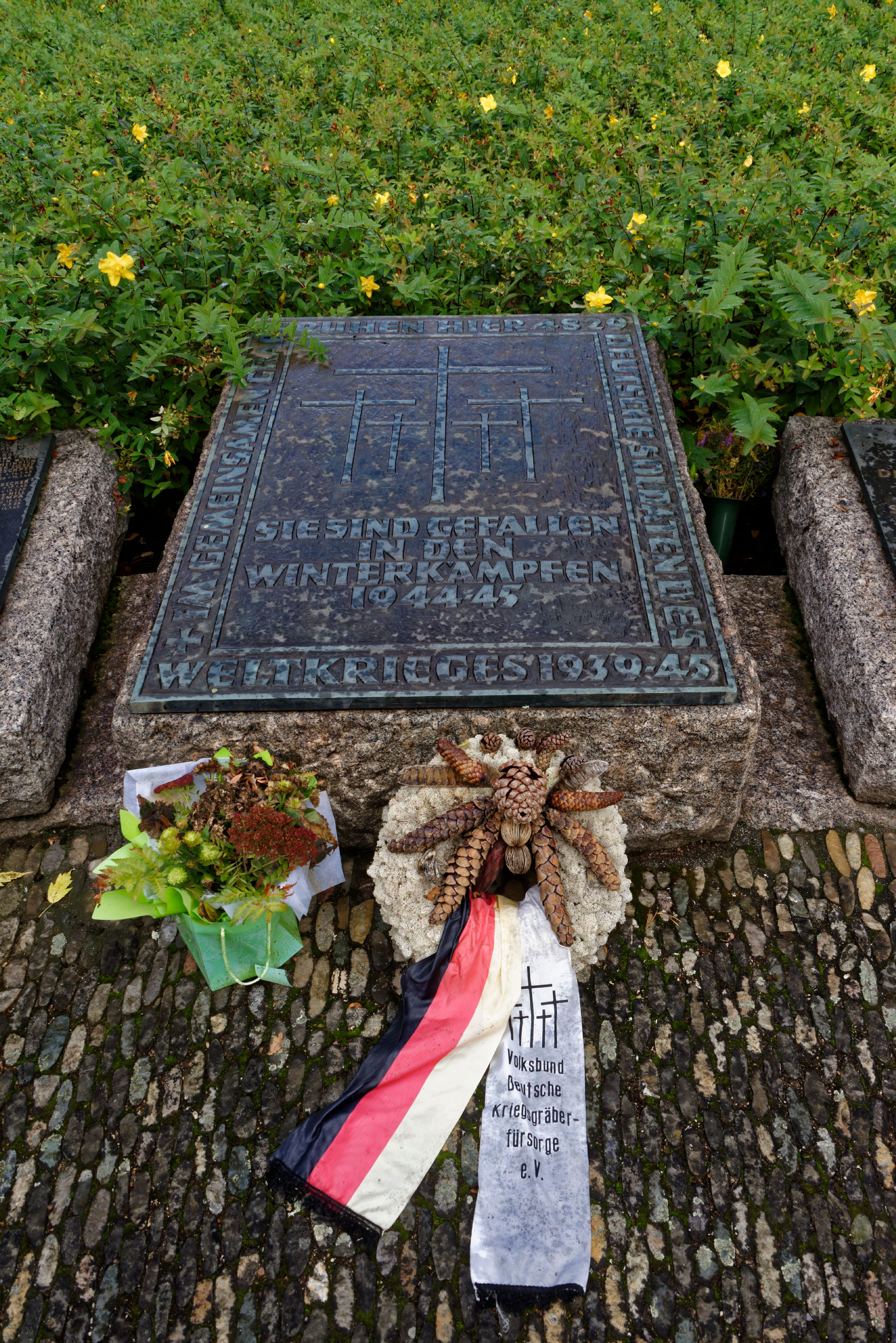
Plaque on the mass grave

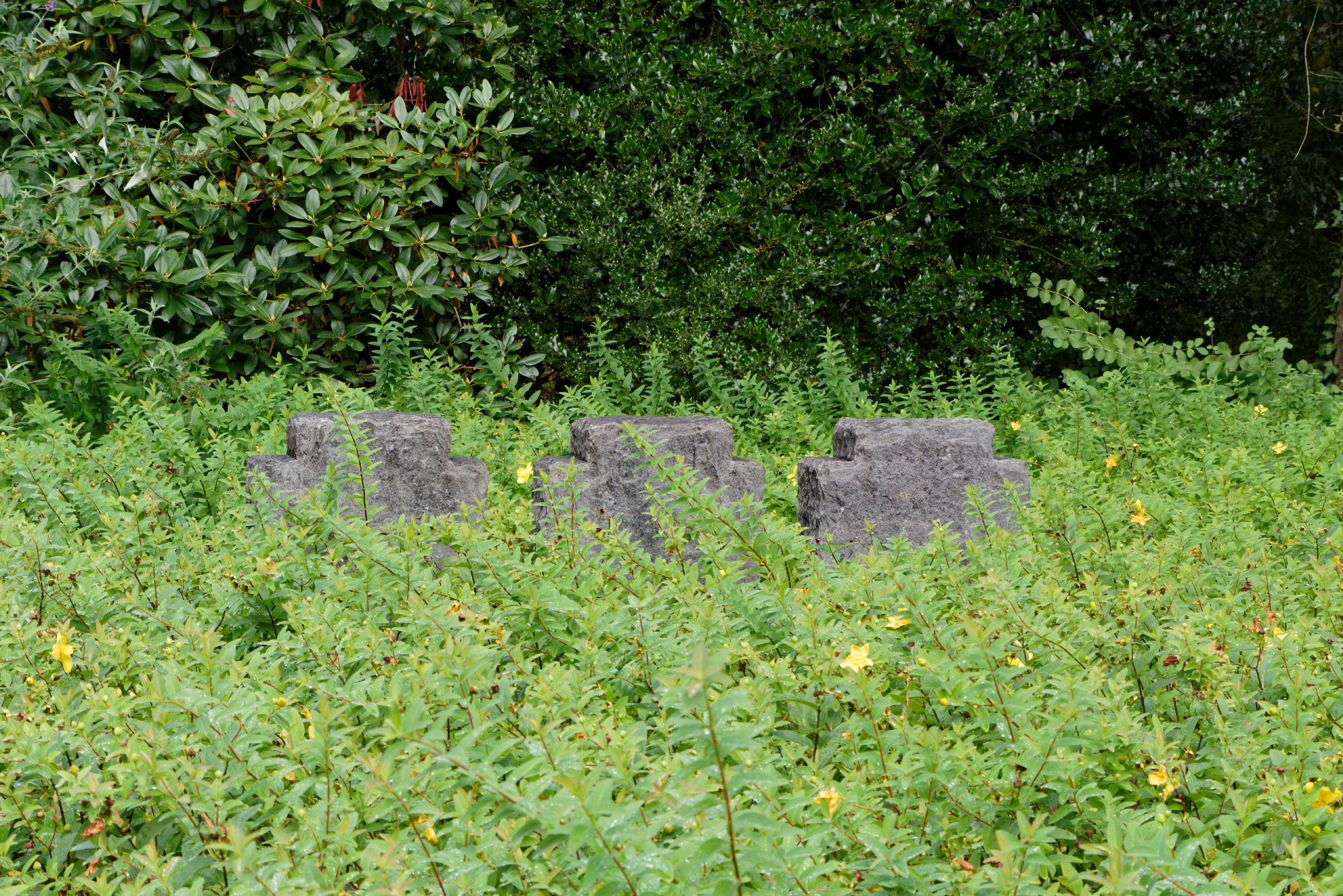
Anonymous crosses on the mass grave

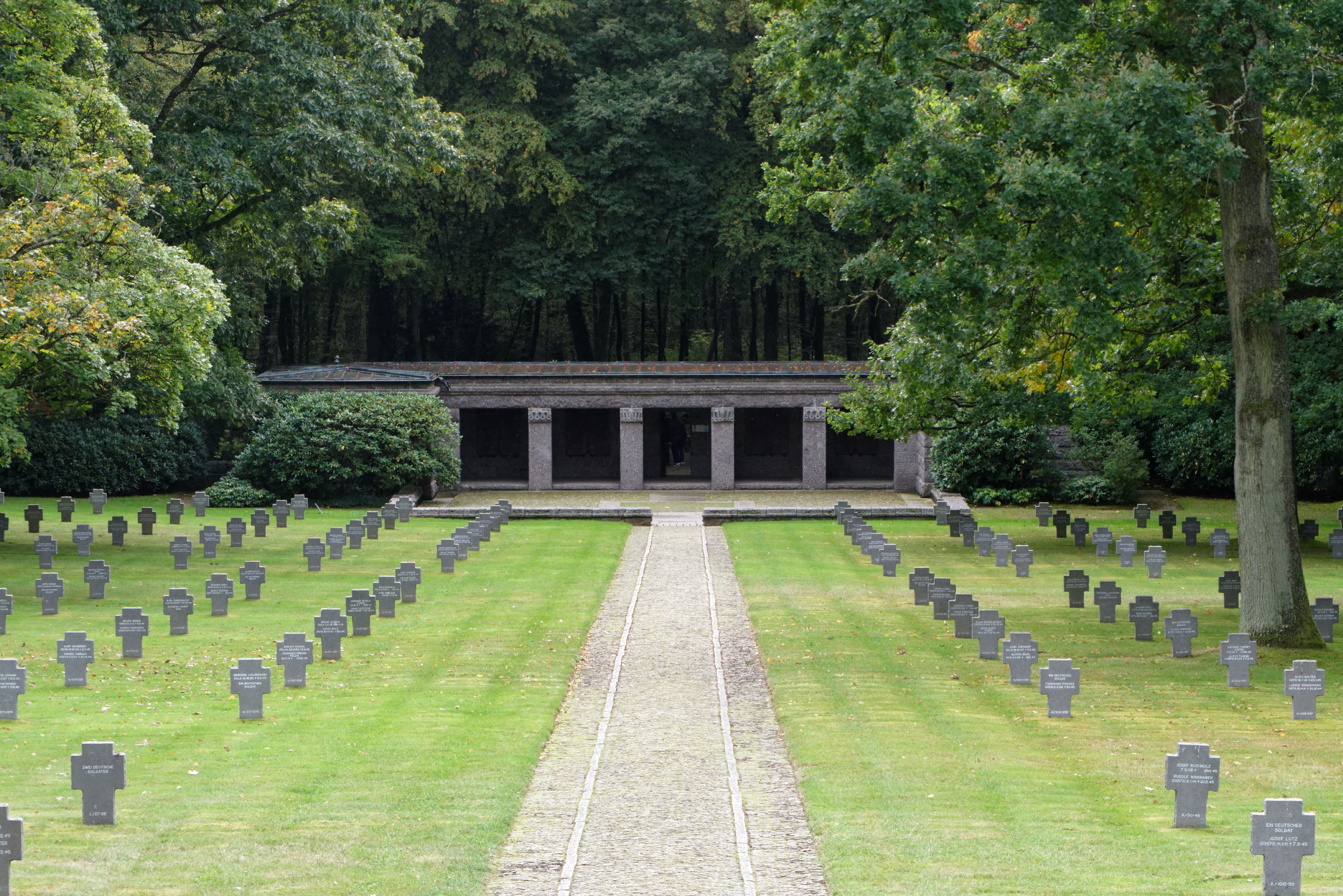
Entrance area (from the memorial)

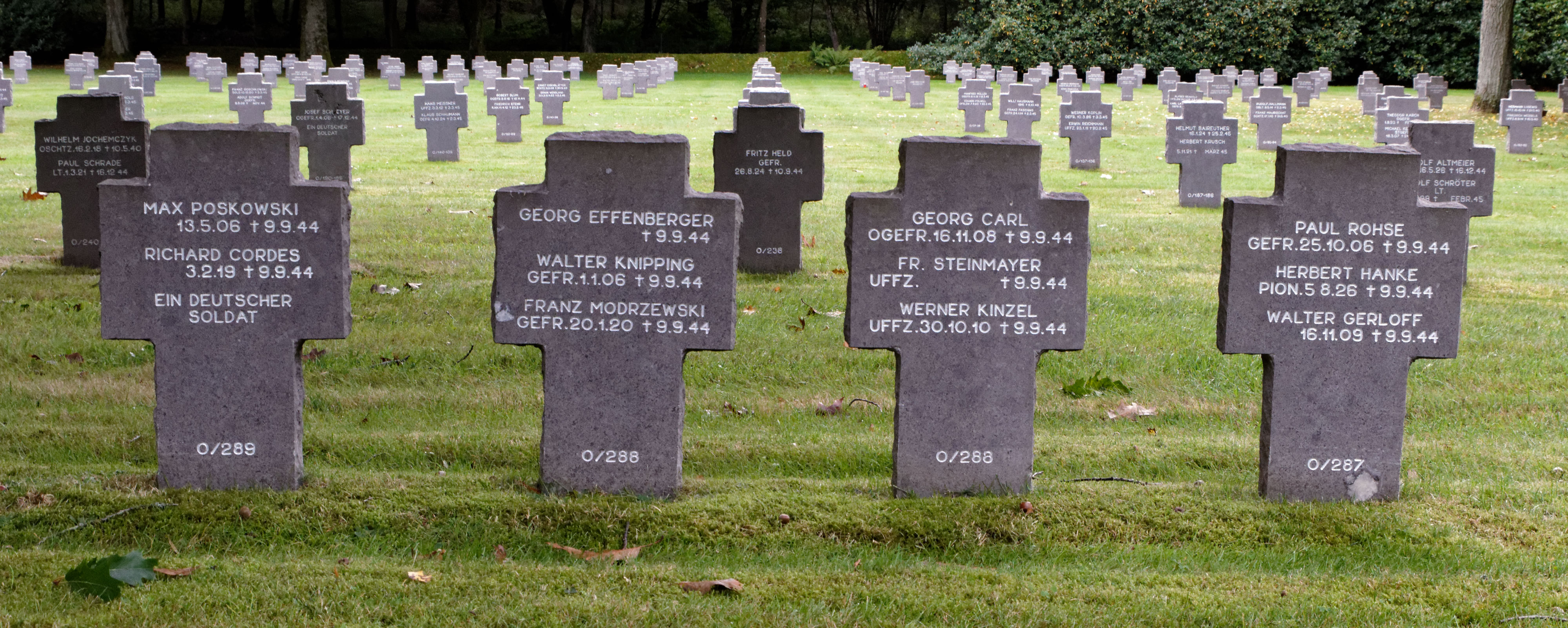
Group of fallen soldiers with triple inscriptions

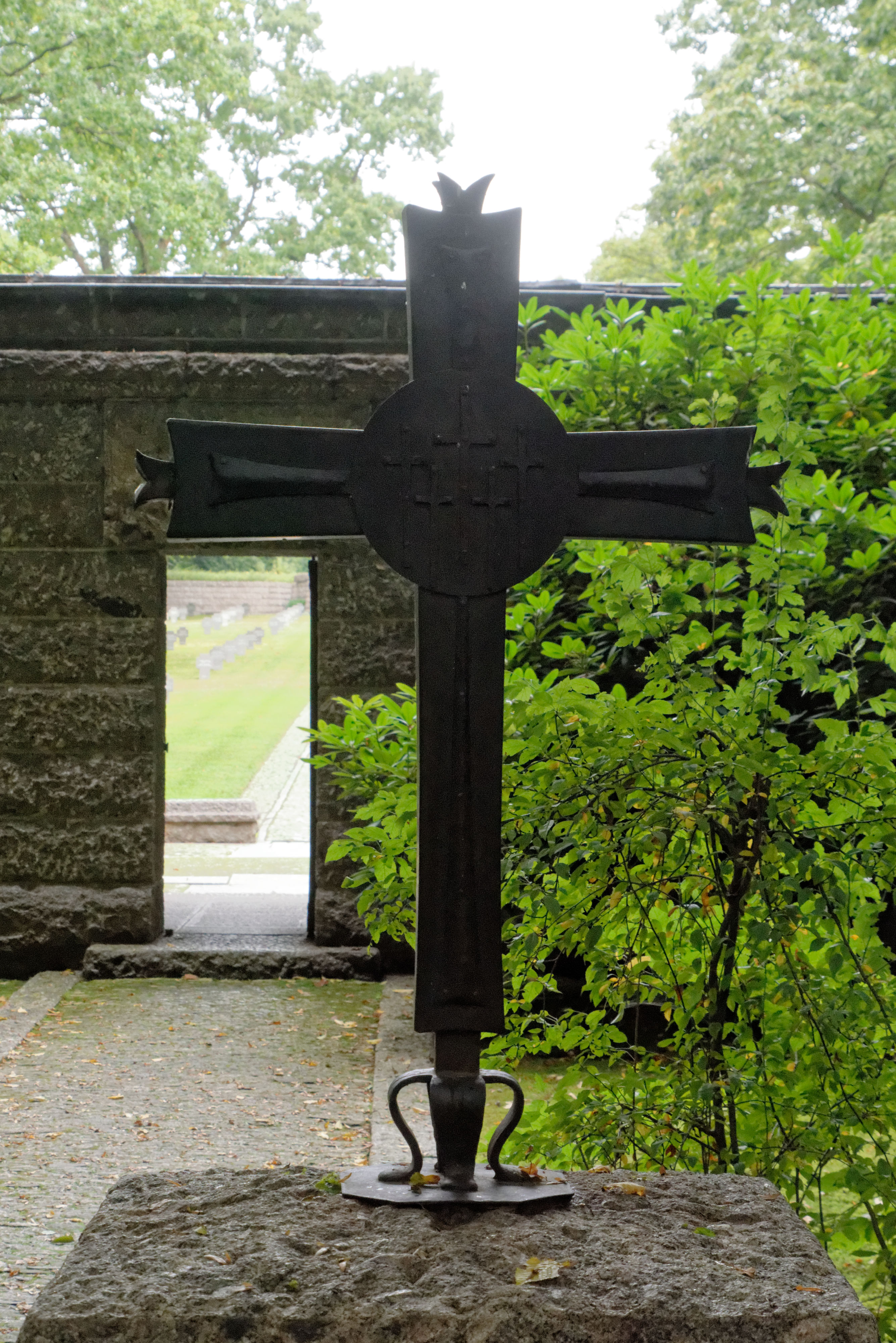
New cross (installed after theft)
