= South Bonnevoie =

District of Luxembourg City, Luxembourg

South Bonnevoie: Bonnevoie-Sud (French); Bouneweg-Süd (Luxembourgish); Bonneweg Süd (German)
- District
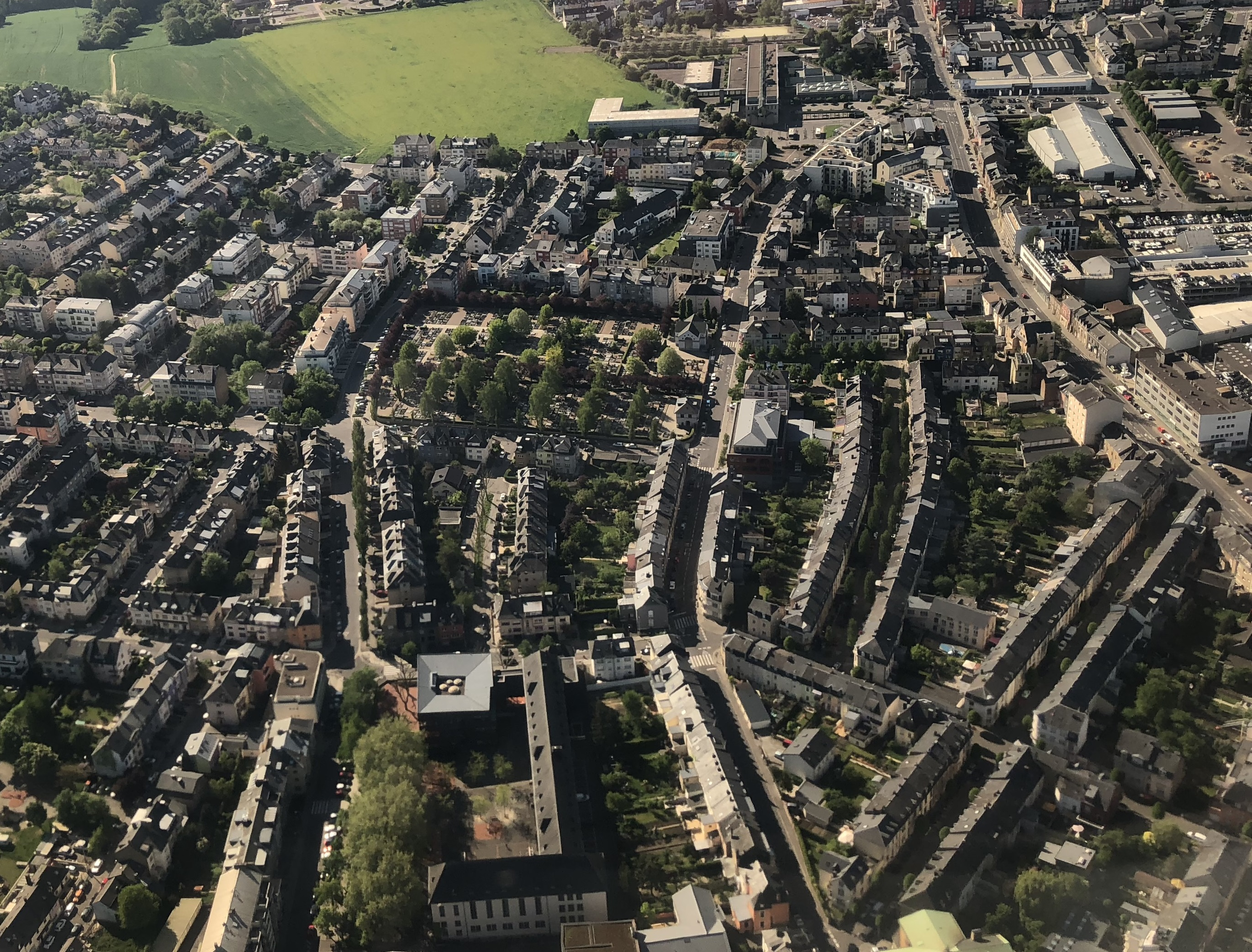

- South Bonnevoie is one of 24 districts in Luxembourg City
- Coordinates: 49.597°N 6.140°E
- Country: Luxembourg
- Commune: Luxembourg City

Area
  - Total: 2.3921 km^{2} (0.9236 sq mi)

Population (31 December 2025)
  - Total: 13,428
  - Density: 5,613.5/km^{2} (14,539/sq mi)

Nationality
  - Luxembourgish: 28.12%
  - Other: 71.88%
- Website: South Bonnevoie

South Bonnevoie (French: Bonnevoie-Sud [bɔnvwa syd]; Luxembourgish: Bouneweg-Süd [ˌbəʊ̯nəveːɕ ˈzyːt]; German: Bonneweg Süd [ˌbɔnəveːk ˈzyːt]) is a district in south-eastern Luxembourg City, in southern Luxembourg. Within the district lies most of the area of Bonnevoie, which also forms part of North Bonnevoie-Verlorenkost.

As of 31 December 2025, the district has a population of 13,428 inhabitants.
