= Canton of Luxembourg =

Canton of Luxembourg: Kanton Lëtzebuerg (Luxembourgish); Kanton Luxemburg (German); Canton de Luxembourg (French)
- Canton
- Coat of arms

- Coordinates: 49°36′N 6°6′E
- Country: Luxembourg
- Legislative constituency: Centre
- LAU 1: LU00003
- Communes (cities in bold): Bertrange; Contern; Hesperange; Luxembourg; Niederanven; Sandweiler; Schuttrange; Steinsel; Strassen; Walferdange; Weiler-la-Tour

Area
  - Total: 238.5 km^{2} (92.1 sq mi)
  - Rank: 5th of 12
- Highest elevation (8th of 12): 429 m (1,407 ft)
- Lowest elevation (8th of 12): 228 m (748 ft)

Population (2026)
  - Total: 213,766
  - Rank: 1st of 12
  - Density: 896.3/km^{2} (2,321/sq mi)
  - Rank: 1st of 12

Luxembourg (Luxembourgish: Lëtzebuerg) is a canton in the south of the Grand Duchy of Luxembourg. Its name, like the name of the Grand Duchy itself, derives from the name of its principal city, Luxembourg (more commonly known as Luxembourg City). It is not to be confused with the former district of Luxembourg, one of three administrative units in Luxembourg abolished in October 2015.

It is the only canton, other than Mersch, that is entirely surrounded by other cantons and, therefore, has no international boundary.

== Administrative divisions ==
Luxembourg Canton consists of the following eleven communes:

- Bertrange
- Contern
- Hesperange
- Luxembourg
- Niederanven
- Sandweiler
- Schuttrange
- Steinsel
- Strassen
- Walferdange
- Weiler-la-Tour

== Mergers ==
- On 26 March 1920 the former communes of Hamm, Hollerich and Rollingergrund (all from Luxembourg Canton) were merged into the commune of Luxembourg.
- On 1 July 1920 the former commune of Eich (from Luxembourg Canton) was merged into the commune of Luxembourg.

== Demographics ==
Historical population

Year	Pop.	±%
1821	23,953	—
1851	35,194	+46.9%
1871	39,755	+13.0%
1880	43,499	+9.4%
1890	45,397	+4.4%
1900	52,062	+14.7%
1910	57,828	+11.1%
1922	59,740	+3.3%
1930	67,907	+13.7%

Year	Pop.	±%
1947	76,900	+13.2%
1960	89,492	+16.4%
1970	101,654	+13.6%
1981	114,225	+12.4%
1991	117,471	+2.8%
2001	125,019	+6.4%
2011	151,592	+21.3%
2021	197,932	+30.6%

Source: Le Portail des Statistiques du Luxembourg
