= Sandweiler =

Sandweiler Sandweiler
- Commune
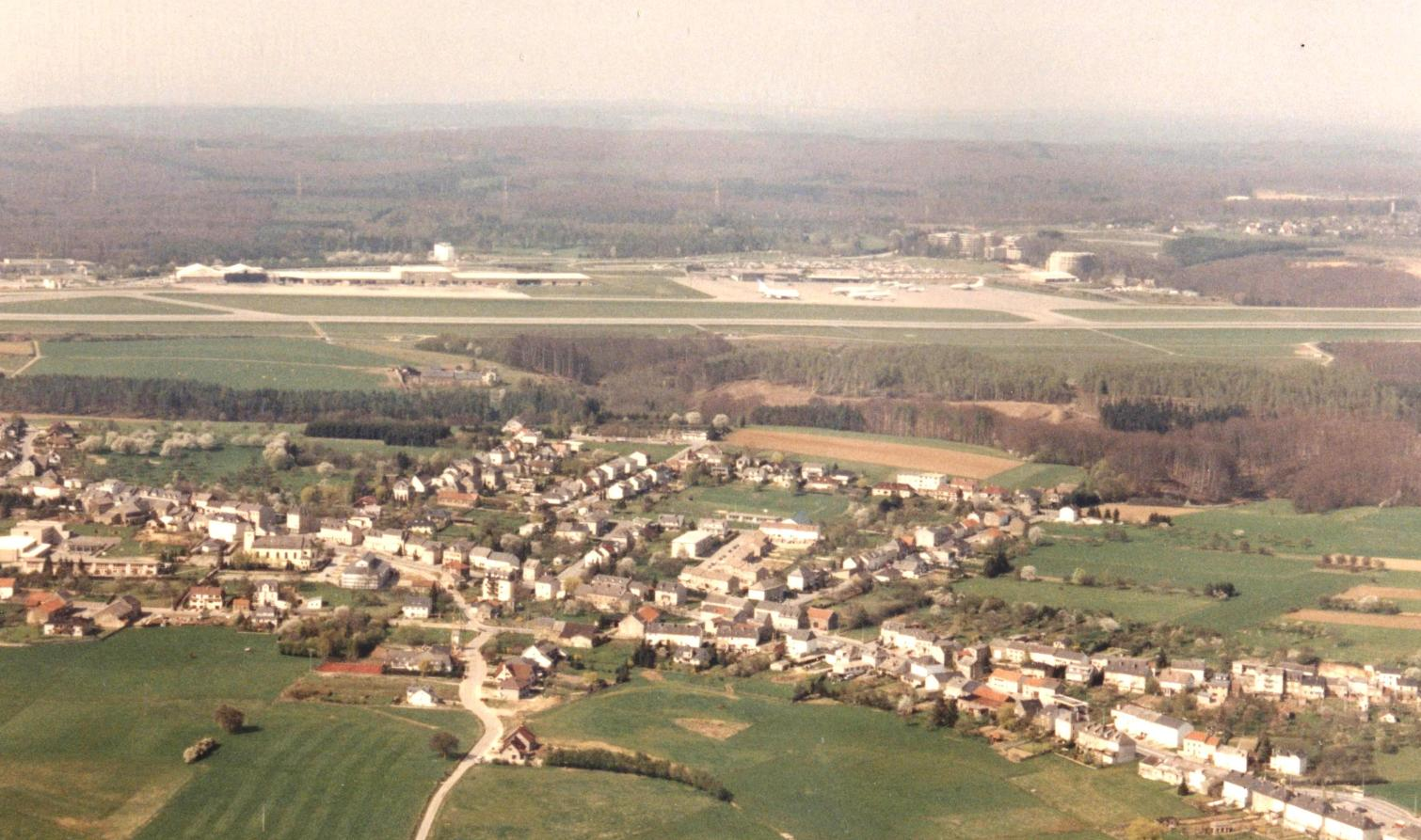
- Sandweiler and Findel

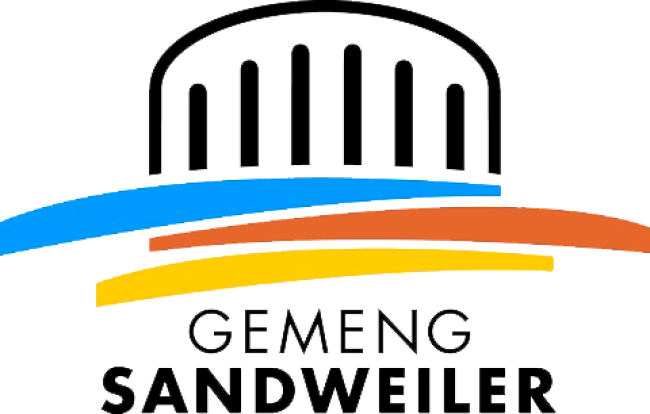
- Coat of arms Brandmark

- Map of Luxembourg with Sandweiler highlighted in orange, and the canton in dark red
- Coordinates: 49.6167°N 6.2167°E
- Country: Luxembourg
- Canton: Luxembourg

Government
  - Mayor: Jacqueline Breuer

Area
  - Total: 7.73 km^{2} (2.98 sq mi)
  - Rank: 98th of 100
- Highest elevation: 383 m (1,257 ft)
  - Rank: 67th of 100
- Lowest elevation: 294 m (965 ft)
  - Rank: 91st of 100

Population (2026)
  - Total: 3,867
  - Rank: 47th of 100
  - Density: 500/km^{2} (1,300/sq mi)
  - Rank: 18th of 100
- Time zone: UTC+1 (CET)
  - Summer (DST): UTC+2 (CEST)
- LAU 2: LU0000306
- Website: sandweiler.lu

Sandweiler (German pronunciation: [ˈzantvaɪlɐ]; Luxembourgish pronunciation: [ˈzɑntvɑɪ̯lɐ]) is a commune and town in southern Luxembourg. It is located 5 kilometres (3.1 mi) east of Luxembourg City.

As of September 2026, the town of Sandweiler, which lies in the south-west of the commune, has a population of 3,842. Other settlements within the commune include Findel and Birelerhaff.

The commune is dominated by Luxembourg Airport, Luxembourg's only international airport and the fifth-busiest cargo airport in Europe, which lies to the north and west of the town of Sandweiler. It is also home to the Sandweiler German war cemetery. The commune is surrounded by forests.

== Population ==
Historical population

Year	Pop.	±%
1821	468	—
1851	855	+82.7%
1900	942	+10.2%
1910	849	−9.9%
1922	881	+3.8%
1935	939	+6.6%

Year	Pop.	±%
1947	895	−4.7%
1960	1,120	+25.1%
1970	1,927	+72.1%
1981	2,028	+5.2%
1990	2,116	+4.3%
2000	2,385	+12.7%

Year	Pop.	±%
2005	2,893	+21.3%
2010	3,150	+8.9%
2015	3,478	+10.4%
2020	3,698	+6.3%
2021	3,659	−1.1%

Source data

== Economy ==
Two airline companies, Luxair and Cargolux, have their head offices on the grounds of Luxembourg Findel Airport in Sandweiler.

DuPont Teijin Films has its headquarters in Sandweiler commune.

A small retail zone can be found Op der Hokaul in the west of the town Sandweiler.

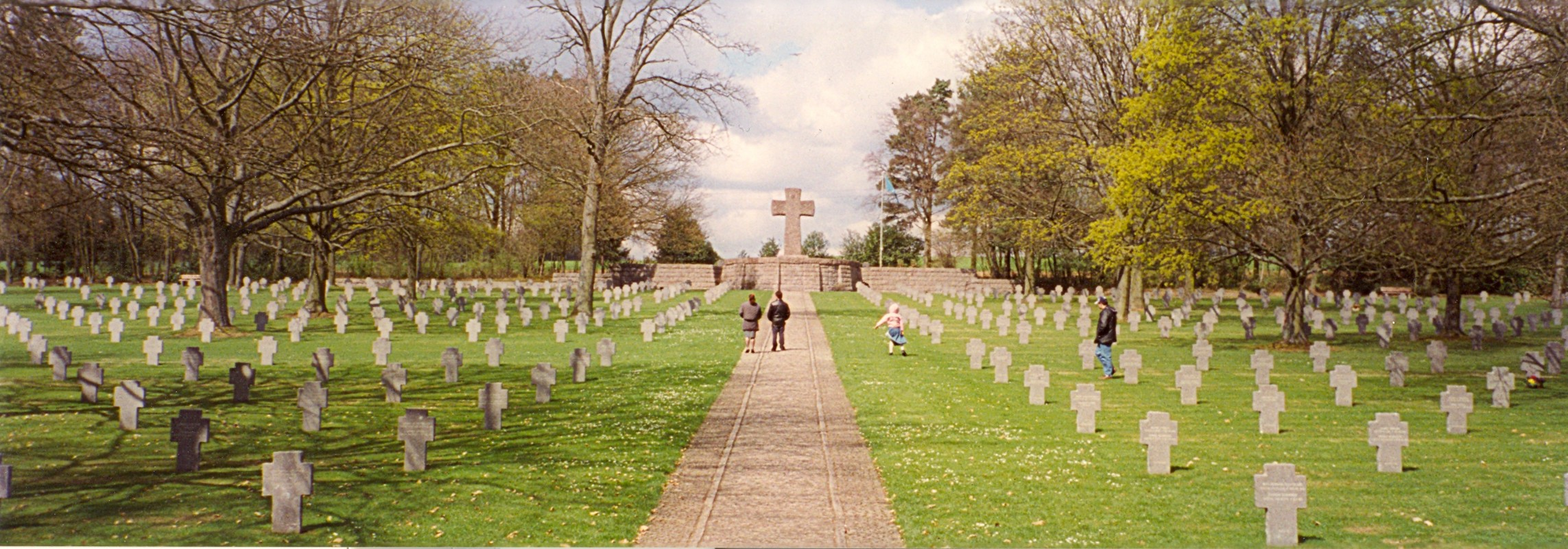
Sandweiler German war cemetery

== Places of interest ==
The Sandweiler German war cemetery contains the remains of around 10900 German servicemen fallen in the Battle of the Bulge. It is over 1 km from the more widely known Luxembourg American Cemetery in Hamm.

== Notable people ==
- Brian Molko, Scottish-American singer, member of Placebo, grew up in Sandweiler
