= Rollingergrund-North Belair =

District of Luxembourg City, Luxembourg

Rollingergrund-North Belair: Rollengergronn-Belair-Nord (Luxembourgish); Rollingergrund-Belair-Nord (French); Rollingergrund-Belair-Nord (German)
- District
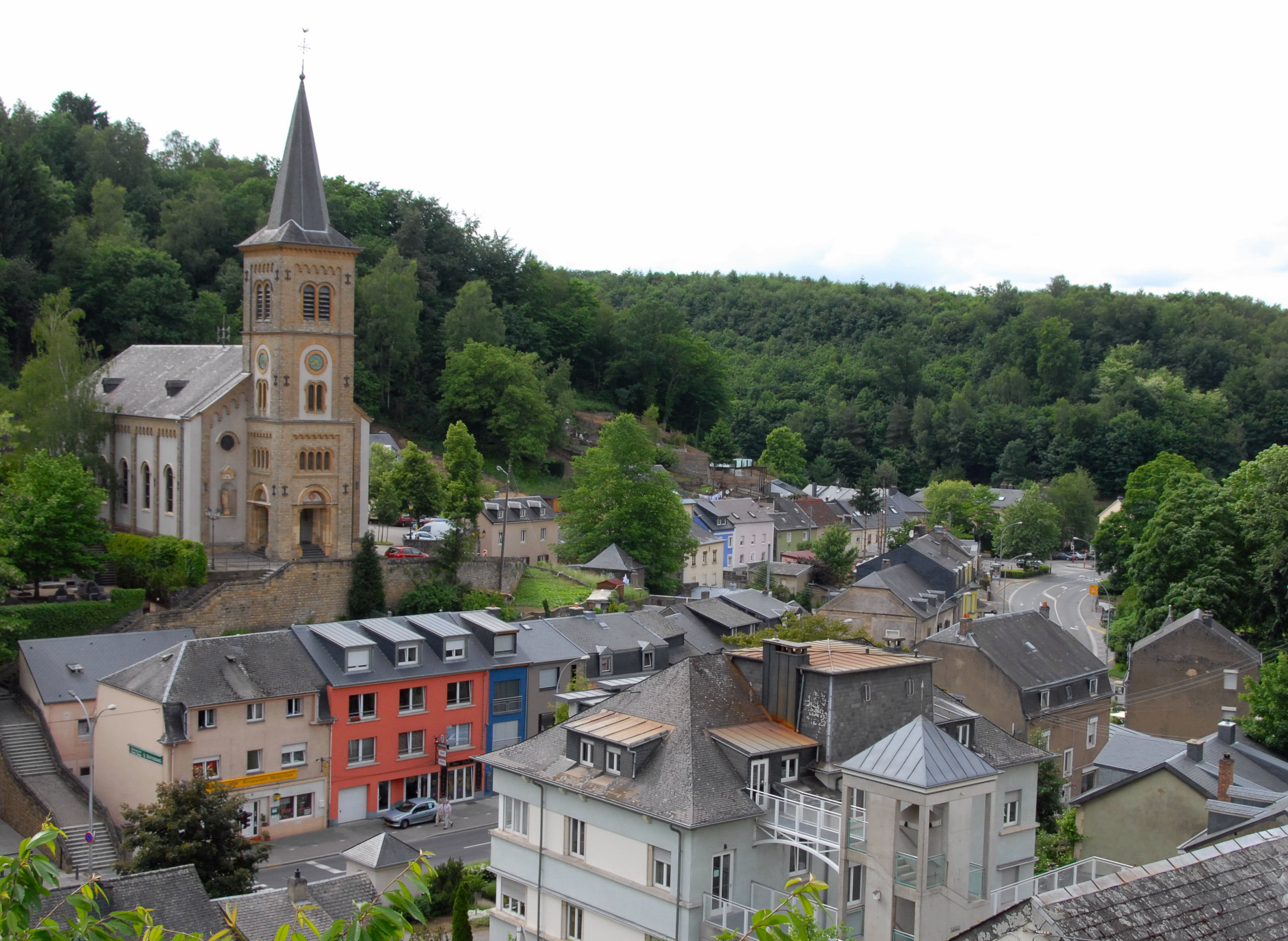

- Rollingergrund-North Belair is one of 24 districts in Luxembourg City
- Coordinates: 49°37′N 6°06′E
- Country: Luxembourg
- Commune: Luxembourg City

Area
  - Total: 6.3387 km^{2} (2.4474 sq mi)

Population (31 December 2025)
  - Total: 4,898
  - Density: 772.7/km^{2} (2,001/sq mi)

Nationality
  - Luxembourgish: 29.44%
  - Other: 70.56%
- Website: Rollingergrund-North Belair

Rollingergrund-North Belair (Luxembourgish: Rollengergronn-Belair-Nord, pronounced [ˌʀoleŋɐˌɡʀon bæˌlɛːɐ̯ ˈnoχt]; French: Rollingergrund-Belair-Nord; German: Rollingergrund-Belair-Nord) is a district in north-western Luxembourg City, in southern Luxembourg. Within the modern district lies most of the former commune of Rollingergrund.

As of 31 December 2025, the district had a population of 4,898 inhabitants.
