= North Bonnevoie-Verlorenkost =

District of Luxembourg City, Luxembourg

North Bonnevoie-Verlorenkost: Bonnevoie-Nord/Verlorenkost (French); Bouneweg-Nord/Verluerekascht (Luxembourgish); Bonneweg-Nord/Verlorenkost (German)
- District

- North Bonnevoie-Verlorenkost is one of 24 districts in Luxembourg City
- Coordinates: 49.60556°N 6.14017°E
- Country: Luxembourg
- Commune: Luxembourg City

Area
  - Total: 0.6776 km^{2} (0.2616 sq mi)

Population (31 December 2025)
  - Total: 4,581
  - Density: 6,761/km^{2} (17,510/sq mi)

Nationality
  - Luxembourgish: 28.12%
  - Other: 71.88%
- Website: North Bonnevoie-Verlorenkost

North Bonnevoie-Verlorenkost (French: Bonnevoie-Nord/Verlorenkost [bɔnvwa nɔʁ fɛʁlɔʁənkɔst]; Luxembourgish: Bouneweg-Nord/Verluerekascht [ˌbəʊ̯nəveːɕ ˌnoχt fɐˈlu̯əʀəkɑʃt]; German: Bonneweg-Nord/Verlorenkost [ˌbɔnəveːk ˌnɔʁt fɛɐ̯ˈloːʁənkɔst]) is a district in southern Luxembourg City, in southern Luxembourg. Within the district lies some of the area of Bonnevoie, most of which lies in the district of South Bonnevoie.

As of 31 December 2025, the district has a population of 4,581 inhabitants.
