= Findel, Luxembourg =

Village in Luxembourg

Coordinates: 49°37′47″N 6°12′20″E

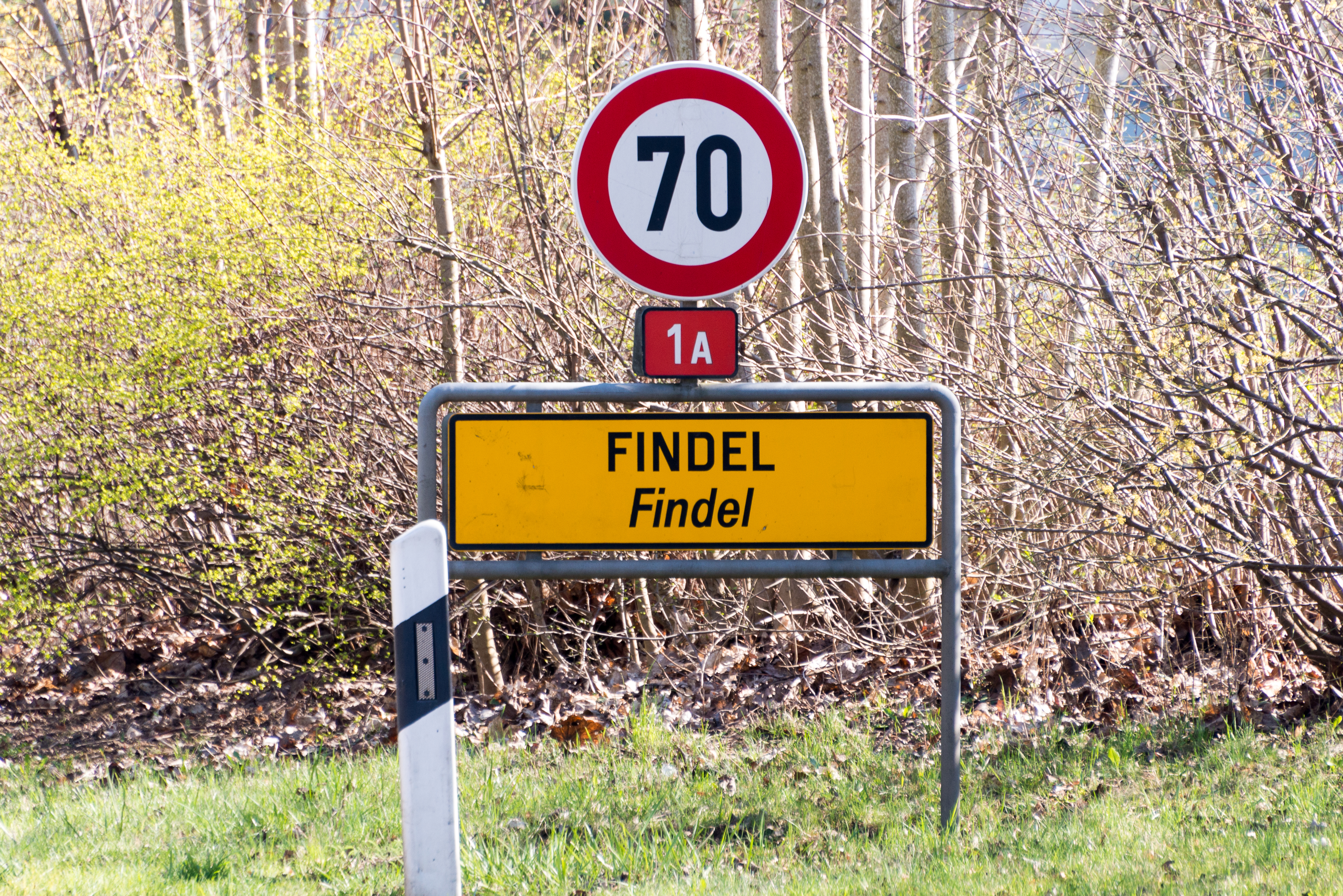

Findel (German pronunciation: [ˈfɪndl̩]) is a village in the commune of Sandweiler, in southern Luxembourg. As of September 2026, the village had a population of 25. Findel is dominated by Luxembourg Findel Airport, the only international airport in Luxembourg.

It was at Findel that Grand Duchess Charlotte of Luxembourg returned to the country after its liberation at the end of World War II.

== Climate ==
Findel is the site of the sole weather station operated by MeteoLux, Luxembourg's national meteorological agency, situated within the airport's perimeter. Between 8 and 12 August 2003, during the 2003 European heat wave, a temperature of 37.9 °C (100.2 °F) was recorded at Findel, at that time the highest in Luxembourg since records began in 1947. The record was surpassed on 25 July 2019 with a temperature of 39.0 °C (102.2 °F), though a national record of 40.8 °C (105.4 °F) was set on the same day in Steinsel.
