= Eich, Luxembourg City =

District of Luxembourg City, Luxembourg

Eich Eech (Luxembourgish)
- District
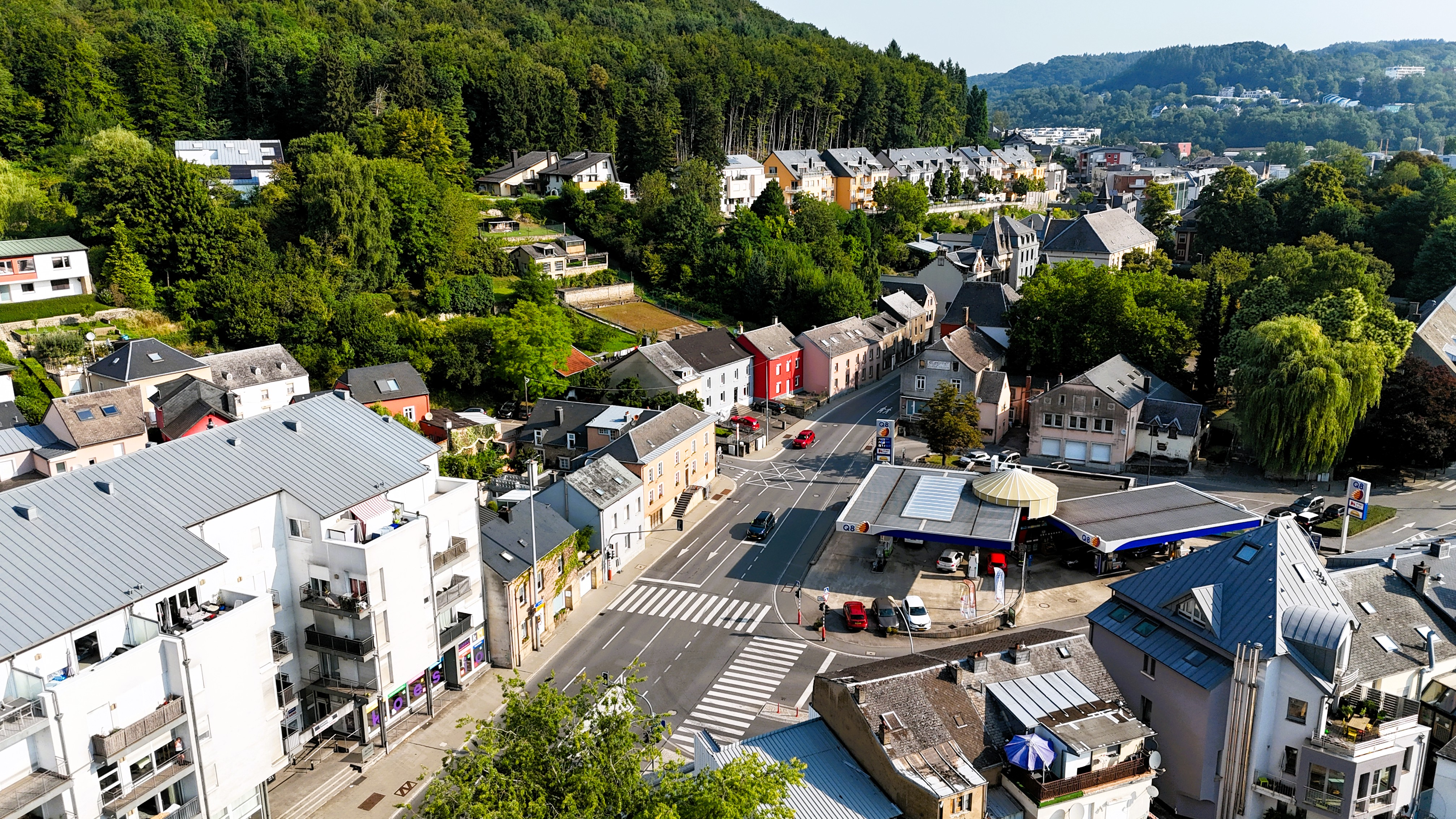

- Eich is one of 24 districts in Luxembourg City
- Country: Luxembourg
- Commune: Luxembourg City

Area
  - Total: 0.6318 km^{2} (0.2439 sq mi)

Population (31 December 2025)
  - Total: 3,079
  - Density: 4,873/km^{2} (12,620/sq mi)

Nationality
  - Luxembourgish: 29.98%
  - Other: 70.02%
- Website: Eich

Eich (German pronunciation: [aɪç]; Luxembourgish: Eech, pronounced [eːɕ]) is a district in northern Luxembourg City, in southern Luxembourg.

As of 31 December 2025, the district has a population of 3,079 inhabitants.

== Commune ==
Eich Eech
- Former commune of Luxembourg
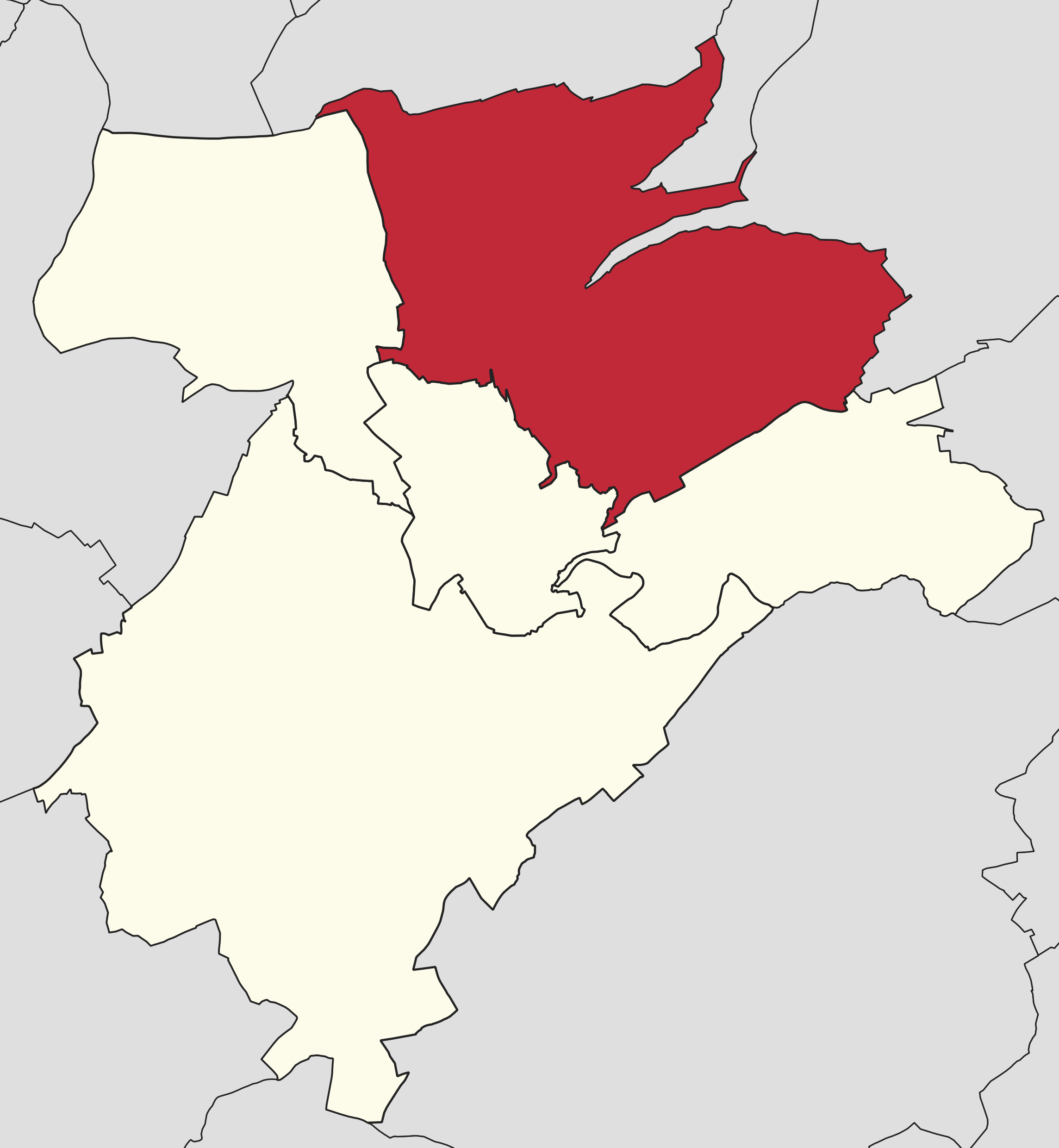
- Map of Luxembourg City before 1920, with the Commune of Eich highlighted in red
- Country: Luxembourg
- District: Luxembourg
- Canton: Luxembourg
- Created: Original commune
- Abolished: 1 July 1920

Area
  - Total: 13.176 km^{2} (5.087 sq mi)
- Currently: Part of Luxembourg City

Eich was a commune in the canton of Luxembourg until 1 July 1920, when it was merged into Luxembourg City. Until 8 May 1849, the commune of Eich also included Rollingergrund, which was made a separate commune on that date, before being merged into Luxembourg City on 26 March 1920.
