= Hamm, Luxembourg City =

District of Luxembourg City, Luxembourg

Hamm
- District
- Hamm is one of 24 districts in Luxembourg City
- Coordinates: 49.607°N 6.169°E
- Country: Luxembourg
- Commune: Luxembourg City

Area
  - Total: 4.0762 km^{2} (1.5738 sq mi)

Population (31 December 2025)
  - Total: 1,606
  - Density: 394.0/km^{2} (1,020/sq mi)

Nationality
  - Luxembourgish: 43.15%
  - Other: 56.85%
- Website: Hamm

Hamm Hamm
- Former commune of Luxembourg
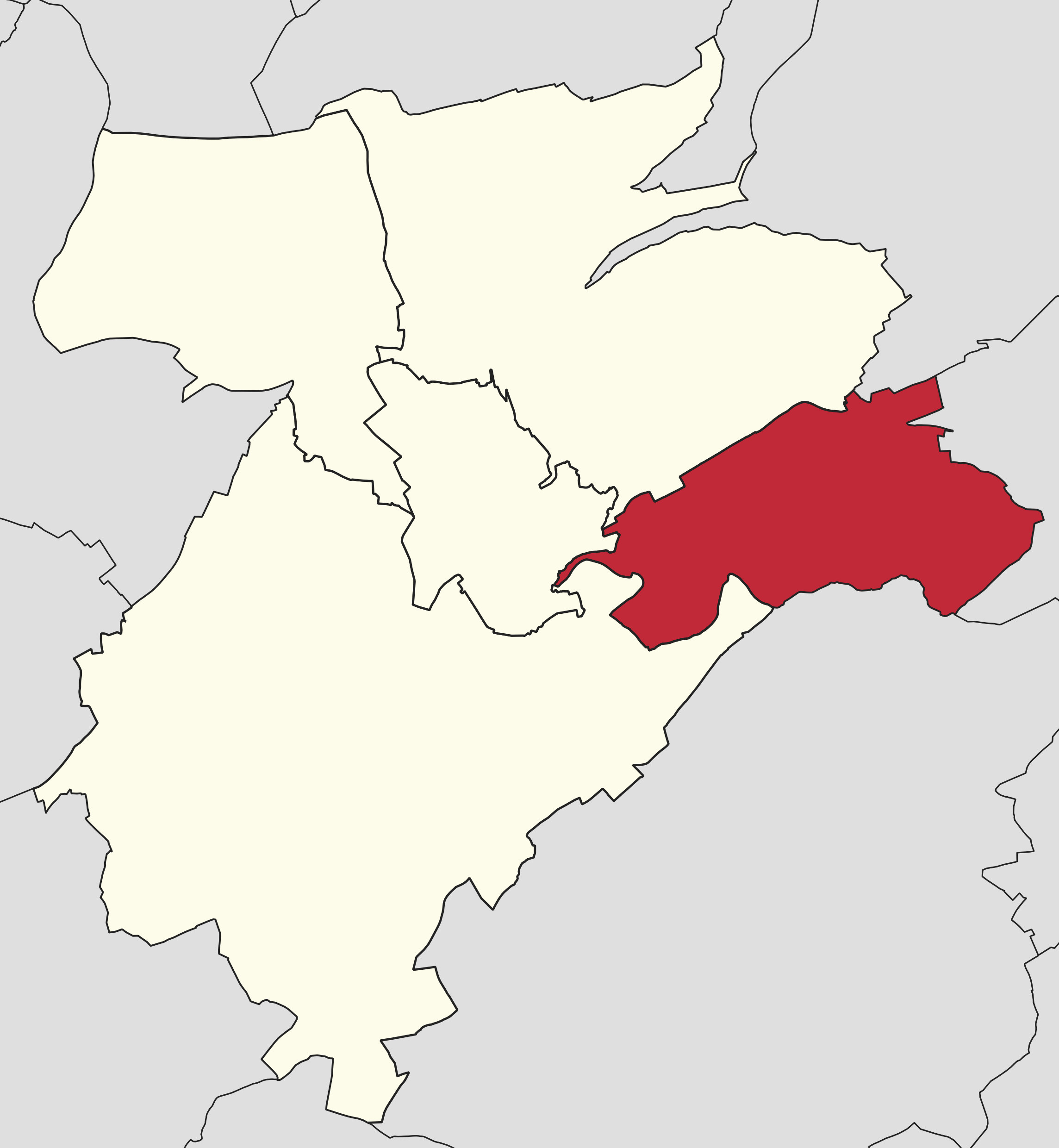
- Map of Luxembourg City before 1920, with the Commune of Hamm highlighted in red
- Country: Luxembourg
- District: Luxembourg
- Canton: Luxembourg
- Created: 20 December 1873
- Abolished: 26 March 1920

Area
  - Total: 6.083 km^{2} (2.349 sq mi)
- Currently: Part of Luxembourg City

Hamm (German pronunciation: [ham], Luxembourgish pronunciation: [hɑm]) is a district in eastern Luxembourg City, in southern Luxembourg. It is the home of the Luxembourg American Cemetery and Memorial, the final resting place of 5,076 American servicemen, including General Patton.

As of 31 December 2025, the district has a population of 1,606 inhabitants.

== History ==
Hamm's origins lie in the convent of St. Catharine, founded in the 14th century, around which a village developed. The proximity to the Alzette river facilitated the construction of several mills, which formed the basis for spinning and weaving wool from 1835. In the course of the next years, the Godchaux were able to expand their wool production by buying up almost all the mills on the Alzette, which were combined with another factory in Ettelbrück into the „Draperies de Luxembourg“. At their high point, the cloth mills employed up to 2,000 people. Due to the economic boom, Hamm was split off from the commune of Sandweiler in 1873 and received its own administration.

By the law of 20 December 1873, the areas of Hamm, Schleifmühl, Fetschenbour, Haemmerstellgen, Scheidgrund, Scheidhof, Zens, Tavion and Pulvermühl were detached from the commune of Sandweiler and established as the commune of Hamm, with Hamm as its administrative centre.

This change had been driven by the inhabitants of the electoral wards of Hamm, Schleifmühl and Pulvermühl. Initially, after the strong growth of the drapery industry in Schleifmühl around the 1870s when 800 workers were employed by the Godchaux family, residents had addressed a petition to the mayor of Sandweiler, demanding that the above three wards receive an increased number of councillors.

Hamm was a commune in the canton of Luxembourg between 20 December 1873, when it was split from the commune of Sandweiler, and 26 March 1920, when it was merged into the city of Luxembourg, along with Hollerich and Rollingergrund.

=== Electoral history ===
Election	Mayor	Échevins	
2 January 1874	Paul Godchaux	Jean-Pierre Limpach	Jean Jungblut
30 November 1875	Paul Godchaux	Jean-Pierre Limpach	Victor Conrot
1 December 1881	Paul Godchaux	Jean-Pierre Limpach	Victor Conrot
28 October 1884	Paul Godchaux	Mathias Grosber	Victor Conrot
23 April 1889	Jules Godchaux	Mathias Friderich	Victor Conrot
28 October 1890	Jules Godchaux	Mathias Friderich	Victor Conrot
28 October 1893	Jules Godchaux	Jean-Pierre Limpach	Victor Conrot
27 October 1896	Jules Godchaux	Pierre Huberty	Victor Conrot
31 October 1899	Jules Godchaux	Jean Uselding	Victor Conrot
28 October 1902	Jules Godchaux	Jean Uselding	Nicolas Koch
31 October 1905	Jules Godchaux	Jean Uselding	Nicolas Koch
31 October 1911	Jules Godchaux	Jean Eicher	Nicolas Friedrich
27 October 1914	Jules Godchaux	Jean Eicher	Jean-Nicolas Ernst
31 October 1917	Pierre Kohner	Eugène Colling	Jean-Pierre Bertrang
