= Neudorf-Weimershof =

District of Luxembourg City, Luxembourg

Neudorf-Weimershof Neiduerf-Weimeschhaff (Luxembourgish)
- District
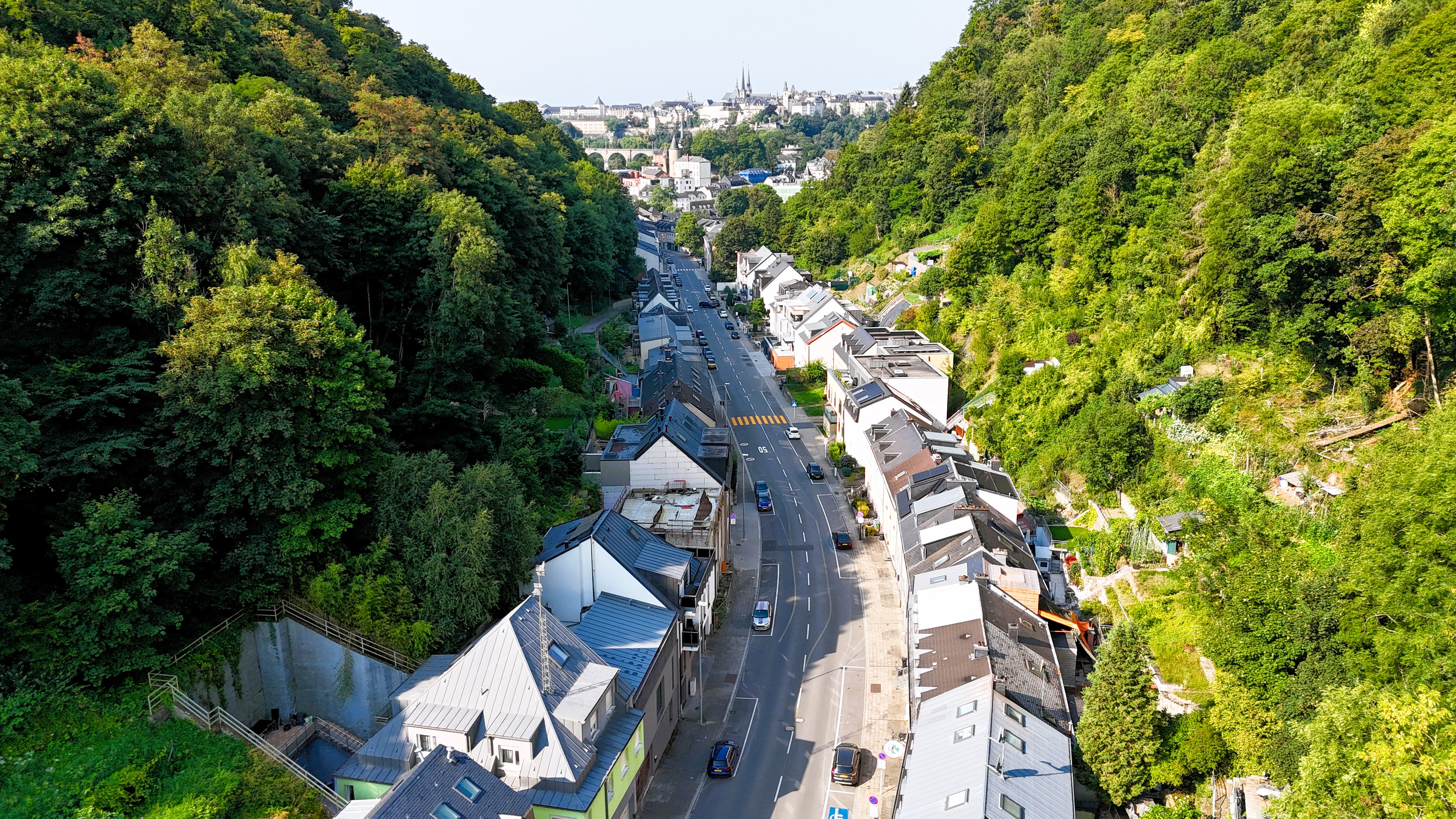
- View of Neudorf looking west Buildings in Weimershof

- Neudorf-Weimershof is one of 24 districts in Luxembourg City
- Coordinates: 49.62046°N 6.16250°E
- Country: Luxembourg
- Commune: Luxembourg City

Area
  - Total: 2.4893 km^{2} (0.9611 sq mi)

Population (31 December 2025)
  - Total: 7,178
  - Density: 2,884/km^{2} (7,468/sq mi)

Nationality
  - Luxembourgish: 25.17%
  - Other: 74.83%
- Website: Neudorf-Weimershof

Neudorf-Weimershof (German pronunciation: [ˈnɔʏdɔʁf ˈvaɪmɐshoːf]; Luxembourgish: Neiduerf-Weimeschhaff, pronounced [ˈnɑɪ̯du̯əf ˌvɑɪ̯məʃˈhɑf]) is a district in eastern Luxembourg City, in southern Luxembourg. It is composed of two topographically distinct neighbourhoods: Neudorf, established along a narrow valley, and Weimershof, which is located in the southern part of the Kirchberg plateau.

As of 31 December 2025, the district has a population of 7,178 inhabitants.

A pedestrian and cycle bridge linking Weimershof to the district of Cents, spanning the Neudorf valley to which it will be connected via a panoramic elevator, is due to be completed in 2028.
