= Pulvermuhl =

District of Luxembourg City, Luxembourg

Pulvermuhl: Polvermillen (Luxembourgish); Pulvermühle (German)
- District
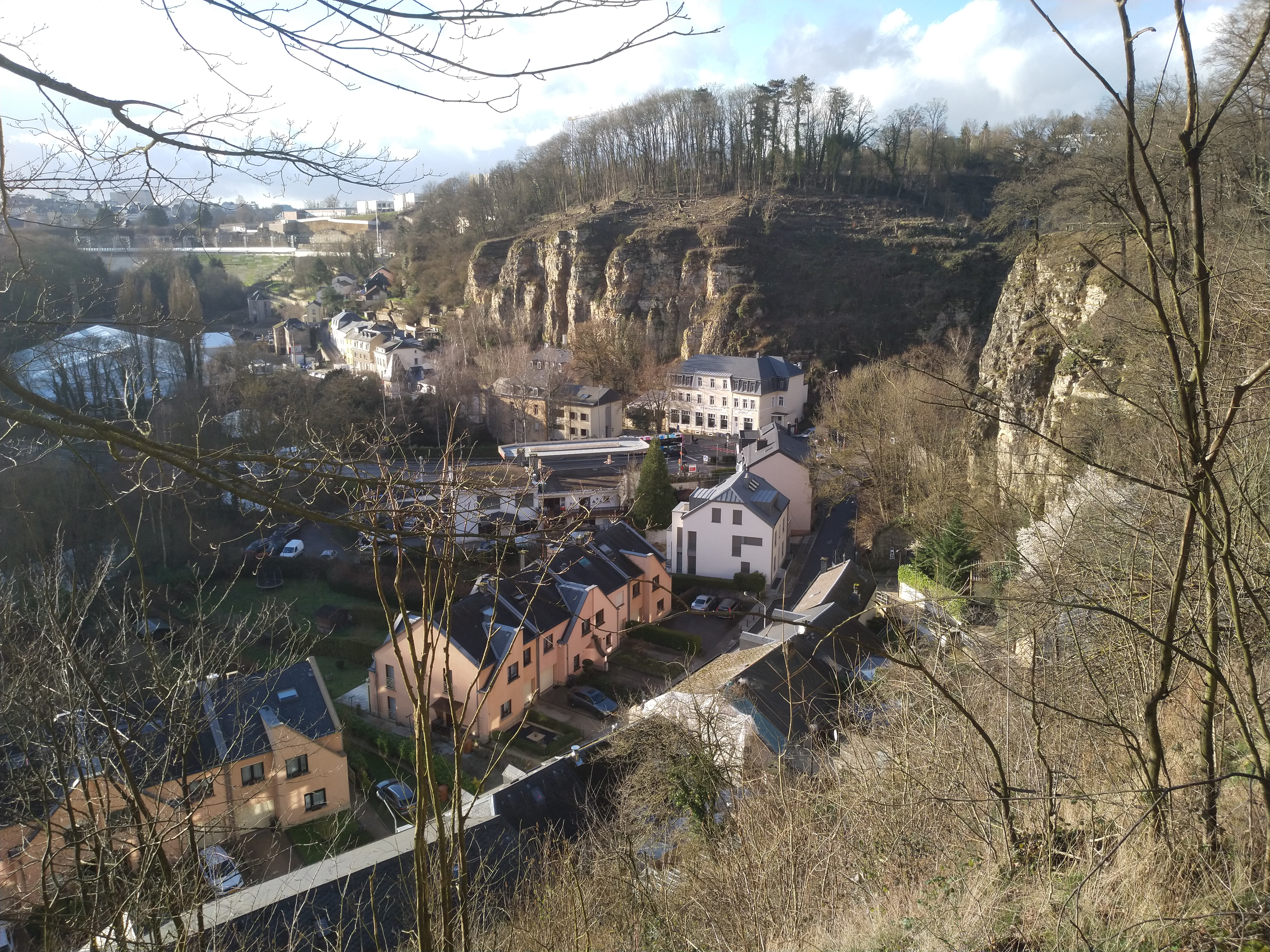

- Pulvermuhl is one of 24 districts in Luxembourg City
- Coordinates: 49.60888°N 6.15163°E
- Country: Luxembourg
- Commune: Luxembourg City

Area
  - Total: 0.2482 km^{2} (0.0958 sq mi)

Population (31 December 2025)
  - Total: 386
  - Density: 1,560/km^{2} (4,030/sq mi)

Nationality
  - Luxembourgish: 29.69%
  - Other: 70.31%
- Website: Pulvermuhl

Pulvermuhl (Luxembourgish: Polvermillen [ˈpolfɐˌmilən]; German: Pulvermühle [ˈpʊlfɐˌmyːlə]) is a district in eastern Luxembourg City, in southern Luxembourg.

As of 31 December 2025, the district has a population of 386 inhabitants.
