= Districts of Luxembourg City =

Administrative divisions of Luxembourg City, Luxembourg

The 24 districts of Luxembourg City vary in size greatly: a legacy of the historical expansion of the city limits.

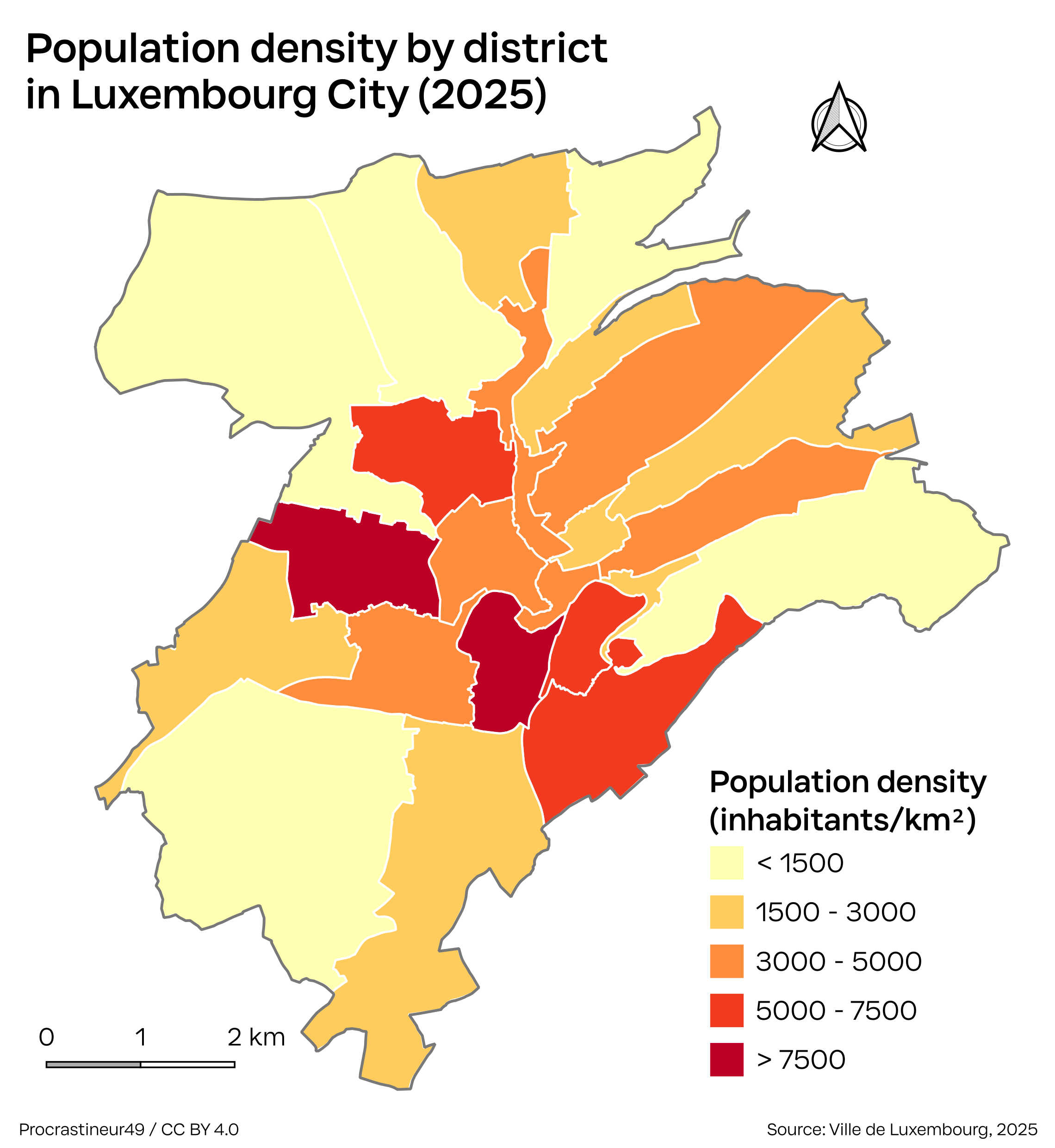
Map of population density in the 24 districts.

Districts (French: quartiers; Luxembourgish: Quartieren) are the administrative divisions of Luxembourg City, the capital and largest city in the Grand Duchy of Luxembourg.

There are currently 24 districts, covering the commune of Luxembourg City in its entirety. They are:

| District | Population (As of 31 December 2025) | Area (ha) | Map |
|---|---|---|---|
| Beggen | 3,844 | 170.91 | |
| Belair | 13,331 | 171.80 | |
| North Bonnevoie-Verlorenkost | 4,581 | 67.76 | |
| South Bonnevoie | 13,428 | 239.21 | |
| Cents | 6,618 | 173.10 | |
| Cessange | 5,214 | 657.83 | |
| Clausen | 1,050 | 36.06 | |
| Dommeldange | 3,106 | 235.56 | |
| Eich | 3,079 | 63.18 | |
| Gare | 11,292 | 105.26 | |
| Gasperich | 10,282 | 445.14 | |
| Grund | 983 | 30.03 | |
| Hamm | 1,606 | 407.62 | |
| Hollerich | 7,751 | 160.01 | |
| Kirchberg | 10,982 | 336.84 | |
| Limpertsberg | 11,593 | 157.07 | |
| Merl | 6,602 | 242.81 | |
| Muhlenbach | 2,528 | 311.13 | |
| Neudorf-Weimershof | 7,178 | 248.93 | |
| Pfaffenthal | 1,380 | 37.52 | |
| Pulvermuhl | 386 | 24.82 | |
| Rollingergrund-North Belair | 4,898 | 633.87 | |
| Ville Haute | 3,513 | 105.90 | |
| Weimerskirch | 2,471 | 110.51 | |

== See also ==
- Quarters of Esch-sur-Alzette
