= List of rivers of Luxembourg =

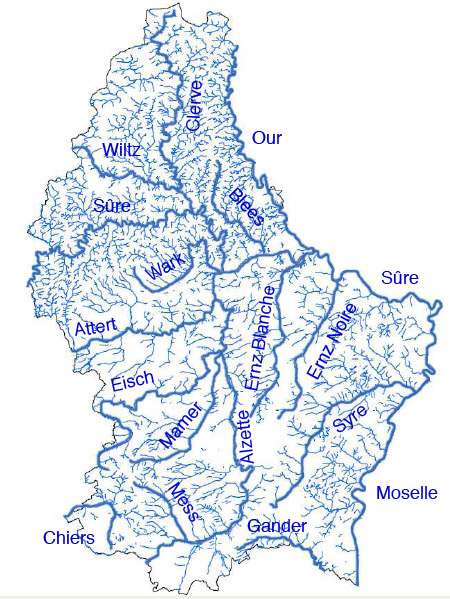
Rivers of Luxembourg

These are the main rivers of Luxembourg.

All of Luxembourg's rivers are drained into the North Sea, most via the river Moselle, except in the extreme south-west of the country, which are drained by the Chiers. Rivers that flow into the sea are sorted alphabetically. Rivers that flow into other rivers are sorted by the proximity of their points of confluence to the sea. Some rivers (e.g. Meuse, Rhine) do not flow through Luxembourg themselves, but they are mentioned for having tributaries from Luxembourg. They are given in italics. For an alphabetical list of rivers of Luxembourg see Category:Rivers of Luxembourg.

- Meuse (main branch at Stellendam, Netherlands)
  - Chiers (at Bazeilles, France)
- Rhine (main branch at Hook of Holland, Netherlands)
  - Moselle (at Koblenz, Germany)
    - Sauer (at Wasserbillig)
      - Black Ernz (at Grundhof)
      - White Ernz (at Reisdorf)
      - Our (at Wallendorf)
      - Blees (at Bettendorf)
      - Alzette (at Ettelbruck)
        - Wark (at Ettelbruck)
        - Attert (at Colmar-Berg)
        - Eisch (at Mersch)
        - Mamer (at Mersch)
        - Pétrusse (at Luxembourg City)
        - Mess (at Bergem)
      - Wiltz (at Goebelsmuhle)
        - Clerve (Woltz) (at Kautenbach)
    - Syre (at Mertert)
    - Gander (Aalbaach) (in Haute-Kontz, France)
