= Limpach =

Limpach may refer to several places:

- Limpach, Luxembourg, in the commune of Reckange-sur-Mess
- Limpach (Bodensee), in the district of Bodensee, Baden-Württemberg
- Limpach, Switzerland, in the Canton of Bern
- Limpach (river) that flows down to the Emme river.
