= Lameschmillen =

Coordinates: 49°30′48″N 6°02′35″E

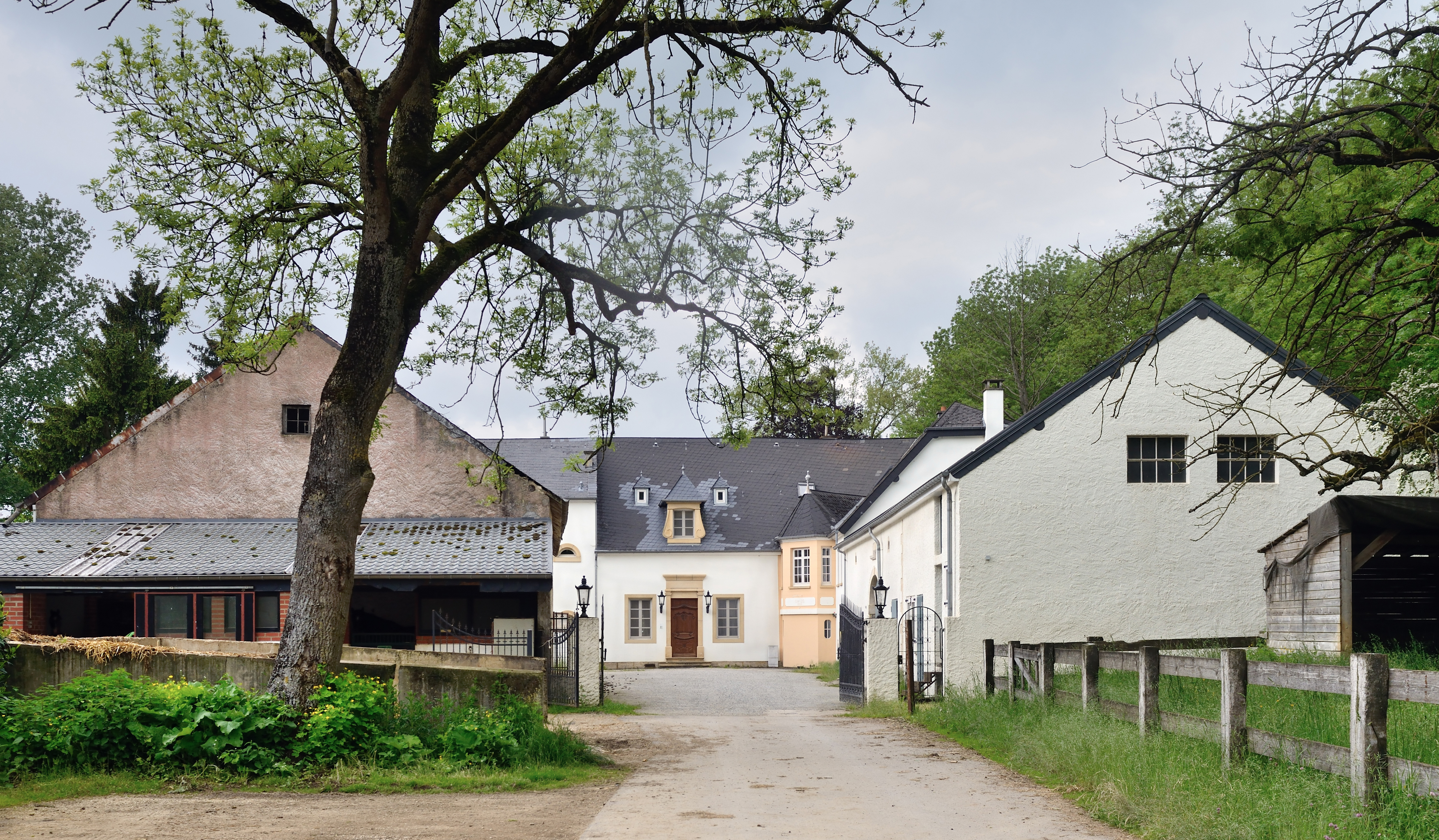
Lameschmillen

Lameschmillen, also known as the Bergemer Mühle, is located halfway between Bergem and Noertzange (Commune of Mondercange), at the confluence of the rivers Alzette and Mess. It is one of three watermills in Luxembourg with the same name. It marks the southern limit of the Dumontshaff Project at Dumontshaff/Dumontshof which converted a stretch of the upper Alzette into a nature reserve. The area is rich in wildlife, especially waterbirds.

There has been a mill at the same site since at least the twelfth century when, along with Esch, Mittendal and Bergem it formed part of the parish (forerunner of the Commune) of Schifflange. Existing buildings date from the 17th, 18th and 19th centuries, with further alterations in the 20th and 21st centuries.

At some point the Lamesch or Lamers family must have managed the mill, giving rise to its name, but this cannot have later than the seventeenth century because the continuous records from 1700 make no mention of the involvement of this family.

1530: Johanna de Mercy built the moated castle of Mittendal at Bergem, to which the rights over the Lamescher Mill belonged.

1664: A stone bearing this date was found in the millers cottage.

1700: Marie-Marguerite Bosch (Widow Gennetais) and Ludwina Petronella Bosch (Widow of Colonel Sébastien-François de Stassin, Governor of Bethune and Seigneur of Brandenbourg Castle, died 1684), daughters of Florent de Bosch and Marguérite de Vigneul, let Lameschmühle to Jean Eydt and Marguerite Berchem.

1712: Lease signed between by Ludwina Petronella de Bosch in favour of Paul Schweich, husband of her daughter Ludwina Petronella Eydt. It can be deduced that Jean Eydt was Ludwina Petronella de Bosch's second husband.

1719: Paul Schweich marries Johanna Nicholas, meaning that Ludwina Petronella Eydt had died by now.

1723: Paul Schweich marries Catherine Calmes.

1731: Marie-Marguerite de Stassin (Widow of Charles-Bernard du Bost-Moulin, elder daughter of Ludvine Petronella Bosch by her first husband) lets Lameschmühle to Nicolas Kribs of Huncherange.

1743: Wilhelm Franck of the Lamescher Mühle marries Anna Helena Reuter of Altwies.

1759: Ludovine Petronilla du Bost, Countess de Chanclos (daughter of Marie Marguerite de Stassin, wife of Field Marshal Charles-Urban de Chanclos) leases the mill to Theodore Franck, son of Guillaume Franck and Madeleine Krips.

1765: Anna Franck of the Lameschmühle marries Nicholas Zeller of Budersberg.

1766: The Land Registry of the Empress Maria Theresa lists Theodore Franck as the Miller.

1768: Stable building erected.

1776: A door lintel of this date found in the Miller's cottage, with T. FA - 17 ihs 76 O. C.? inscribed. By this time the Franck family owned the Mill outright.

1777: The Ferraris Map marks the mill as Lammeischer Muhlen. Today's rectangular configuration of the buildings is clearly visible, though still as separate buildings.

1820: Bastien Klensch of Bergem and Krips of the Udinger Mill take the Miller Michel Franck, son of Theodore Franck, to court, because Franck had raised the level of his waterwheel and the depth of the mill-race. It was decided that the mill-race should be lowered by 47 inches along its entire length. A sluice must be put back in the mill-race. This must be open for at least a full day to clean the by-flow, and for other specified reasons. It was forbidden to obstruct the race or the sluice. On the first Sunday of each January, April, July and October all the sluices must be open all day. In September the mill-race and canal must be thoroughly cleaned.

1824: The land register names the Widow of Michel Franck as owner.

1876: A new mill building was built (the door lintel was dated and initialled MP 1881 ML) with a turbine underneath.

1904: The owner was Peter Müller.

1922: Gustav Wilhelm and his wife Josephine Scheltgen purchase the mill at auction on 15 February, from the estate of Peter Müller. Wilhelm recalled that on his first evening at the mill upon taking possession, he shouted aloud to express his joy, knowing that all around him was his land, and nobody in earshot. Josephine's sister Elise and her husband, Theodore Diederich, also lived on the property. They named their son Gustav after his uncle, and he in due course inherited the mill. New living quarters constructed between the Stable and the miller's cottage; a turret added with initials GW-1922-JS.

1940: The mill was temporarily taken over by the German Army. Stores hidden by the Wilhelm and Diederich families (behind a false wall where the Mazout now stands) were not discovered. One of the mill's four dray horses was commandeered.

1960: Milling of wheat ceased; milling for fodder continued.

1961: Gustave Diederich sells Lameschmillen to Paul Brockmeyer and Marianne Bauler

1970: All milling ceased, when the Brockmeyers took to commercial stabling. Additional adjacent land was acquired by them in 1973, 1981 and 1990. The whole property was divided into two - the Stables and the Domaine.

2004: The mill, cottage and corner building with turret amalgamated to form a single dwelling. Facade of the cottage building altered to include a front door and two large ground floor windows, with a gabled window above.

2016: The Biddinger family sells the riding school.
