= Grund elevator =

Public elevator in Luxembourg City, Luxembourg

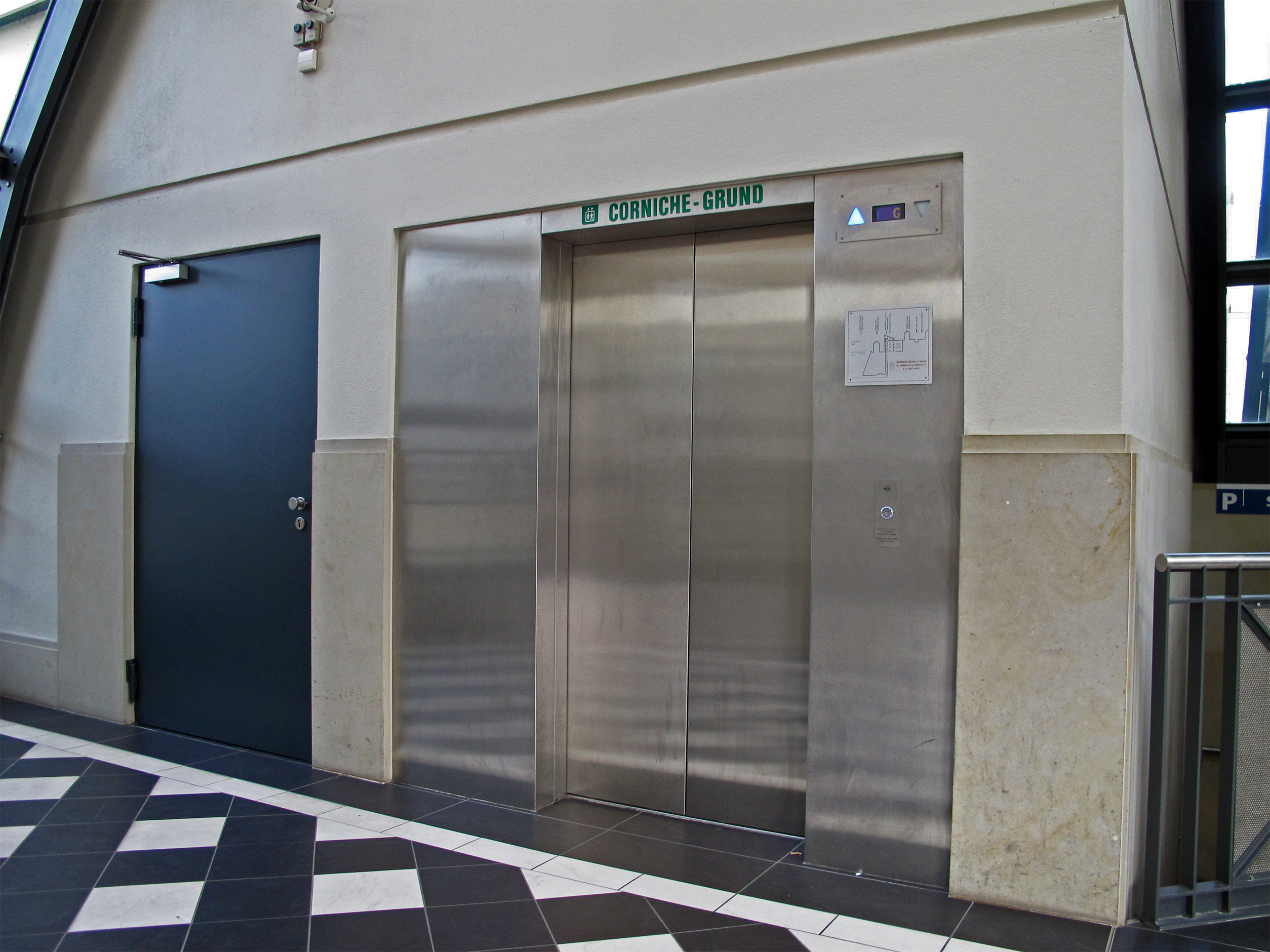
The upper entrance of the elevator on the Plateau Saint-Esprit

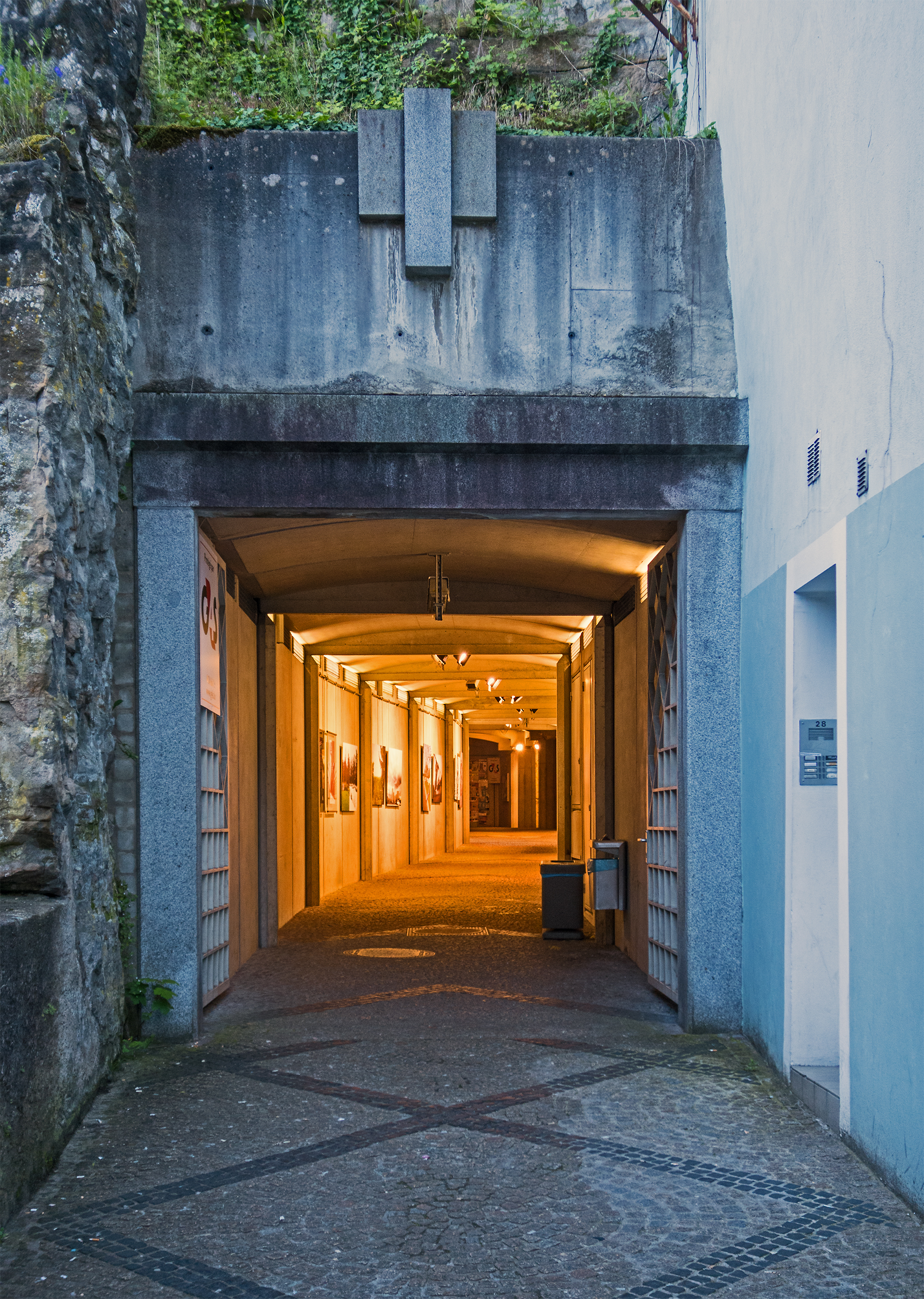
The tunnel leading to the elevator from the Grund

The Grund elevator (Luxembourgish: Lift Gronn-Uewerstad) is one of two public elevators in Luxembourg City, Luxembourg. It links the Cité Judiciaire on Plateau Saint-Esprit in the Ville Haute quarter to the Grund quarter in the Alzette valley below.

== History ==
The idea for a lift in this location dates back to 1945. The Grund elevator went into service on 20 March 1987. The project cost 60 million Luxembourg francs

The 55 meter long gallery leading from the Grund to the elevator has been decorated with numerous works of art since 1998, in an effort to brighten up a place that was considered grim and unwelcoming.

The shelter housing the elevator on the Plateau Saint-Esprit was demolished in March 2010 and replaced by a new structure providing easier access to the elevator.

The elevator was closed for three weeks in October and November 2025 in order to undergo major renovation. During that time, a shuttle bus was used as a replacement.

== Characteristics ==
The elevator links the Plateau Saint-Esprit in the Ville Haute to Op der Schmëdd square in the Grund via an underground gallery 55 m long. It also serves the Corniche and level -4 of the underground car park built under the plateau at the same time as the lift. The lift is 45 m high and the cabin, which is 2.40 m long and 2.60 m wide, can accommodate 15 people and the maximum load limit is 25 people or 1,675 kg.

The command panel reads as follows:

- Niveau 0 : Ville-Haute;
- Niveau -1 : Parking, Rue Saint-Esprit;
- Niveau -4 : Parking;
- Niveau G : Grund.

The elevator is accessible free of charge to pedestrians and cyclists, every day from 06:30 to 02:00, and even until 04:00 on Friday and Saturday.
