= Mosconi (restaurant) =

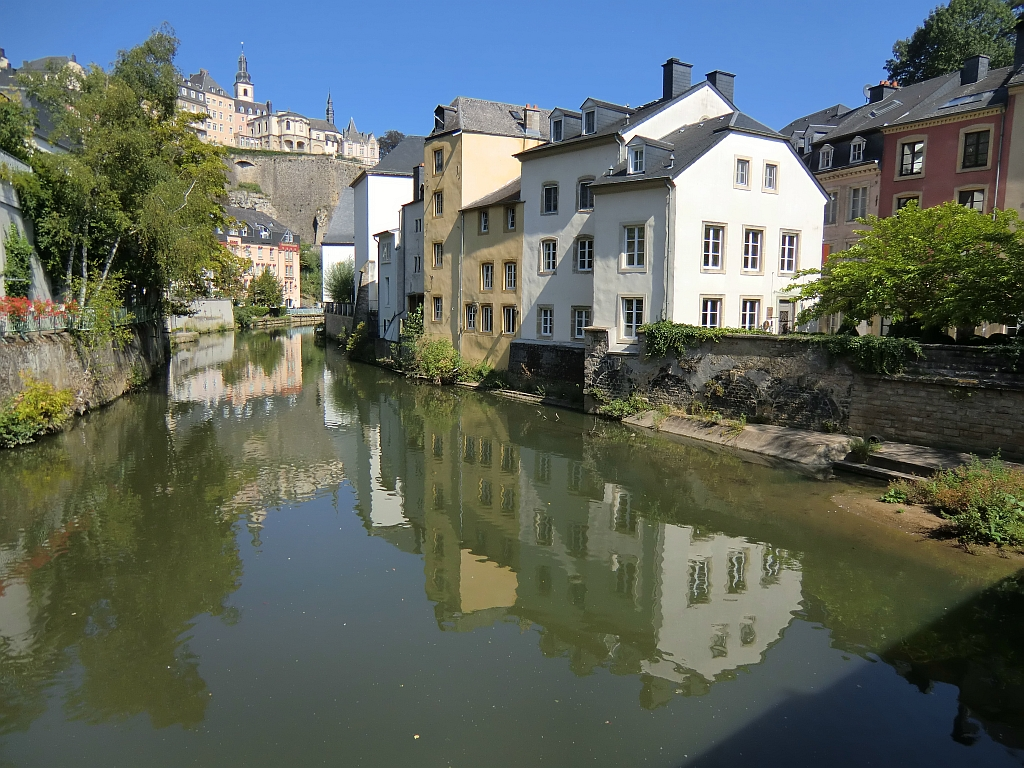
- Mosconi, the whitewashed building, in Luxembourg's Grund
- Interactive map of Mosconi

Restaurant information
- Location: 13 Rue Münster, 2160, Luxembourg City, Luxembourg
- Coordinates: 49°36′32.3″N 06°08′08.9″E
- Website: www.mosconi.lu

Mosconi is an Italian restaurant located at 13 rue Munster in the Grund district of Luxembourg City, Luxembourg, overlooking the river Alzette. Headed by Italian chef Ilario Mosconi, it is one of the Relais & Châteaux series of hotels and gourmet restaurants from around the world.

Mosconi became the first Italian restaurant to receive a Michelin star in Benelux. From 2005 to 2014, it had two Michelin stars, but the rating has since dropped to one star.

== The restaurant ==
The restaurant was established by Ilario Mosconi, a native of Ponte di Legno near Brescia who moved to Luxembourg at the age of 13. He received a Michelin star for Domus in 1997, then a star for Mosconi in 2000, followed by a second star for Mosconi in 2005. The restaurant is located near an old stone bridge on a south-facing sitting terrace with a view of the Alzette. Simonetta Mosconi, Illario's wife, attends to the management of the restaurant.

The menu is an eight-course set menu of pasta dishes mainly prepared with imported Italian ingredients. Beef from Tuscany, veal from the Piedmont, tomatoes from Sicily, and white truffles from Alba, combined with basil and ricotta are among the dishes served.

== Reception ==
The restaurant has a Michelin star in the "Bib Gourmand" category for 2014. Illario Mosconi was one of the first chefs to gain the distinction for an Italian restaurant outside of Italy.

Michelin describes the food as "Italian cuisine full of panache, a firework of flavors!". Fodor's cites it as the top restaurant in the Grand Duchy, and one of the best Italian restaurants outside Italy. Tim Skelton of Bradt Travel Guides highlights the tuna ice cream specialty, which is "more palatable than it sounds".

== See also ==
- List of Italian restaurants
