= Ehlange-sur-Mess =

Town in the commune of Reckange-sur-Mess in Luxembourg

Coordinates: 49°32′53″N 6°00′53″E

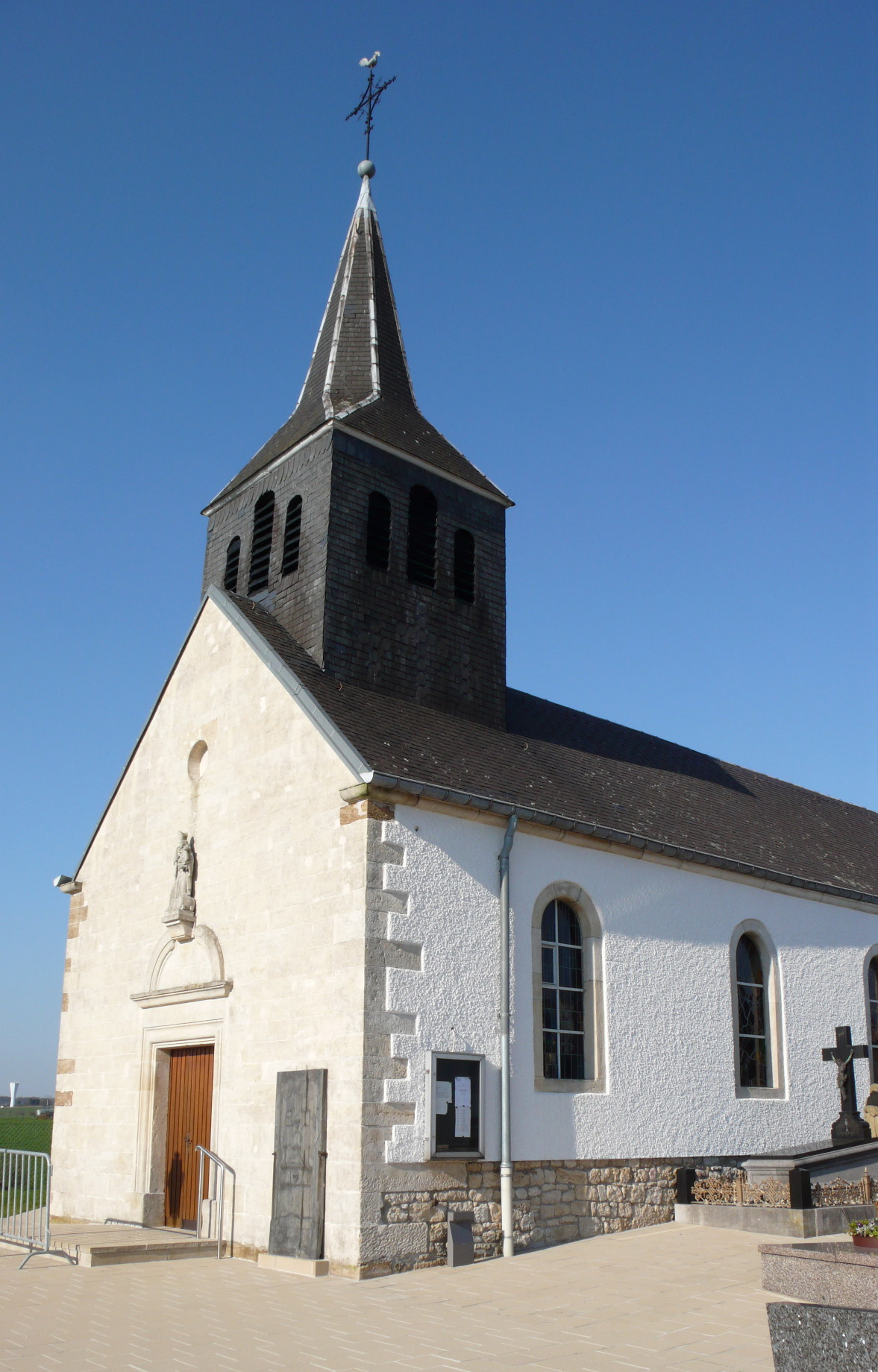

Ehlange-sur-Mess (French pronunciation: [elɑ̃ʒ syʁ mɛs], lit. 'Ehlange on Mess'; Luxembourgish: Éiléng, German: Ehlingen [ˈeːlɪŋən]) is a small town in the commune of Reckange-sur-Mess, in south-western Luxembourg. As of September 2026, the town has a population of 675.

It is situated on the Mess River, from which its suffix is derived.
