= Wark (river) =

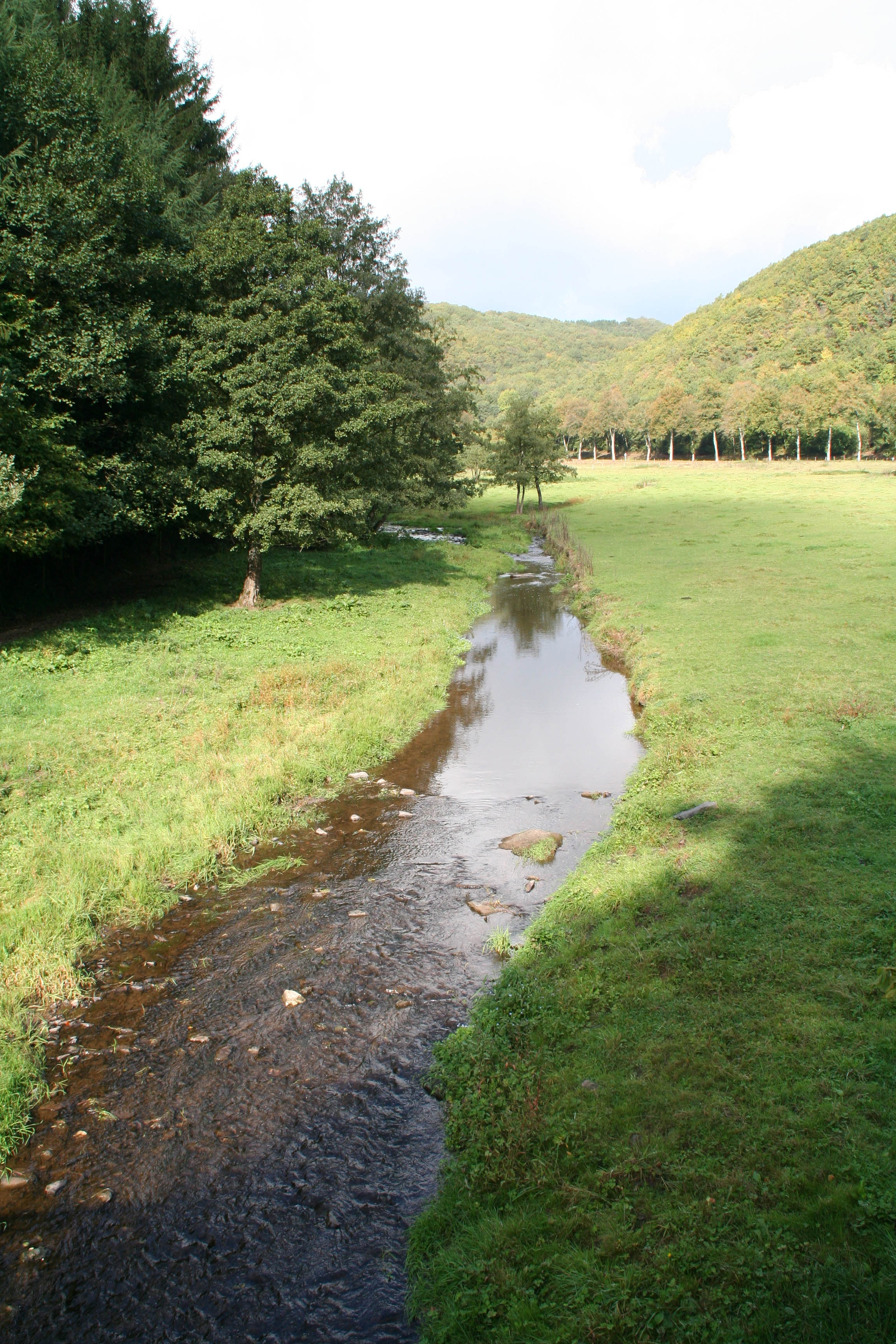

Location
- Country: Luxembourg

Physical characteristics
- Source
  - location: Grevels
- Mouth: Alzette
  - location: Ettelbruck
  - coordinates: 49.8458°N 6.1065°E
- Length: 28 km (17 mi)

Basin features
- Progression: Alzette→ Sauer→ Moselle→ Rhine→ North Sea

The Wark (Luxembourgish: Waark) is a river in Diekirch, Luxembourg, joining the Alzette at Ettelbruck. It flows through the towns of Mertzig, Feulen, Welscheid and Warken.
