= De Mercy =

De Mercy is a French locational surname, derived from places called Mercy in France.

== Origins ==
The De Mercy family rose to increasing power during the Middle Ages in the region of what is now southern Belgium, Lorraine and Luxembourg. By the fifteenth century Jean de Mercy was lord of Clémarais (1422); in 1477, Roger de Mercy ("the Valiant") was appointed Captain and Provost of Longwy by René II, Duke of Lorraine.

The family progressively expanded their domain, incorporating parts of Aix-sur-Cloie, Battincourt and Piémont. A castle named Claimaraix is mentioned in a document dated 3 March 1612, as a possession of Anne de Landres, widow of Jean de Mercy. By the sixteenth century they owned substantial land near Esch, including the castle at Mittenthal and the important mill at Bergem.

== People ==
- Count Claudius Florimund de Mercy (1666–1734), French general
- Eugène-Guillaume Argenteau, comte de Mercy (1743–1819), Austrian general
- Florimond Claude, comte de Mercy-Argenteau (1727–1794), Austrian diplomat
- Marie-Clotilde-Elisabeth Louise de Riquet, comtesse de Mercy-Argenteau (1837–1890), Belgian noblewoman
