= Louisa de Mercy-Argenteau =

Marie-Clotilde-Elisabeth Louise de Riquet
- Countess of Marcy-Argenteau
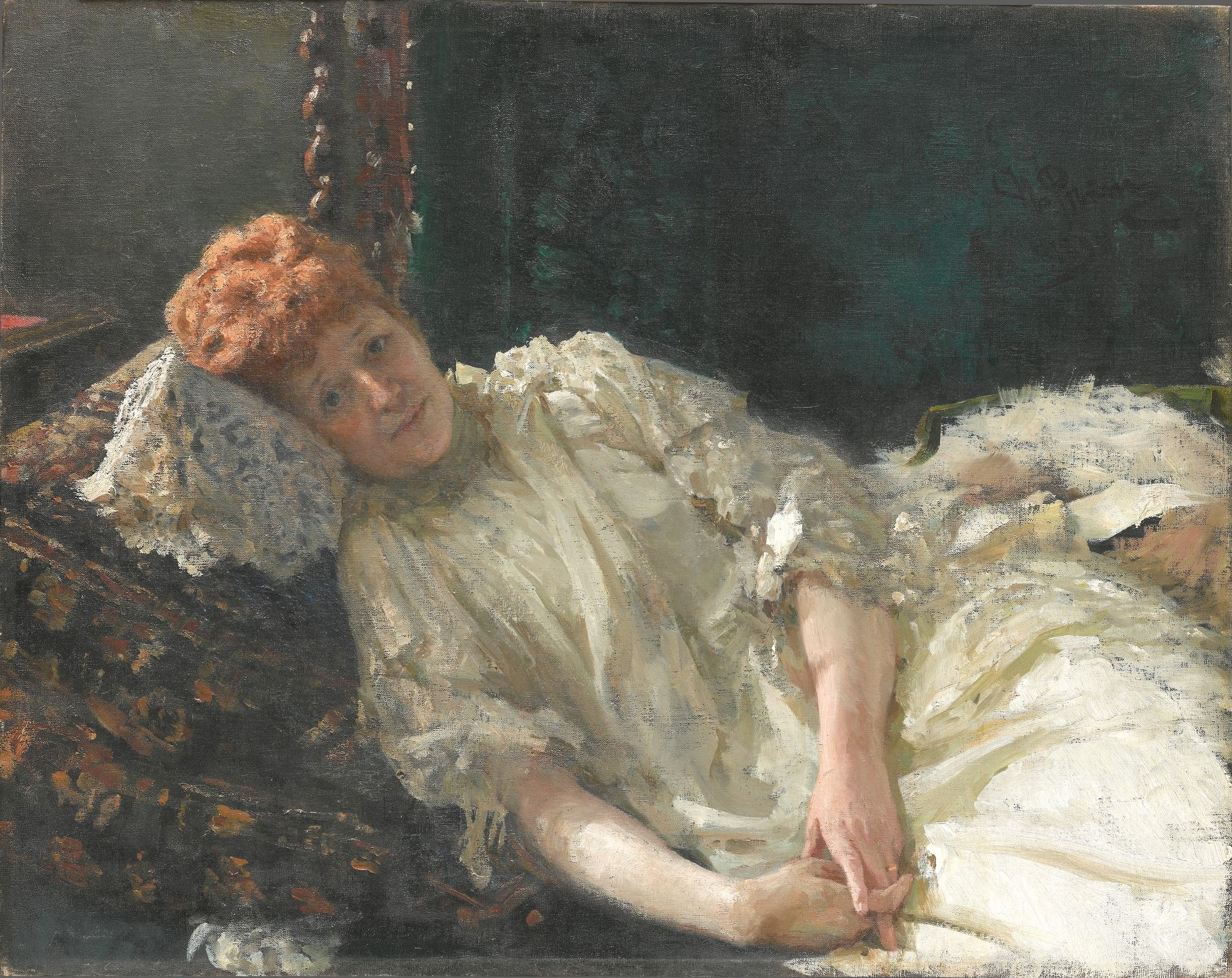
- Portrait by Ilya Repin (1890)
- Born: 3 June 1837
- Died: 8 November 1890 (aged 53); Saint Petersburg, Russian Empire

Marie-Clotilde-Elisabeth Louise de Riquet (3 June 1837 – 8 November 1890) known as Louisa de Mercy-Argenteau, was a Belgian pianist. She was the eldest daughter of Michel Gabriel Alphonse Ferdinand de Riquet (1810–1865), created prince de Chimay 1834, for himself only, and Rosalie de Riquet de Caraman (1814–1872)

== Life ==
In childhood she developed considerable aptitude as a pianist. On 11 April 1860 she married Eugène Arnould Henri Charles François Marie, comte de Mercy-Argenteau (22 August 1838 – 2 May 1888). She met Franz Liszt the next year. In 1866, she met emperor Napoleon III and befriended him. After his defeat at the Battle of Sedan, she visited him for a last time when he was a prisoner of the Prussians at Schloss Wilhelmshöhe and consoled him playing music. She later wrote a book about their four-year relationship, The Last Love of an Emperor.

In the early 1880s, she developed an interest in Russian music. This led to her studying the Russian language, translating some vocal music by several Russian composers, and arranging concerts and recitals of their music. Her advocacy of music by The Mighty Handful favored that of César Cui and facilitated the production of the latter's opera Prisoner of the Caucasus in Liège in 1886. Cui's collection of piano pieces entitled À Argenteau is a musical reminiscence of the count and countess' estate in Belgium. La Comtesse de Mercy-Argenteau died of cancer on 8 November 1890 in Saint Petersburg, Russia.

== Writings ==
- César Cui: esquisse critique. Paris: Fischbacher, 1888.
- The Last Love of an Emperor: reminiscences of the Comtesse Louise de Mercy-Argenteau, née Princesse de Caraman-Chimay, describing her association with the Emperor Napoléon III and the social and political part she played at the close of the Second Empire. Garden City, N.Y., Doubleday, Page & Co., 1926.
