= Bourscheid, Luxembourg =

Bourscheid Buerschent (Luxembourgish) Burscheid (German)
- Commune
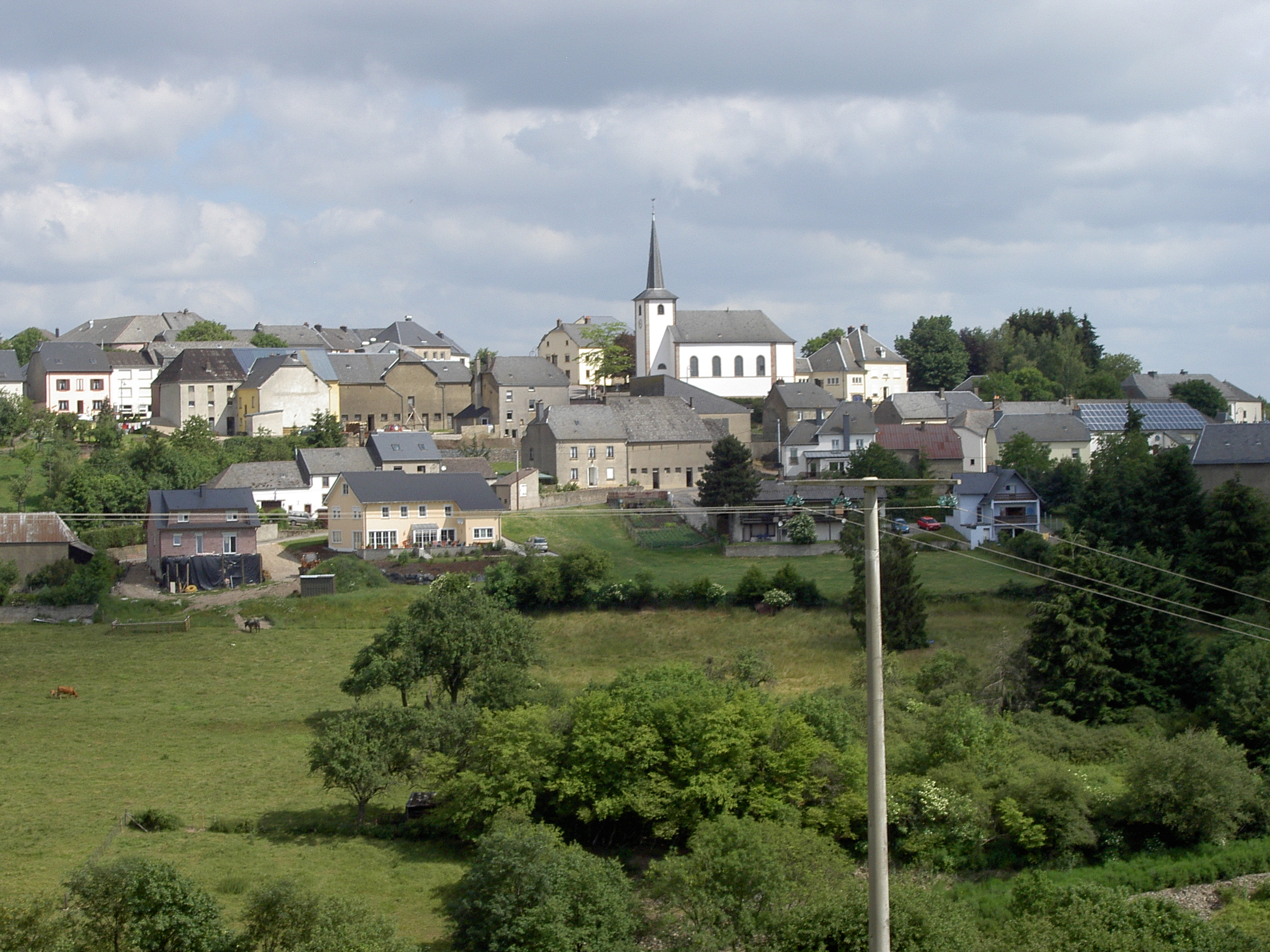

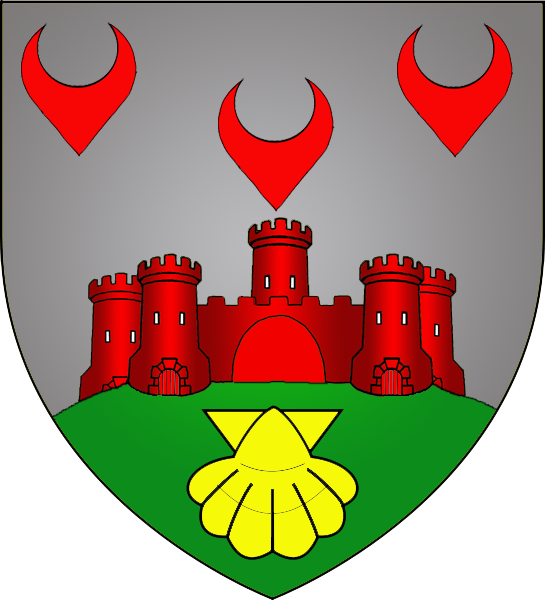
- Coat of arms

- Map of Luxembourg with Bourscheid highlighted in orange, the rest of the Diekirch canton in red
- Coordinates: 49.909167°N 6.062778°E
- Country: Luxembourg
- Canton: Diekirch

Government
  - Mayor: Annie Nickels-Theis (Independent)

Area
  - Total: 36.86 km^{2} (14.23 sq mi)
  - Rank: 17th of 100
- Highest elevation: 513 m (1,683 ft)
  - Rank: 17th of 100
- Lowest elevation: 207 m (679 ft)
  - Rank: 27th of 100

Population (2026)
  - Total: 1,794
  - Rank: 87th of 100
  - Density: 48.67/km^{2} (126.1/sq mi)
  - Rank: 96th of 100
- Time zone: UTC+1 (CET)
  - Summer (DST): UTC+2 (CEST)
- LAU 2: LU0000602

Bourscheid (Luxembourgish: Buerschent [ˈbuːɐ̯ʃənt]; German: Burscheid) is a commune and small town in north-eastern Luxembourg. It is part of the canton of Diekirch, which is part of the district of Diekirch.

As of September 2026, the town of Bourscheid, which lies in the centre of the commune, had a population of 444. Other settlements within the commune include Goebelsmuhle, Lipperscheid, Michelau, Schlindermanderscheid, and Welscheid.

Bourscheid Castle located close to the village is considered one of the most important medieval castles between the Meuse and the Rhine.

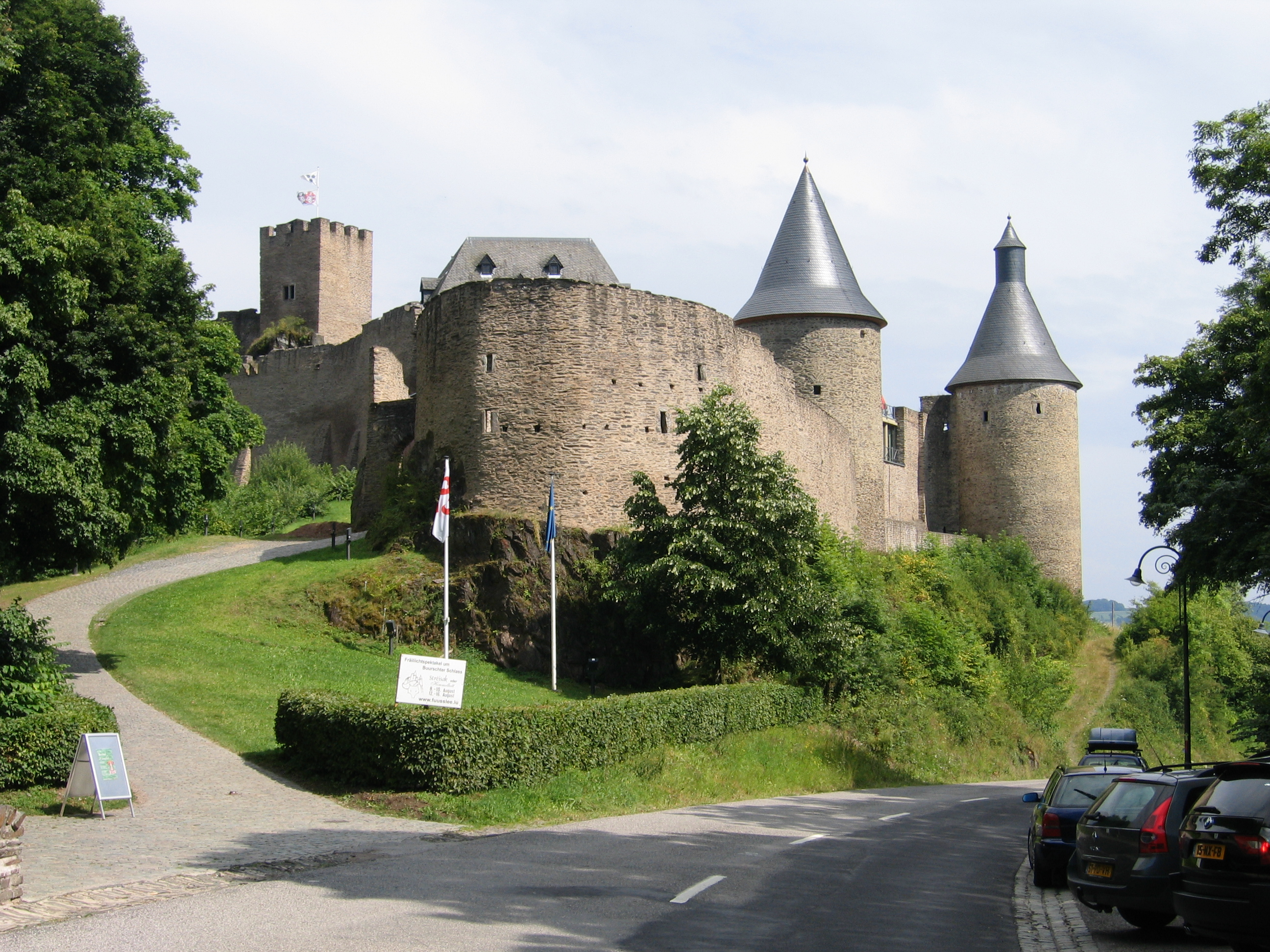
Bourscheid Castle

== Population ==
Historical population

Year	Pop.	±%
1821	1,127	—
1851	1,951	+73.1%
1900	1,606	−17.7%
1910	1,589	−1.1%
1922	1,479	−6.9%
1935	1,293	−12.6%

Year	Pop.	±%
1947	1,147	−11.3%
1960	1,026	−10.5%
1970	966	−5.8%
1981	924	−4.3%
1990	1,051	+13.7%
2000	1,072	+2.0%

Year	Pop.	±%
2005	1,232	+14.9%
2010	1,317	+6.9%
2015	1,647	+25.1%
2020	1,718	+4.3%
2021	1,701	−1.0%

Source data
