= Schlindermanderscheid =

Coordinates: 49°56′N 6°04′E

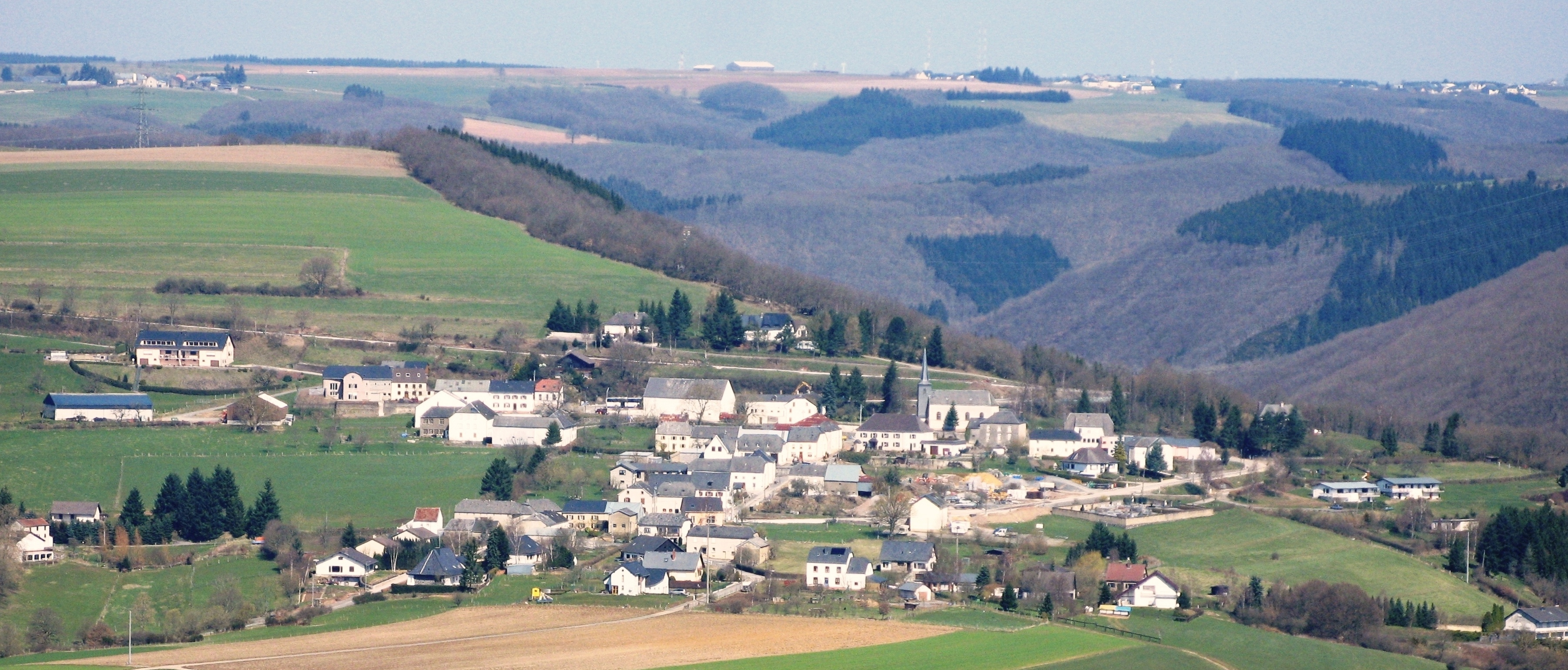
Schlindermanderscheid seen from the height of Bourscheid

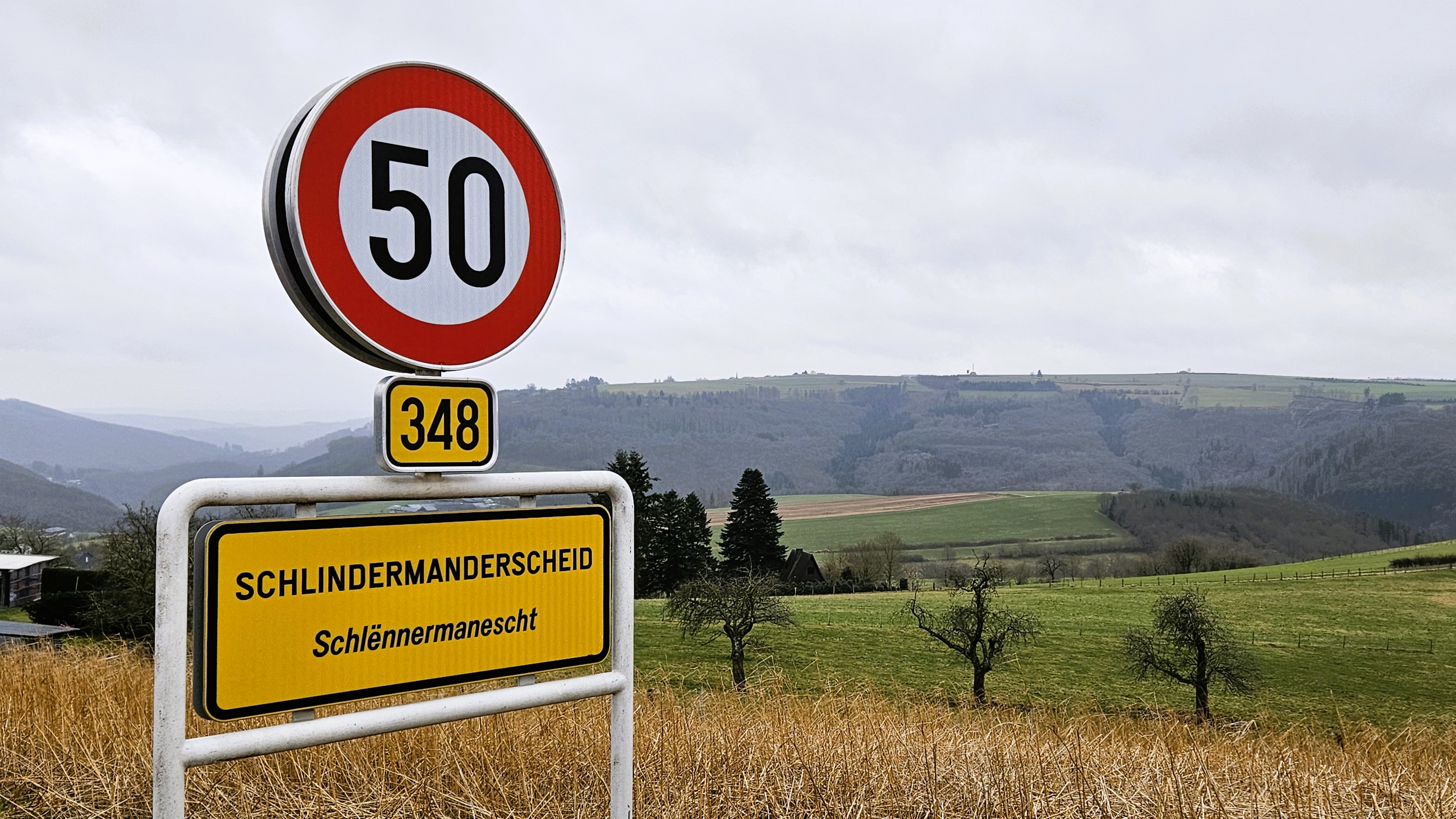
Entrance sign to Schlindermanderscheid

Schlindermanderscheid (German pronunciation: [ˈʃlɪndɐˌmandɐʃaɪt]; Luxembourgish: Schlënnermanescht) is a village in the commune of Bourscheid, in north-eastern Luxembourg. As of September 2026, the village had a population of 134. At 21 letters, it bears the longest place name in Luxembourg.
