= Aloyse Hentgen =

Luxembourgish politician (1894–1953)

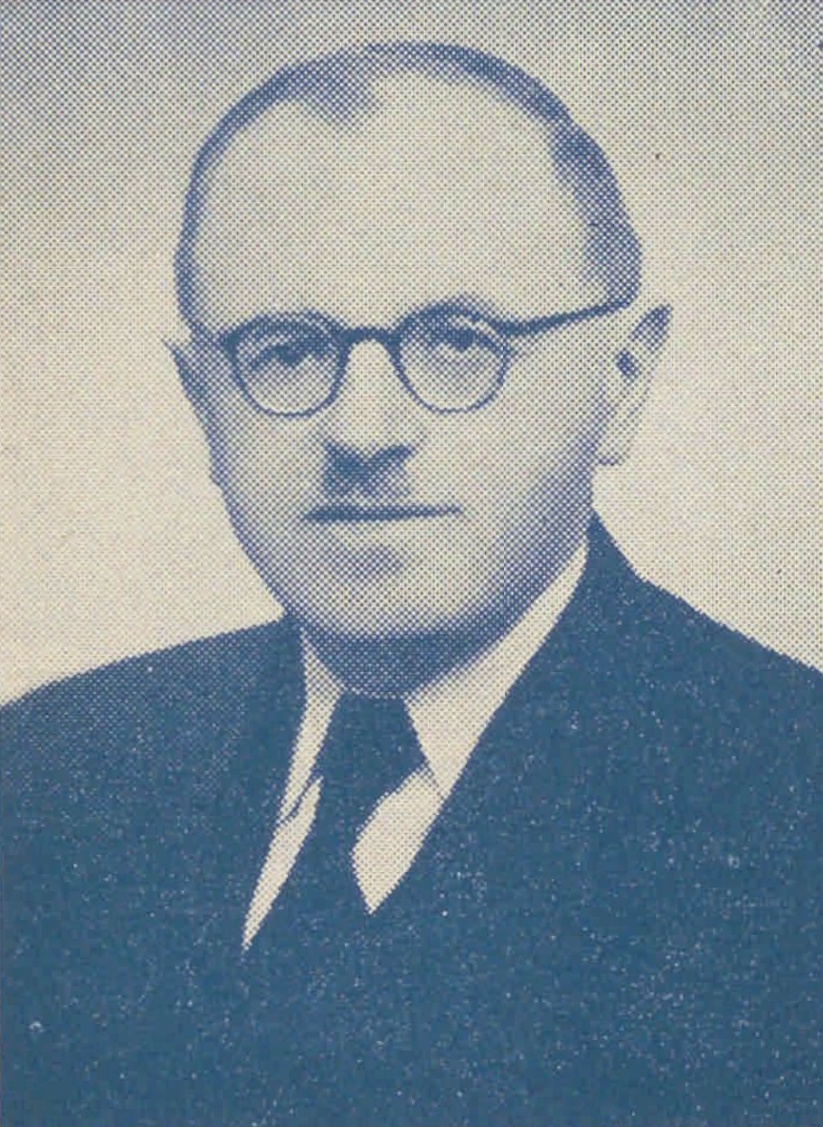
Hentgen c. 1948

Aloyse Hentgen (16 July 1894 – 1 December 1953) was a Luxembourgish politician.

== Early life and education ==
He was born in Roedgen. From 1913 to 1916 he studied law in Paris and Fribourg. On 13 July 1917 he became a member of the bar in Luxembourg.

== Career ==
On 29 February 1920 he was a co-founder of the first Luxembourgish insurance company, La Luxembourgeoise. He became president of its supervisory board, then from 1923 managing director of the insurance division, and from 1933, managing director of the banking division.

On 10 December 1933, he co-founded the Luxembourgish Basketball Federation, and was president of its committee from 1933 to 1936.

He was also an avid supporter of the Scout movement. Before World War II he was the head Scout in Luxembourg, and from 1944 to 1948 was Commissaire général of the Federation of Luxembourgish Scouts.

His main area of activity, however, was in politics. In 1917 he was president of the "Akademikerveräin" (Academics' Society), a student organisation which was officially independent, but was close to the Party of the Right, and its successor party, the CSV. He was described as "Catholic and nationalist". He attempted to defend Grand-Duchess Marie-Adélaïde against attacks from the left, and opposed a possible annexation of Luxembourg by Belgium. In 1935 he succeeded Eugène Dondelinger as a Deputy to the Chamber for the Party of the Right in the South district.

In World War II he was disbarred, and was deported to Germany along with his family by the German occupation authorities. He did not however end up in a concentration camp for medical reasons.

== Later life and death ==
After the war, he was the parliamentary chair of the CSV. In 1948/1949 he founded a youth organisation for his party in the South district. On 14 July 1948 he became Minister for the Economy and Agriculture in the Dupong-Schaus-Bodson Ministry. After experiencing a stroke, he felt the need to resign on 2 September 1950.

He died on 1 December 1953.

== Honours ==
- Commander of the Order of the Oak Crown (1952)
- In 1956 he was posthumously awarded the Cross of the Order of the Resistance
