= Lipperscheid =

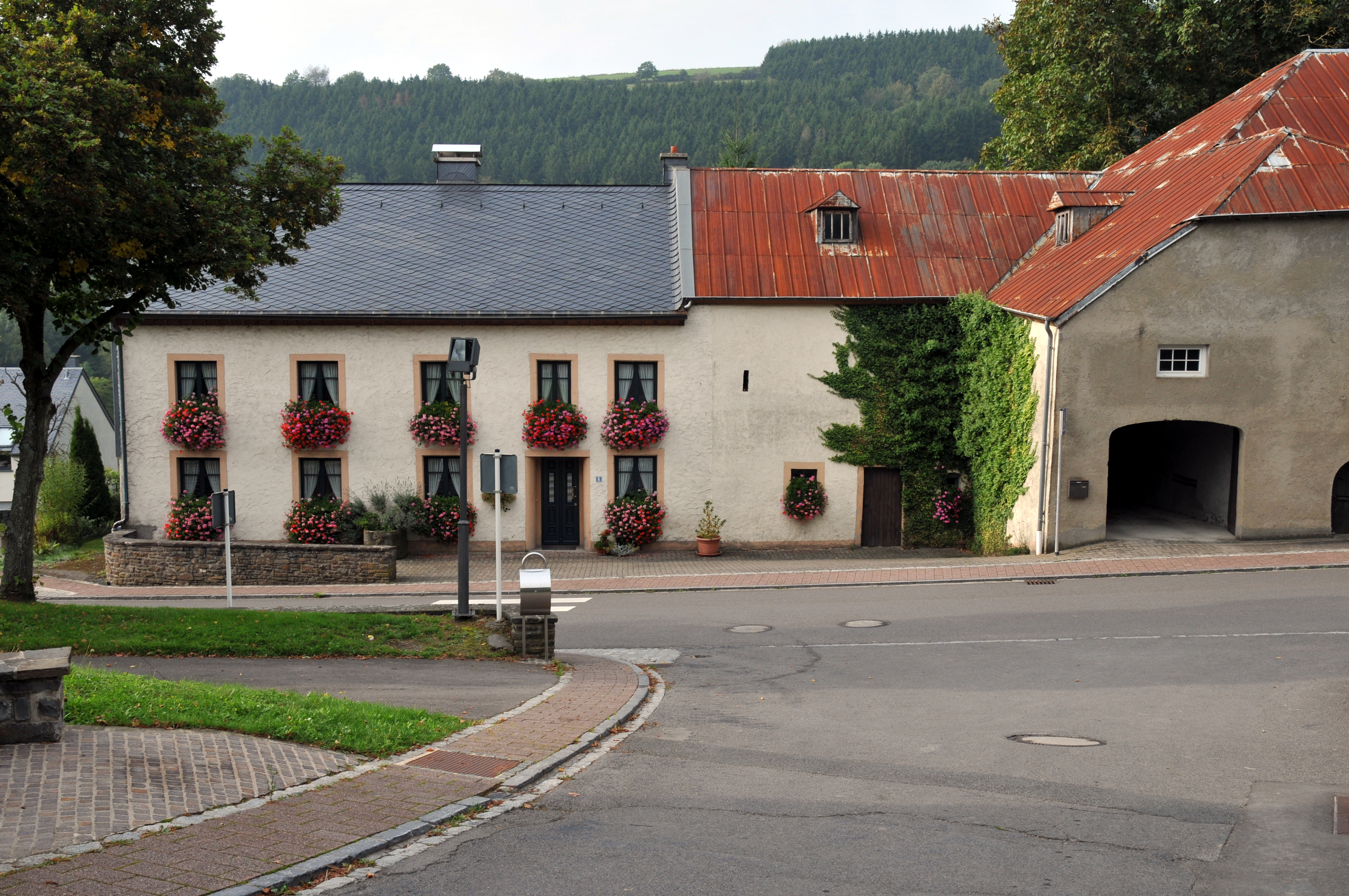
Lipperscheid Main street

Lipperscheid (German pronunciation: [ˈlɪpɐʃaɪt]; Luxembourgish: Lëpschent) is a village in the commune of Bourscheid, in north-eastern Luxembourg. As of September 2026, the village had a population of 298.
