= Gander (Moselle) =

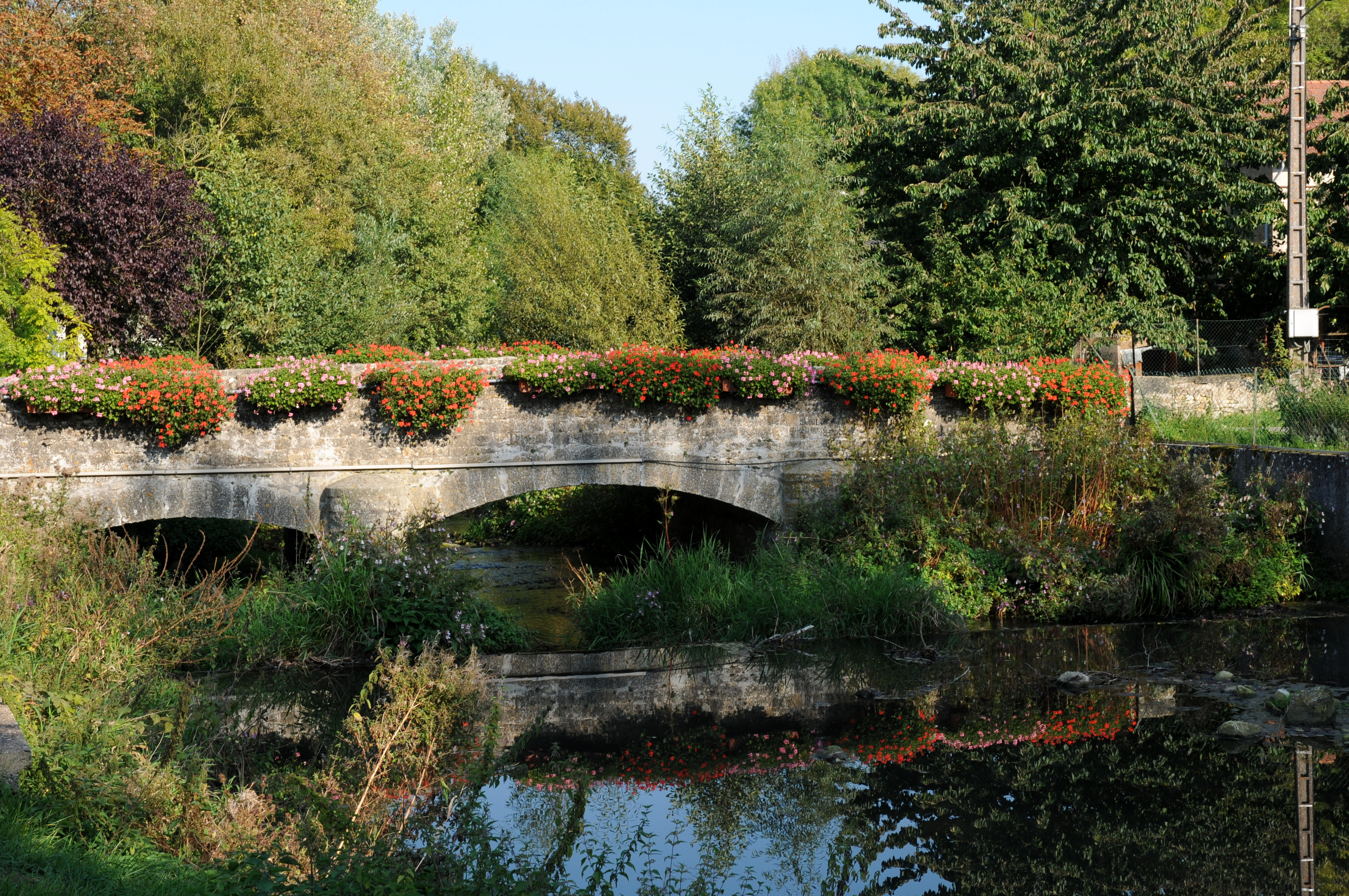
- The Gander in Altwies

- Location within France Location within Grand Est

Location
- Countries: Luxembourg and France

Physical characteristics
- Source
  - location: Southern Luxembourg
- Mouth
  - location: Moselle
  - coordinates: 49°26′56″N 6°19′37″E

Basin features
- Progression: Moselle→ Rhine→ North Sea

The Gander (in French, Altbach in Luxembourguish) is a river that flows in Luxembourg and in the French département Moselle, a tributary of the river Moselle (left side). It is about 20 km (12 mi) long, of which 17 km is in France and on the French-Luxembourgish border. Its source is in the commune of Frisange, southern Luxembourg. It flows generally southeast, and from Altwies until Emerange (commune of Burmerange) it forms the French-Luxembourgish border. From Emerange until its outflow into the Moselle at Haute-Kontz, it flows through France. The largest town on the Gander is Mondorf-les-Bains.
