= Reckange-sur-Mess =

Reckange-sur-Mess Reckeng op der Mess (Luxembourgish) Reckingen (German)
- Commune
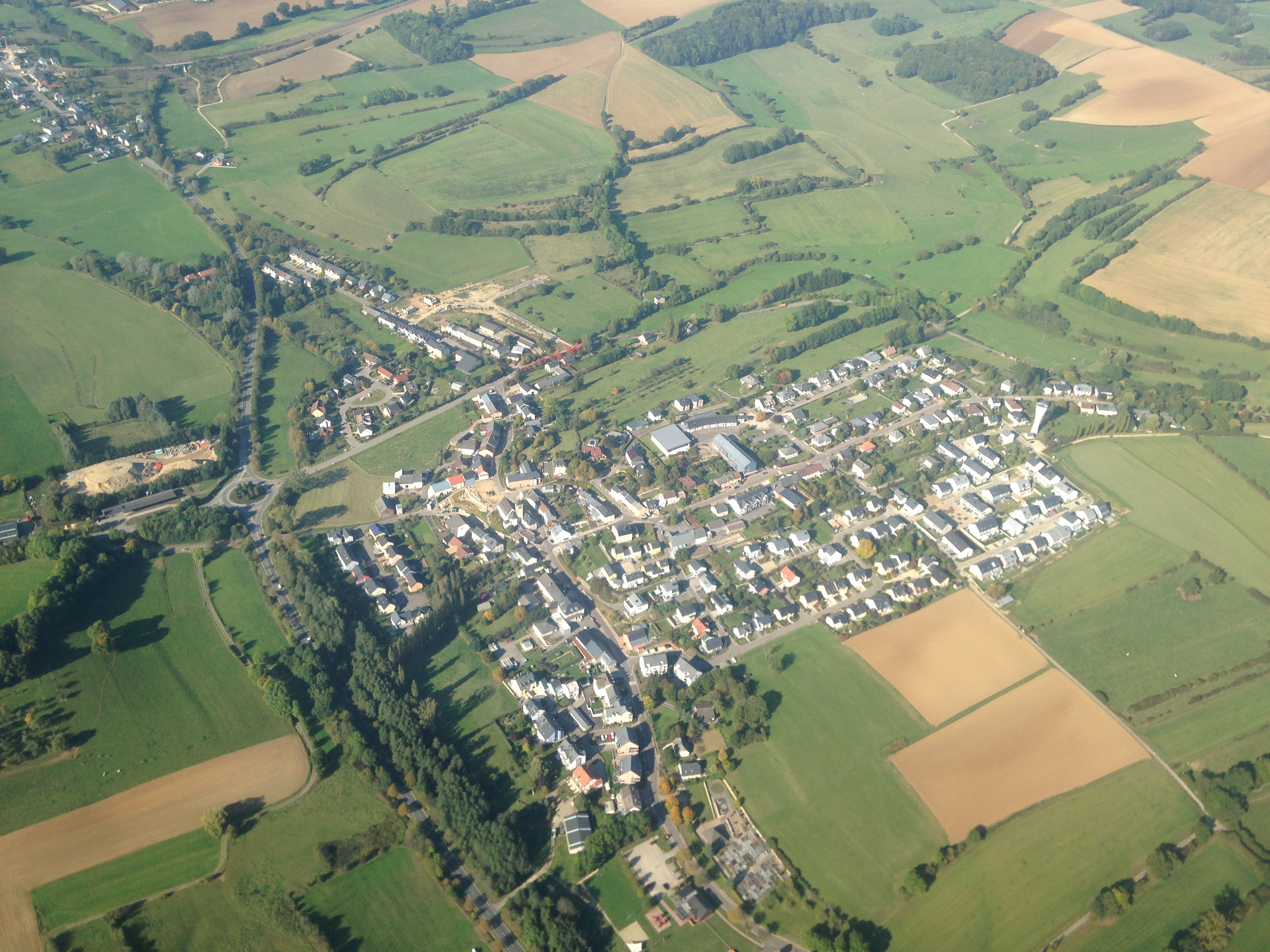
- Aerial view of Reckange-sur-Mess

- Coat of arms

- Map of Luxembourg with Reckange-sur-Mess highlighted in orange, and the canton in dark red
- Coordinates: 49.5611°N 6.0069°E
- Country: Luxembourg
- Canton: Esch-sur-Alzette

Government
  - Mayor: Carlo Muller

Area
  - Total: 20.42 km^{2} (7.88 sq mi)
  - Rank: 56th of 100
- Highest elevation: 368 m (1,207 ft)
  - Rank: 74th of 100
- Lowest elevation: 282 m (925 ft)
  - Rank: 85th of 100

Population (2026)
  - Total: 3,044
  - Rank: 59th of 100
  - Density: 149.1/km^{2} (386.1/sq mi)
  - Rank: 57th of 100
- Time zone: UTC+1 (CET)
  - Summer (DST): UTC+2 (CEST)
- LAU 2: LU0000210
- Website: reckange.lu

Reckange-sur-Mess (French pronunciation: [ʁɛkɑ̃ʒ syʁ mɛs], lit. 'Reckange on Mess'; Luxembourgish: Reckeng op der Mess; German: Reckingen [ˈʁɛkɪŋən]) is a commune and small town in south-western Luxembourg. It is part of the canton of Esch-sur-Alzette.

The town of Reckange-sur-Mess has a population of 1185 as of September 2026.the village has a population of 242. The commune also comprises the villages of Ehlange-sur-Mess, Limpach, Roedgen, Pissange and Wickrange.

It is situated on the Mess River, from which its suffix is derived.

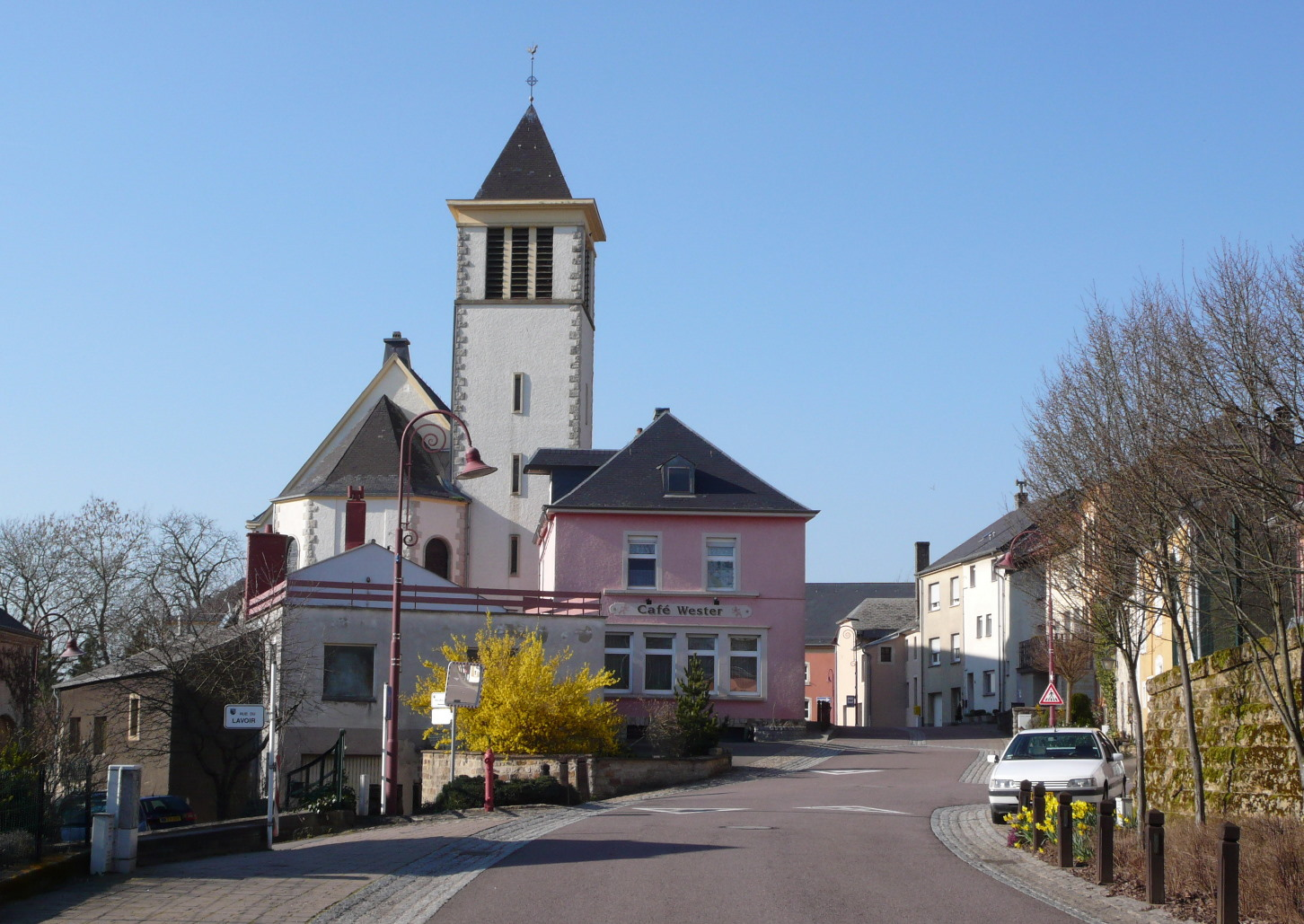
Town center and church

== Population ==
Historical population

Year	Pop.	±%
1821	578	—
1851	945	+63.5%
1900	842	−10.9%
1910	775	−8.0%
1922	806	+4.0%
1935	754	−6.5%

Year	Pop.	±%
1947	722	−4.2%
1960	801	+10.9%
1970	1,052	+31.3%
1981	1,406	+33.7%
1990	1,517	+7.9%
2000	1,730	+14.0%

Year	Pop.	±%
2005	1,910	+10.4%
2010	2,054	+7.5%
2015	2,297	+11.8%
2020	2,594	+12.9%
2021	2,634	+1.5%

Source data

== Notable people ==
- Aloyse Hentgen (1894–1953), a Luxembourgish politician, born in Roedgen.
- Gilles Müller (born 1983), a Luxembourgish tennis player, born in Luxembourg City.
