= Grund, Luxembourg City =

District of Luxembourg City, Luxembourg

Grund Gronn (Luxembourgish)
- District
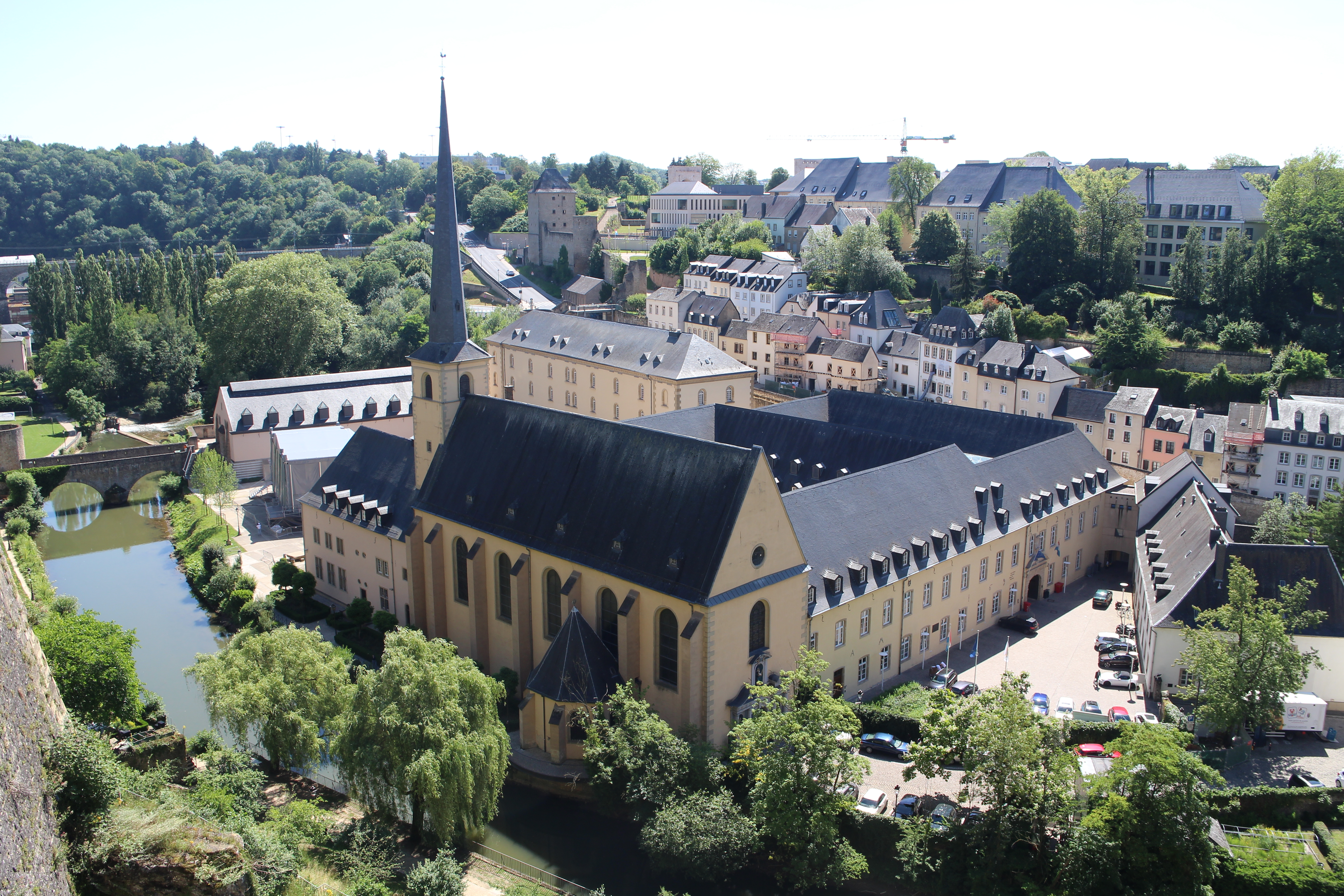
- A view of Neimënster Abbey in the Grund

- The Grund is one of 24 districts in Luxembourg City
- Coordinates: 49.611°N 6.136°E
- Country: Luxembourg
- Commune: Luxembourg City

Area
  - Total: 0.3003 km^{2} (0.1159 sq mi)

Population (31 December 2025)
  - Total: 983
  - Density: 3,270/km^{2} (8,480/sq mi)

Nationality
  - Luxembourgish: 43.74%
  - Other: 56.26%
- Website: Grund

The Grund (German pronunciation: [ɡʁʊnt]; Luxembourgish: Gronn, pronounced [ɡʀon]) is a district in central Luxembourg City, in southern Luxembourg. It is located in the valley below the centre of Luxembourg City on the banks of the Alzette river. In addition to being a picturesque area, it is a popular nightlife area that can be accessed by foot or via an elevator which descends through the cliff.

As of 31 December 2025, the district has a relatively small population of 983 inhabitants, of whom 43.74% are Luxembourgers. The Grund is home to Mosconi, a one-star Michelin restaurant which specialises in pasta.

== Gallery ==
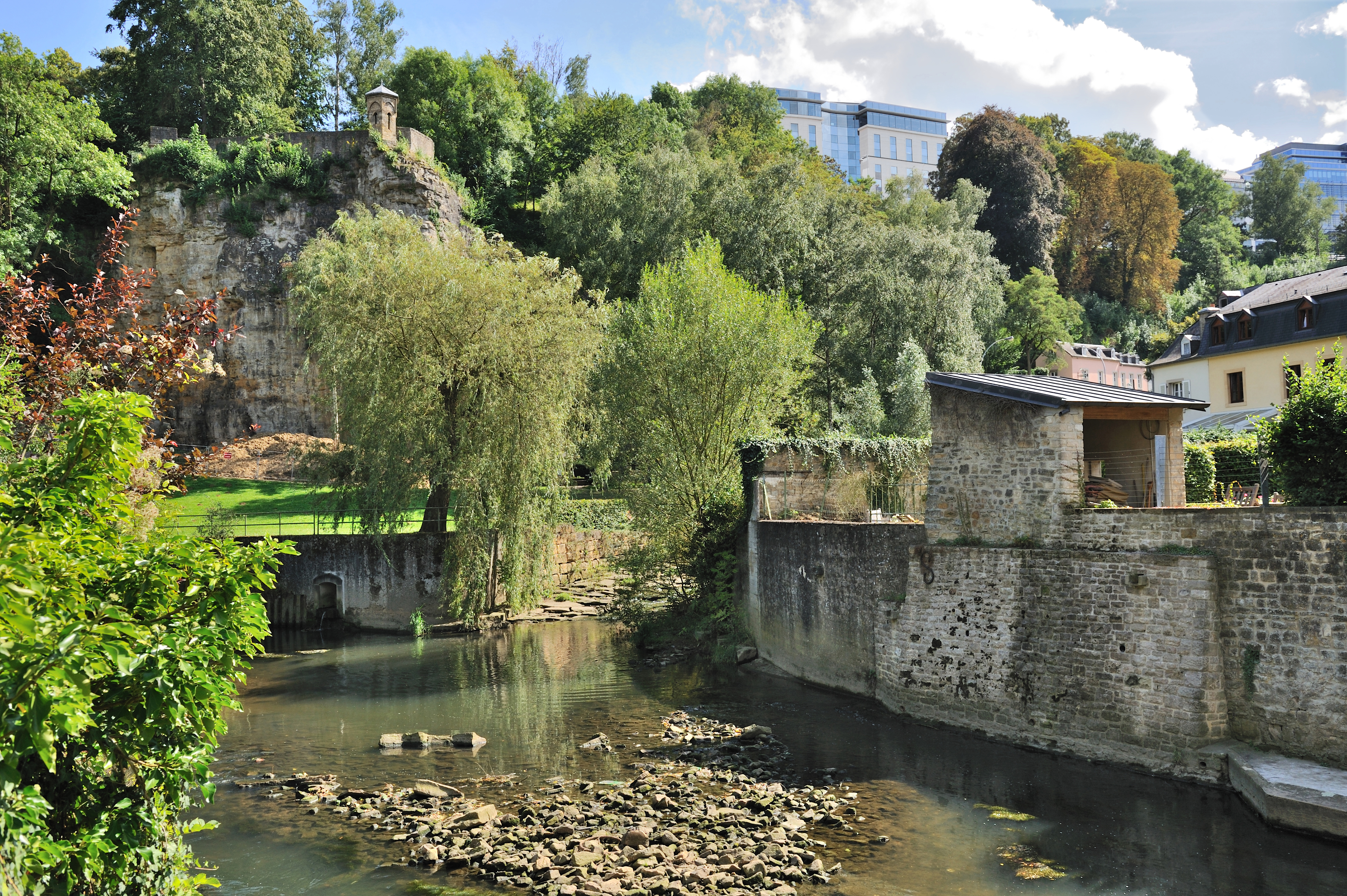
The Alzette and Pétrusse in the Grund

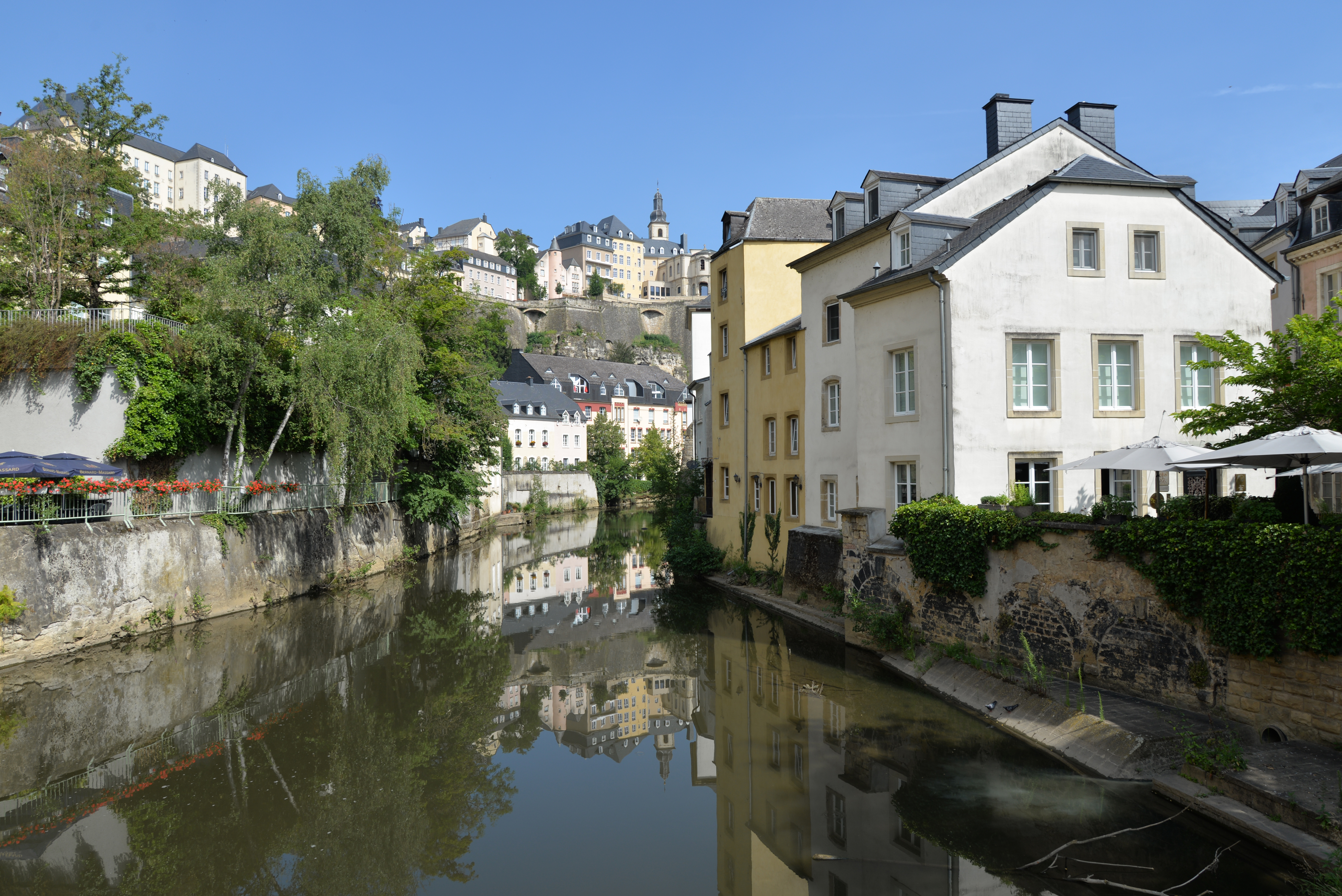
The Alzette in the Grund

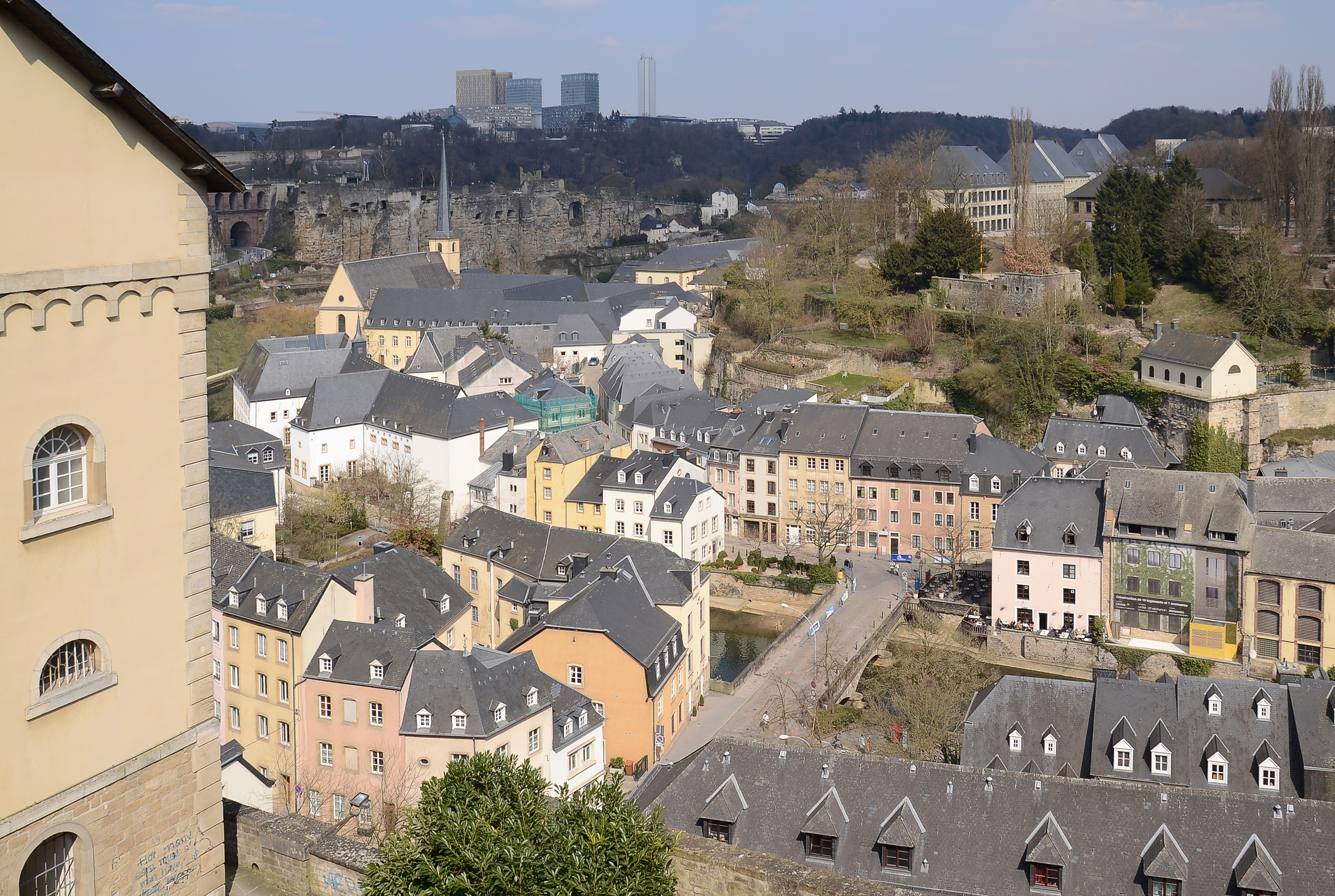
A view of the Grund from above with Kirchberg in the background

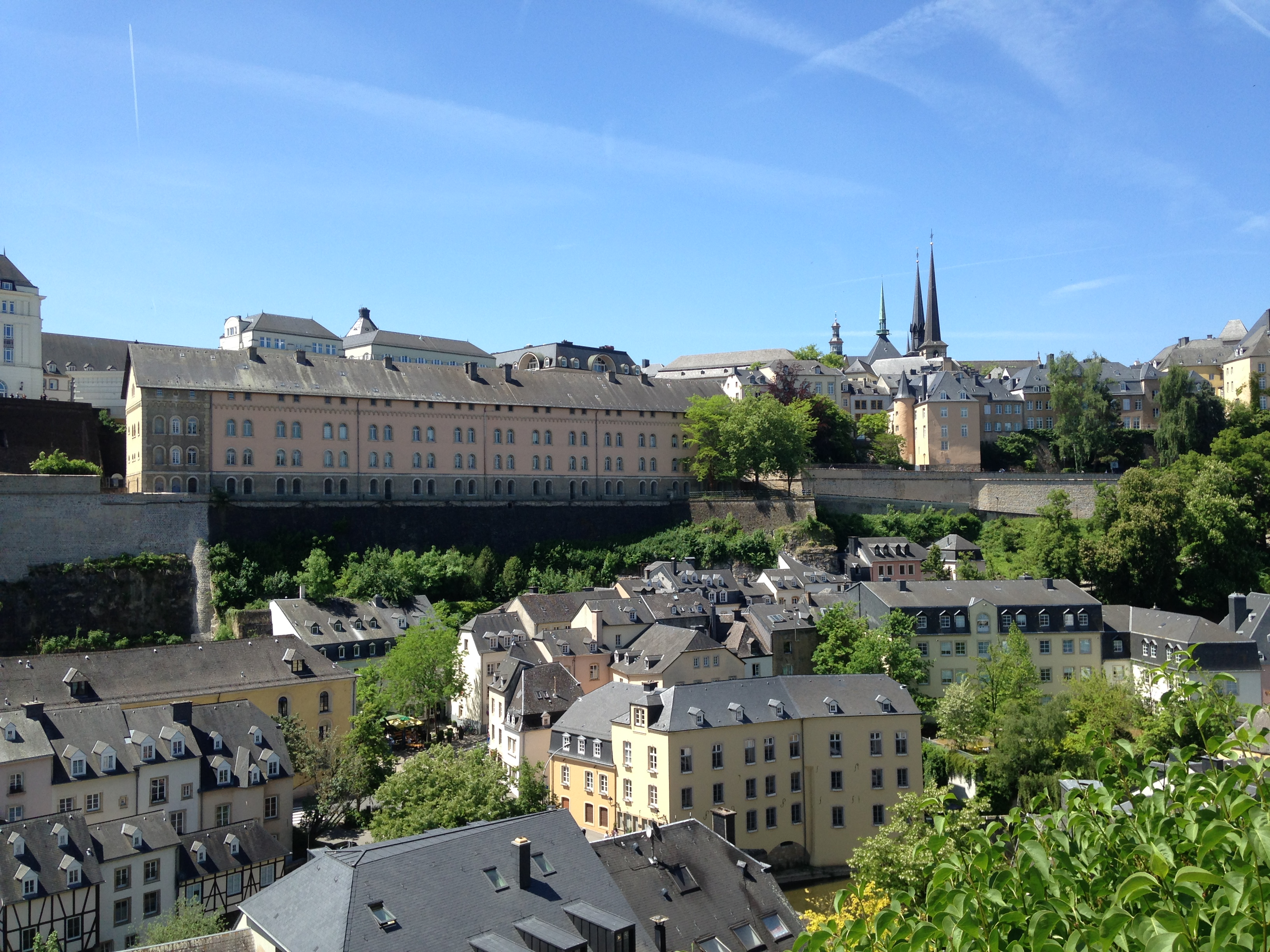
View of the National Archives of Luxembourg (centre left) and the Grund (bottom)
