= Wickrange =

Village in Luxembourg

Coordinates: 49°32′N 6°01′E

Wickrange (French pronunciation: [vikʁɑ̃ʒ]; Luxembourgish: Wickreng; German: Wickringen [ˈvɪkʁɪŋən]) is a village in the commune of Reckange-sur-Mess, in south-western Luxembourg. As of September 2026, the village has a population of 296.
