= Welscheid =

Coordinates: 49°53′N 6°04′E

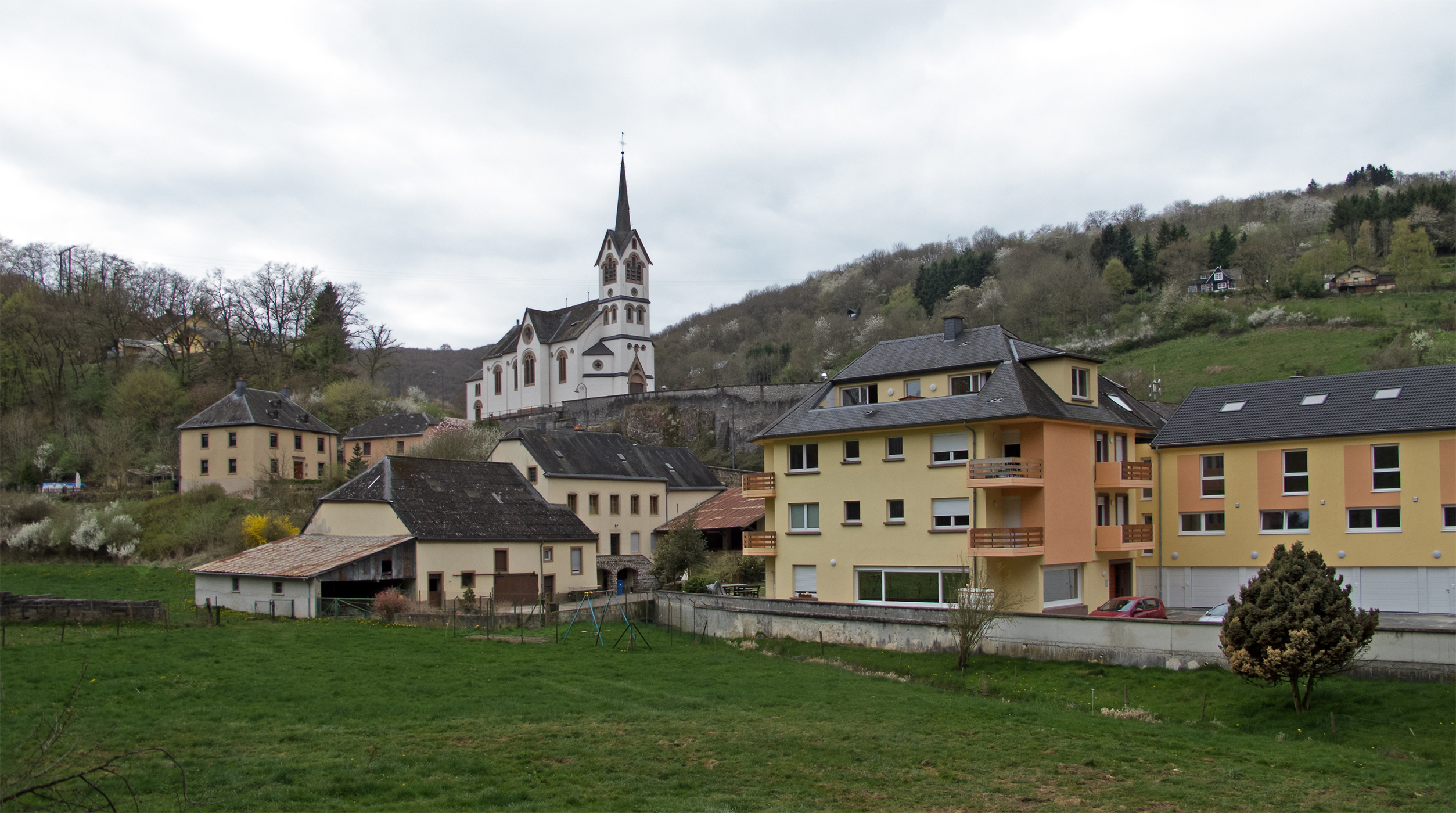
Welscheid in 2014

Welscheid (Luxembourgish: Welschent) is a village in the commune of Bourscheid, in north-eastern Luxembourg. As of September 2026, the village had a population of 230.

Welscheid is connected to the cycling path PC16 with a short serpentine road to Bourscheid.
