= Mess (river) =

Coordinates: 49°30′51″N 6°02′30″E

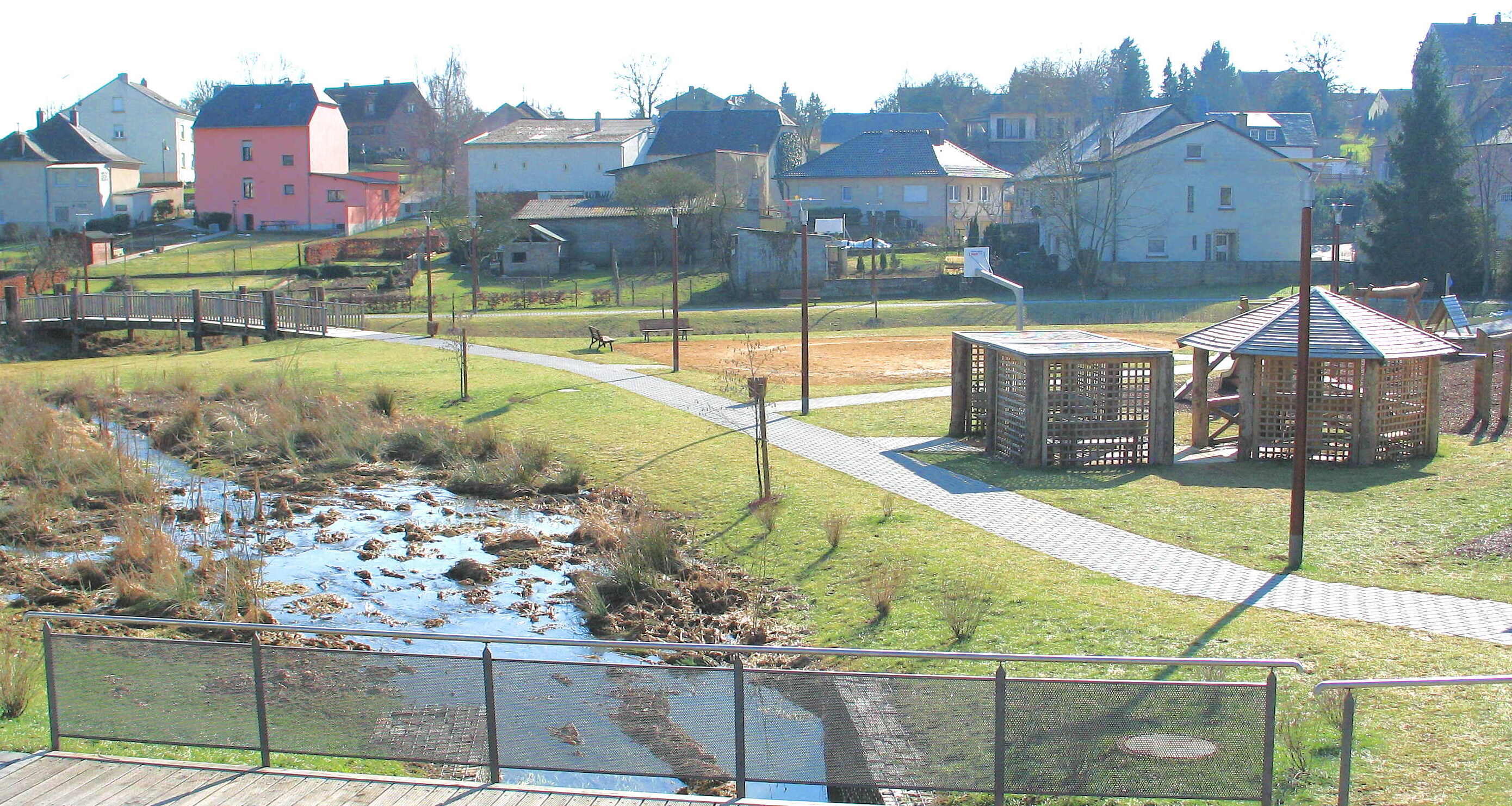

Location
- Country: Luxembourg

Physical characteristics
- Source
  - location: Dippach
- Mouth
  - location: Alzette, at Bergem
- Length: 11 km (6.8 mi)

The Mess (French pronunciation: [mɛs]) is a river flowing through Luxembourg, joining the Alzette at Lameschmillen, near Bergem. It flows through the towns of Reckange-sur-Mess and Pontpierre. Like many rivers, the Mess has been impacted by nonpoint source pollution through surface runoff with dissolved pharmaceuticals and herbicides found in its waters.
