= Roedgen =

Town in Luxembourg

Coordinates: 49°34′N 6°02′E

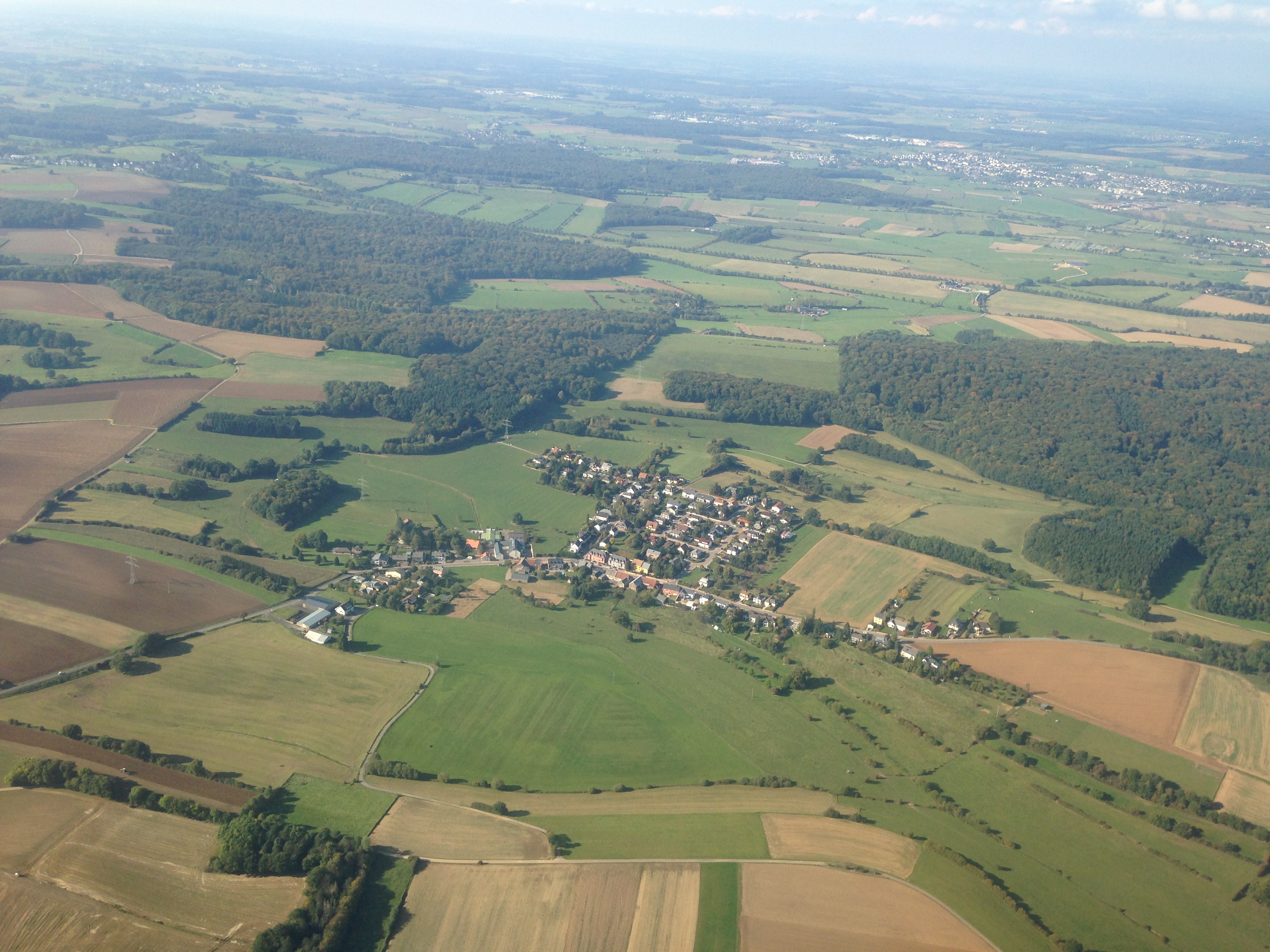
Aerial view of Roedgen (2017)

Roedgen (Luxembourgish: Riedgen) is a small town in the commune of Reckange-sur-Mess, in south-western Luxembourg. As of September 2026, the town has a population of 329.
