= Limpach, Luxembourg =

Coordinates: 49°34′N 5°59′E

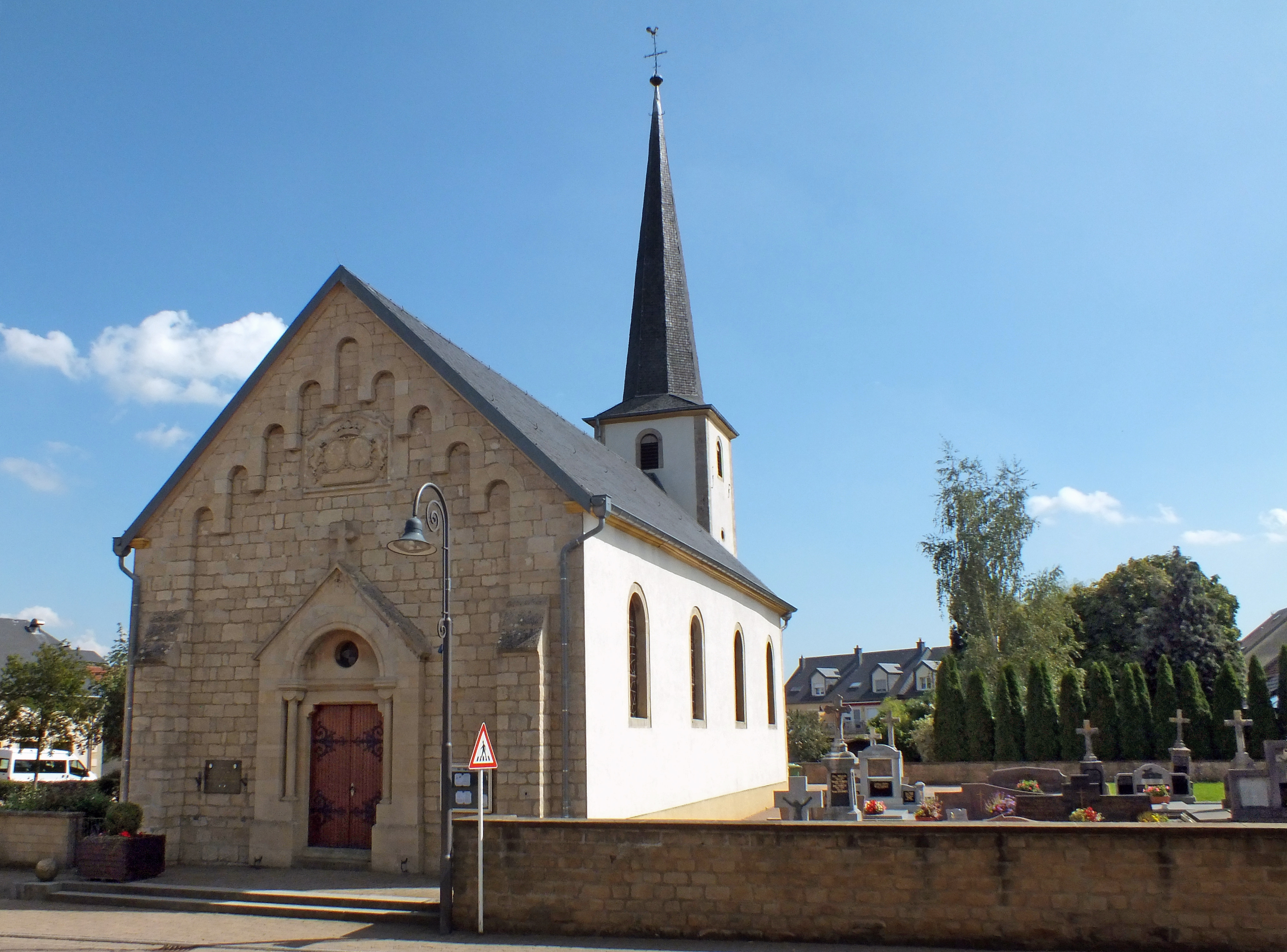
Saint Nicolas Church in Limpach

Limpach (German pronunciation: [ˈlɪmpax]; Luxembourgish: Lampech) is a village in the commune of Reckange-sur-Mess, in south-western Luxembourg. As of September 2026, the village had a population of 470.

== See also ==
- List of villages in Luxembourg
