= Alzette =

River in Luxembourg and France

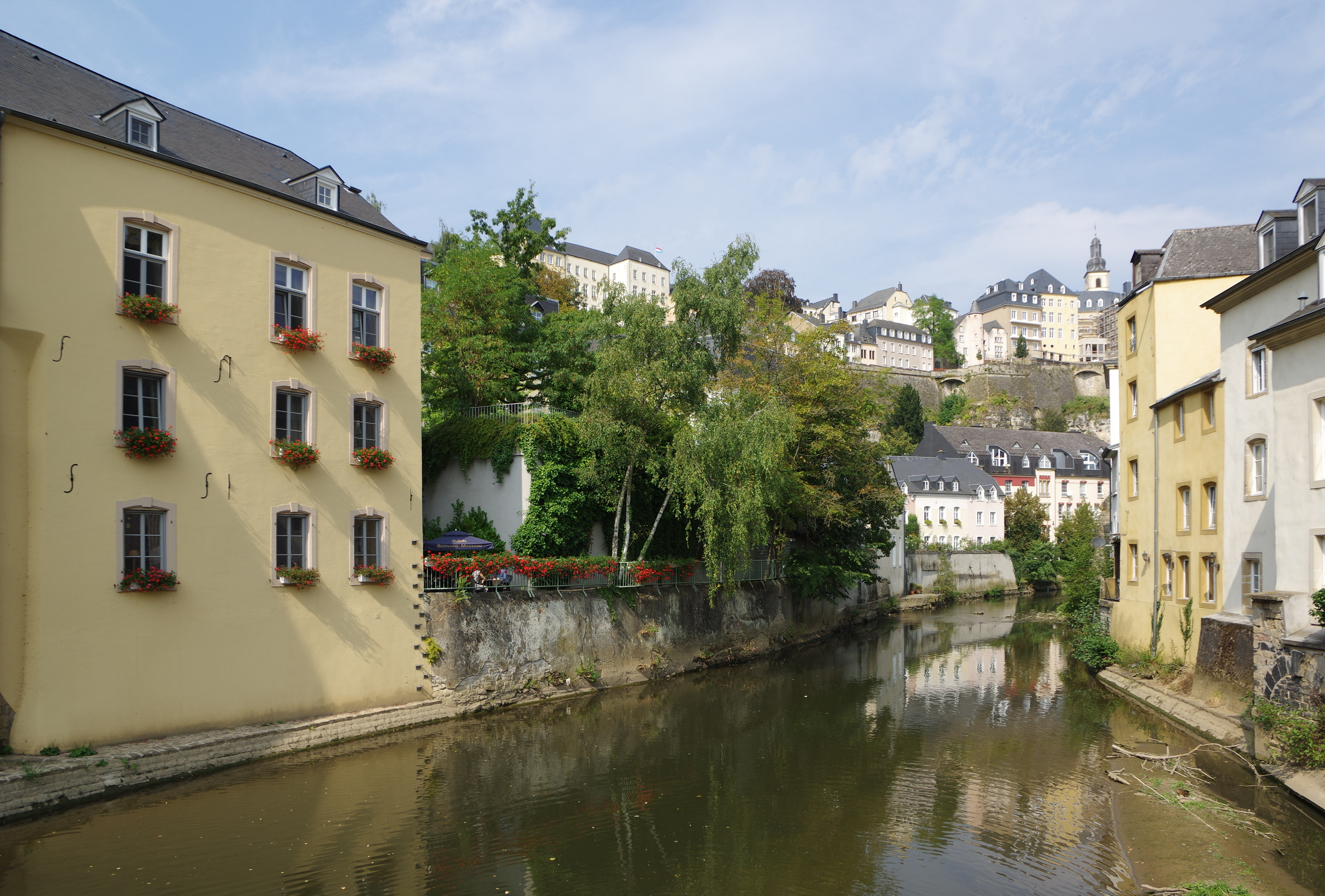
- The Alzette winding through Grund, Luxembourg

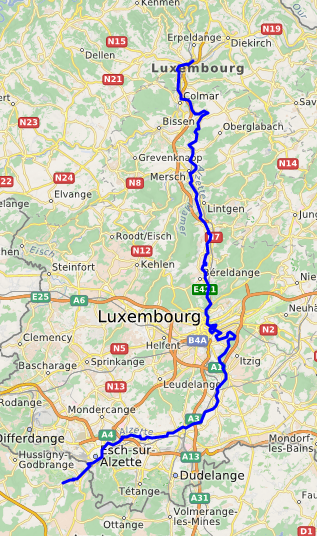
- Course of the Alzette

Location
- Countries: France; Luxembourg

Physical characteristics
- Source
  - location: Thil
  - elevation: 305 m (1,001 ft)
- Mouth: Sauer
  - location: Ettelbruck
  - coordinates: 49°50′54″N 6°6′43″E
- Length: 73 km (45 mi)

Basin features
- Progression: Sauer→ Moselle→ Rhine→ North Sea
- Tributaries
  - left: Mess, Pétrusse, Eisch, Attert, Wark

The Alzette (French pronunciation: [alzɛt]; Luxembourgish: Uelzecht [ˈu̯əltsəɕt]; German: Alzig [ˈaltsɪç]) is a river with a length of 73 kilometres (45 mi) in France and Luxembourg. It is a right tributary of the Sauer (a tributary to the Moselle), and ultimately to the Rhine.

It rises in Thil near the town Villerupt in the Meurthe-et-Moselle département, France. It crosses the border with Luxembourg after 2.7 km (1.7 mi). At Lameschmillen (near Bergem) it is joined by the Mess. It flows through the Luxembourgish towns Esch-sur-Alzette, Luxembourg City and Mersch, and empties into the Sauer near Ettelbruck.

The rocky cliffs above the Alzette in Luxembourg City are called 'Bock'. This name was given to the Casemates du Bock; a honeycomb of tunnels which runs under the ruins of the Fortress of Luxembourg. The fortress protected the city of Luxembourg for centuries until it began to be dismantled in 1867.
