= Bergem =

Coordinates: 49°31′N 6°03′E

Bergem (Luxembourgish: Biergem, pronounced [ˈbi̯əʑəm]) is a town in the commune of Mondercange, in south-western Luxembourg. As of September 2026, the town has a population of 1,573 inhabitants.

In close proximity to the town is the confluence of the Alzette and Mess rivers, upon which the Lameschmillen water mill was constructed in twelfth century.
