= Altwies =

Town in the commune of Mondorf-les-Bains in Luxembourg

Coordinates: 49°31′N 6°15′E

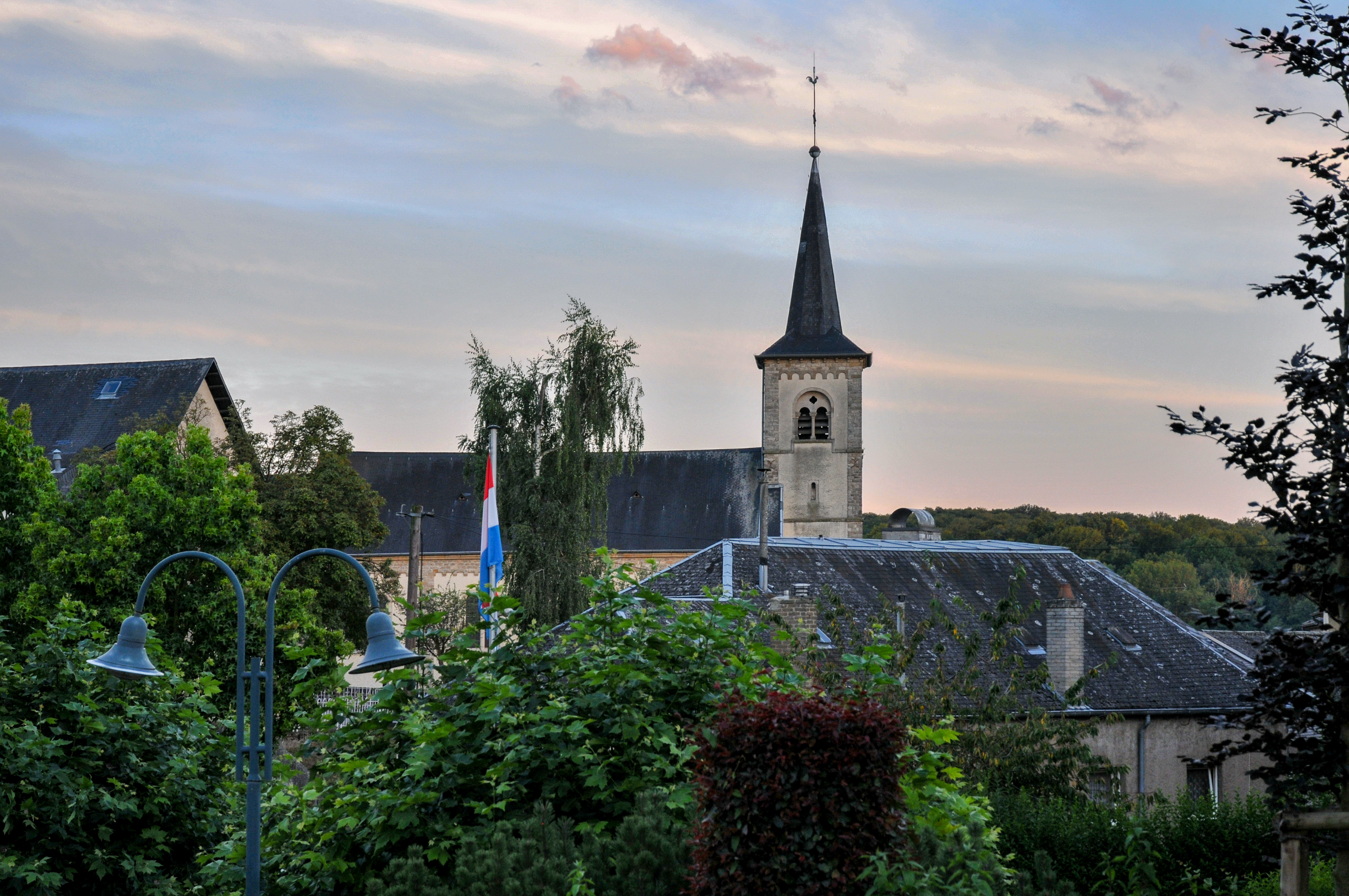
View of Altwies (2018).

Altwies (German pronunciation: [ˈaltviːs]; Luxembourgish: Altwis) is a small town in the commune of Mondorf-les-Bains, in south-eastern Luxembourg. As of September 2026, the town has a population of 833.
