= European route E29 =

Road in Europe

E29

Route information
- Length: 323 km (201 mi)

Major junctions
- North end: Cologne, Germany
- South end: Sarreguemines, France

Location
- Countries: Germany; Luxembourg; France

Highway system
- International E-road network; A Class; B Class

European route E29 is a series of roads in Europe, part of the United Nations International E-road network.

It runs from Cologne, Germany through Luxembourg, through Germany again, and finishing at Sarreguemines, France.

Firstly it leaves Cologne, where it links with the E31, the E35, the E37 and the E40. It then heads south and crosses into Luxembourg, and into Luxembourg City, where more links are made to the E25, the E44 and the E421.

It then re-enters Germany, more specifically the Saarland, running through the city of Saarbrücken, where it links with the E50 and the E422.

On its final stretch, it crosses the French border and finishes at Sarreguemines.

Its total length is 323 km (201 mi).
