= Parc de Merl =

Urban park in Luxembourg City

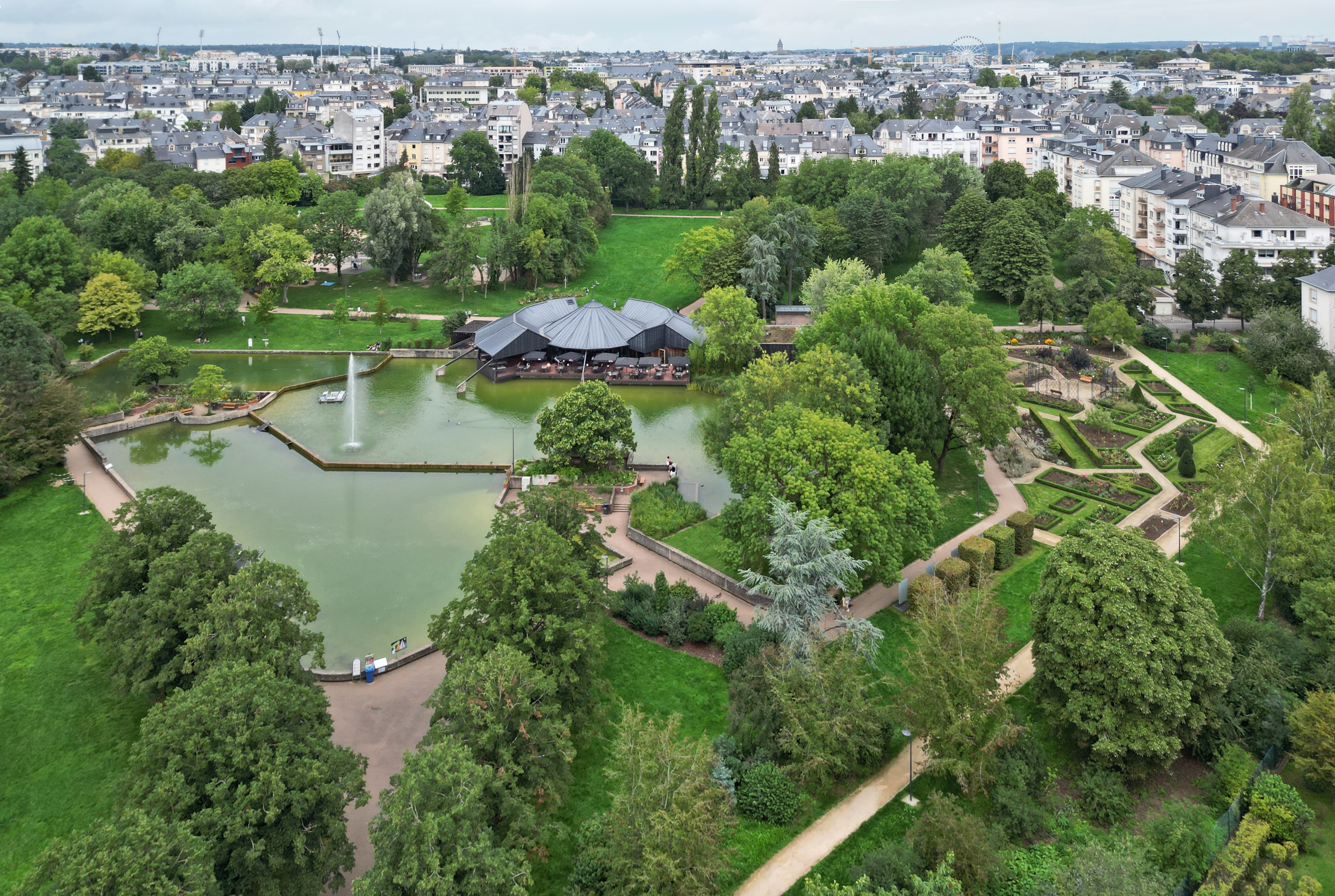
- Interactive map of Parc de Merl
- Type: Public park
- Location: Hollerich, Luxembourg City, Luxembourg
- Coordinates: 49°36′23″N 06°06′44″E
- Area: 6 ha (15 acres)
- Operator: Luxembourg City council

Parc de Merl (Luxembourgish: Märeler Park) is an urban park in Luxembourg City, in southern Luxembourg.

Despite its name, the park is not located in the district of Merl, but in Hollerich. It is bordered by Avenue du X Septembre (N5) to the north-west, Boulevard Pierre Dupong to the south-west, Rue de Bragance to the south-east, and Avenue Guillaume to the north-east.
