= Luxembourg City =

Capital of Luxembourg

Luxembourg City: Stad Lëtzebuerg (Luxembourgish); Ville de Luxembourg (French); Luxemburg-Stadt (German)
- Capital city and commune
- Stad Lëtzebuerg
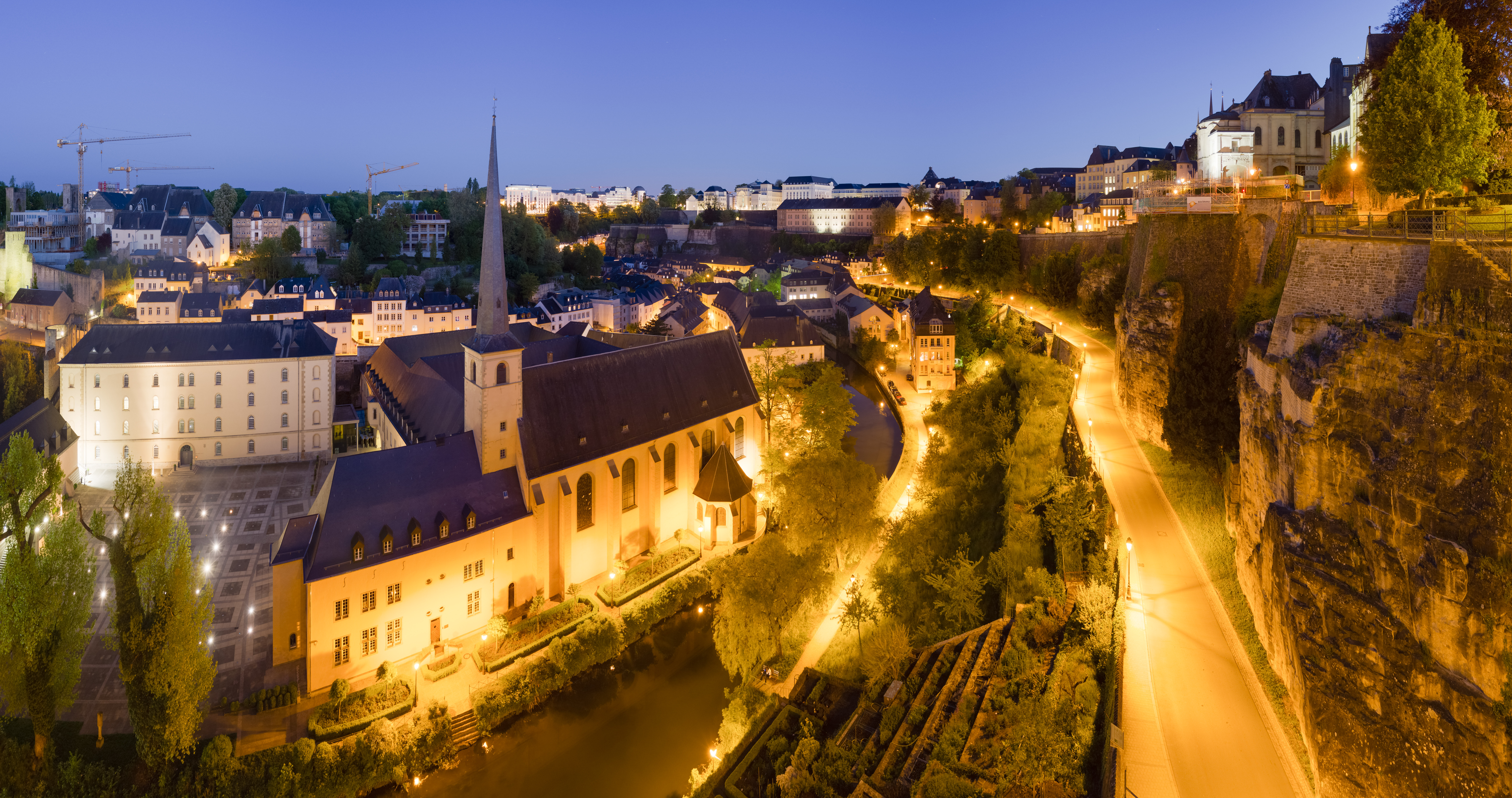
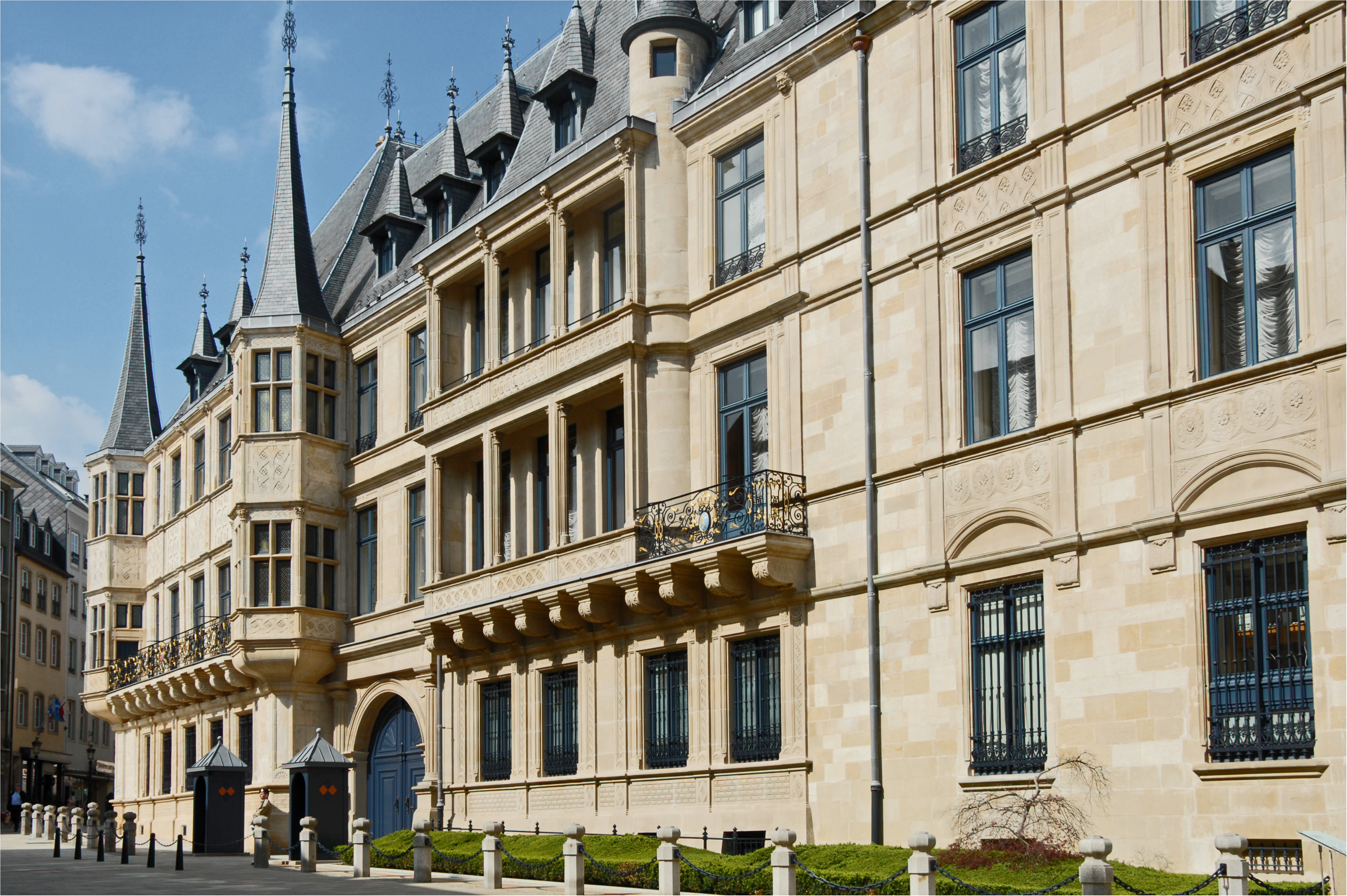
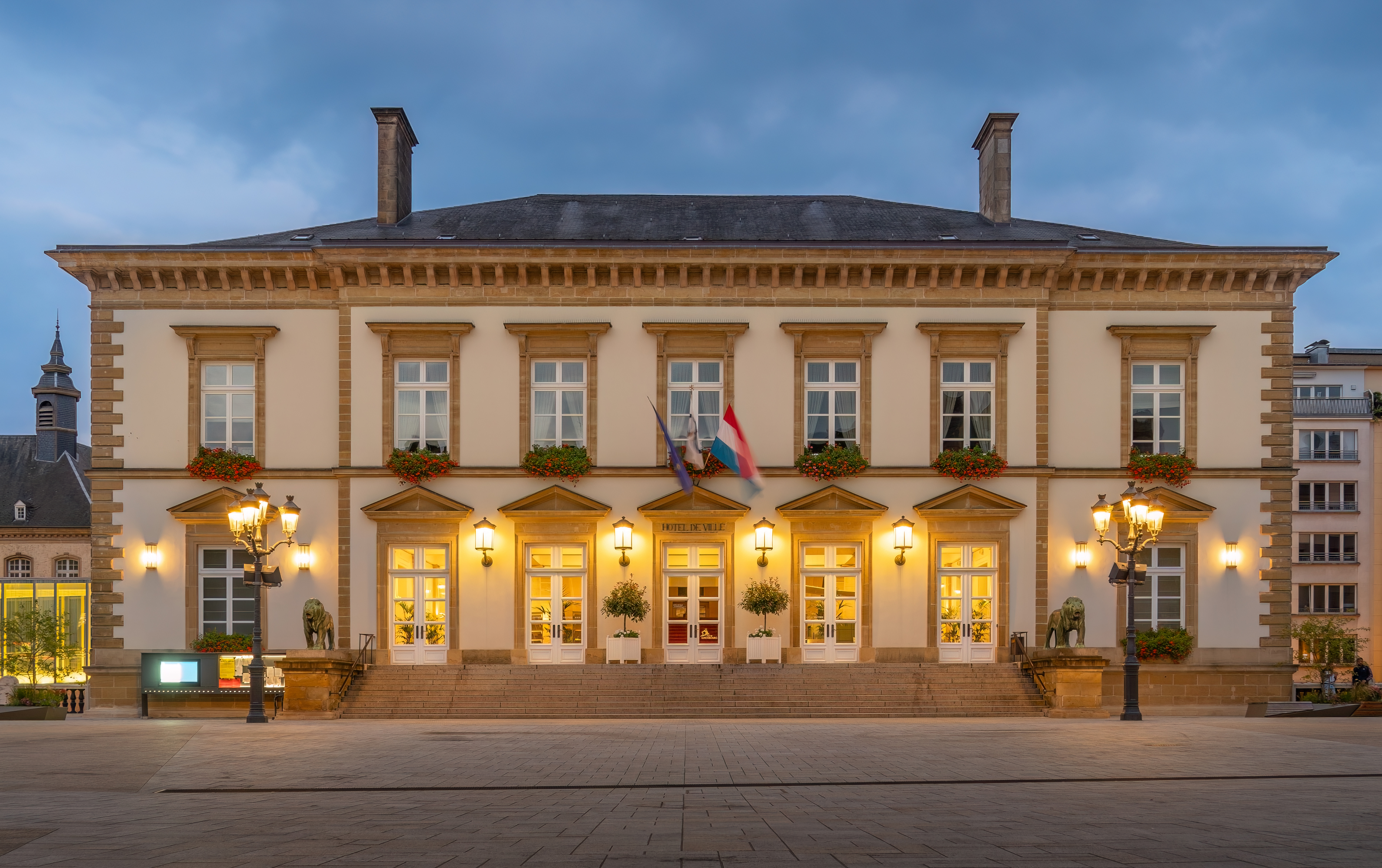
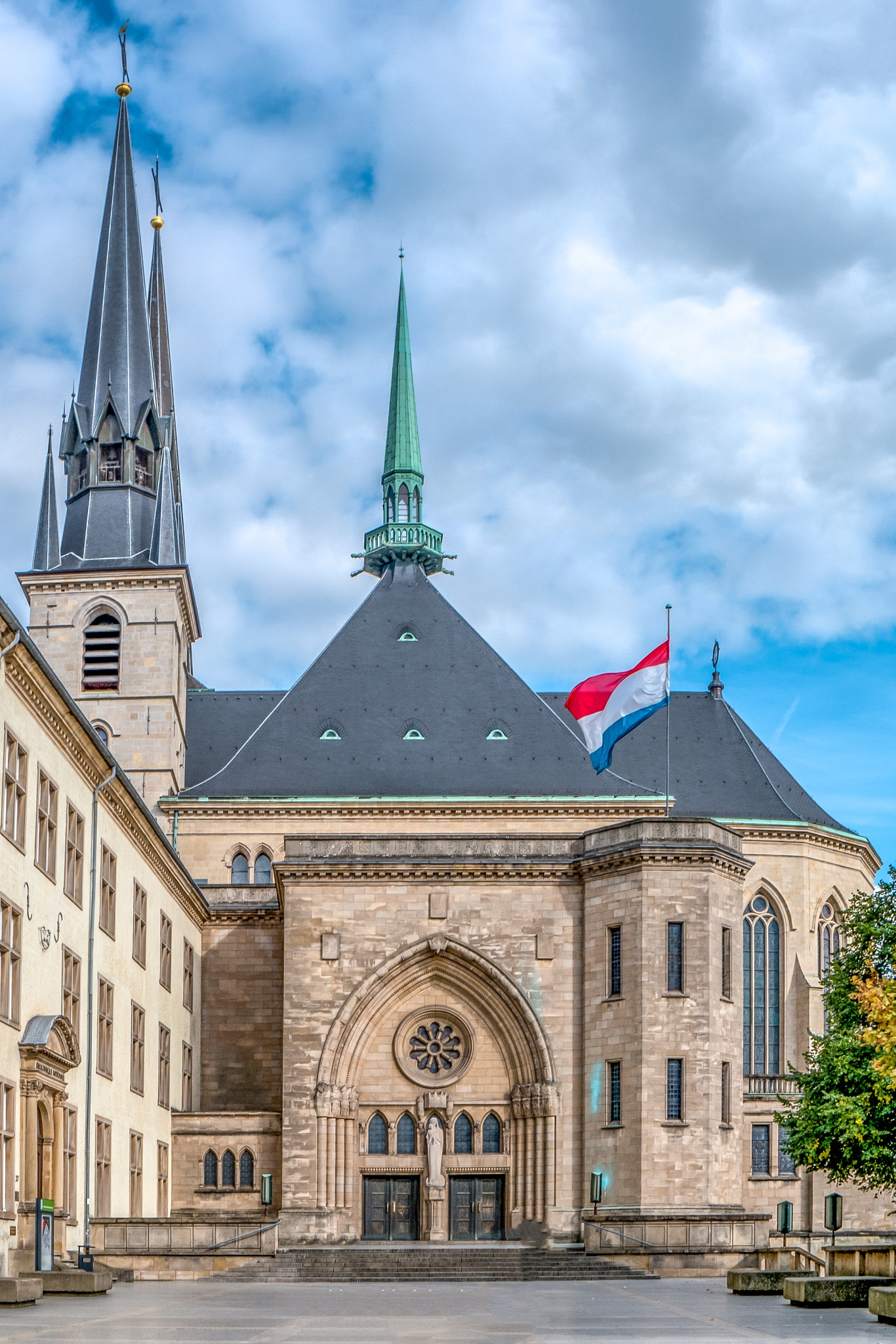
- Neumünster Abbey and remains of the fortress Grand Ducal Palace Luxembourg City Hall Notre-Dame Cathedral Alzette River in Grund Gëlle Fra Kirchberg

- Flag Coat of arms Logo
- Interactive map of Luxembourg City
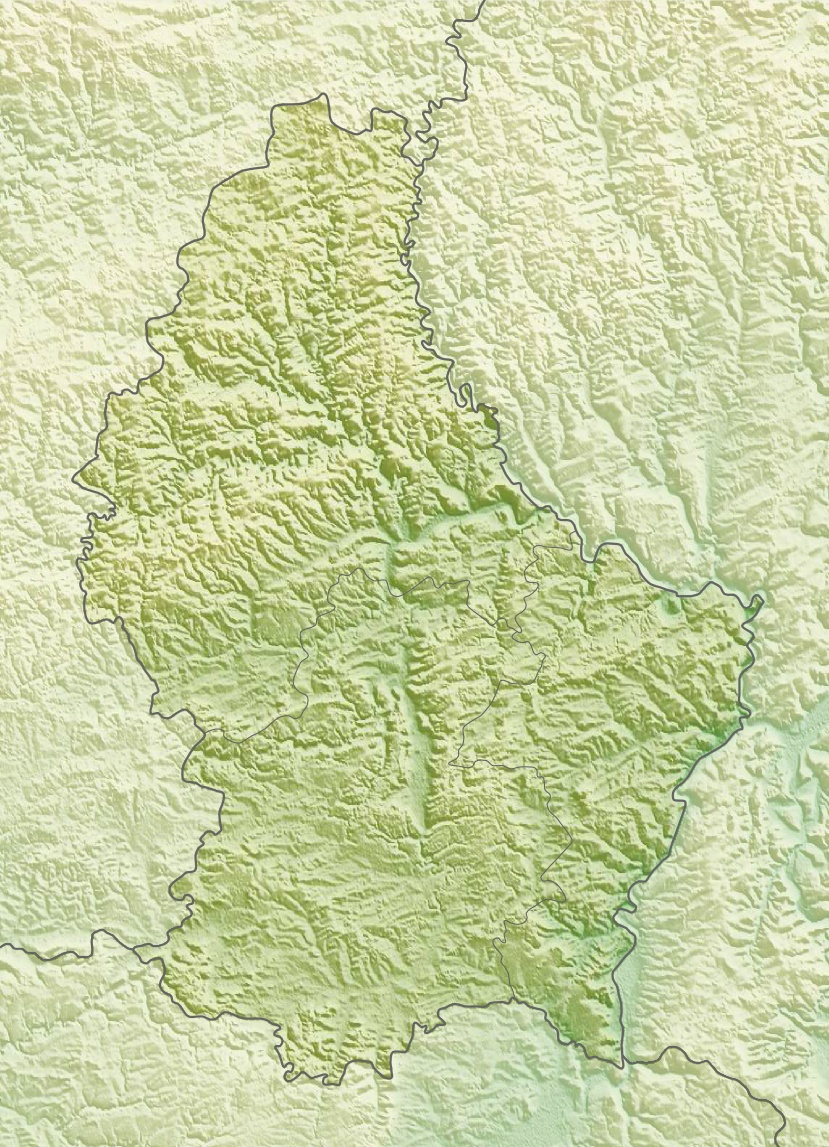
- Location within Luxembourg Location within Europe
- Coordinates: 49°36′41″N 6°7′48″E
- Country: Luxembourg
- Canton: Luxembourg

Government
  - Mayor: Lydie Polfer (DP)

Area
  - Total: 51.46 km^{2} (19.87 sq mi)
  - Rank: 7th of 100
- Highest elevation: 402 m (1,319 ft)
  - Rank: 48th of 100
- Lowest elevation: 230 m (750 ft)
  - Rank: 42nd of 100

Population (2026)
  - Total: 137,678
  - Rank: 1st of 100
  - Density: 2,675/km^{2} (6,929/sq mi)
  - Rank: 1st of 100
- Time zone: UTC+01:00 (CET)
  - Summer (DST): UTC+02:00 (CEST)
- LAU 2: LU0000304
- Climate: Temperate oceanic climate (Cfb)
- Website: www.vdl.lu

Luxembourg, (Note: /ˈlʌksəmˌbɜːrɡ/; Luxembourgish: Lëtzebuerg [ˈlətsəbu̯əɕ]; French: Luxembourg [lyksɑ̃buʁ]; German: Luxemburg [ˈlʊksm̩bʊʁk]) also known as Luxembourg City, (Note: Luxembourgish: Stad Lëtzebuerg [ʃtaːt ˈlətsəbu̯əɕ] or d'Stad [tʃtaːt]; French: Ville de Luxembourg [vil də lyksɑ̃buʁ]; German: Stadt Luxemburg [ʃtat ˈlʊksm̩bʊʁk]) is the capital city of the Grand Duchy of Luxembourg and the country's most populous commune. Standing at the confluence of the Alzette and Pétrusse rivers in southern Luxembourg, the city lies in the centre of Western Europe, situated 213 km (132 mi) by road from Brussels and 209 km (130 mi) from Cologne.

As of 9 October 2026, Luxembourg City has a population of 139,000 inhabitants, which is more than three times the population of the country's second most populous commune, Esch-sur-Alzette. The population consists of 160 nationalities. Foreigners represent 69.5% of the city's population, whilst Luxembourgers represent 30.5% of the population, making it the commune with the highest proportion of foreign residents in Luxembourg.

In 2024, Luxembourg was ranked by the IMF as having the highest GDP per capita in the world at $140,310 (PPP), with the city having developed into a banking and administrative centre. In the 2019 Mercer worldwide survey of 231 cities, Luxembourg was placed first for personal safety, while it was ranked 18th for quality of living.

Luxembourg is one of the de facto capitals of the European Union (alongside Brussels, Frankfurt and Strasbourg), as it is the seat of several institutions, agencies and bodies, including the Court of Justice of the European Union, the European Court of Auditors, the Secretariat of the European Parliament, the European Public Prosecutor's Office, the European Investment Bank, the European Investment Fund, the European Stability Mechanism, Eurostat, as well as other European Commission departments and services. The Council of the European Union meets in the city for three months annually.

== History ==
=== Development as a fortress ===
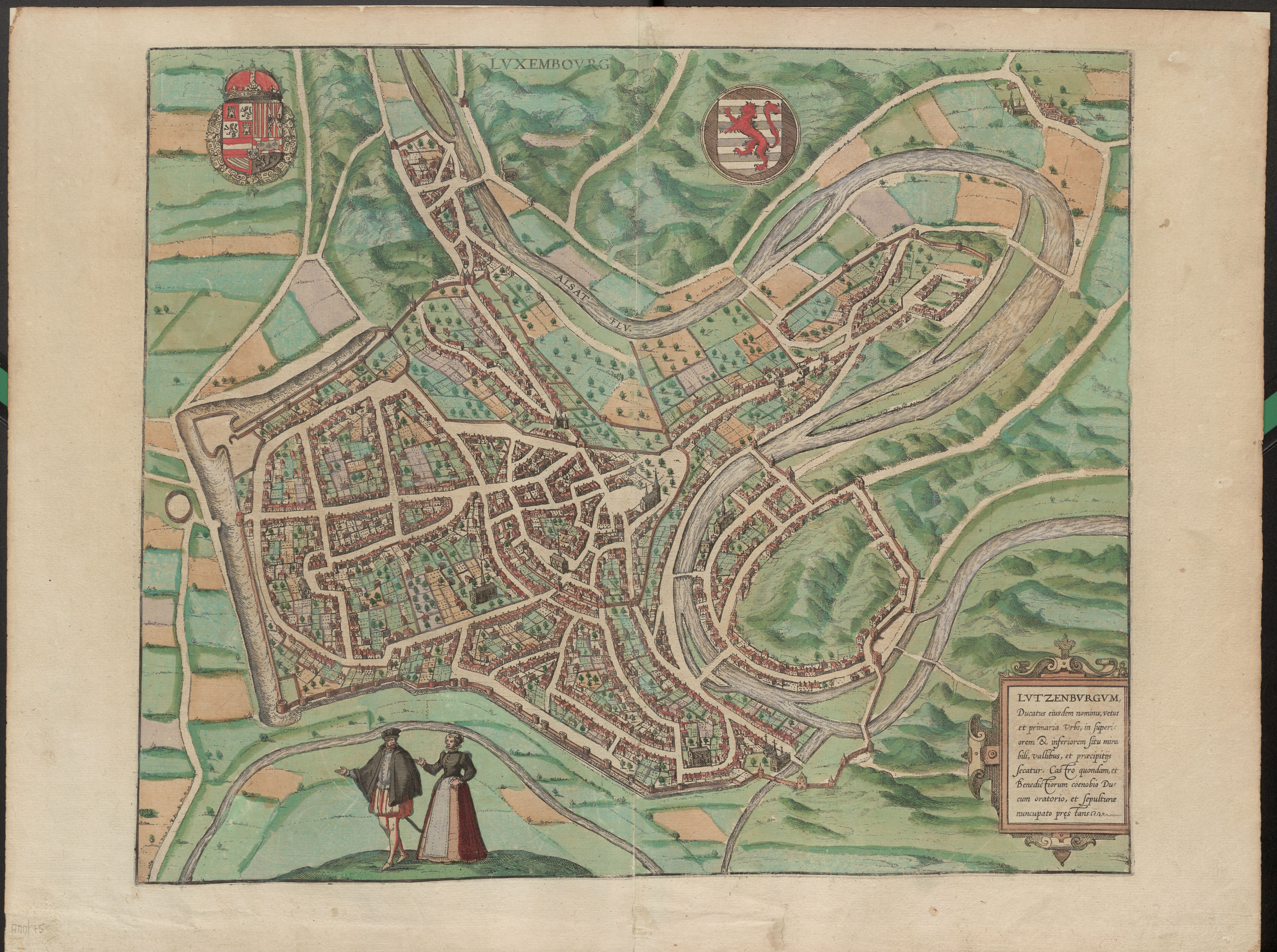
Map of the City around 1600

In the Roman era, a fortified tower may have been constructed to guard the crossing of two Roman roads that met on the territory of what is now Luxembourg City, although historian Jemp Kunnert claims no structure is believed to have existed at said crossing. Some of the earliest known settlements within modern city boundaries were established by Frankish colonisers in the Alzette valley around what is now Dommeldange, Pfaffenthal and the Grund. As of 926, 73 inhabitants were living in the valley between Dommeldange and Clausen.

In 963, through an exchange treaty with the abbey of Saint Maximin in Trier, Siegfried I of the Ardennes - a close relative of King Louis II of France and Emperor Otto the Great - acquired the castellum Lucilinburhuc ("small castle"), a military structure built around the 9th or early 10th century on what is now the Fish Market. This structure would serve as an outpost to the fortified castle - which retained the name of Lucilinburhuc - which Siegfried then began constructing on the Bock Fiels ("rock"), mentioned for the first time in the aforementioned exchange treaty.

In 987, Archbishop Egbert of Trier consecrated five altars in the Church of the Redemption (today St Michael's Church). At a Roman road intersection near the church, the Fish Market appeared, around which the city developed.

The city, because of its location and natural geography, has through history been a place of strategic military significance. The first fortifications were built as early as the 10th century. By the mid-13th century and the reign of Countess Ermesinde, who granted the city its charter in 1244, Luxembourg had expanded westward around the new St Nicholas Church (today the Cathedral of Notre Dame), with new walls built that included an area of 5 hectares (12 acres). In about 1340, under the reign of John of Bohemia, new fortifications were built that stood until 1867.

In 1443, the Burgundians under Philip the Good conquered Luxembourg. Luxembourg became part of the Burgundian, and later Spanish and Austrian empires (See Spanish Netherlands and Spanish Road) and under those Habsburg administrations Luxembourg Castle was repeatedly strengthened so that by the 16th century, Luxembourg itself was one of the strongest fortifications in Europe. Subsequently, the Burgundians, the Spanish, the French, the Spanish again, the Austrians, the French again and the Prussians conquered Luxembourg.

On 11 June 1554, during a storm over the city, lightning struck the church of the Franscican convent, on the current site of the Place Guillaume II, the attic of which was serving as a gunpowder magazine. The ensuing explosion sent flaming pieces of the church roof flying into a wide radius, setting fire to the mostly thatched or shingled rooves of buildings. A large part of the Ville Haute was destroyed, causing an unknown number of casualties. Dutch military engineer Sebastiaan van Noyen was tasked with drawing a reconstruction plan, but most of his proposals failed to be implemented in following years, being disregarded by citizens when rebuilding their homes. His vision of a large new central square, the forum novum, was only realised in 1671, with the creation of the Place d'Armes.

In the 17th century, the first casemates were built; initially, Spain built 23 km (14 mi) of tunnels, starting in 1644. These were then enlarged under French rule by Marshal Vauban, and augmented again under Austrian rule in the 1730s and 1740s.

During the French Revolutionary Wars, the city was occupied by France twice: once briefly in 1792–93, and later after a seven-month siege. Luxembourg held out for so long under the French siege that French politician and military engineer Lazare Carnot called Luxembourg "the best fortress in the world, except Gibraltar", giving rise to the city's nickname: the "Gibraltar of the North".

Nevertheless, the Austrian garrison eventually surrendered, and, as a consequence, Luxembourg was annexed by the French Republic, becoming part of the department of Forêts, with Luxembourg City as its prefecture. Under the 1815 Treaty of Paris, which ended the Napoleonic Wars, Luxembourg City was placed under Prussian military control as a part of the German Confederation, although sovereignty passed to the House of Orange-Nassau, in personal union with the United Kingdom of the Netherlands.

=== Transition to a modern city ===
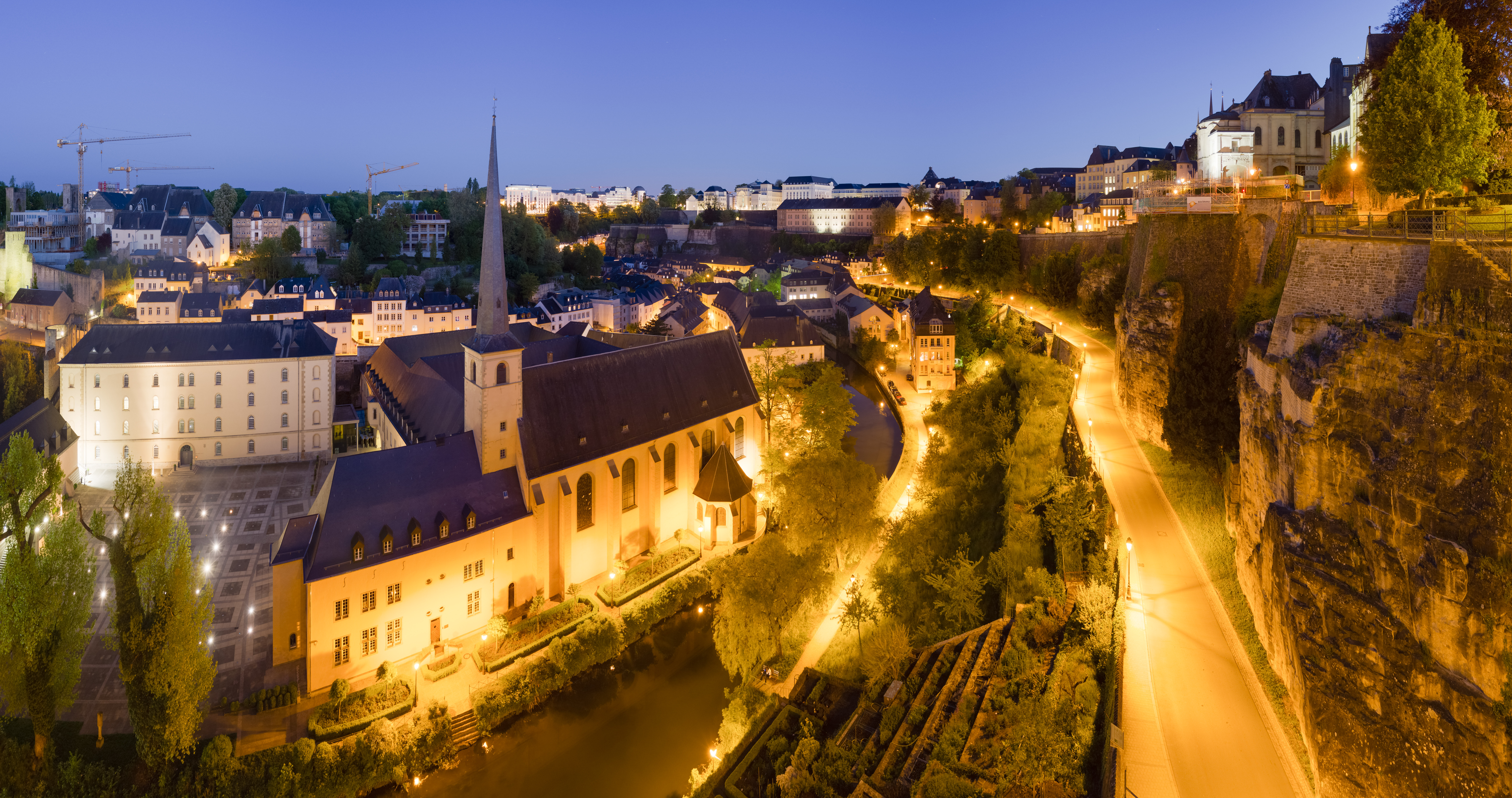
The Old City of Luxembourg at night

After the Luxembourg Crisis, the 1867 Treaty of London required Luxembourg to dismantle the fortifications in Luxembourg City. By that time, the city had an area of 127 hectares (310 acres), while the surrounding defensive works took up 177 hectares (440 acres), around which a building restriction perimeter of nearly 1 kilometre (0.62 mi), first established by the Austrians in 1749 for security reasons, had made further urbanisation impossible. Their demolition, which would signify the opening of the city, took sixteen years, cost 1.5 million gold francs and required the destruction of over 24 km (15 mi) of underground defences and 4 hectares (9.9 acres) of casemates, batteries, barracks, etc. Furthermore, the Prussian garrison was to be withdrawn.

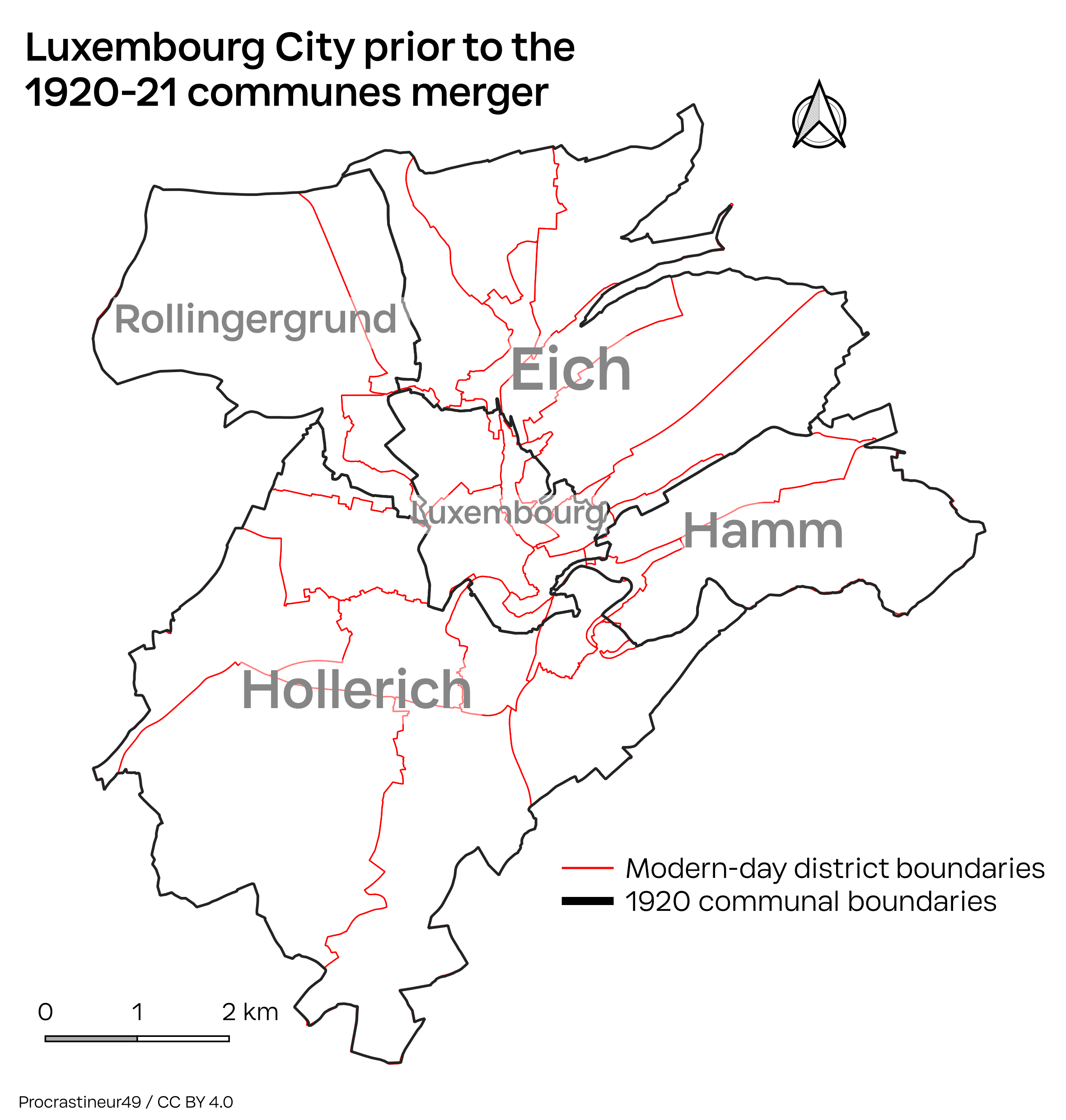
Until 1920, the boundaries of the city proper (in the centre of the map) were considerably smaller.

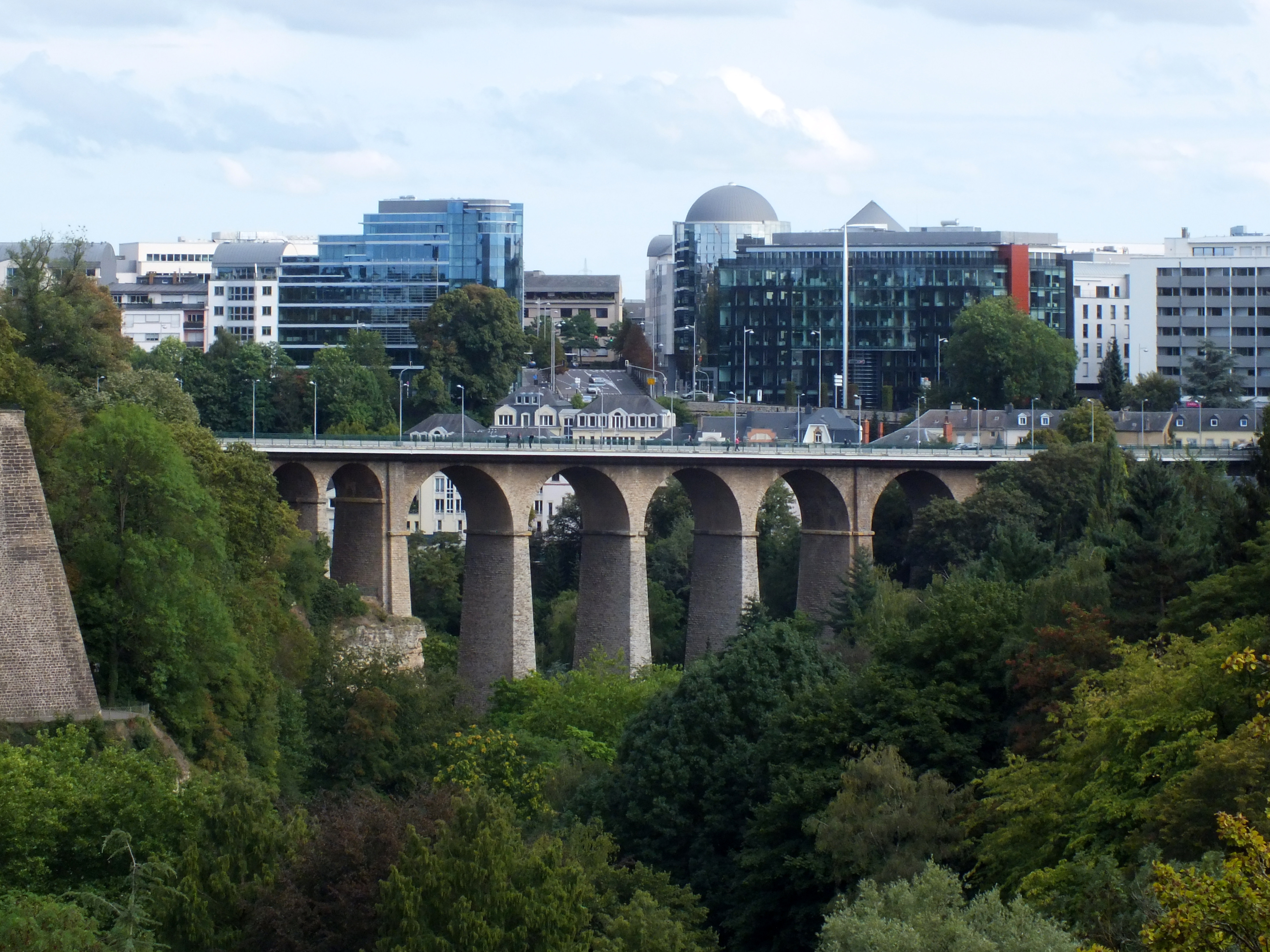
The Passerelle over the Pétrusse valley, also known as the viaduct or old bridge, opened in 1861.

When in 1890 Grand Duke William III died without any male heirs, the Grand Duchy passed out of Dutch hands into an independent line under Grand Duke Adolphe. Thus, Luxembourg, which had hitherto been independent in theory only, became a truly independent country, with Luxembourg City regaining some of the importance that it had lost in 1867 by becoming the capital of a fully independent state.

Despite Luxembourg's best efforts to remain neutral in the First World War, it was occupied by Germany on 2 August 1914. On 30 August, Helmuth von Moltke moved his headquarters to Luxembourg City, closer to his armies in France in preparation for a swift victory. However, the victory never came, so Luxembourg had to play host to the German high command for another four years. At the end of the occupation, Luxembourg City was the scene of an attempted communist revolution; on 9 November 1918, communists declared a socialist republic, but it lasted only a few hours.

In 1920 and 1921, the city limits were greatly expanded, with the communes of Eich, Hamm, Hollerich and Rollingergrund all merging with Luxembourg City. Until then, the city proper had an area of only 3.55 km^{2} (1.37 sq mi); the merger gave Luxembourg City a new area of 51.52 km^{2} (19.89 sq mi), making the city the largest commune in the country (a position that it would hold until 1978).

In 1940, Germany occupied Luxembourg again. The Nazis were not prepared to allow Luxembourgers self-government and gradually integrated Luxembourg into the Third Reich by informally attaching the country administratively to a neighbouring German province. Under the occupation, the capital city's streets all received new, German names, which was announced on 4 October 1940. The Avenue de la Liberté for example, a major road leading to the railway station, was renamed "Adolf-Hitlerstraße". On 26 March 1943, Nazi authorities expanded the city's boundaries by incorporating the communes of Strassen and Walferdange and parts of the commune of Hesperange. Luxembourg City was liberated on 10 September 1944, after which the pre-occupation city boundaries were restored. The city was under long-range bombardment by the German V-3 cannon in December 1944 and January 1945.

After the war Luxembourg ended its neutrality and became a founding member of several inter-governmental and supra-governmental institutions. In 1952, the city became the headquarters of the High Authority of the European Coal and Steel Community. In 1967, the High Authority was merged with the commissions of the other European institutions; although Luxembourg City was no longer the seat of the ECSC, it hosted some part-sessions of the European Parliament until 1981. Luxembourg remains the seat of the European Parliament's secretariat, as well as the Court of Justice of the European Union, the European Court of Auditors and the European Investment Bank. Several departments of the European Commission are also based in Luxembourg. The Council of the European Union meets in the city for the months of April, June and October annually.

== Geography ==
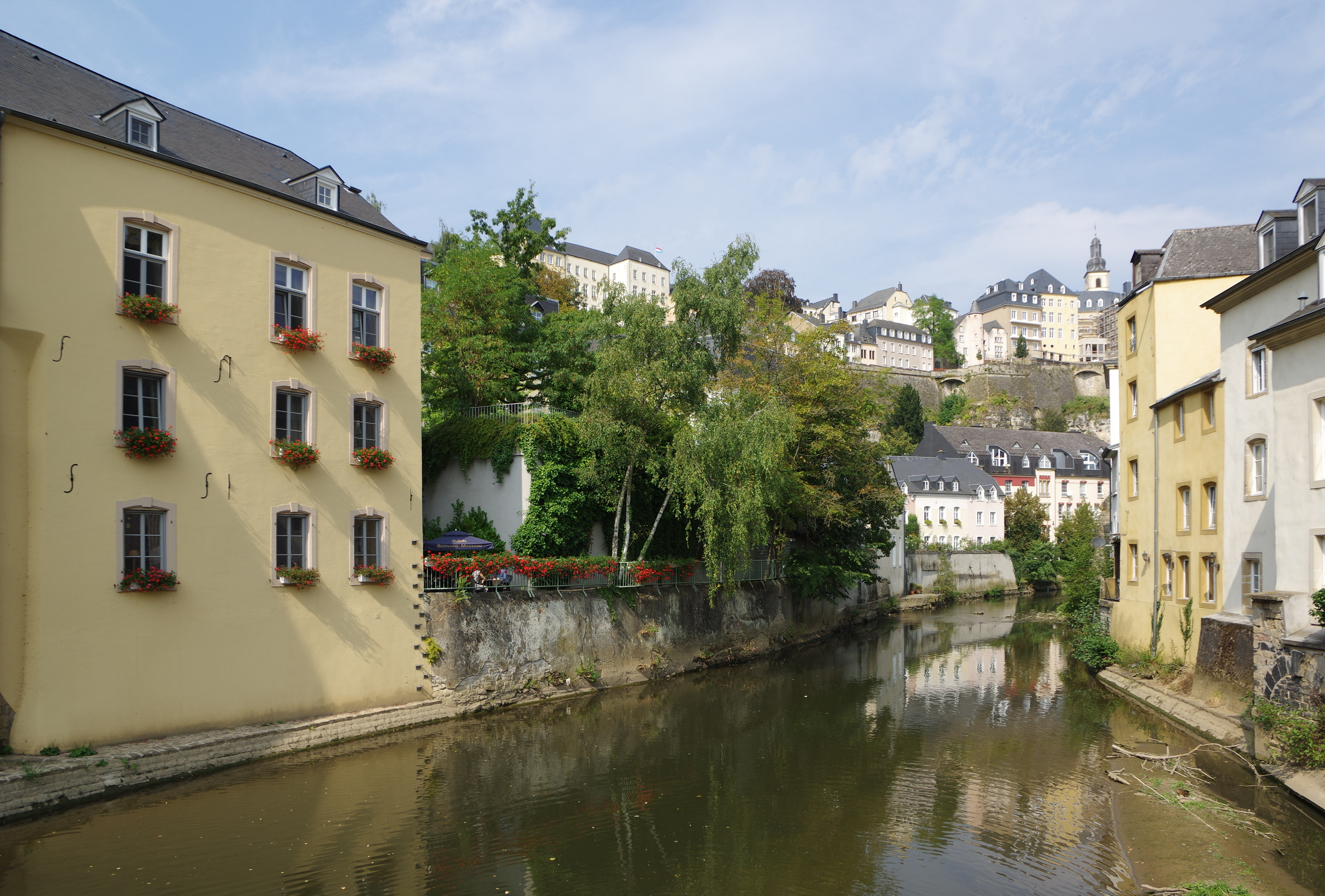
View from the Grund up to the Old Town

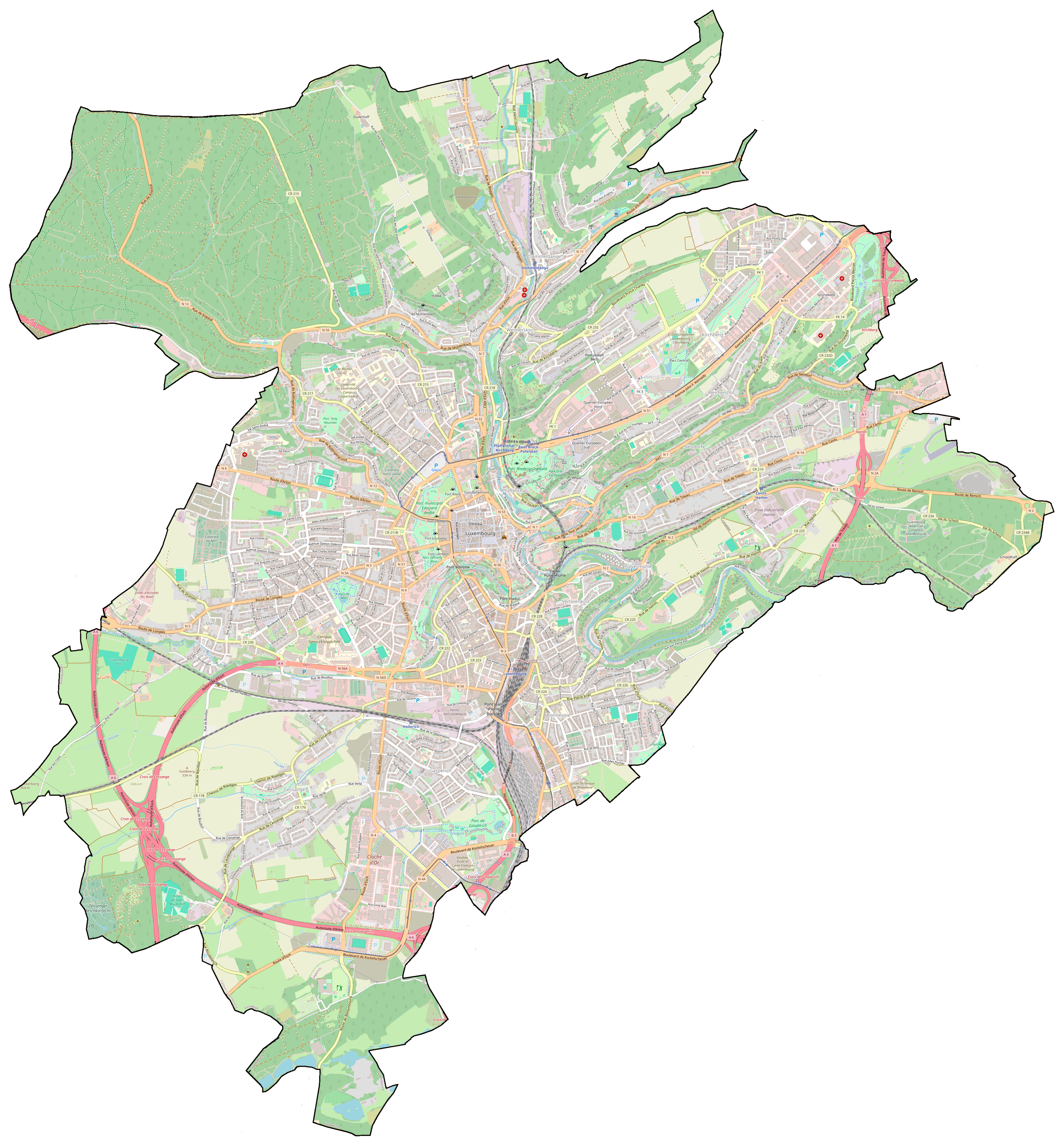
Detailed map of Luxembourg City

=== Topography ===
Luxembourg City lies on the southern part of the Luxembourg Plateau, a large Early Jurassic sandstone formation that forms the heart of the Guttland, a low-lying and flat area that covers the southern two-thirds of the country.

The city centre occupies a picturesque site on a salient, perched high on precipitous cliffs that drop into the narrow valleys of the Alzette and Pétrusse rivers, whose confluence is in Luxembourg City. The 70 m (230 ft) deep gorges cut by the rivers are spanned by many bridges and viaducts, including the Adolphe Bridge, the Grand Duchess Charlotte Bridge and the Passerelle. Although Luxembourg City is not particularly large, its layout is complex, as the city is set on several levels, straddling hills and dropping into the two gorges.

Luxembourg City covers an area of over 51 km^{2} (20 sq mi), or 2% of the Grand Duchy's total area. This makes the city the fourth-largest commune in Luxembourg and by far the largest urban area. Luxembourg City is not particularly densely populated, at about 2,600 people per km^{2}; large areas of Luxembourg City are maintained as parks, forested areas, or sites of important heritage (particularly the UNESCO sites), while there are also large tracts of farmland within the city limits.

=== Districts of Luxembourg City ===
Luxembourg City is subdivided into twenty-four districts (French: quartiers), which cover the commune in its entirety. The districts generally correspond to the major neighbourhoods and suburbs of Luxembourg City, although a few of the historic districts, such as Bonnevoie, are divided between two districts.

=== Climate ===
Luxembourg City has an oceanic climate (Cfb), with moderate precipitation, cold to cool winters and warm summers. It is cloudy about two-thirds of the year.

Climate data for Luxembourg Airport (LUX), elevation: 368 m (1,207 ft) (1991–2020 normals, extremes 1947–present)
Month	Jan	Feb	Mar	Apr	May	Jun	Jul	Aug	Sep	Oct	Nov	Dec	Year
Record high °C (°F)	13.9 (57.0)	19.8 (67.6)	23.5 (74.3)	27.9 (82.2)	31.6 (88.9)	35.4 (95.7)	39.0 (102.2)	37.9 (100.2)	32.2 (90.0)	26.0 (78.8)	19.8 (67.6)	15.7 (60.3)	39.0 (102.2)
Mean daily maximum °C (°F)	3.8 (38.8)	5.2 (41.4)	9.8 (49.6)	14.4 (57.9)	18.4 (65.1)	21.7 (71.1)	23.9 (75.0)	23.5 (74.3)	19.0 (66.2)	13.5 (56.3)	7.7 (45.9)	4.5 (40.1)	13.8 (56.8)
Daily mean °C (°F)	1.4 (34.5)	2.2 (36.0)	5.7 (42.3)	9.6 (49.3)	13.5 (56.3)	16.7 (62.1)	18.7 (65.7)	18.4 (65.1)	14.3 (57.7)	9.9 (49.8)	5.2 (41.4)	2.3 (36.1)	9.8 (49.6)
Mean daily minimum °C (°F)	−1.0 (30.2)	−0.7 (30.7)	2.0 (35.6)	5.1 (41.2)	8.7 (47.7)	11.8 (53.2)	13.8 (56.8)	13.6 (56.5)	10.3 (50.5)	6.6 (43.9)	2.8 (37.0)	0.0 (32.0)	6.1 (43.0)
Record low °C (°F)	−17.8 (0.0)	−20.2 (−4.4)	−14.4 (6.1)	−6.9 (19.6)	−2.1 (28.2)	0.9 (33.6)	4.5 (40.1)	4.3 (39.7)	−0.7 (30.7)	−4.6 (23.7)	−11.1 (12.0)	−15.3 (4.5)	−20.2 (−4.4)
Average precipitation mm (inches)	72.0 (2.83)	59.0 (2.32)	57.0 (2.24)	49.0 (1.93)	71.2 (2.80)	75.6 (2.98)	71.5 (2.81)	71.9 (2.83)	66.2 (2.61)	76.6 (3.02)	72.1 (2.84)	89.4 (3.52)	831.5 (32.74)
Average precipitation days (≥ 1.0 mm)	11.7	10.3	10.3	8.7	10.0	9.9	9.9	9.2	8.6	10.4	12.2	13.1	124.3
Average snowy days	7.5	7.6	3.6	1.5	0.0	0.0	0.0	0.0	0.0	0.1	2.3	6.8	29.4
Average relative humidity (%)	88	83	74	67	68	68	67	68	75	84	89	90	77
Average dew point °C (°F)	−0.5 (31.1)	−0.7 (30.7)	1.0 (33.8)	3.0 (37.4)	7.1 (44.8)	10.1 (50.2)	11.7 (53.1)	11.8 (53.2)	9.6 (49.3)	7.1 (44.8)	3.5 (38.3)	0.7 (33.3)	5.4 (41.7)
Mean monthly sunshine hours	52.0	79.5	137.1	197.5	226.3	241.2	257.6	237.1	174.9	106.7	51.1	41.9	1,802.9
Source: Meteolux

== Demographics ==
Historical population
Year	Pop.	±%
1821	15,091	—
1851	21,754	+44.2%
1871	26,303	+20.9%
1880	30,205	+14.8%
1890	32,767	+8.5%
1900	39,488	+20.5%
1910	45,169	+14.4%
1922	46,530	+3.0%
1930	53,837	+15.7%
1935	57,822	+7.4%
1947	61,996	+7.2%
1960	71,653	+15.6%
1970	76,159	+6.3%
1981	78,912	+3.6%
1991	75,833	−3.9%
2001	76,688	+1.1%
2011	95,058	+24.0%
2021	128,097	+34.8%
Source: STATEC

As of 2021, 51.9% of the population are male and 48.1% are female. People younger than 15 years old make up 13.0% of the population, and people 65 years old or older make up 12.0%.

=== Immigration ===
As of 2021, immigrants make up 72.7% of the total population. 49.1% were born in other countries of the European Union, and 23.6% were born outside of the European Union.

== Government ==
=== Local government ===
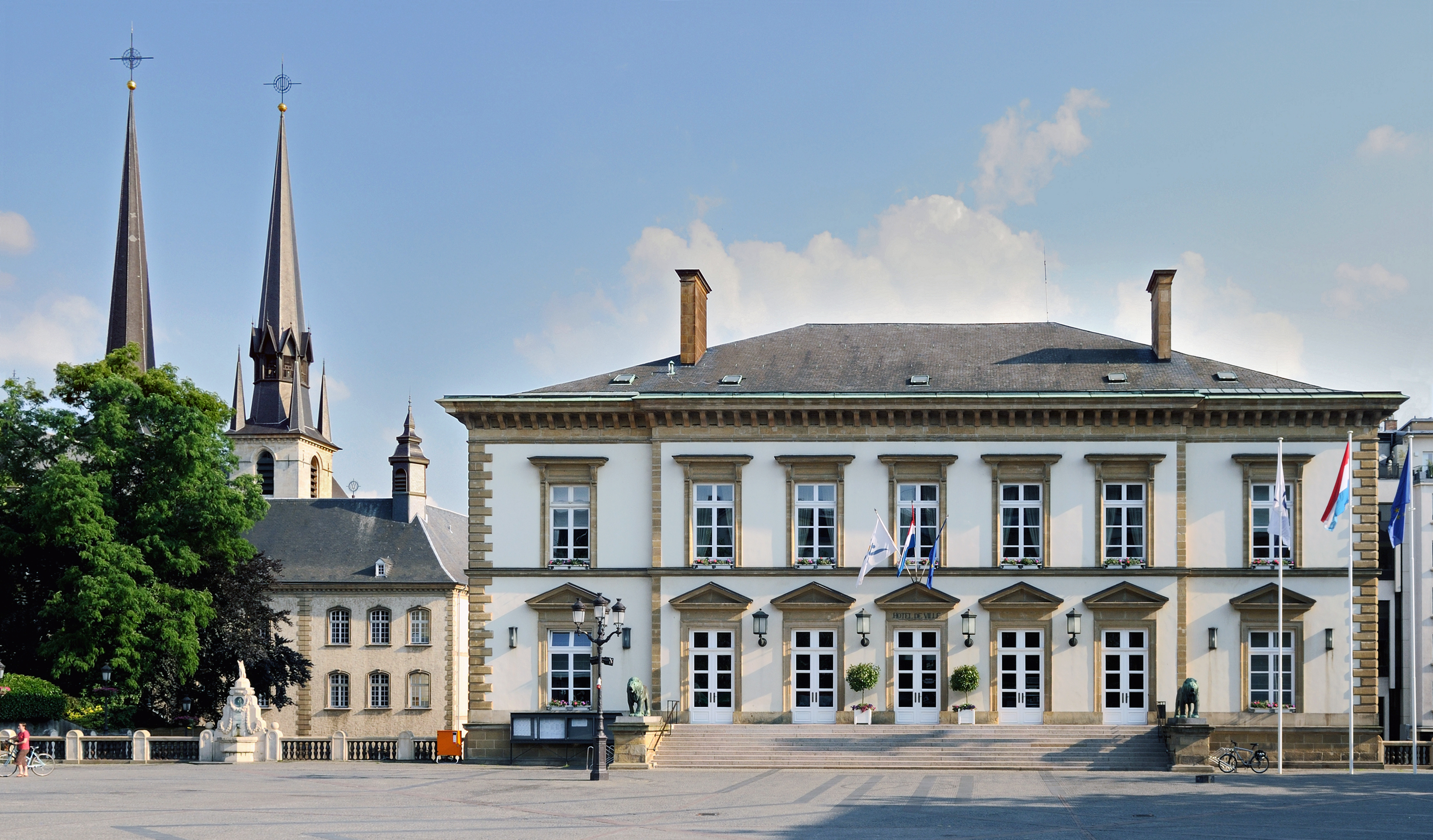
Luxembourg City Hall is the heart of the communal administration and hosts the offices of both the communal council and the mayor.

Under the Luxembourgish constitution, local government is centred on the city's communal council. Consisting of twenty-seven members (fixed since 1964), each elected every six years on the second Sunday of October and taking office on 1 January of the next year, the council is the largest of all communal councils in Luxembourg. The city is considered a stronghold of the Democratic Party (DP), which has provided its mayor without interruption since 1969 and is the second-largest party nationally. The Democratic Party is the largest party on the council, with ten councillors.

The city's administration is headed by the mayor, who is the leader of the largest party on the communal council. After Xavier Bettel became Luxembourg's new prime minister on 4 December 2013, Lydie Polfer (DP), who had already been in office from 1982 to 1999, was sworn in as new mayor of Luxembourg on 17 December of the same year. Since the last elections the mayor leads the cabinet, the College of Aldermen, in which the DP forms a coalition with the CSV. Unlike other cities in Luxembourg, which are limited to four aldermen at most, Luxembourg is given special dispensation to have six aldermen on its college.

=== National government ===
The Plateau de Kirchberg has many new buildings including those for the European Institutions.

Luxembourg City is the seat for the Luxembourg Government. The Grand Ducal Family of Luxembourg lives at Berg Castle in Colmar-Berg.

For national elections to the Chamber of Deputies, the city is located in the Centre constituency.

=== European institutions ===
Luxembourg City is the seat of several institutions, agencies and bodies of the European Union, including the Court of Justice of the European Union, the European Commission, the secretariat of the European Parliament, the European Court of Auditors and the European Investment Bank. The majority of these institutions are located in the Kirchberg quarter, in the northeast of the city.

== Culture ==
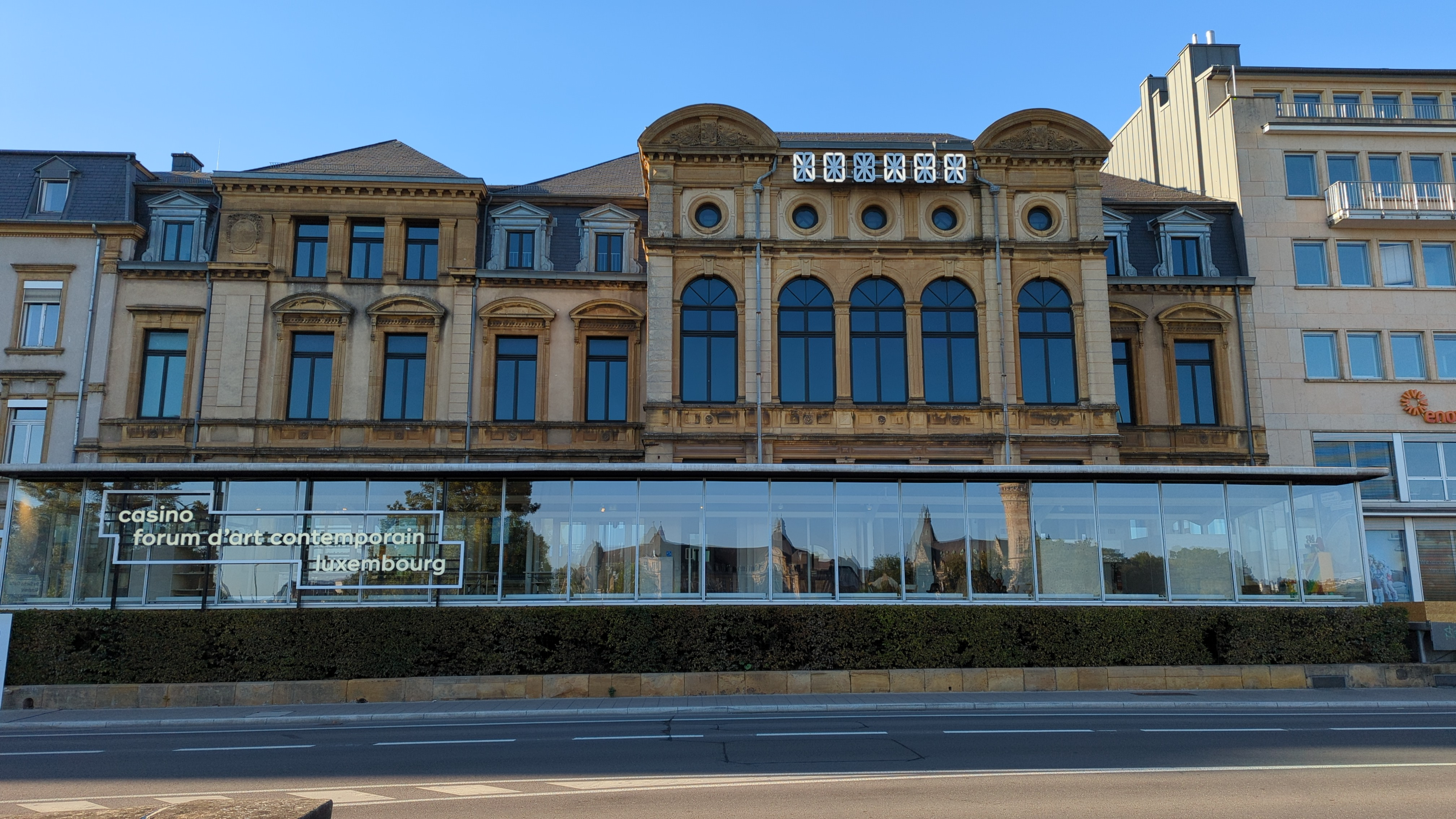
Casino Luxembourg is used for exhibitions of local art.

Grand Théâtre de Luxembourg

Luxembourg City is home to several notable museums: the National Museum of Archaeology, History and Art (MNAHA), the Luxembourg City History Museum, the Grand Duke Jean Museum of Modern Art (MUDAM), the National Museum of Natural History (MNHN) and the Luxembourg City Tram and Bus Museum.

In addition to its two municipal theatres, the Grand Théâtre de Luxembourg and the Théâtre des Capucins, there is the Philharmonie concert hall, as well as a conservatory with a large auditorium. Art galleries include the Villa Vauban, the Casino Luxembourg and Am Tunnel.

Luxembourg was the first city to be named European Capital of Culture twice. The first time was in 1995. In 2007, along with the Romanian city of Sibiu, the European Capital of Culture was the cross-border area (Greater Region of SaarLorLux or Grande Région) consisting of the Grand Duchy of Luxembourg, Rhineland-Palatinate and Saarland in Germany, the Wallonia and the German-speaking Community of Belgium, and also the Lorraine region in France. The event was an attempt to promote mobility and the exchange of ideas, crossing borders in all areas, physical, psychological, artistic and emotional.

Luxembourg City is also famed for its wide selection of restaurants and cuisines, including four Michelin starred establishments.

=== UNESCO World Heritage Site ===
The city of Luxembourg is on the UNESCO World Heritage List as City of Luxembourg: its Old Quarters and Fortifications, on account of the historical importance of its fortifications. The site is located mainly in the Ville Haute (Uewerstad).

=== Sport ===
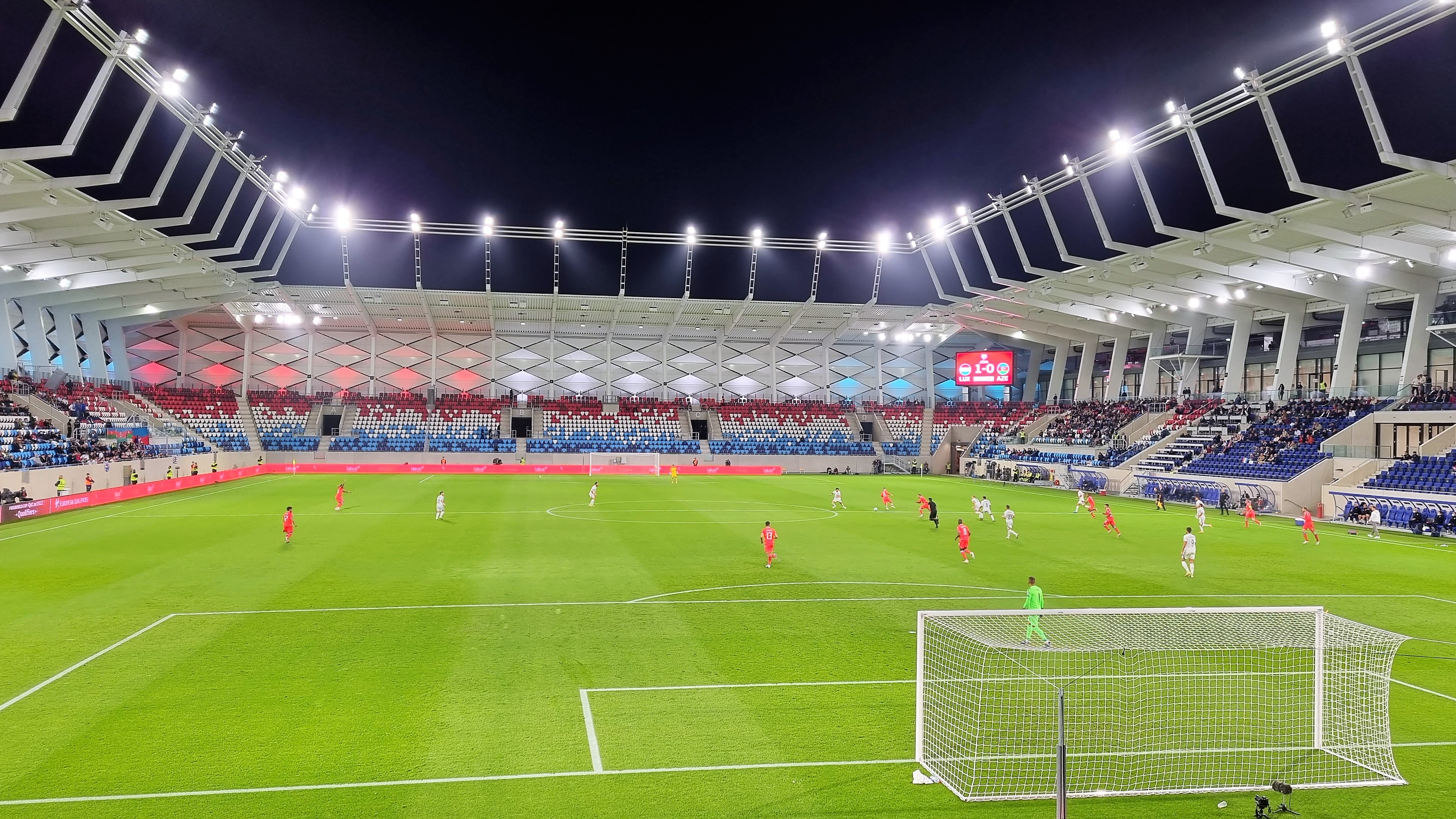
Stade de Luxembourg

The ING Luxembourg Marathon has been contested annually in the capital since June 2006. It attracted 11,000 runners and over 100,000 spectators during the 2014 edition.

The Luxembourg Open is a tennis tournament held since 1991 in the capital. The tournament runs from 13 to 21 October. BGL BNP Paribas, one of the more famous sponsors in the world of tennis, was the contracted title sponsor of the tournament until 2014.

The Stade de Luxembourg, situated in Gasperich, southern Luxembourg City, is the country's national stadium and largest sports venue in the country with a capacity of 9,386 for sporting events, including football and rugby union, and 15,000 for concerts. The largest arena in the country is d'Coque, Kirchberg, north-eastern Luxembourg City, which has a capacity of 8,300. The arena is used for basketball, handball, gymnastics and volleyball, including the final of the 2007 Women's European Volleyball Championship. D'Coque also includes an Olympic-size swimming pool.

The two football clubs of the city of Luxembourg; Racing FC Union Luxembourg and F.C. Luxembourg City, play in the country's highest league, the BGL Ligue, and second-tier, Division of Honour, respectively. The Stade de Luxembourg hosts the Luxembourg national football team.

== Places of interest ==
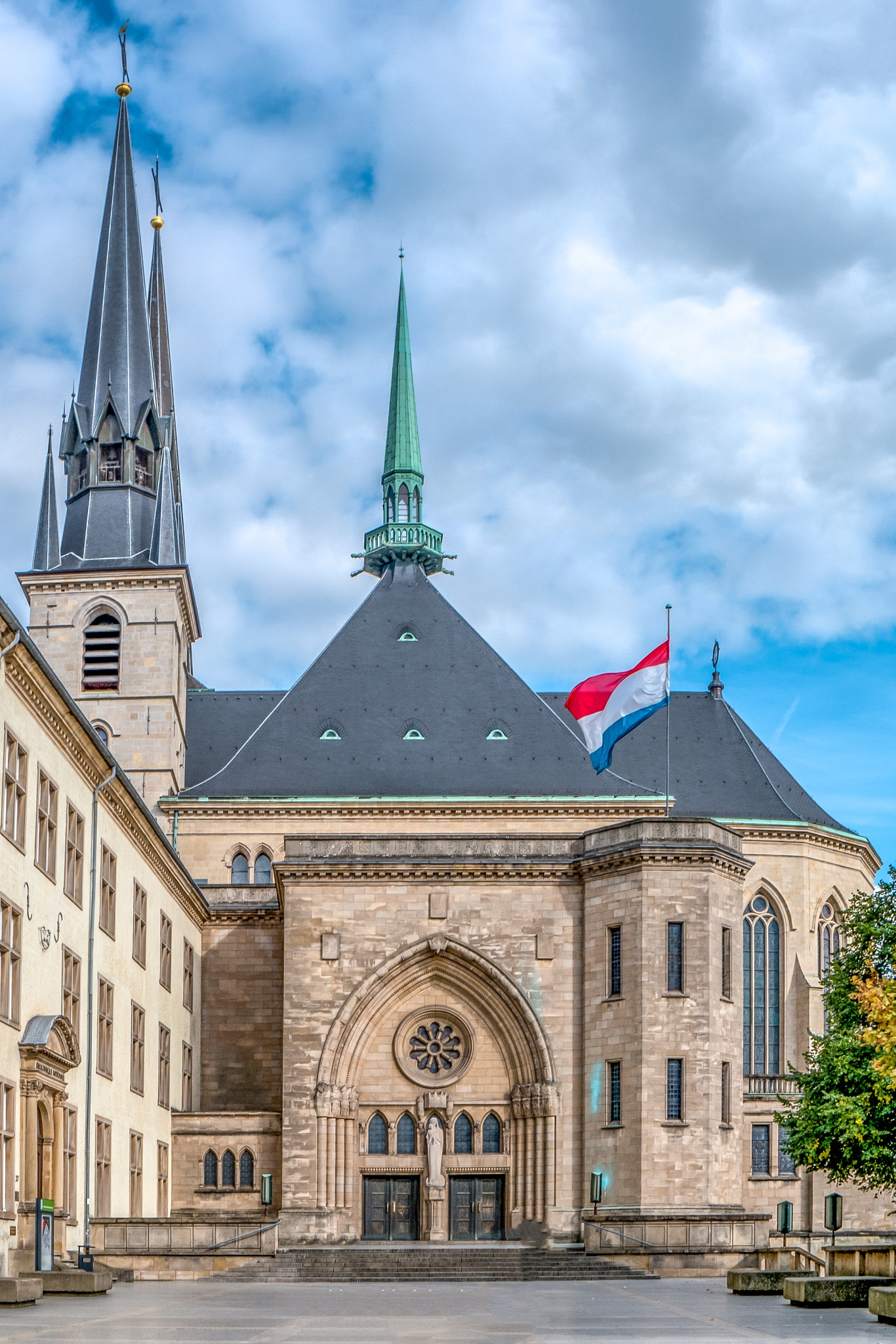
Cathedral Our Lady of Luxembourg, West entrance

Places of interest include the Gothic Revival Notre-Dame Cathedral, the fortifications, Am Tunnel (an art gallery underground), the Grand Ducal Palace, the Gëlle Fra war memorial, the casemates, the Neimënster Abbey, the Place d'Armes, the Adolphe Bridge and the city hall. The city is home to the RTL Group.

The Second World War Luxembourg American Cemetery and Memorial is located within the city limits of Luxembourg at Hamm. This cemetery is the final resting place of 5,076 American military dead, including General George S. Patton. There is also a memorial to 371 Americans whose remains were never recovered or identified.

== Parks and green spaces ==
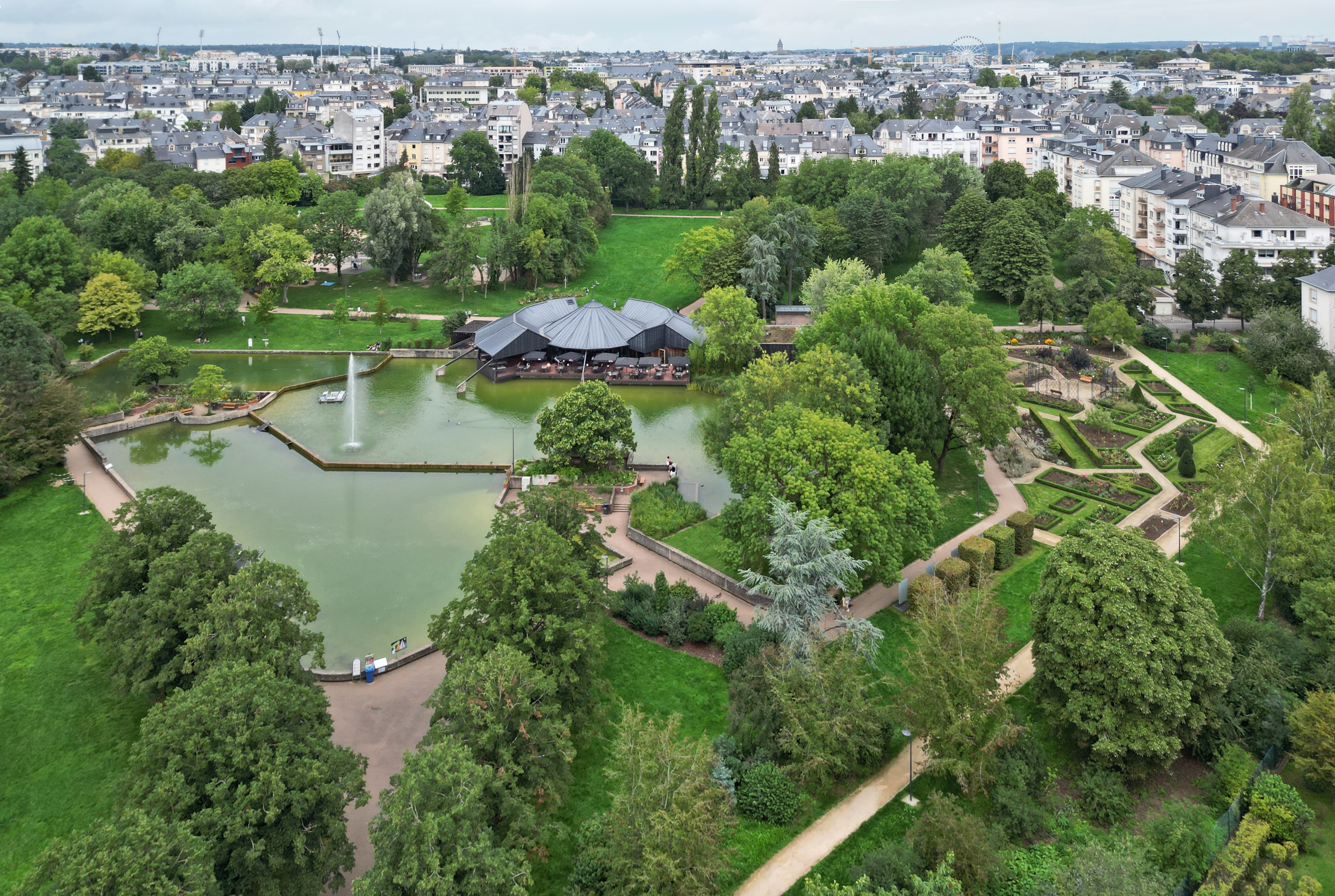
Parc de Merl in the west of the city

Green spaces make up a considerable proportion of Luxembourg City's land area. The city encompasses 1,055 hectares (2,610 acres) of urban forest (roughly 20% of its land area), including a 679-hectare (1,680-acre) portion of the Bambësch forest to the northwest. A tree register has been held by the city since the early 1990s; the May 2025 version listed a total of 23,126 trees across the city, up from 19,914 in 2016. Parks and green spaces are maintained by the city's Parks Service (Service Parcs), created in 1939 and which has been an independent service since 1961.

The Parks Service lists 15 parks or park-like green spaces within Luxembourg City. The largest of these, with an area of around 19 hectares (47 acres), is Édouard André Municipal Park, also known as the "city park" (Stater Park); designed between 1871 and 1878 by French landscape architect Édouard André, it was created on the site of fortifications demolished following the 1867 Treaty of London. It notably features the Villa Louvigny, the long-time headquarters of RTL that served as the venue of the Eurovision Song Contest in 1962 and 1966, the Villa Vauban art museum and a number of sculptures and memorials.

Other parks include Parc de Merl, located between Hollerich, Merl and Belair, and also the 4.6-hectare (11-acre) Parc Tony-Neuman in Limpertsberg.

== Transport ==
=== Highways ===
Luxembourg is situated in the heart of Europe in the Gold Triangle between Frankfurt, Paris and Amsterdam. It is therefore connected to several motorways and international routes. In fact, almost all motorway in Luxembourg pass through here.

- A1 (E44): to Grevenmacher and Trier (Germany).
- A3 (E25): to Dudelange and Thionville (France).
- A4: to Esch-sur-Alzette and to A13 to Pétange, Athus (Belgium) and Longwy (France).
- A6 (E25 / E411): to Arlon and Brussels.
- A7 (E421): to Mersch and Ettelbruck.

=== Public transport ===
Public transport in Luxembourg City, like in the rest of country, has been free since 29 February 2020, including rail, bus and tram.

==== Rail ====
Luxembourg City's territory is served by five railway stations operated by the state railway company, the Société Nationale des Chemins de Fer Luxembourgeois (CFL): Cents-Hamm, Dommeldange, Hollerich, Pfaffenthal-Kirchberg and the principal station, which is terminus of all rail lines in the country, Luxembourg railway station. Stations in Luxembourg City are served by domestic rail services operated by CFL, as well as international rail services, operated by CFL, German, Belgian and French service providers. Additionally, Luxembourg station is connected to the French LGV Est network, providing high-speed services on to Paris and Strasbourg. Services to Basel and Zurich in Switzerland are available via two daily scheduled international trains.

==== Bus ====
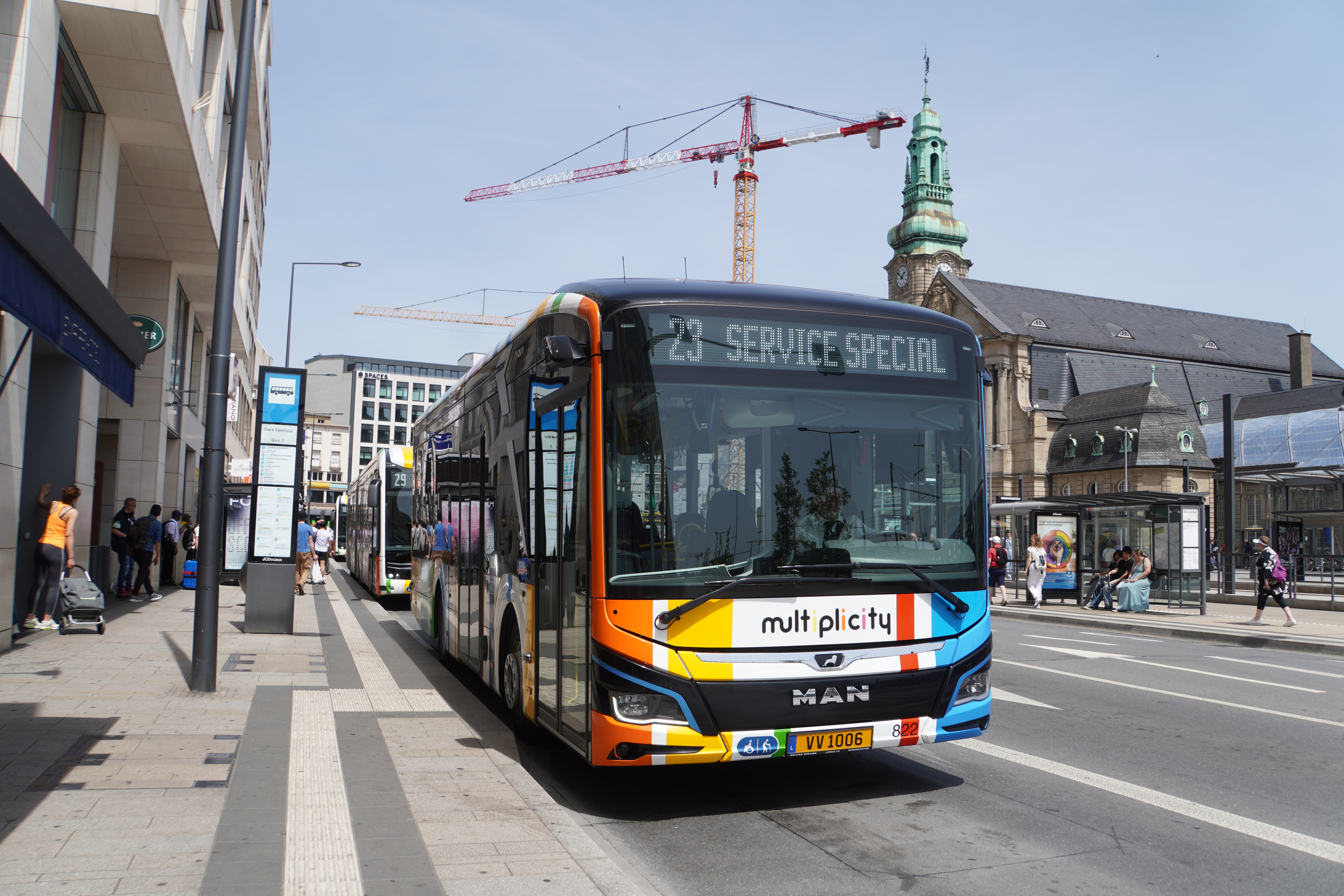
AVL Bus 822 (VV 1006), a 12-meter MAN Lion's City E

Luxembourg City has a network of 30 bus lines, operated by the municipal transport authority, Autobus de la Ville de Luxembourg (AVL), partly subcontracted to private bus companies and carrying 40 million passengers a year. There is also a "City night network". A "Park & Ride" scheme is operated by the city with five carparks connected to the bus and tram network. In addition to AVL buses, CFL and RGTR operate regional buses from the city to the rest of Luxembourg and nearby cities in Germany and France.

==== Tram ====
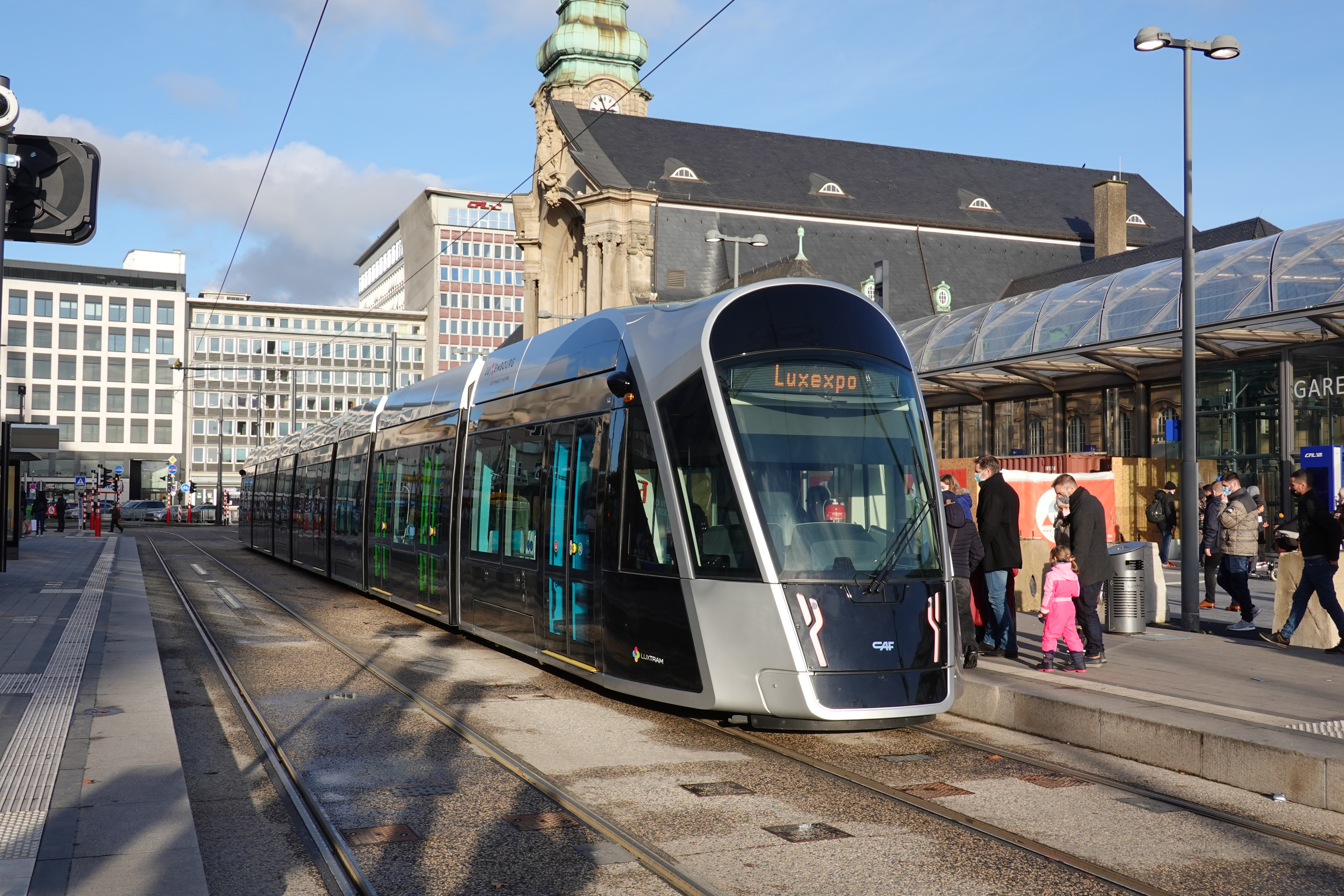
Tramway at Luxembourg railway station

Between 1875 and 1964, the city was covered by an extensive tram network. In December 2017, trams were reintroduced to the city, with the phased opening of a new line T1, completed in March 2025, which runs between Luxembourg Airport and the Stade de Luxembourg, via the city centre. The network is expected to have 4 lines by 2035, with future lines in the planning stages as of 2022.

=== Air ===
Luxembourg City is served by the only international airport in the country: Luxembourg Airport (codes: IATA: LUX, ICAO: ELLX). Accessibility to the airport, situated in the commune of Sandweiler, 6 kilometres (3.7 mi) from the city centre, is provided via lines 6, 16 and 29 of the municipal bus network, and also line T1 of the city tramway, which terminates there since 2 March 2025. The airport is the principal hub for Luxembourg's flag carrier, Luxair and one of the world's largest cargo airlines, Cargolux.

== International relations ==
Luxembourg is a member of the QuattroPole union of cities, along with Trier, Saarbrücken and Metz (neighbouring countries: Germany and France).

=== Twin towns – Sister cities ===
Luxembourg City is twinned with:

- Metz, France
- Tambov Oblast, Russia
- Prague, Czech Republic

== See also ==
- Eurovision Song Contest 1962
- Eurovision Song Contest 1966
- Eurovision Song Contest 1973
- Eurovision Song Contest 1984
- Limes Luxemburgensis

== Bibliography ==
- Kirch, Roland (2024). "Trees in the City: History, species and care" (PDF). vdl.lu. Service Parcs de la Ville de Luxembourg.
- Kreins, Jean-Marie (2003). Histoire du Luxembourg (in French) (3rd ed.). Paris: Presses Universitaires de France. ISBN 978-2-13-053852-3.
- Kunnert, Jemp (April 1986). "Moments d'urbanisme" (PDF). Ons Stad (in French) (21): 2–5. Archived from the original (PDF) on 3 August 2026.
- Philippart, Robert L. (May 2021). "La ville intègre sa périphérie" (PDF). Ons Stad (in French) (123): 18–23. Archived from the original (PDF) on 5 October 2025.
- Thewes, Guy; Wagener, Danièle (June 1995). "La Ville de Luxembourg en 1795" (PDF). Ons Stad (in French) (49): 4–7. Archived from the original (PDF) on 28 August 2026.
- Thewes, Guy (December 2002). "Nationalsozialistische Architektur in Luxemburg" (PDF). Ons Stad (in German) (71): 25–29. Archived from the original (PDF) on 5 February 2026.
- Thewes, Guy (April 2004). "L'évacuation des déchets de la vie urbaine sous l'Ancien Régime" (PDF). Ons Stad (in French) (75): 30–33. Archived from the original (PDF) on 11 March 2026.
- Thewes, Guy (April 2012). "Le «grand renfermement» - La ville à l'âge de la forteresse" (PDF). Ons Stad (in French) (99): 10–13. Archived from the original (PDF) on 1 October 2023.
- Thewes, Guy (May 2011). Les gouvernements du Grand-Duché de Luxembourg depuis 1848 (PDF) (in French). Luxembourg City: Service Information et Presse. ISBN 978-2-87999-212-9.
- Thewes, Guy (December 2013). "Luxembourg, ville dangereuse sous l'Ancien Régime? – Police et sécurité au XVIIIe siècle" (PDF). Ons Stad (in French) (104): 58–61. Archived from the original (PDF) on 9 February 2026.
