= Limes Luxemburgensis =

Archeological project

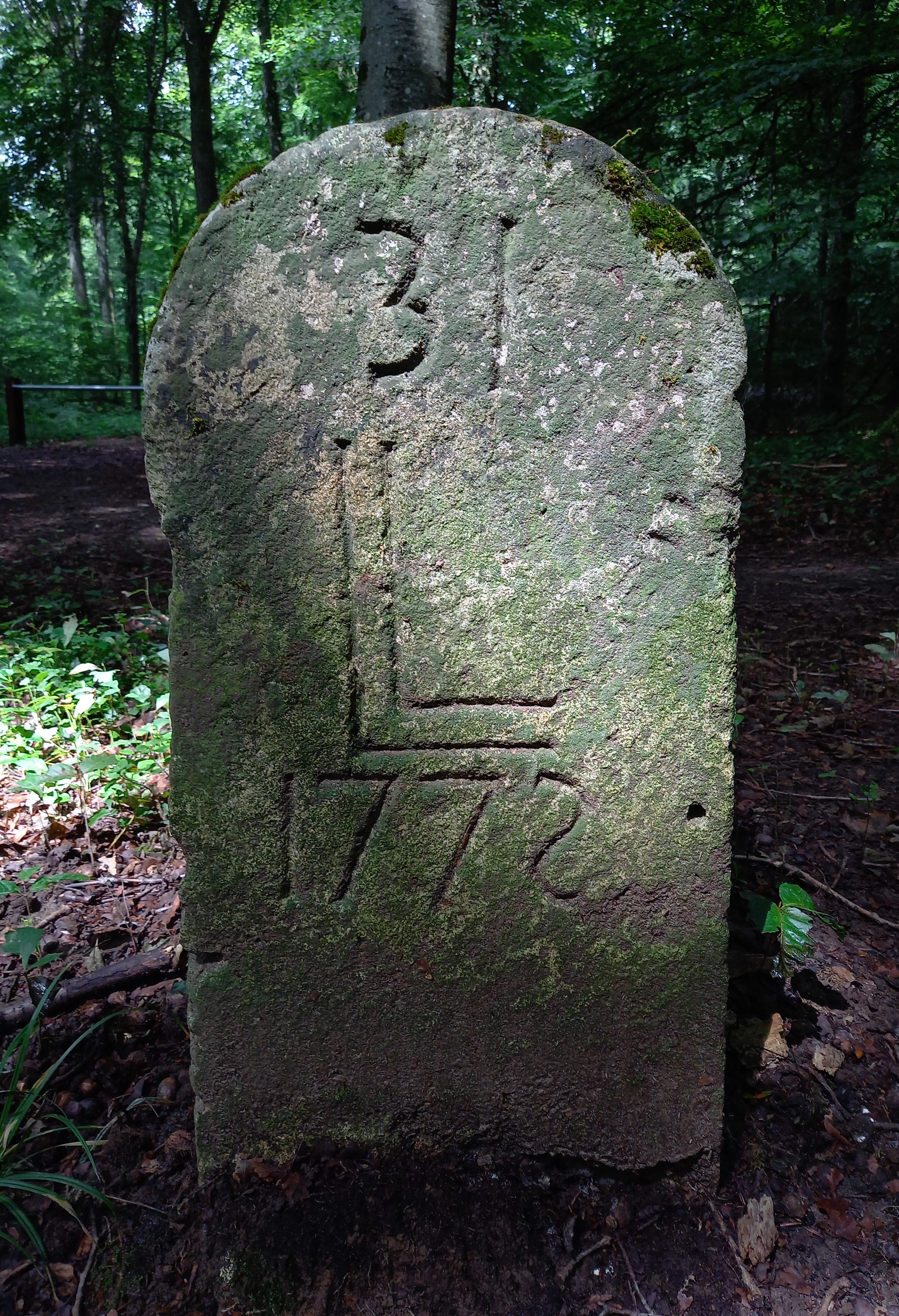
- Original author: M.T. Carrasco Benitez
- Website: limes.lu

Nicolas de Jamez, Chief Engineer of the Fortress of Luxembourg, demarcated in 1772 the Bambësch forest that belonged to the City of Luxembourg, during the reign of Her Majesty Maria Theresa of Austria, Duchess of Luxembourg which was one of her many titles. This demarcation is the Limes Luxemburgensis (LL): 94 stone markers numbered 1 to 94 were put in place, accompanied by the 1772 LL map. Each marker has the following inscription: a unique consecutive number, the letters LL and the year 1772. As of today, 63 markers have been located and photographed.

Most markers are placed along paths and they are easily visible; for example, along the Maarkewee (markers path), though they could be shrouded by vegetation and visibility can change rapidly due to forestry work. Markers 58, 59, and 60 near a road can be seen with Google Street View. Most markers further away from paths are accessible walking on the forest, though in some sections thick vegetation makes walking very difficult.

LL is not a closed circle as there was no need to demarcate the Rollingergrund section towards the center of the City of Luxembourg. Markers are placed on average every 84 meters, though it varies from 41 meters to 220 meters. The total LL length between markers 1 to 94 following all the markers is 9,098.52 meters, equal to 4,668.3 toises, the distance unit used in the 1772 LL map. The undemarcated Rollingergrund section is approximately 1,600 meters, going directly from marker 1 to 94. About 10,700 meters in total, adding the LL proper and the [Rollingergrund section.

Markers 59, 60 and 88 have the additional inscription CC 1997 that seems to suggest that they were placed in 1997. Inscriptions are on the face of the marker towards the Bambësch; marker 33 faces the wrong direction; markers 19 and 20 show the back (the inscription is on the other side) looking from the path, as the path is outside the boundary. Probably some markers have been replaced at different times, as the stone weathering differs; markers 34, 35, 37, 53, 54, 59, 60, and 88 look recent.

Markers 40 and 60 correspond to the beginning and end of the border with Her Majesty forest. Marker 70 corresponds to a LL 90º turn. It might be a coincidence, but these three special markers end in 0.
