= European Regional Development Fund =

Financial instrument

The European Regional Development Fund for 2021–2027

The European Regional Development Fund (ERDF) is one of the European Structural and Investment Funds allocated by the European Union. Its purpose is to transfer money from richer regions (not countries), and invest it in the infrastructure and services of underdeveloped regions. This will allow those regions to start attracting private sector investments, and create jobs on their own.

== History ==
During the 1960s, the European Commission occasionally tried to establish a regional fund, but only Italy ever supported it. Britain made it an issue for its accession in 1973, and pushed for its creation at the 1972 summit in Paris. Britain was going to be a large contributor to the CAP and the EEC budget, and sought to offset this deficit by having the ERDF established. They would then be able to show their public some tangible benefits of EEC membership. The ERDF was set to be running by 1973, but the 1973 oil crisis delayed it, and it was only established in 1975 under considerable British and Italian pressure.

It started with a budget of 1.4 billion units of account (equivalent to the euro), much less than the original British proposal of 2.4 billion units of account, but has increased rapidly both proportionally and absolutely in the course of time. Since its creation, it has operated under changing set of rules that were standardised with Single European Act and is now in its 2014–2020 period.

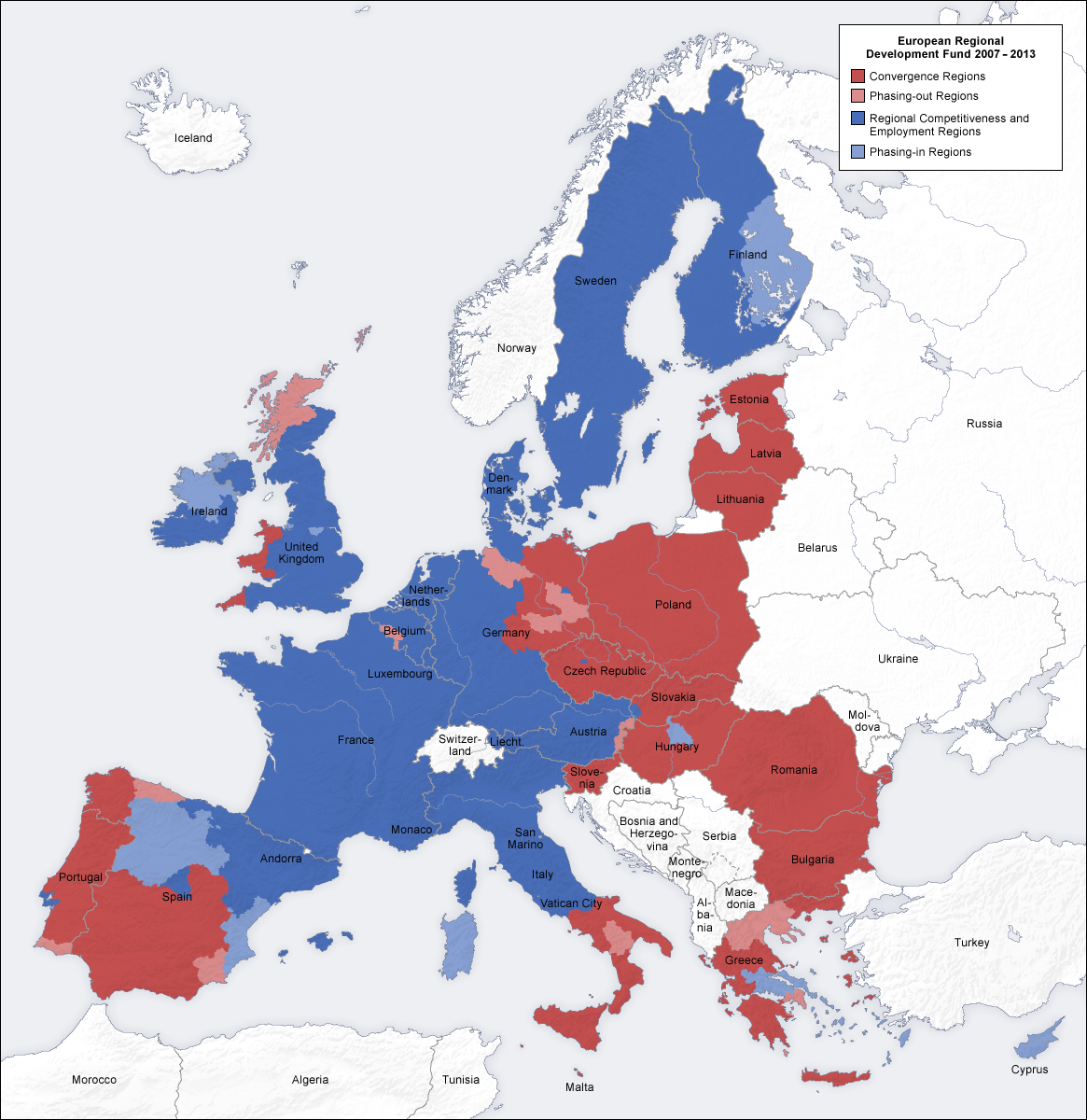
The European Regional Development Fund, 2007–2013

== Scope (2014–2020) ==
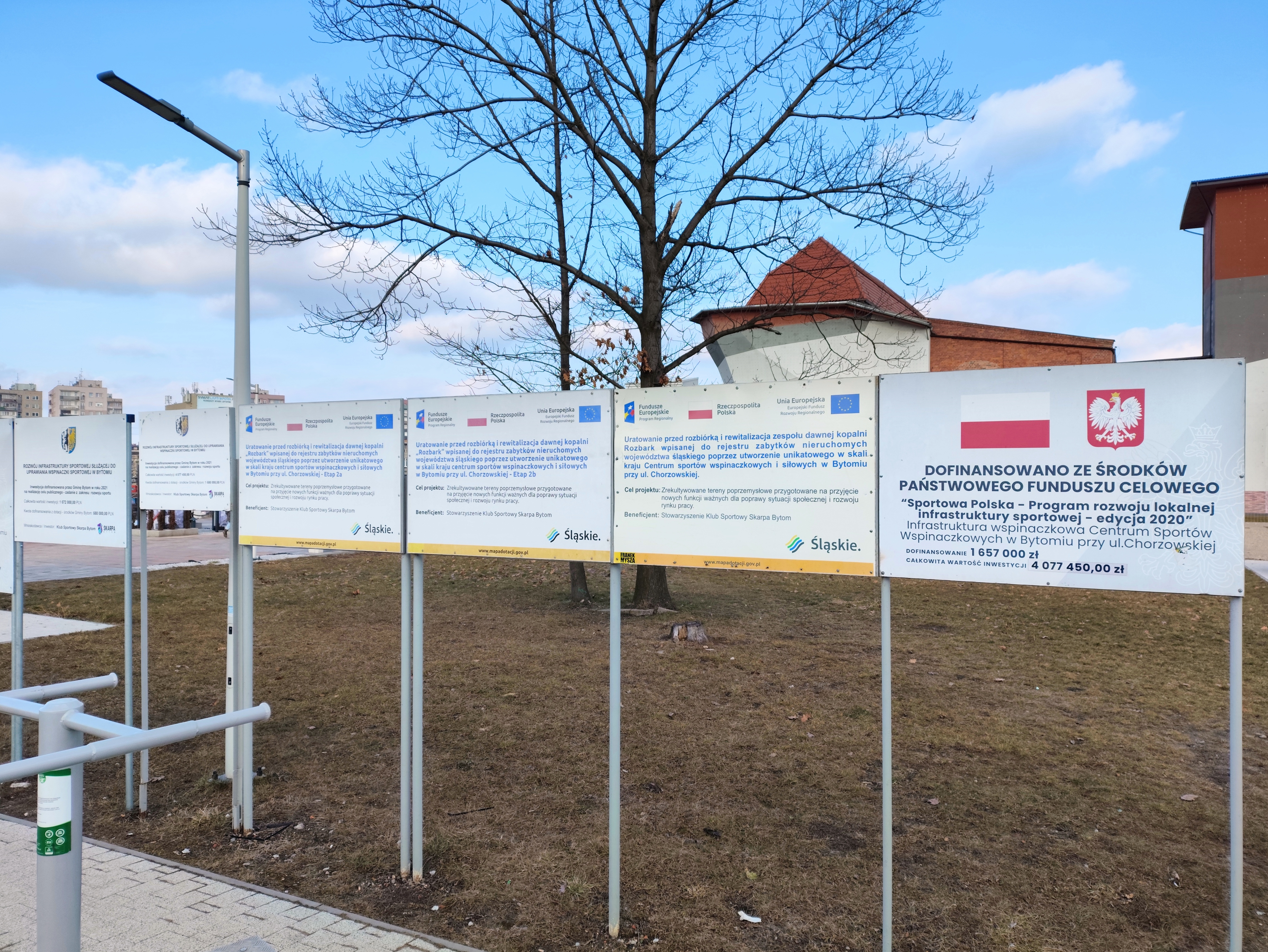
Info signs of European Regional Development Fund at monument renovation site in Poland

As part of its task to promote regional development, the ERDF contributes towards financing the following measures:

=== Objective convergence ===
- Modernising and diversifying economic structures
- Creating sustainable jobs
- Stimulating economic growth
- Attention to urban, remote, mountainous, sparsely populated, and the outermost regions

=== Regional competitiveness and employment ===
- Innovation and knowledge economy (e.g., research and technological development, innovation and entrepreneurship, financial engineering)
- Environment and risk prevention (e.g., cleaning up polluted areas, energy efficiency, clean urban public transport, risk prevention plans)
- Access to transport and telecommunications

=== Territorial cooperation ===
- Cross-border economic, social, and environmental activities
- Transnational cooperation, including bilateral cooperation between maritime regions
- Inter-regional cooperation, including networking and exchange of experiences between regional and local authorities

== Scope (2021–2027) ==
For the period 2021–2027, a new set of goals is set out. These are summarised under five headings:

- more competitive and smarter
- greener
- more connected
- more social
- closer to citizens

The funding available for this is part of the Cohesion Policy budget, which in total is EUR 392 billion; the Cohesion Policy budget also covers the Cohesion Fund, the European Social Fund Plus, and the Just Transition Fund.

== ERDF compliance ==
All awards of ERDF must comply with European Union competition law (including State Aid Law and Government procurement in the European Union). Failure to comply with these legal requirements may result in irregularity rulings which carry financial implications.

== Criticism ==
One project supported by the Fund is the Golf Club Campo de Golf in the African Spanish exclave Melilla, located right next to the border with Morocco where African migrants regularly attempt to enter the territory of the EU by climbing a triple fence with razor wire. In 2009, Ecologists in Action called the location insulting and asked the EU to investigate why more than €1.1 million was given to the project by the ERDF. The petition was dismissed, because the objectives of the golf course to “increase tourism, create jobs and promote sport and sporting values” was compatible with the goals of the ERDF.

== See also ==
- European Structural and Investment Funds
- European Grouping for Territorial Cooperation
- Grande Région
- ENPI Italy–Tunisia CBC Programme
- Greece–Bulgaria European Territorial Cooperation Programme
- Venture capital in Poland
