= Merl, Luxembourg =

District of Luxembourg City, Luxembourg

Merl Märel (Luxembourgish)
- District
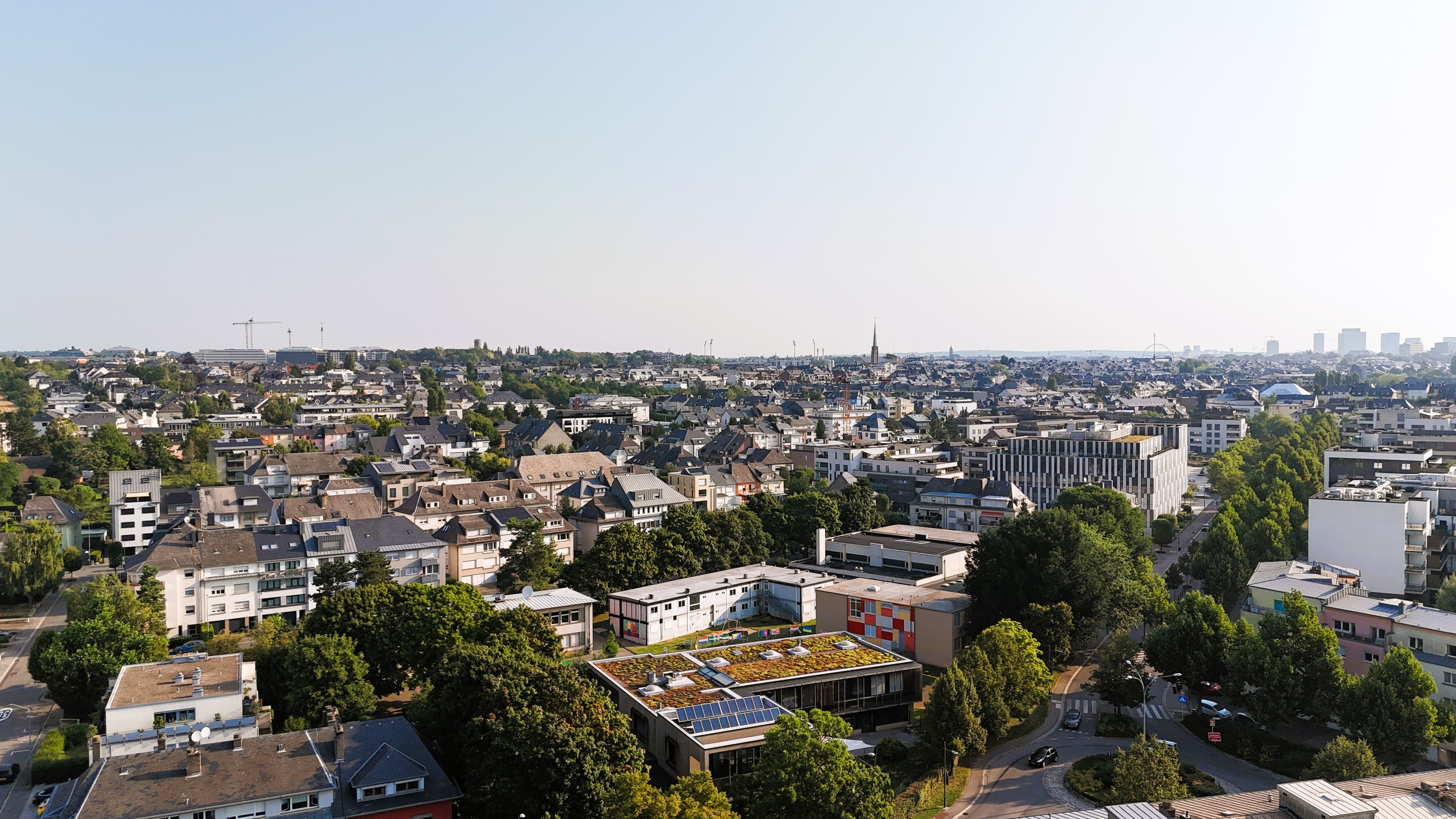

- Merl is one of 24 districts in Luxembourg City
- Coordinates: 49.603°N 6.096°E
- Country: Luxembourg
- Commune: Luxembourg City

Area
  - Total: 2.4281 km^{2} (0.9375 sq mi)

Population (31 December 2025)
  - Total: 6,602
  - Density: 2,719/km^{2} (7,042/sq mi)

Nationality
  - Luxembourgish: 31.81%
  - Other: 68.19%
- Website: Merl

Merl (German pronunciation: [ˈmɛʁl]; Luxembourgish: Märel, pronounced [ˈmɛːʀəl]) is a district in western Luxembourg City, in southern Luxembourg.

As of 31 December 2025, the district has a population of 6,602 inhabitants.
