= European route E421 =

Road in trans-European E-road network

E421

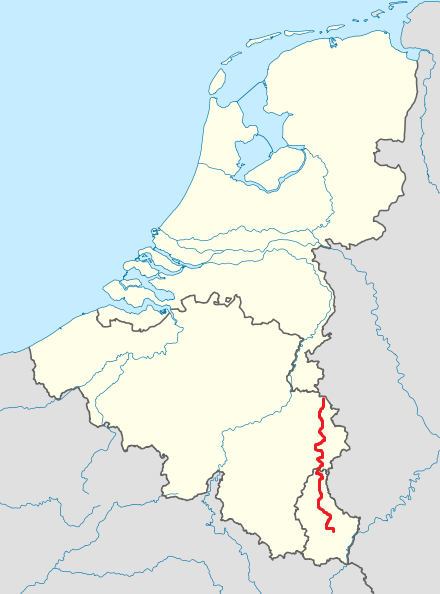

Major junctions
- From: Eynatten (Belgium)
- To: Luxembourg City (Luxembourg)

Location
- Countries: Belgium; Luxembourg

Highway system
- International E-road network; A Class; B Class

E 421 is a European B class road in Belgium and Luxembourg, connecting the cities Eynatten - Eupen - St. Vith - Luxembourg City

- Belgium
  - Eynatten, Eupen, St. Vith
- Luxembourg
  - Luxembourg City
