= Grande Région =

The Grande Région (French) or Großregion (German) programme lies within the Interreg IV A programme of the European Union's European Regional Development Fund. It facilitates cooperation between project partners from the different parts of the Greater Region of SaarLorLux: Luxembourg (the country), the Belgian provinces of Luxembourg and Liège, the French Lorraine region as well as the Saarland and large parts of Rhineland-Palatinate. The programme covers the period 2007-2013. Projects approved within the programme receive financial aid of up to 50% of their budget.

== History ==
The following programmes were forerunners of the current INTERREG IV Greater Region programme:

- Wallonia-Lorraine-Luxembourg
- Germany-Luxembourg-German Speaking Community of Belgium
- Saar-Moselle-Lorraine-Western Palatinate
- Rhineland-Palitinate RLP
- Interreg C "E-bird"

== Aims ==
The programme facilitates cross-border cooperation among the different stakeholders of the Greater Region and promotes the realisation of local and regional projects.

== Programme partners ==
Eleven bodies within the Greater Region are the programme partners:

- the government of Luxembourg, Ministry of Housing and Spatial Planning
- the government of Wallonia
- the government of the French community of Belgium
- the government of the German-speaking community of Belgium
- the council of the Meuse département in France
- the council of the Meurthe-et-Moselle département
- the council of the Moselle département]
- the préfecture of Lorraine region in France
- the Ministry of Economy, Transport, Agriculture and Viniculture of Rhineland-Palatinate in Germany
- the Ministry of Economy and Science of Saarland

== Programme ==
The programme has three main focuses: "economy", "space" and "humans".

It also strengthens the cross-border collaboration in film. With the laboratory of the Collaboration Across Border's, short CAB, the Greater Region supported authors and directors from the partner regions to work collaboratively across borders. The initial start to this production happened in Mainz hosted by the Arc Film Festival.

=== Economy ===
The aim is to boost competitiveness of the interregional economy, to promote innovation and improve the labour market.

- Scheme 1.1 – Promotion of innovation
- Scheme 1.2 – Promotion of common projects to strengthen the economic structure
- Scheme 1.3 – Development of cross-border economic infrastructure
- Scheme 1.4 – Encouragement of cross-border working
- Scheme 1.5 – Promotion of the tourist offer

=== Space ===
Improve the quality of life, enhance of the attractiveness of the different areas and protection of the environment.

- Scheme 2.1 – Promotion of spatial development policy
- Scheme 2.2 – Promotion of mobility in the Greater Region
- Scheme 2.3 – Upgrading and safeguarding of the environment

=== Humans ===
Promote acquisition and diffusion of knowledge, use of cultural resources and strengthening of social cohesion.

- Scheme 3.1 – Cooperation in education and continuing education
- Scheme 3.2 – Strengthening of university cooperation
- Scheme 3.3 – Encouragement of cooperation in health care management
- Scheme 3.4 – Encouragement of cooperation in social work
- Scheme 3.5 – Encouragement and upgrading of culture and cooperation in the media

== Approved projects ==
As of 2010 66 projects have been approved and will get financial support from Interreg.
