= 1554 =

1554 in various calendars
- Gregorian calendar: 1554; MDLIV
- Ab urbe condita: 2307
- Armenian calendar: 1003; ԹՎ ՌԳ
- Assyrian calendar: 6304
- Balinese saka calendar: 1475–1476
- Bengali calendar: 960–961
- Berber calendar: 2504
- English Regnal year: 1 Mar. 1 – 1 Ph. & M.
- Buddhist calendar: 2098
- Burmese calendar: 916
- Byzantine calendar: 7062–7063
- Chinese calendar: 癸丑年 (Water Ox); 4251 or 4044 — to — 甲寅年 (Wood Tiger); 4252 or 4045
- Coptic calendar: 1270–1271
- Discordian calendar: 2720
- Ethiopian calendar: 1546–1547
- Hebrew calendar: 5314–5315
- Hindu calendars
- Vikram Samvat: 1610–1611
- Shaka Samvat: 1475–1476
- Kali Yuga: 4654–4655
- Holocene calendar: 11554
- Igbo calendar: 554–555
- Iranian calendar: 932–933
- Islamic calendar: 961–962
- Japanese calendar: Tenbun 23 (天文２３年)
- Javanese calendar: 1472–1473
- Julian calendar: 1554; MDLIV
- Korean calendar: 3887
- Minguo calendar: 358 before ROC 民前358年
- Nanakshahi calendar: 86
- Thai solar calendar: 2096–2097
- Tibetan calendar: ཆུ་མོ་གླང་ལོ་ (female Water-Ox); 1680 or 1299 or 527 — to — ཤིང་ཕོ་སྟག་ལོ་ (male Wood-Tiger); 1681 or 1300 or 528

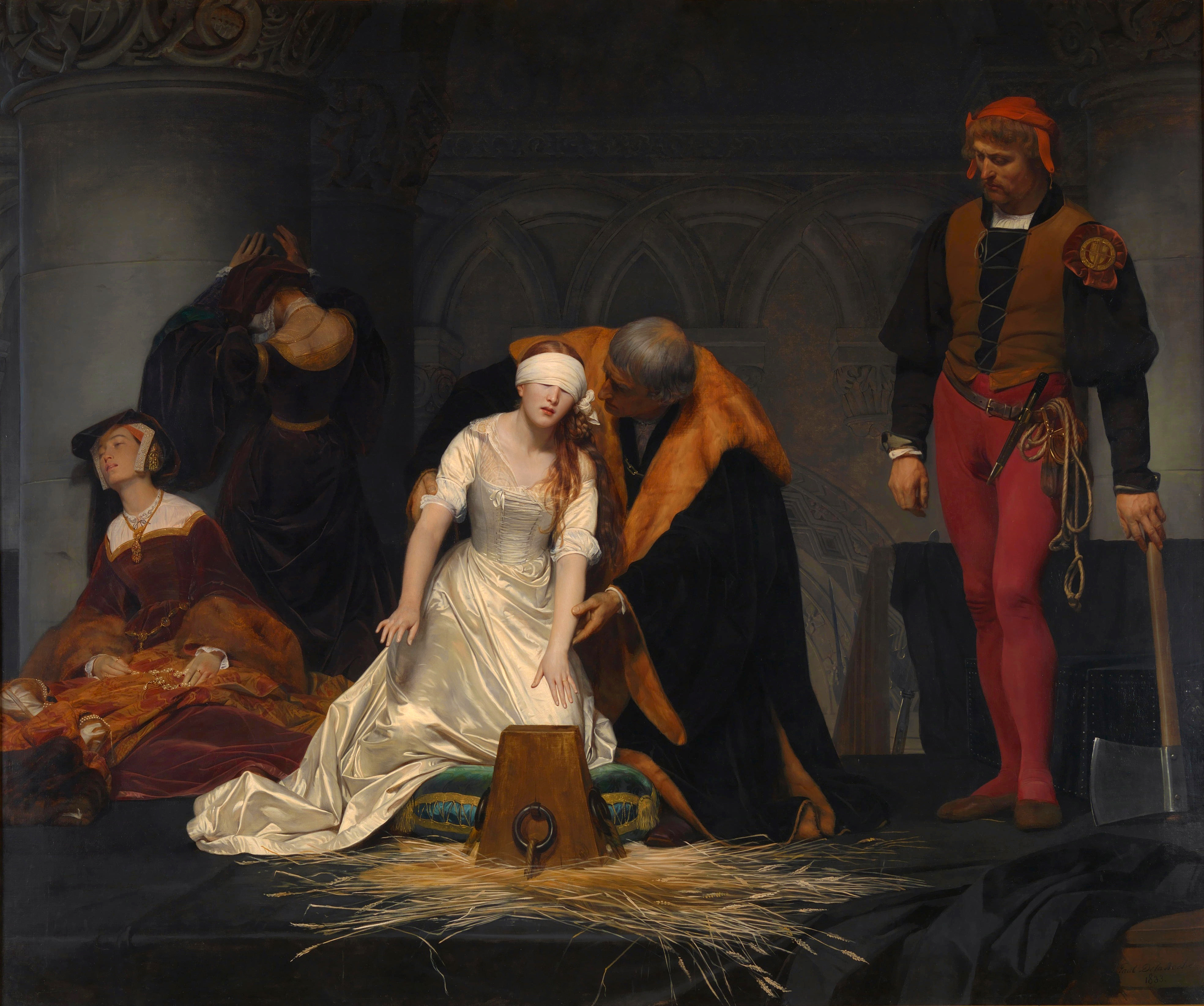
February 12: Lady Jane Grey, who was declared Queen of England for nine days in 1553, is beheaded at the Tower of London

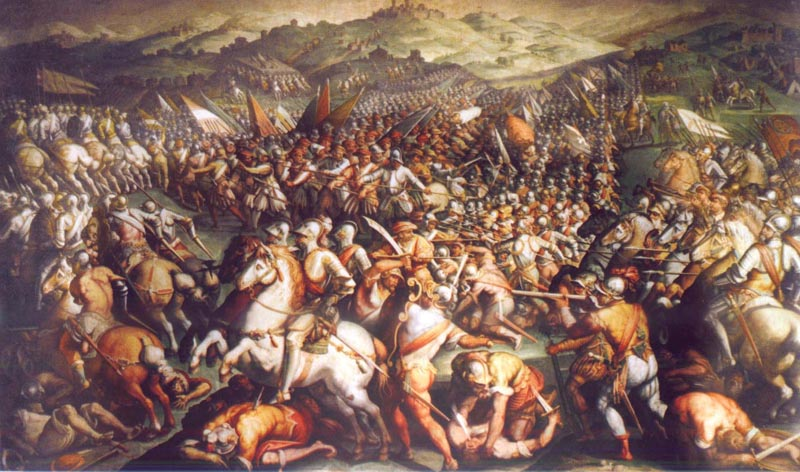
August 2: The battle of Marciano takes place in Tuscany.

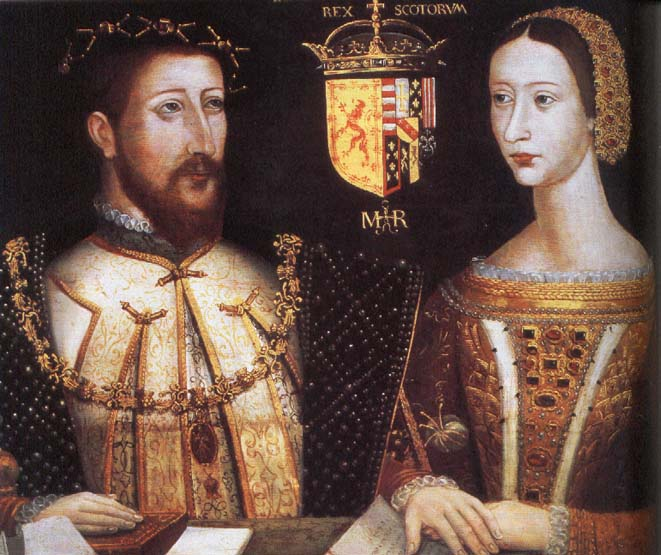
April 12: Mary of Guise becomes regent of Scotland until her daughter Mary comes of age.

Year 1554 (MDLIV) was a common year starting on Monday of the Julian calendar.

== Events ==
=== January–March ===
- January 5 – A great fire breaks out in Eindhoven, Netherlands.
- January 12 (10th waxing of Tabodwe 915 ME) – Bayinnaung is crowned king of the Burmese Taungoo Dynasty at his new capital at Pegu, after a previous coronation on January 11, 1551, and takes the regnal name of Thiri Thudhamma Yaza.
- January 21 – Edward Courtenay, one of the four plotters of Wyatt's rebellion in England, is arrested and reveals that an attempt will be made to overthrow the English government.
- January 25 – São Paulo, Brazil, is founded.
- January 27 – Wyatt's rebellion begins in England at Maidstone as Sir Thomas Wyatt reads a proclamation that Queen Mary of England’s marriage to King Philip of Spain will "bring upon this realm most miserable servitude, and establish popish religion". Within two days, Wyatt has raised 2,000 soldiers to join his plan to overthrow Queen Mary.
- January 30 – Henry Grey, Duke of Suffolk, one of the English conspirators in Wyatt's rebellion, leads troops from Leicester to Coventry, but the group finds that the gates of the city are closed because the rebellion has been exposed.
- February 9 – Thomas Wyatt surrenders to government forces in London.
- February 12 – After claiming the throne of England the previous year, Lady Jane Grey is beheaded for treason.
- March 18 – Princess Elizabeth is imprisoned in the Tower of London on charges of working with the organizers of Wyatt's rebellion for the overthrow of Queen Mary of England.

=== April–June ===
- April 12 – Mary of Guise becomes Regent of Scotland.
- May 9 – Elizabeth is released from the Tower of London, although she continues to be confined at home after she is cleared of suspicion of conspiracy to overthrow the government.
- June 11
  - Italian General Piero Strozzi successfully defends an attack on the Republic of Siena by French troops, led by Cosimo de' Medici at the battle of Pontedera, but suffers a tremendous loss of his own troops in the process.
  - A gunpowder explosion triggered by lightning causes fires that destroy much of the city of Luxembourg.

=== July–September ===
- July 25– Queen Mary I of England marries King Prince Philip of Naples, the only son of Charles V, Holy Roman Emperor and heir to the throne of Spain, at Winchester Cathedral just two days after their first meeting.
- August 2 – Battle of Marciano: Senese–French forces are defeated by the Florentine–Imperial army.
- August 12 – Battle of Renty: French forces led by François, Duke of Guise turn back an invasion of Picardy, by Charles V.
- September 13 (Shawwal 15, 961 AH) – At the Battle of Tadla in Morocco, Mohammed ash-Sheikh, ruler of the Saadi dynasty enters the city of Fez and becomes the undisputed sultan. Ali Abu Hassun, last ruler of the Wattasid dynasty, flees.

=== October–December ===
- October 8 – In Peru, an 11-month long rebellion by Francisco Hernández Girón is ended at the Battle of Pucará with the rebels defeated by the Viceroy of Peru near Cuzco.
- October 21 – The Plassenburg castle in Bavaria, residence of the ruling House of Hohenzollern in the Principality of Ansbach, is destroyed during the Second Margrave War.
- November 1 – English captain John Lok, commanding three ships (the Trinitie, the Bartholomew and the John Evangelist), departs from Dartmouth in England to voyage to the Guinea Coast at West Africa.
- November 22 – Upon the death of his father, Sultan Islam Shah Suri, 12-year-old Firuz Shah Suri becomes the Sultan of the Sur Empire at Delhi, but he is murdered within a few days.
- December 22 – The John Lok expedition reaches Guinea, anchoring at the Sesto River and remains for seven days to begin trading."

=== Date unknown ===
- Mikael Agricola becomes the bishop of Turku.
- Saadi conquers the Kingdom of Fez.
- Exact center year of Counter Reformation.
- The name of the beer brewed by New Belgium Brewing Company is based on a recipe from this date, called "1554."
- Luso-Chinese agreement: Portugal reaches an agreement with the Ming Dynasty of China, to be allowed to legally trade in the province of Guangdong. This agreement is often seen as a starting point of the Portuguese colony of Macau.
- Rao Surjan Singh becomes ruler of Bundi.

== Births ==
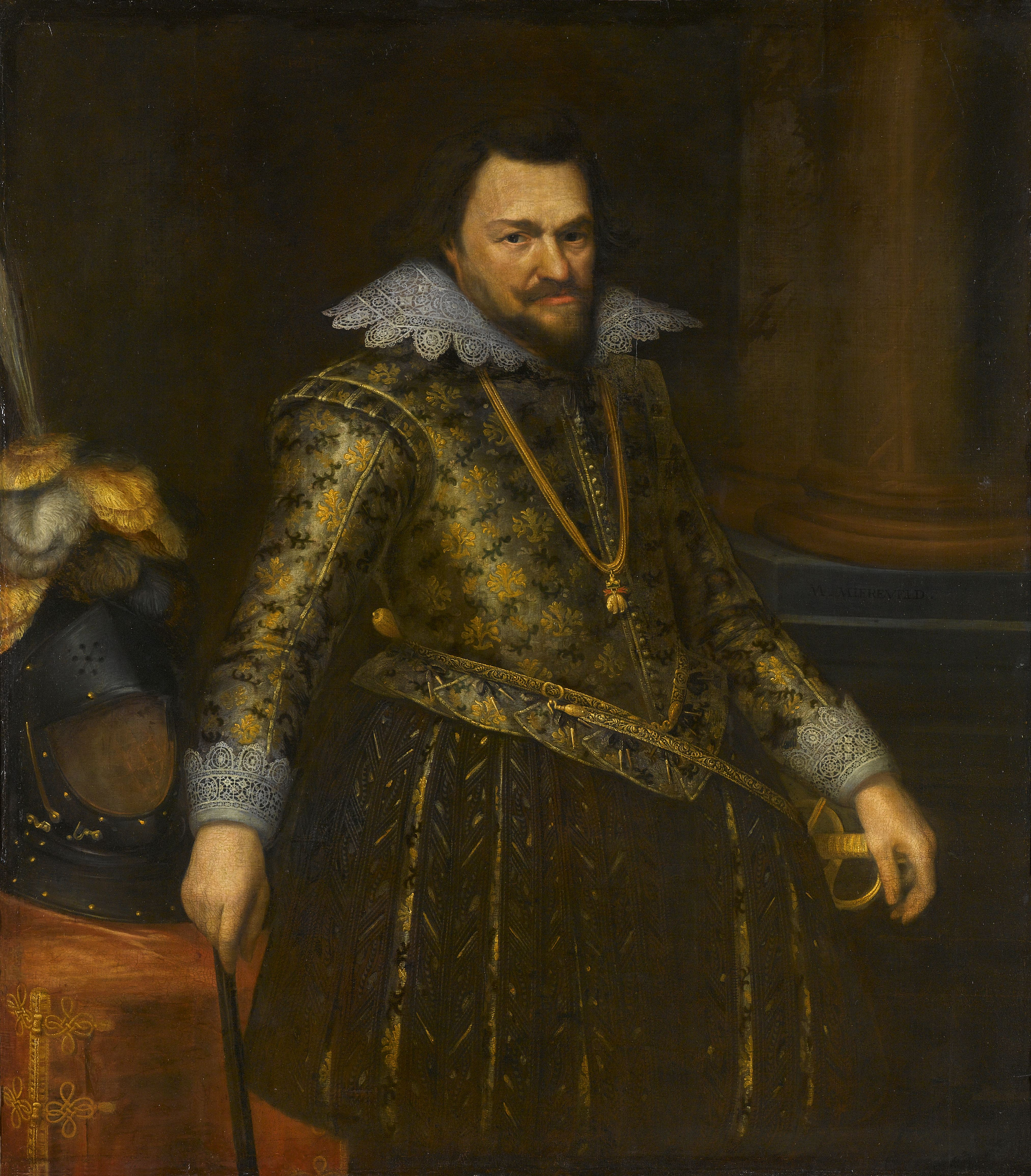
Philip William, Prince of Orange

- January 1 – Louis III, Duke of Württemberg (d. 1593)
- January 9 – Pope Gregory XV (d. 1623)
- January 20 – Sebastian, King of Portugal (d. 1578)
- February 8 – Marina de Escobar, Spanish nun (d. 1633)
- February 27 – Giovanni Battista Paggi, Italian painter (d. 1627)
- March – Richard Hooker, Anglican theologian (d. 1600)
- March 1 – William Stafford, English courtier and conspirator (d. 1612)
- March 18 – Josias I, Count of Waldeck-Eisenberg, Count of Waldeck-Eisenberg (1578-1588) (d. 1588)
- March 22 – Catherine de Parthenay, French noblewoman and mathematician (d. 1631)
- March 26 – Charles of Lorraine, Duke of Mayenne, French military leader (d. 1611)
- March 28 – Tsarevich Ivan Ivanovich of Russia (d. 1581)
- March 30 – Paul Laurentius, German divine (d. 1624)
- April – Stephen Gosson, English satirist (d. 1624)
- April 15 – Simon VI, Count of Lippe, Count of Lippe-Detmold (1563-1613) (d. 1613)
- May 20 – Paolo Bellasio, Italian composer (d. 1594)
- June 3 – Pietro de' Medici, Italian noble (d. 1604)
- June 5 – Benedetto Giustiniani, Italian Catholic cardinal (d. 1621)
- June 21 – Joachim of Zollern, Titular Count of Hohenzollern (d. 1587)
- July 5 – Elisabeth of Austria, Queen of France (d. 1592)
- October 1 – Leonardus Lessius, Jesuit theologian (d. 1623)
- October 3 – Fulke Greville, 1st Baron Brooke, English poet (d. 1628)
- October 10 – Arnold III, Count of Bentheim-Steinfurt-Tecklenburg-Limburg and Lord of Rheda (d. 1606)
- October 20 – Bálint Balassi, Hungarian writer and noble (d. 1594)
- October 28 – Enevold Kruse, Danish noble (d. 1621)
- October 30 – Prospero Farinacci, Italian jurist (d. 1618)
- November 30 – Sir Philip Sidney, English courtier and poet (d. 1586)
- December 17 – Ernest of Bavaria, Roman Catholic bishop (d. 1612)
- December 19 – Philip William, Prince of Orange (d. 1618)
- date unknown
  - Jacques Bongars, French scholar and diplomat (d. 1612)
  - James Lancaster, English navigator (d. 1618)
  - Walter Raleigh, English writer, poet, and explorer (d. 1618)
  - Francis Throckmorton, English conspirator (d. 1584)

== Deaths ==
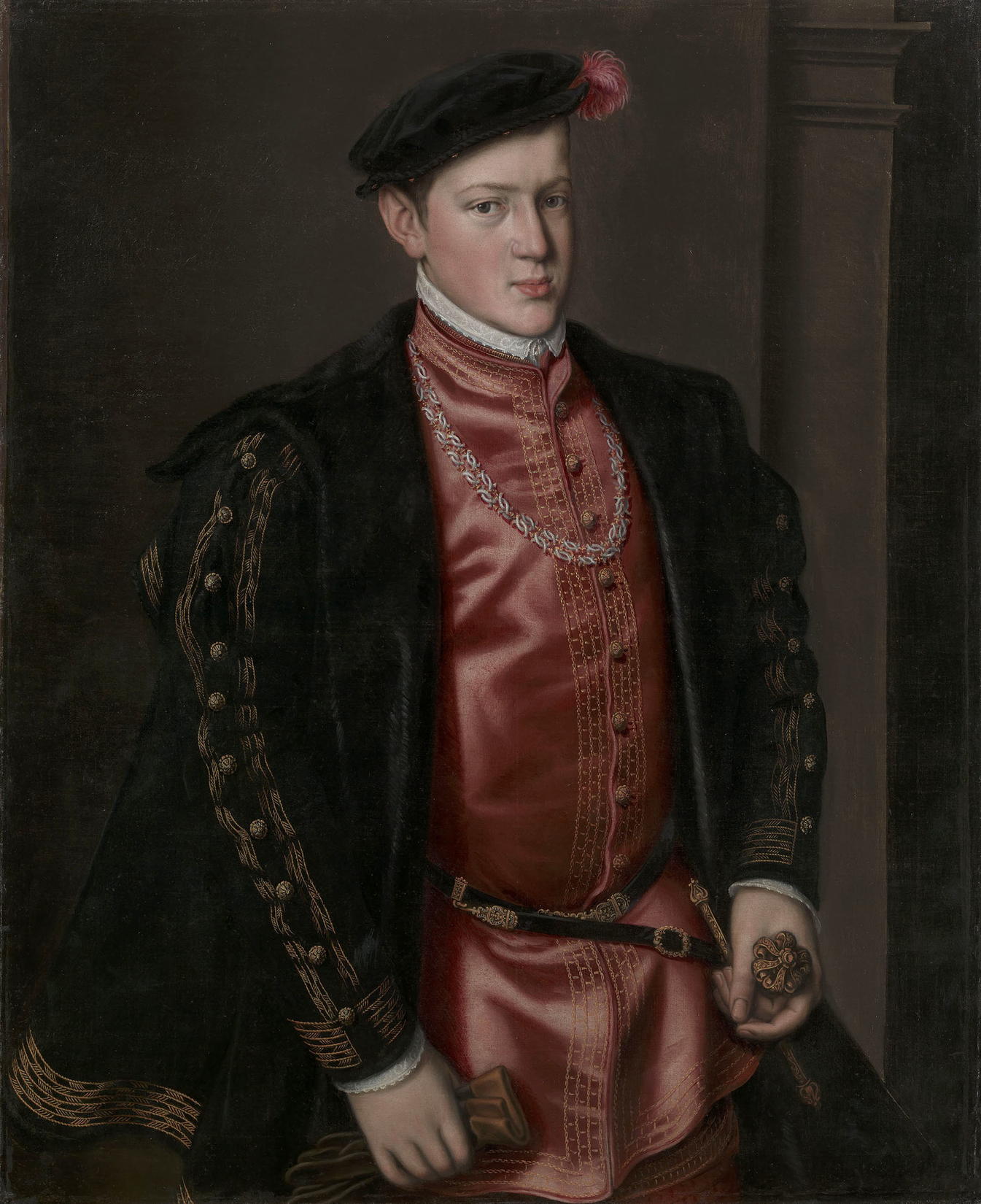
- João Manuel, Prince of Portugal
  January 2 – João Manuel, Prince of Portugal, Portuguese prince (b. 1537)
- January 11 – Min Bin, king of Arakan (b. 1493)
- January 16
  - Christiern Pedersen, Danish humanist (b. c. 1480)
  - Ambrosius Moibanus, German theologian (b. 1494)
- January 23
  - Elizabeth Hussey, Baroness Hungerford, English noblewoman (b. 1510)
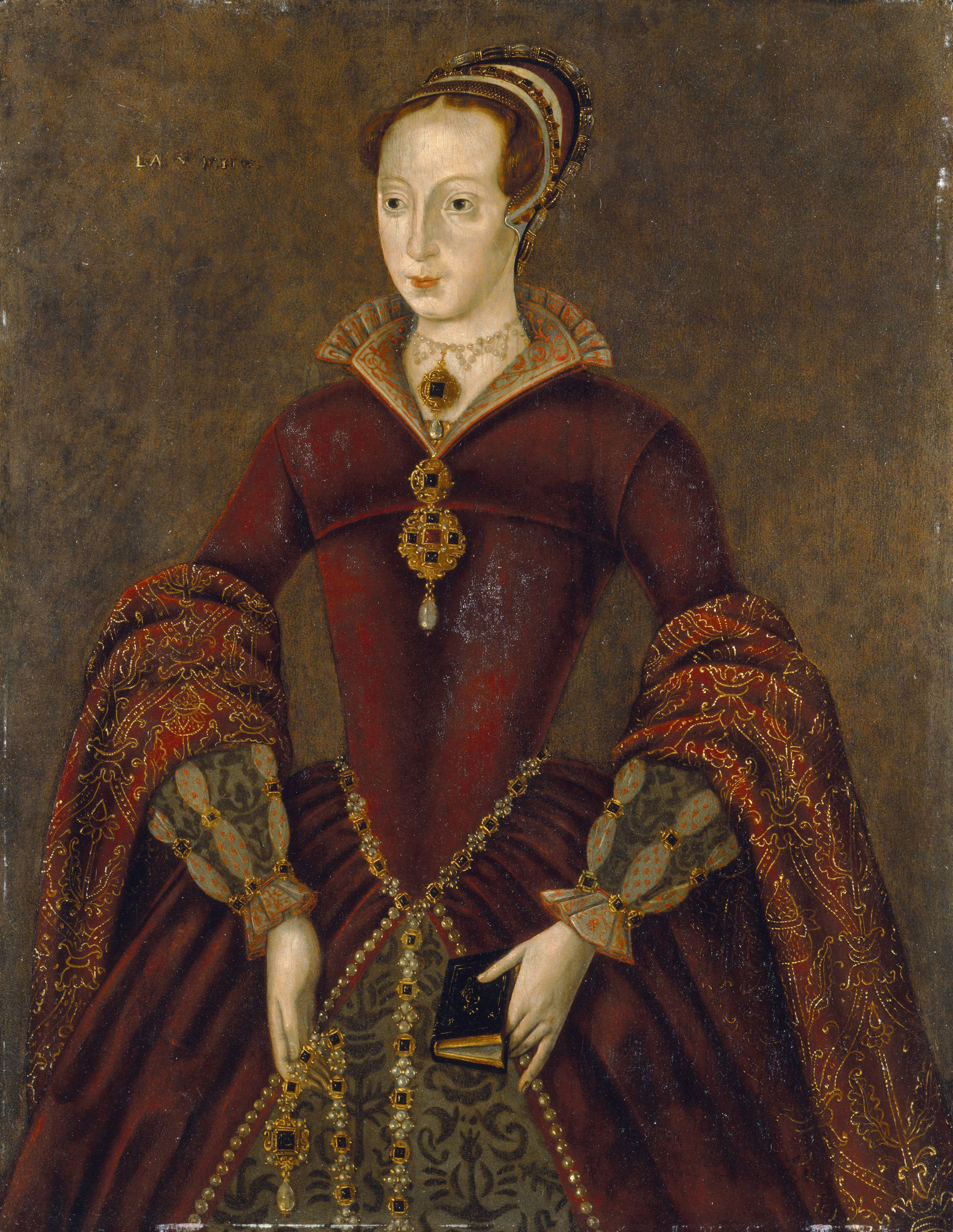
- Lady Jane Grey
  February 12
  - Lord Guildford Dudley, consort of Lady Jane Grey (executed) (b. 1536)
  - Lady Jane Grey, claimant to the throne of England (executed) (b. 1537)
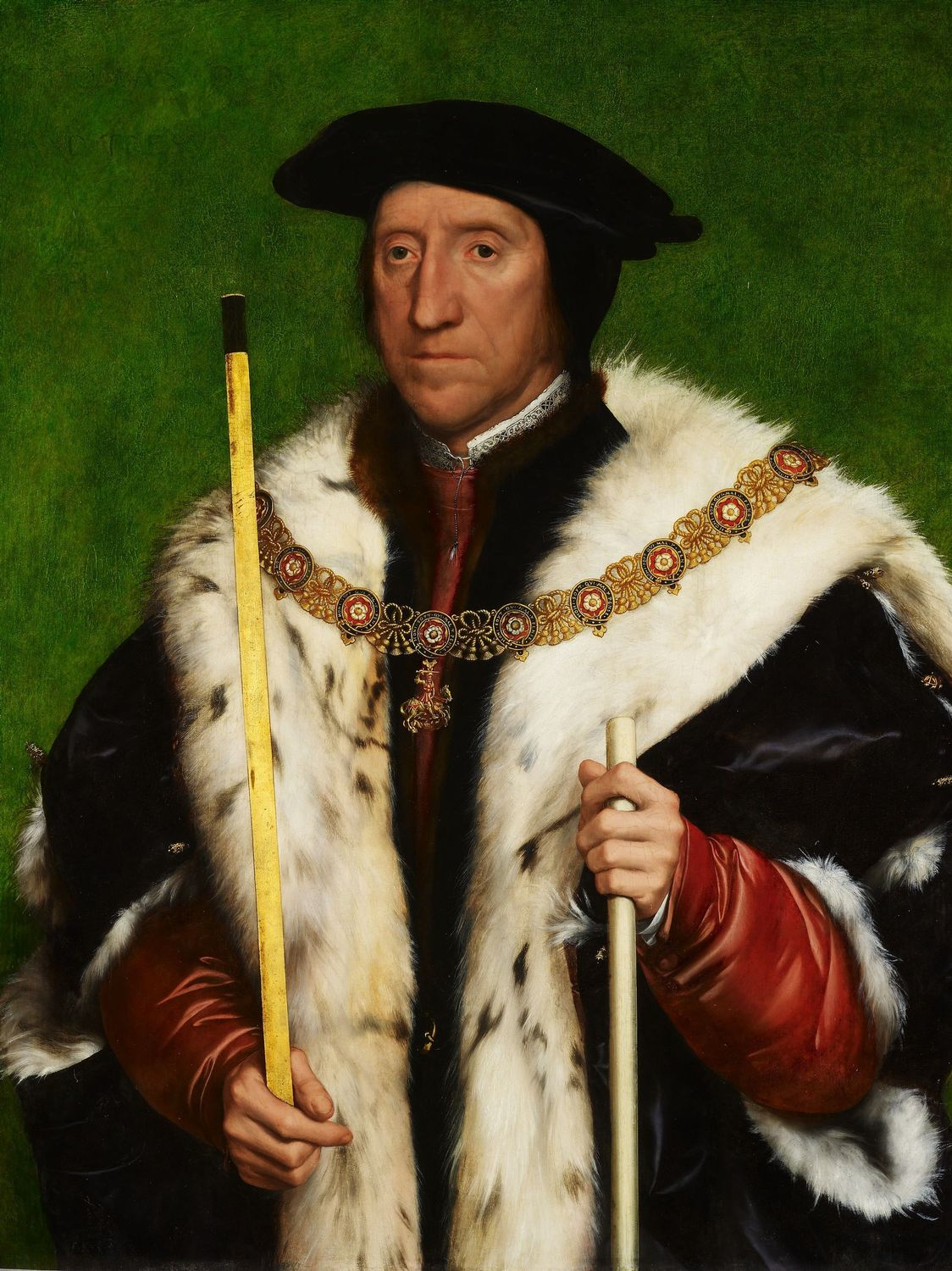
- Thomas Howard, 3rd Duke of Norfolk
  February 21
  - Hieronymus Bock, German botanist (b. 1498)
  - Sibylle of Cleves, Electress consort of Saxony (b. 1512)
- February 23 – Henry Grey, Duke of Suffolk, English politician (executed) (b. c.1517)
- March 3 – John Frederick I, Elector of Saxony (b. 1503)
- April 11 – Thomas Wyatt the Younger, English rebel (executed) (b. 1521)
- April 23 – Gaspara Stampa, Italian poet (b. 1523)
- May 2 – William Waldegrave, English Member of Parliament (b. 1507)
- June 19
  - Sixt Birck, German humanist (b. 1501)
  - Philip II, Count of Nassau-Saarbrücken, German noble (b. 1509)
- June 28 – Leone Strozzi, French Navy admiral (b. 1515)
- August 25 – Thomas Howard, 3rd Duke of Norfolk, English politician (b. 1473)
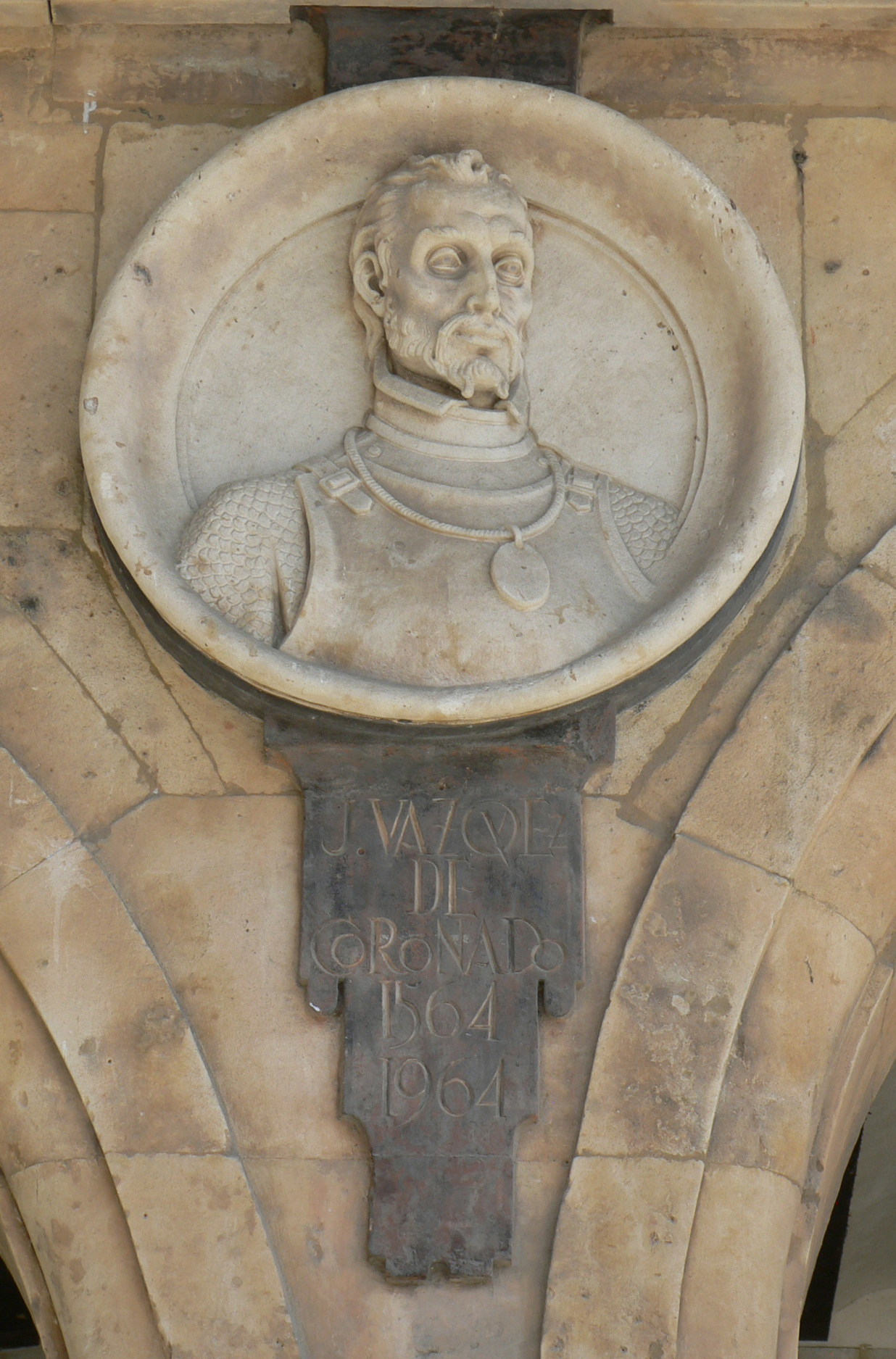
  Francisco Vázquez de Coronado
- September 22 – Francisco Vázquez de Coronado, Spanish conquistador (b. c. 1510)
- December 22 – Alessandro Bonvicino, Italian painter (b. 1498)
- December – John Taylor, Bishop of Lincoln (b. 1503)
- approx. date – Susannah Hornebolt, English artist (b. 1503)
- date unknown
  - Argula von Grumbach, German Protestant reformer (b. 1492)
  - Leo Africanus, Andalusian Berber writer (b. 1485)
  - Sebastiano Serlio, Italian architect (b. 1475)
  - Sir Hugh Willoughby, English Arctic explorer
