= Place d'Armes (Luxembourg) =

Square in Luxembourg City

Coordinates: 49°36′40″N 06°07′44″E

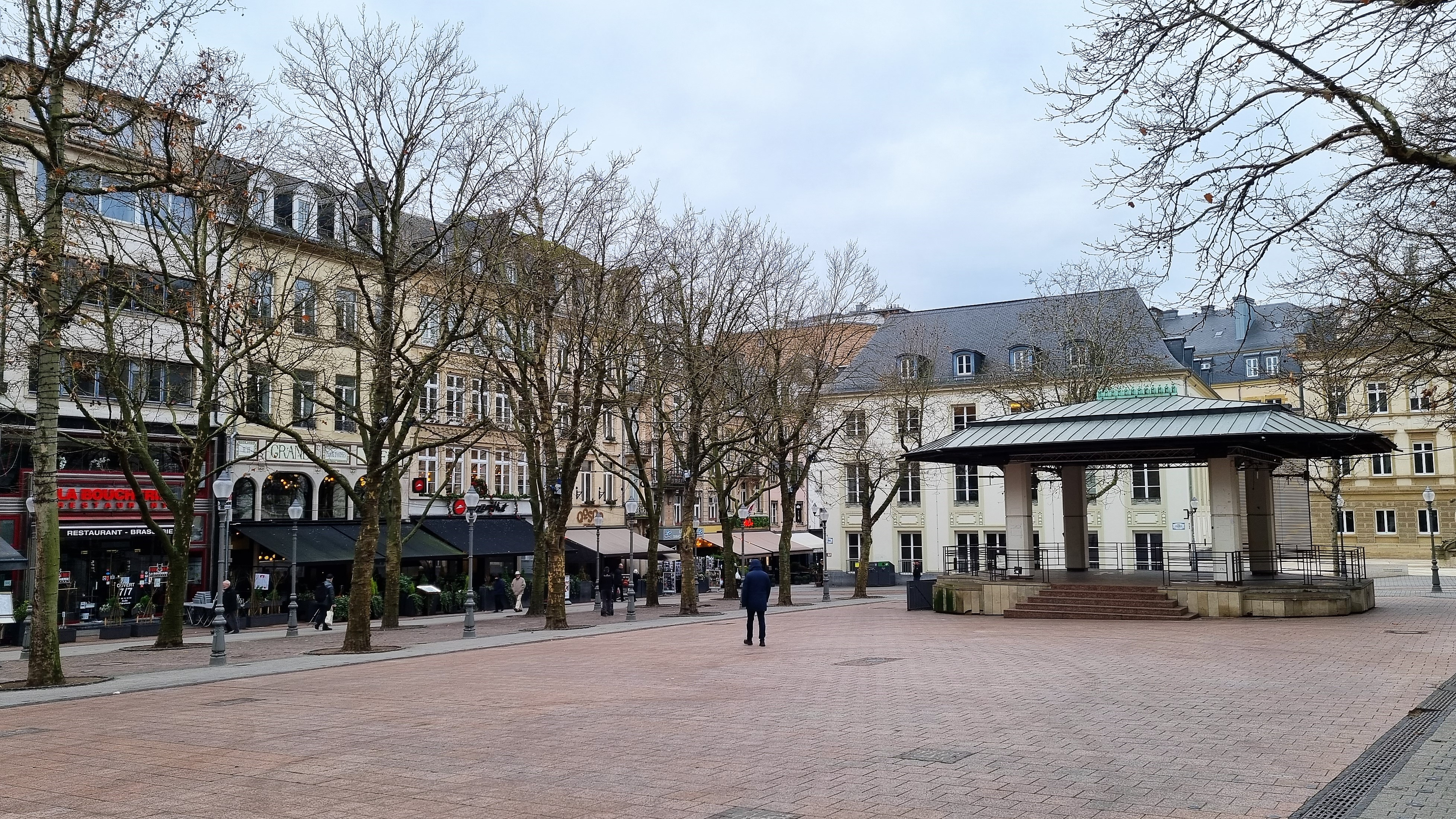
The Place d'Armes in winter

The Place d'Armes (Luxembourgish: Plëss d'Arem, or simply Plëss) is a square in Luxembourg City, the capital of Luxembourg. Centrally placed in the old town, it attracts large numbers of locals and visitors, especially in the summer months. It originally served as a parade ground for the troops defending the city.

== History ==
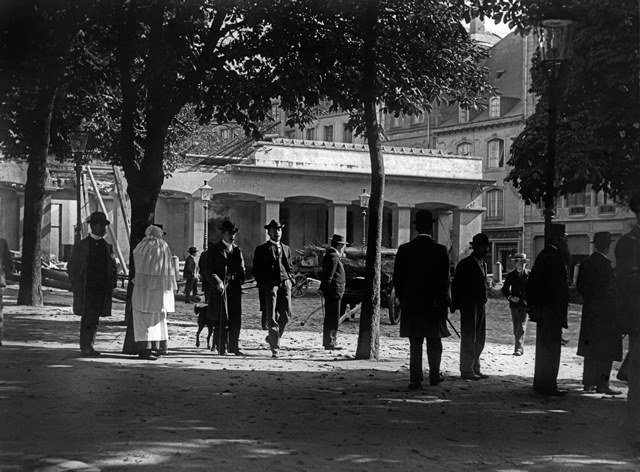
Demolition of the former Prussian guardhouse in 1903

In 1554, a gunpowder explosion in the church of the city's Franciscan convent caused fires that destroyed a large part of the Ville Haute. Martin van Rossem, the acting Governor of Luxembourg, tasked Dutch military engineer Sebastian van Noyen with establishing a reconstruction plan. In 1561, Thomas Mameranus, brother of humanist historian Nicolaus Mameranus, submitted an evolved version of van Noyen's plan; it included, at the centre of a somewhat grid-like street network, a Forum Novum 96 meters in length and 64 meters in width, which was about the size of Brussels' Grand-Place at the time.

In 1671, the Spanish engineer Jean Charles de Landas, Count of Louvigny, produced a slightly smaller square at the same location. It became known as the Place d'Armes as it was used as a parade ground for the garrison. Under Louis XIV, it was paved with flagstones and bordered with lime trees.

== The Place d’Armes today ==
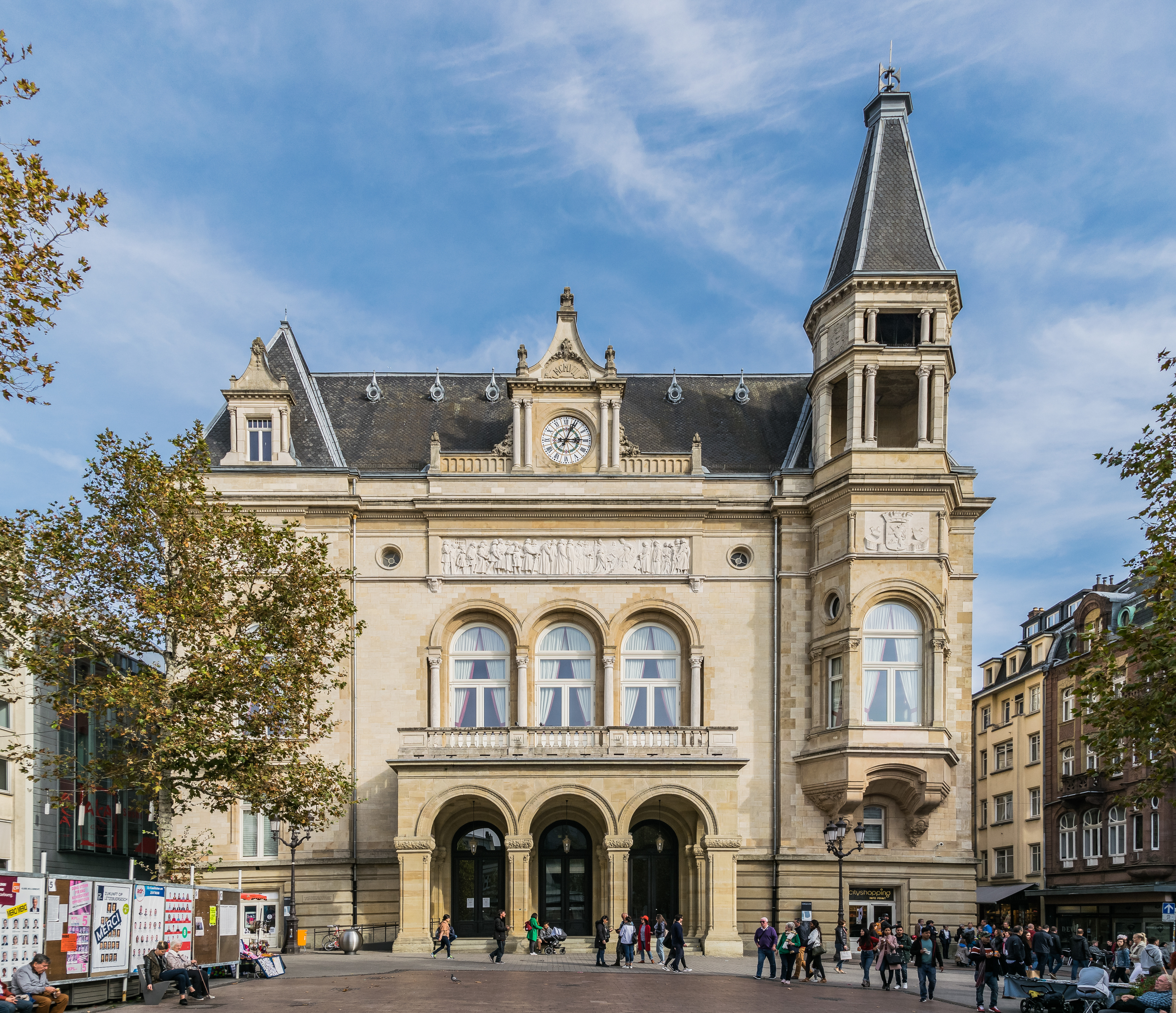
Cercle Municipal

Now an integral part of the pedestrian zone, the square is surrounded by numerous cafés and restaurants, all with pavement terraces in the summer months. It has become the city's main centre of activity, attracting locals and visitors of all ages. Visiting bands and music groups present concerts from the central bandstand every summer evening. Every second and fourth Saturday, there is a flea market and in December the Christmas market with several square houses .

== Cercle Municipal ==
The Palais Municipal, generally known as Cercle Municipal or Cercle Cité, stands at the eastern end of the square. It was originally designed as an administrative building with reception rooms. The main structure was completed in 1906 but work on the interior took until 1909.

On the facade, there is a frieze by Luxembourgish artist P. Federspiel of Countess Ermesinde granting the Charter of Emancipation in 1244 which guaranteed the citizens rights and duties towards the nobility.

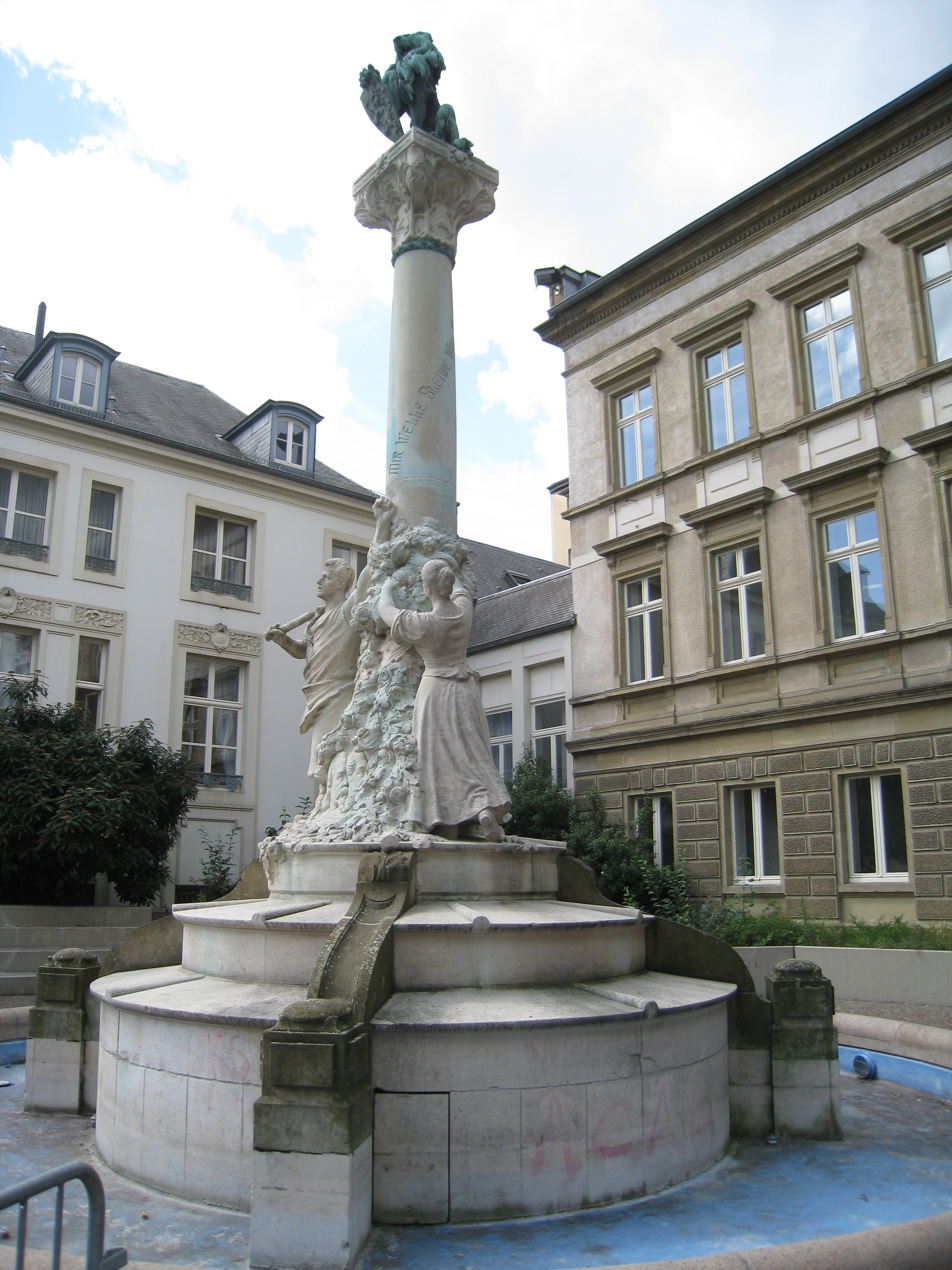
Dicks-Lentz monument

After a period when it was used for the European Court of Justice the Palais Municipal has, since 1969, served as a venue for celebrations and cultural events.

A plaque on the Cercle Municipal records the liberation of Luxembourg during the Second World War. It reads:

On this square, on 10th September 1944 the people of Luxembourg warmly welcomed its liberators, the valiant soldiers of the US 5th Armored Division and their royal highnesses Prince Felix of Luxembourg and Prince John, hereditary grand duke of Luxembourg.

== Dicks-Lentz monument ==
In a part of the Place d'Armes that was renamed Square Jan-Palach in 1969, there is a monument by Pierre Federspiel celebrating Luxembourg's two national poets, Dicks (1823–1891) and Michel Lentz (1820–1893), who wrote the words of the national anthem. The lion at the top of the monument represents the Grand Duchy, while the blacksmith symbolizes the steel industry. The inscription on the pillar: Mir wëlle bleiwe wat mir sin (We want to stay what we are) is the motto of the Luxembourgers.

== See also ==
- Place Guillaume II

== Gallery ==
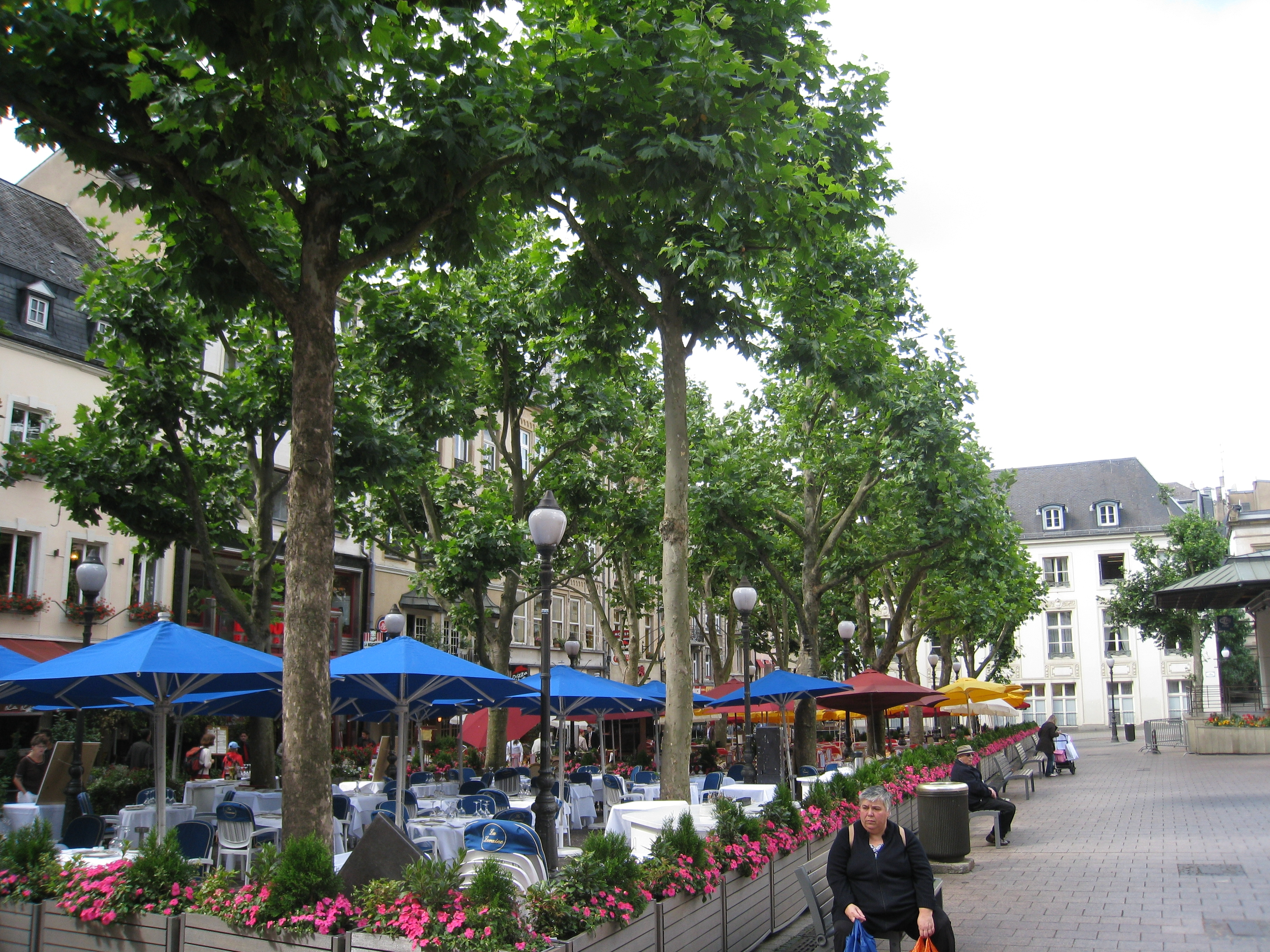
Terraces: Place d'Armes

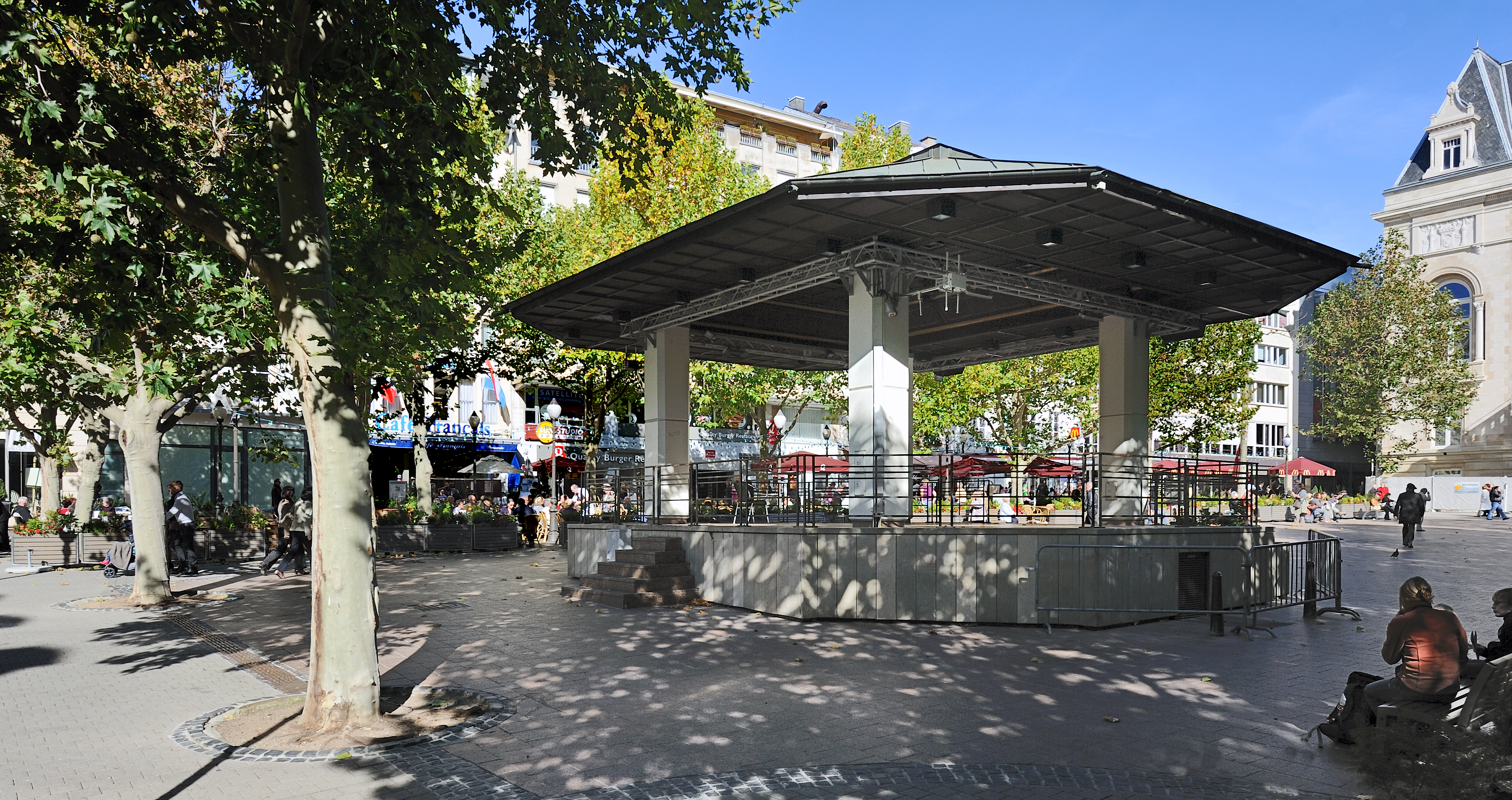
The Place d'Armes bandstand

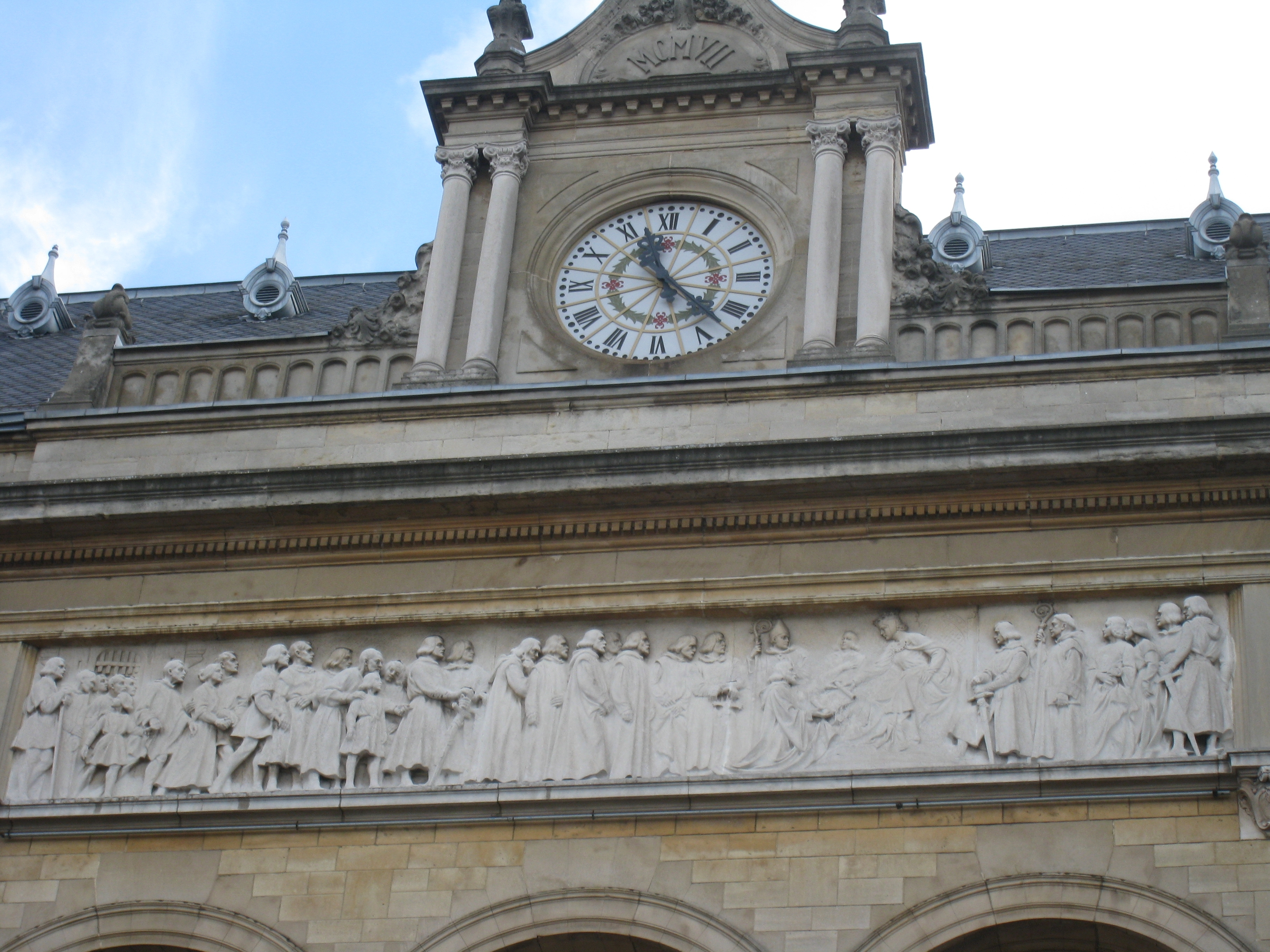
Frieze showing Ermesinde granting the Charter of Emancipation

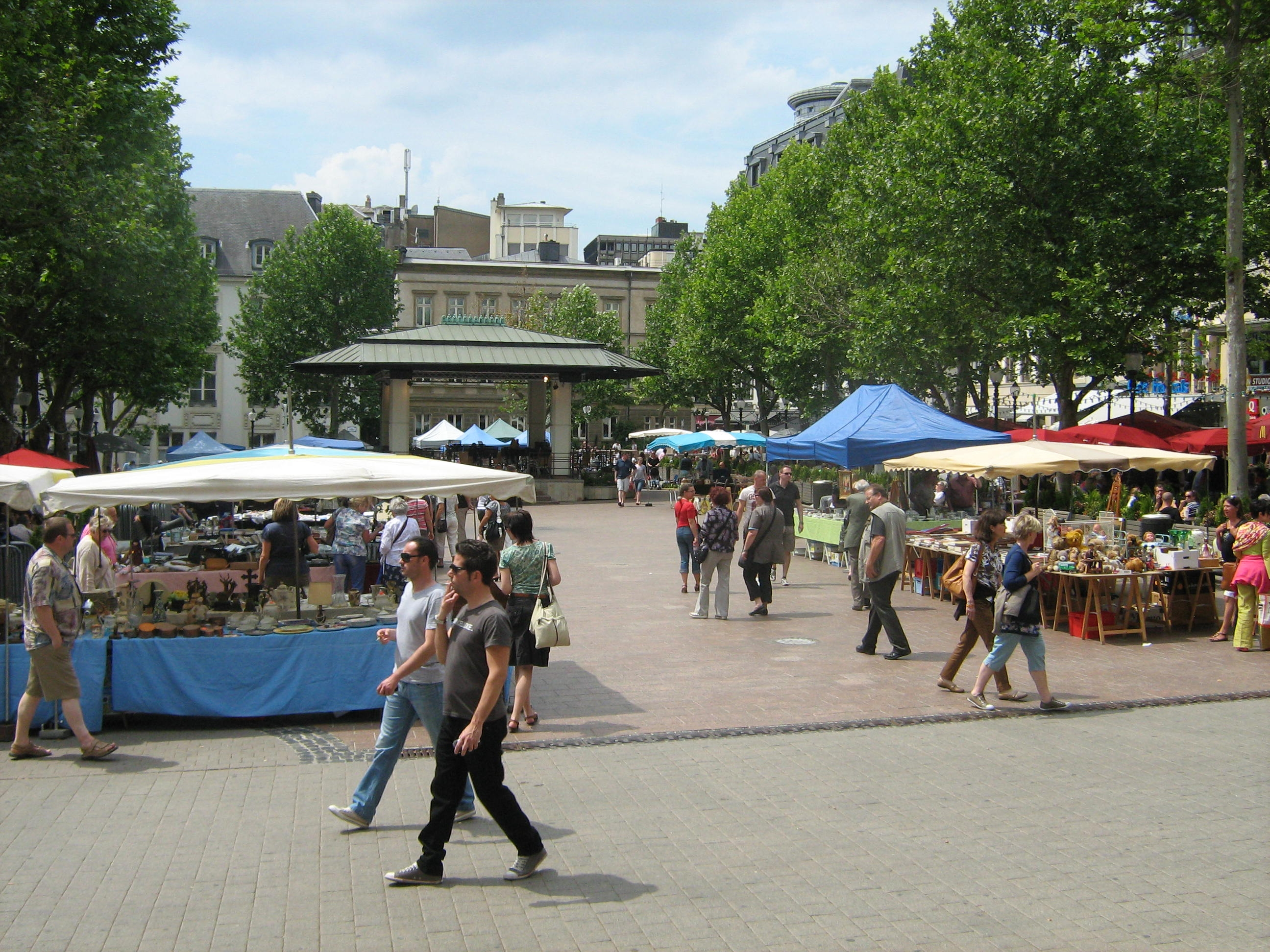
Summer flea market (June 2011)

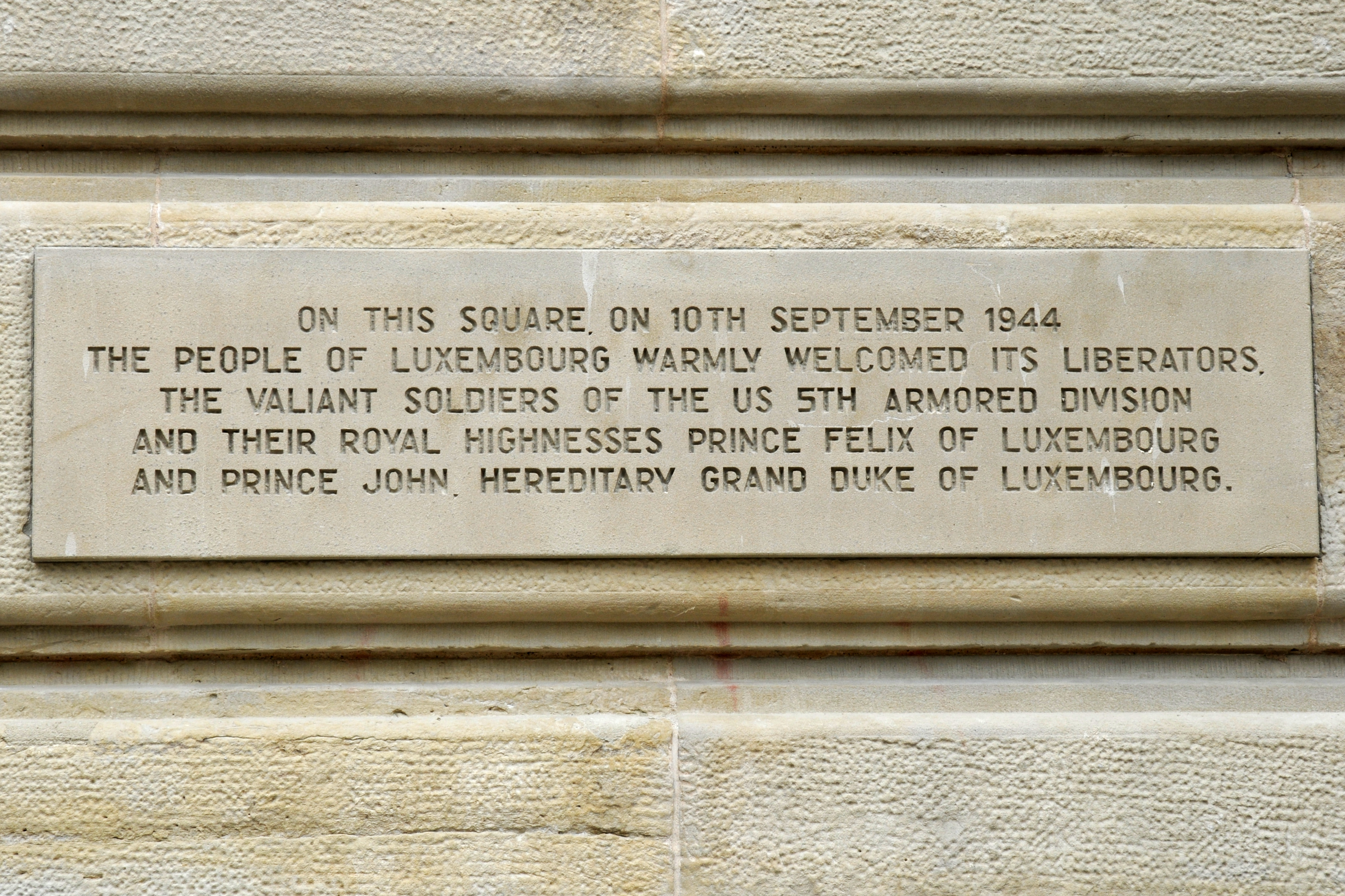
Plaque on the Cercle Cité
