= 1554 Luxembourg explosion =

1554 gunpowder explosion in Luxembourg

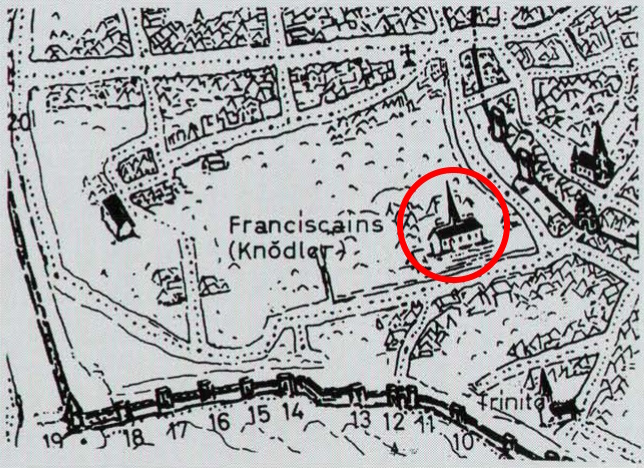
- Detail of van Deventer's 1550 map of Luxembourg, with the Franciscan convent circled in red
- Date: 11 June 1554
- Location: Franciscan convent, Luxembourg; 49°36′37″N 6°7′54″E
- Cause: Lightning striking barrels of gunpowder
- Deaths: 2+
- Injuries: Unknown
- Property damage: Large part of the city of Luxembourg destroyed by the ensuing fires

On 11 June 1554, lightning struck the church of a Franciscan convent in the city of Luxembourg, triggering the explosion of the gunpowder barrels stored in the church attic at the time. The flaming pieces of the church's roof were scattered, spreading fires around the city and destroying a large part of it, including the city hall and Franciscan convent. Apart from two monks that were known to be in the church at the time of the explosion, the number of victims is unknown.

In the aftermath of the explosion, Dutch military engineer Sebastiaan van Noyen was tasked with establishing a reconstruction plan. While most of his suggestions failed to be implemented in the following decades due to the reluctance of citizens, his proposal of a central square known as the forum novum was eventually adapted into a smaller version, the Place d'Armes, inaugurated in 1671. The city hall was rebuilt in 1572, later becoming the modern-day Grand Ducal Palace.

== Background ==
The city of Luxembourg began to grow in the late 10th century around a castle on the Bock, a promontory acquired by Count Siegfried in 963, and the adjacent Fish Market. It slowly expanded in the following centuries, reaching an area of about 5 hectares (12 acres) by the mid-13th Century, when it was granted its city charter by Countess Ermesinde. It was around this time that Franciscan monks, likely originating from Trier, settled in Luxembourg, establishing a convent just outside of what were the city limits at the time on the site of the modern-day Place Guillaume II. (Note: Known in Luxembourgish as the Knuedler, from the word Knot or Knued, referring to the large knot commonly worn by the Franciscans around their waists.) At its peak, the convent occupied an area of up to 3 hectares (7.4 acres), including a church 50 metres (160 ft) in length with five altars, and a cemetery where the city's less wealthy residents were buried. All the while, the city further grew within an outer wall that began construction under Count John the Blind, reaching by 1398 an area of about 23 hectares (57 acres), its definitive size until the 19th century.

Meanwhile, the city gained prominence as a fortress with defensive works continuously expanded over the centuries; by 1554, after changing hands several times, it was occupied by troops of the Holy Roman Empire under Charles V. Gunpowder had been used since the second half of the 15th century, leading to profound architectural transformations of the fortress. The city's habitual gunpowder magazine was the Bastion Marie; however, due to repeated explosions during construction work, the barrels of gunpowder were eventually moved to the attic of the Franciscan convent's church as a temporary safety measure.

== Explosion and fires ==
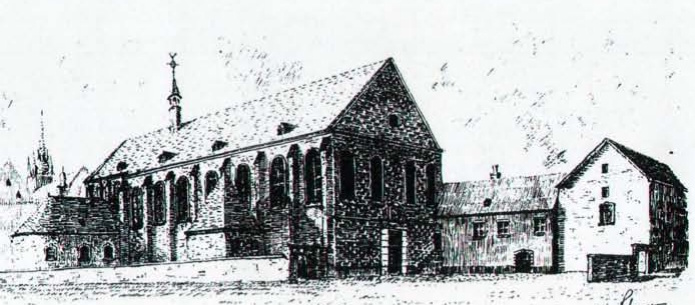
A later iteration of the convent, depicted around 1801

On 11 June 1554, as a violent storm brewed over the city of Luxembourg, lightning struck the church of the Franciscan convent, causing the explosion of the gunpowder barrels. The explosion blew the church's roof off, creating flaming projectiles that were scattered over a wide radius, landing on a number of houses. As roofs of the time were typically thatched or shingled, the ensuing fires spread rapidly. Firefighting would have been complicated by the fact that the upper town lacked water sources, and had to rely instead on water carriers walking up from the Alzette valley. Some half-timbered houses in the church's vicinity were immediately destroyed, collapsing due to the shockwaves that the explosion had caused.

The fires lasted several hours, possibly being extinguished by rainfall. By then, a large part of the city had been destroyed, including the entire southern side of the Acht street (now known as the Grand-rue). Both the convent and the city hall, which had been built in the early 15th century, were completely destroyed, adding to the wartime destruction of other medieval buildings in previous years, notably Bock castle, Münster Abbey and the Dominican convent. A large number of documents, including the city's accounts, were lost in the fire. However, the 12th-century Saint Nicholas' Church, located on the current site of the Chamber of Deputies and which would be demolished in 1779, was spared thanks to the direction of the wind. The number of victims of the catastrophe is unknown, apart from two Franciscan monks who were alone in the church during the explosion, implying that they both died.

== Reconstruction ==
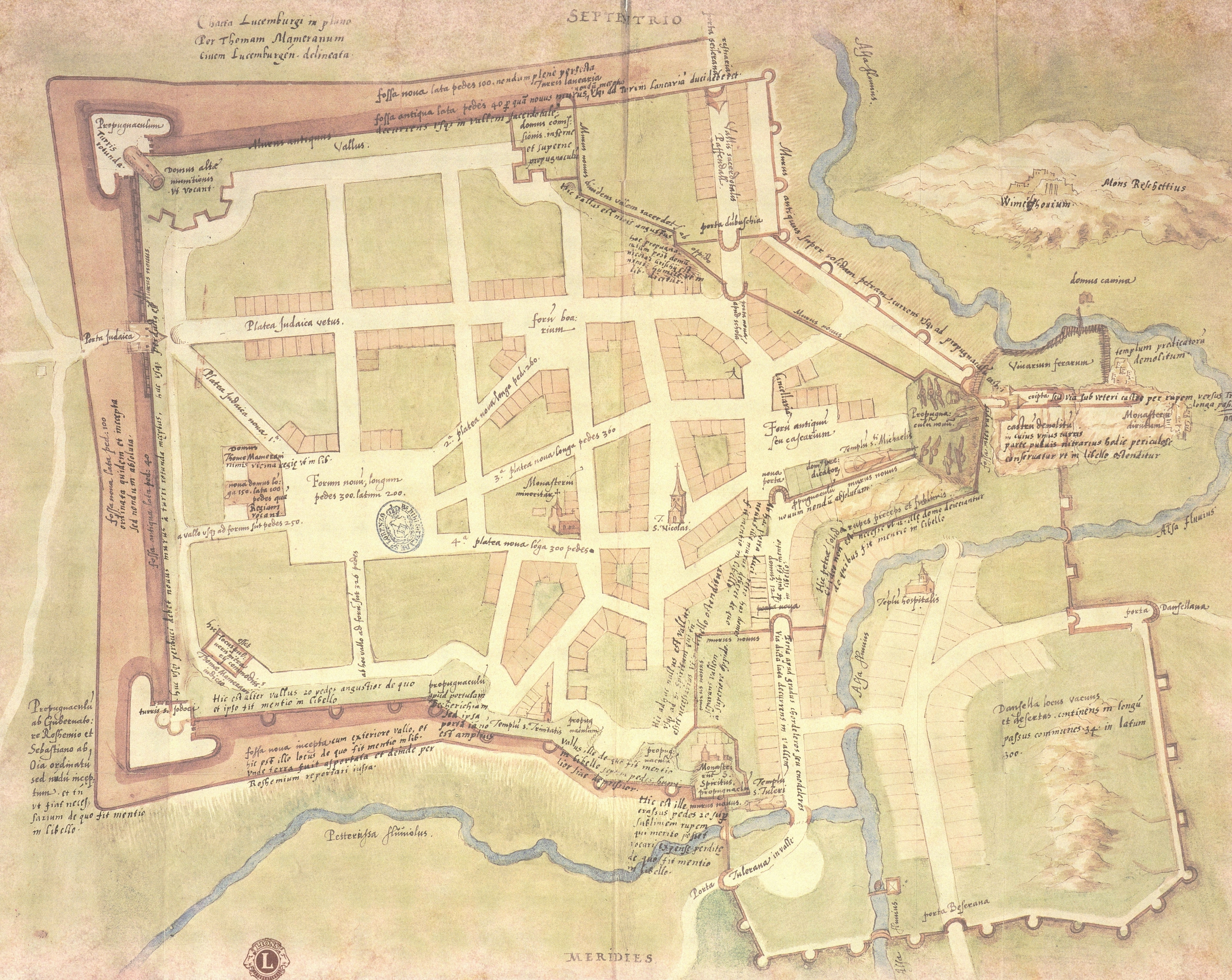
Mameranus' 1561 plan, showing new streets radiating out of the proposed forum novum

On 14 September, Mary of Austria, Governor of the Habsburg Netherlands, granted the city tax relief; all citizens who had lost their houses in the fire were to be exempt from taxation for 20 years, on the condition that they rebuilt them within 6 years. Furthermore, public funds would pay for half of the roofing costs, with those new roofs having to be built of slate.

On 28 November, with the hopes of avoiding an uncontrolled reconstruction, acting Governor of Luxembourg Maarten van Rossum, who had replaced Peter Ernst von Mansfeld after the latter had been made a prisoner of war in 1551, tasked Dutch military engineer Sebastiaan van Noyen with establishing a reconstruction plan for the city. Van Noyen had previously worked on Luxembourg's fortifications between February and May 1553.

While Van Noyen's plan has been lost, its ideas have survived through a dissertion written by Thomas Mameranus, brother of humanist Nicolas Mameranus, inspired by the plan and presented to King Philip II in 1561. This plan featured a number of new streets in a grid-like pattern, and, most prominently, a new central square, the forum novum ("new market"), that was originally meant to be 530 pedes in length and 330 pedes in width (170 by 105 metres (558 ft × 344 ft)) before being downsized to 400 by 270 pedes (128 by 86 metres (420 ft × 282 ft)) on Van Rossum's suggestion, and eventually down to 300 by 200 pedes (96 by 64 metres (315 ft × 210 ft)), about the same size as Brussels' Grand-Place was at the time.

Many of the transformations imagined by van Noyen failed to become a reality, or only did so much later, as citizens rebuilt their houses where they had stood before, disregarding the plan. The existing market around Saint Michael's Church was preferred over the planned forum novum; citizens built gardens and orchards on the empty terrain where the square was meant to be established, leading to King Philip II issuing a decree that delineated the square and designated it as a market. Spears with signs fixed to them were positioned to mark the square's projected corners, but these were eventually removed.

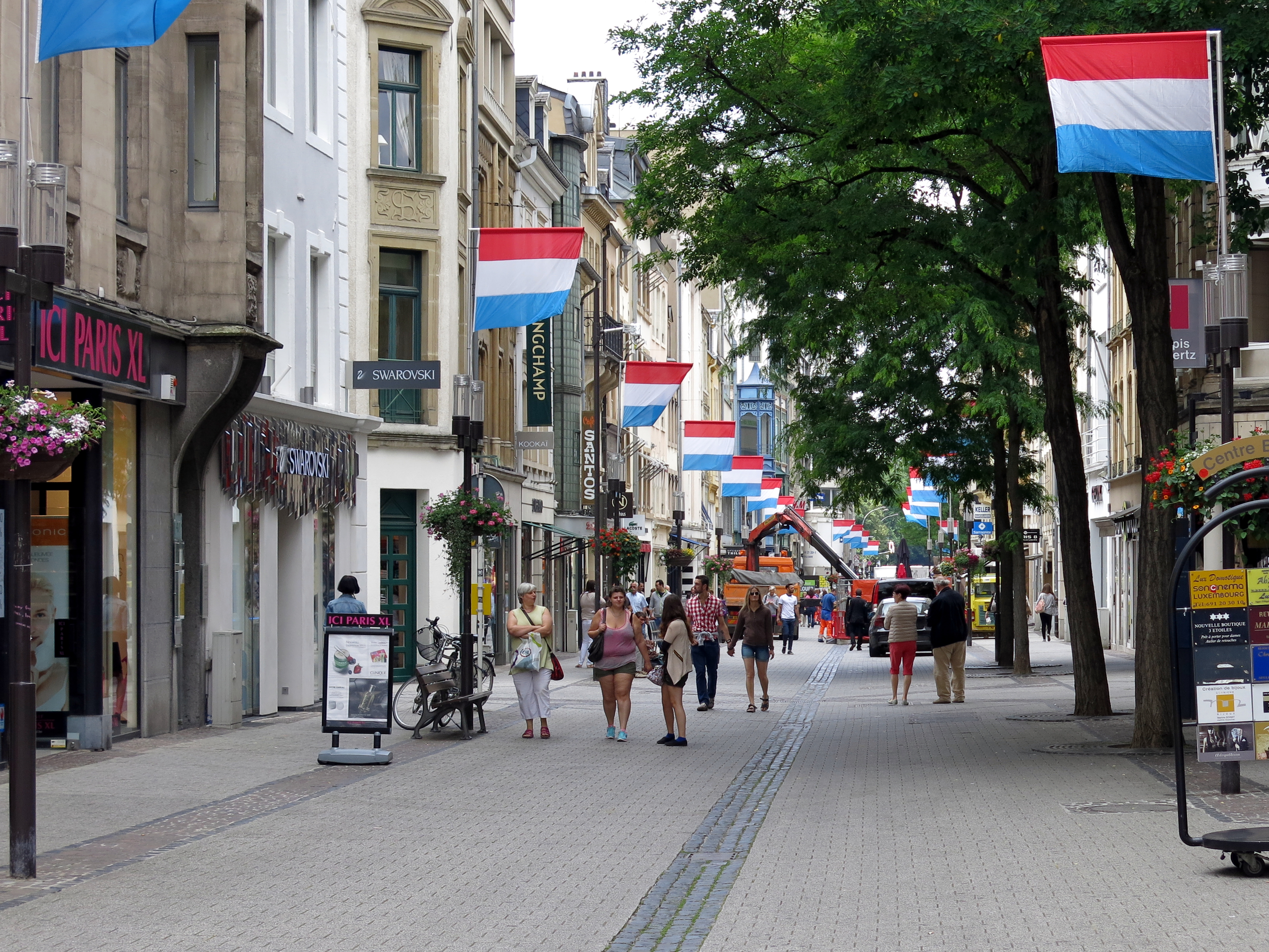
The Acht, now known as the Grand-rue, was widened on van Noyen's recommendation.

One of the few dispositions from the van Noyen plan that came to be implemented was the doubling in width of the Acht street, as the rebuilt houses on its southern side were set further back, giving it the dimensions it still has today. Within less than a year after the explosion, the Franciscans began working on the largely self-financed reconstruction of their convent's buildings. The roof of the reconstructed church was eventually destroyed by a storm in 1606, before the church was once again reconstructed from 1660 onwards. The convent was finally demolished in 1827. In 1572, after much delay in part due to lacking resources, governor Mansfeld, who had returned from his imprisonment in 1557, tasked master builder Adam Roberti with the reconstruction of City Hall, which was completed around 1573. After being significantly expanded in the 18th century, the building became the Palace of the Government, and eventually the Grand Ducal Palace.

An urbanistic transformation of central Luxembourg on the scale imagined by van Noyen only came in 1671, as the count of Monterrey, Governor of the Habsburg Netherlands, visited the city in April of that year and ordered the military engineer Louvigny to establish a new plan for its fortifications, in anticipation of a future French attack. Through an ordinance of King Charles II, nearly a hundred houses were demolished in Grund and Pfaffenthal, principally around the city gates, and the unhoused inhabitants were guaranteed relocation in the upper town. To achieve this, new streets were established: Rue Monterey, Rue Chimay and Rue Louvigny; and at the center of the city, an adapted version of the forum novum measuring 84 by 61 metres (276 ft × 200 ft), which would become known as the Place d'Armes, was created, with the whole being formally inaugurated on 10 August 1671.

== Notes and references ==
=== Works cited ===
- Lascombes, François (1976). Chronik der Stadt Luxemburg 1444–1684 [Chronicles of the city of Luxembourg 1444-1684] (in German). Luxembourg City: Éditions Saint-Paul.
- Savin, Cyrille (2007). Luxembourg, histoire et mémoire d'une ville fortifiée [Luxembourg, history and memories of a fortified city] (in French). Luxembourg City: Service des sites et monuments nationaux. ISBN 978-2-919883-36-3.
- Thewes, Guy [in Luxembourgish] (2011). "Luxembourg, ville forteresse. L'impact de la fortification sur l'organisation de l'espace urbain (XVIe-XIXe siècle)" [Luxembourg, fortress city. The impact of the fortifications on the organisation of urban sapce (16th-19th century)]. Revue belge de Philologie et d'Histoire (in French). 89 (89–2): 787–801. doi:10.3406/rbph.2011.8135. Archived from the original on 27 April 2026.
