= Rock um Knuedler =

Rock music festival

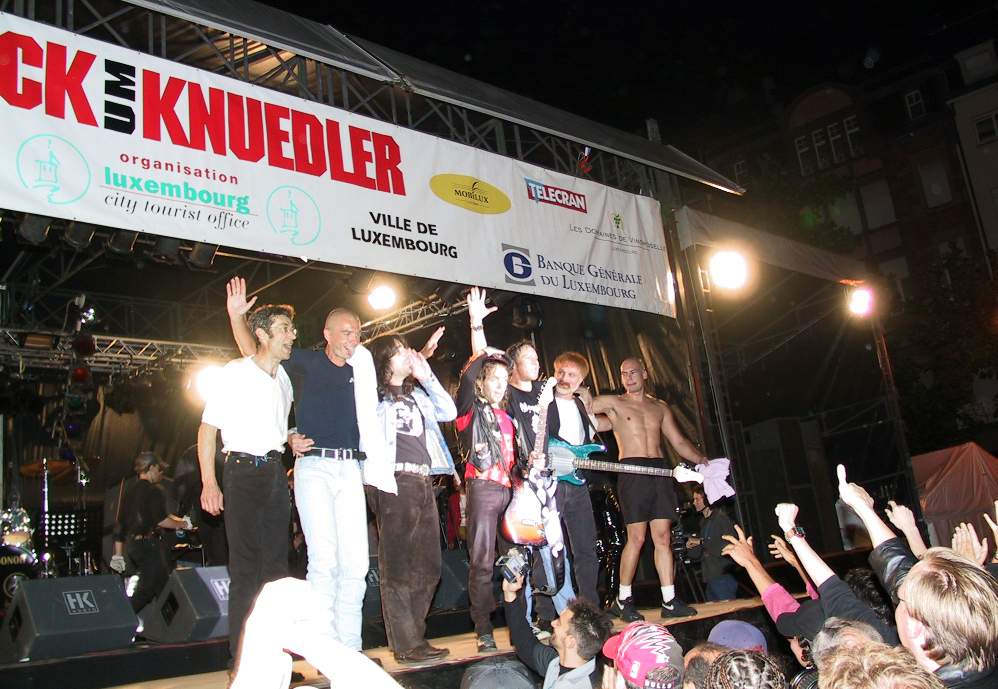
Manfred Mann's Earthband at Rock im Kneudler in 2001

Rock um Knuedler is a rock festival held every summer in the centre of Luxembourg City. Founded in 1991 when Luxembourg held the presidency of the European Union, the festival is organised by the Luxembourg City Tourist Office. It was originally designed for local groups but since 1995 it has also been a popular venue for foreign bands and artists. Performances by some 12 groups take place each year on two stages erected on Place Guillaume II, also known as Knuedler. Admission is free, attracting audiences of up to 10,000.

Recently, Rock um Knuedler has featured international groups from far afield such as Choc Quib Town (Columbia), Staff Benda Bilili (Democratic Republic of Congo) and Ben Harper and Relentless7 (USA).

== History ==
Rock um Knuedler is a rock festival held every summer in the centre of Luxembourg City. The festival is organised by the Luxembourg City Tourist Office. Founded in 1991 when Luxembourg held the presidency of the European Union, it was originally designed for local groups but since 1995 it has also been a popular venue for foreign bands and artists. Performances by some 12 groups take place each year on two stages erected on Place Guillaume II, also known as Knuedler. Admission is free, attracting audiences of up to 10,000. In its 28th year in 2019, the festival expanded beyond the original square for which it is named, holding performances on the "Holy Ghost Stage" on the rue du St. Esprit as well as at the Protestant Church on rue de la Congrégation.

Recently, Rock um Knuedler has featured international groups from far afield such as Choc Quib Town (Columbia), Staff Benda Bilili (Democratic Republic of Congo) and Ben Harper and Relentless7 (USA). Many local artists and bands also perform in a programme beginning in the morning and stretching until late in the evening. In 2020 the festival was cancelled because of the COVID-19 pandemic. Between 2019 and 2023 there was no festival held. Roby Schuler, who worked in the events department of the Luxembourg City Tourist Office until retiring in 2021, has been called the 'father of Rock um Knuedler'.
