= Cercle Municipal =

Coordinates: 49°36′41″N 06°07′47″E

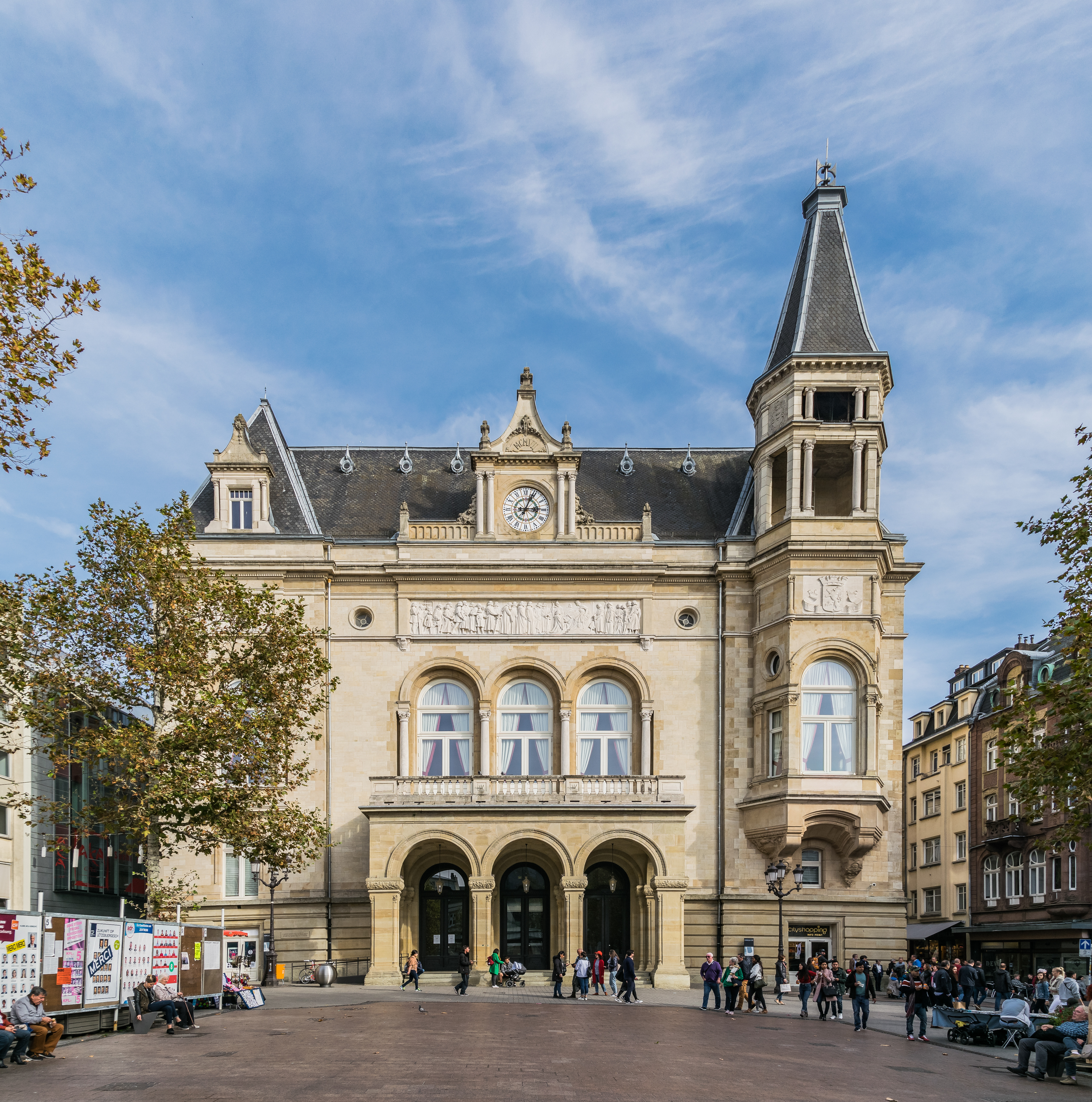
- The Cercle Cité on the Place d'Armes in the centre of Luxembourg City
- Interactive map of the Cercle Municipal area
- Alternative names: Cercle Cité

General information
- Architectural style: neo-baroque
- Location: Place d'Armes, Ville Haute, Luxembourg City, Luxembourg
- Opened: 1909
- Inaugurated: 1910
- Renovated: 2006-April 2011

Design and construction
- Architects: Pierre Funck; Paul Funck

The Cercle Municipal or Cercle Cité is a building in Luxembourg City, in southern Luxembourg. It is located at the eastern end of the Place d'Armes, in the historic central Ville Haute district of the city.

== History ==
On a site where there had previously been a building intended as a Cercle littéraire but which finally housed a restaurant by the name of Beim Gréitchen, the city decided to construct a grand administrative building. The design competition launched in 1902 was won in 1904 by Pierre and Paul Funck, a father and son team. The administration started to move into the neo-baroque building in 1909, but the official inauguration was in 1910. On the front, above the balcony, is a frieze depicting the granting of the city charter to Luxembourg City in 1244.

The building hosted the Court of Justice of the European Coal and Steel Community, which was established in Luxembourg in 1952, until 1969. It was used as the venue of public hearings of the court until a more permanent venue could be found, whilst other work was conducted at the Villa Vauban, in the Municipal Park.

Through 2020 and 2021, due to restrictions imposed by the COVID-19 pandemic, the Cercle Municipal became the meeting place of the Chamber of Deputies.

== Renovation and reopening ==
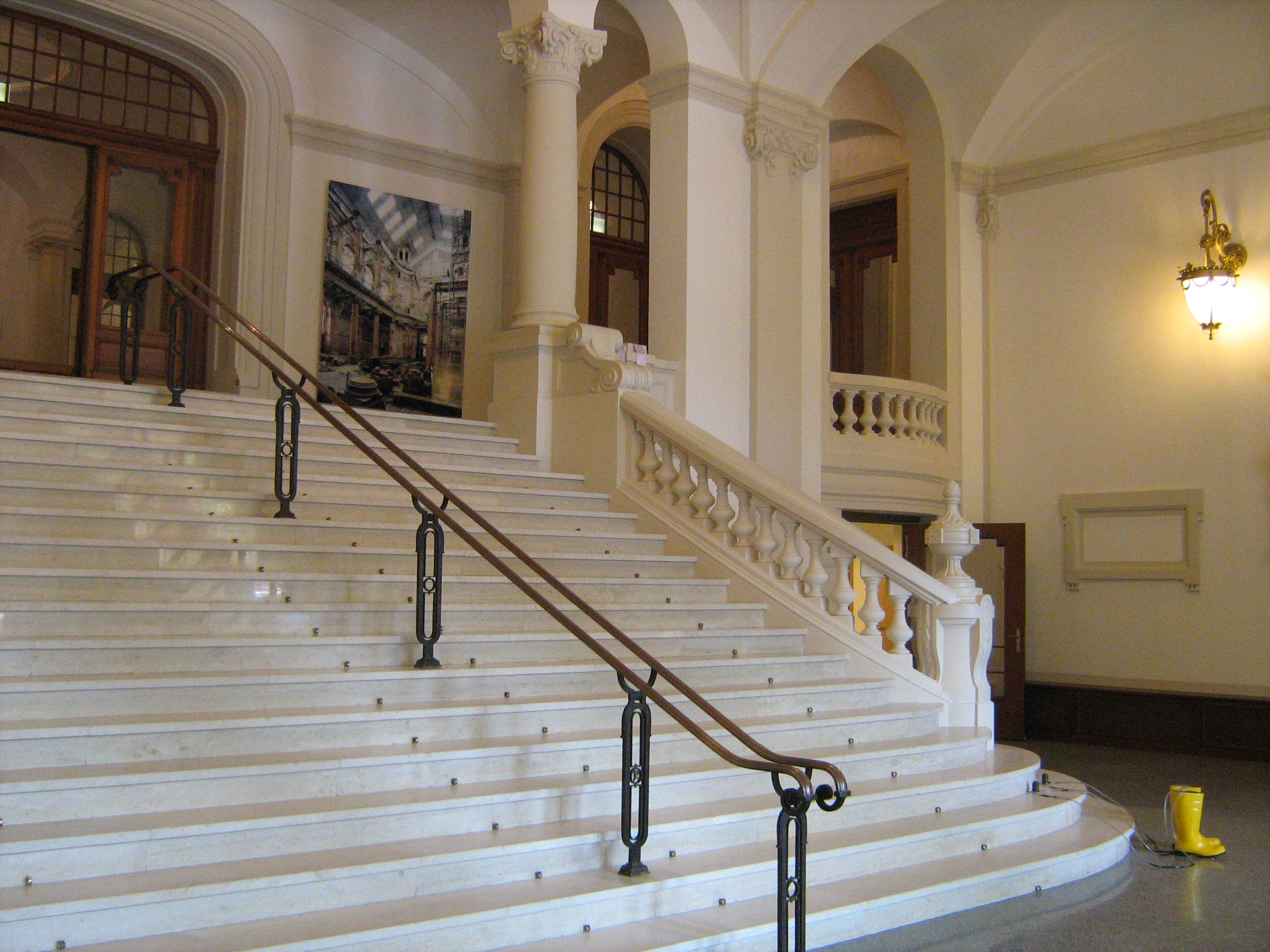
The Foyer after renovation (June 2011)

In 2006, comprehensive renovation and restoration work was carried out on the Cercle in order to transform it into a convention and exhibition centre. The work was completed in April 2011 providing not only enhancements to the Grande Salle and the Foyer but also to the cellar, which can now house exhibitions, and the former loft, now the fifth floor, where four rooms form a new conference centre. It took on the name Cercle-Cité after an adjacent building on the site of the former Ciné Cité was connected to the Cercle by means of a bridge over the Rue Genistre in order to expand the Cercle's facilities.
