= Paul Laurentius =

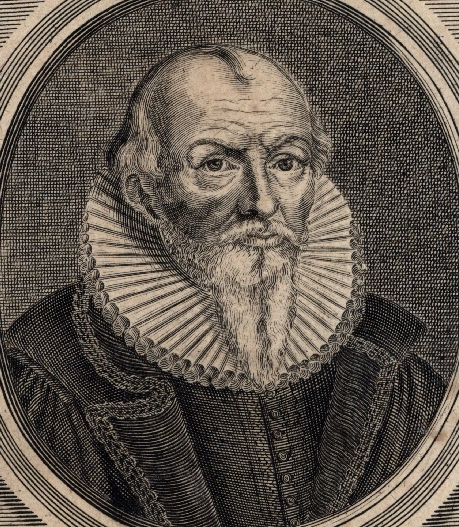
Portrait of Paul Laurentius

Paul Laurentius (March 30, 1554 – February 24, 1624), Lutheran divine, was at Oberwiera, where his father, of the same names, was pastor. From a school at Zwickau he entered (1573) the University of Leipzig, graduating in 1577. In 1578 he became rector of the Martin school at Halberstadt; in 1583 he was appointed towns preacher at Plauen, and in 1586 superintendent at Oelsnitz. On October 20, 1595, he took his doctorate in theology at Jena. His thesis on the Symboluin Atzanasii (1597), gaining him similar honours at Wittenberg and Leipzig. He was promoted (1605) to be pastor and superintendent at Dresden, and transferred (1616) to the superintendence at Meissen, where he died on February 24, 1624. His works consist chiefly of commentaries and expository discourses on prophetic books of the Old Testament, parts of the Psalter, the Lords Prayer and the history of the Passion. In two orations he compared Martin Luther to Elijah. Besides theological works he was the author of a Spicilegium Gnomonologicum (1612).

The main authority is C. Schlegel, the historian of the Dresden superintendents (1698), summarized by H. W. Roterinund, in the additions (1810) to Jocher, Gelehrten-Lexicon (1750).
