= Place Guillaume II =

Square in Luxembourg City, Luxembourg

Coordinates: 49°36′39″N 06°07′49″E

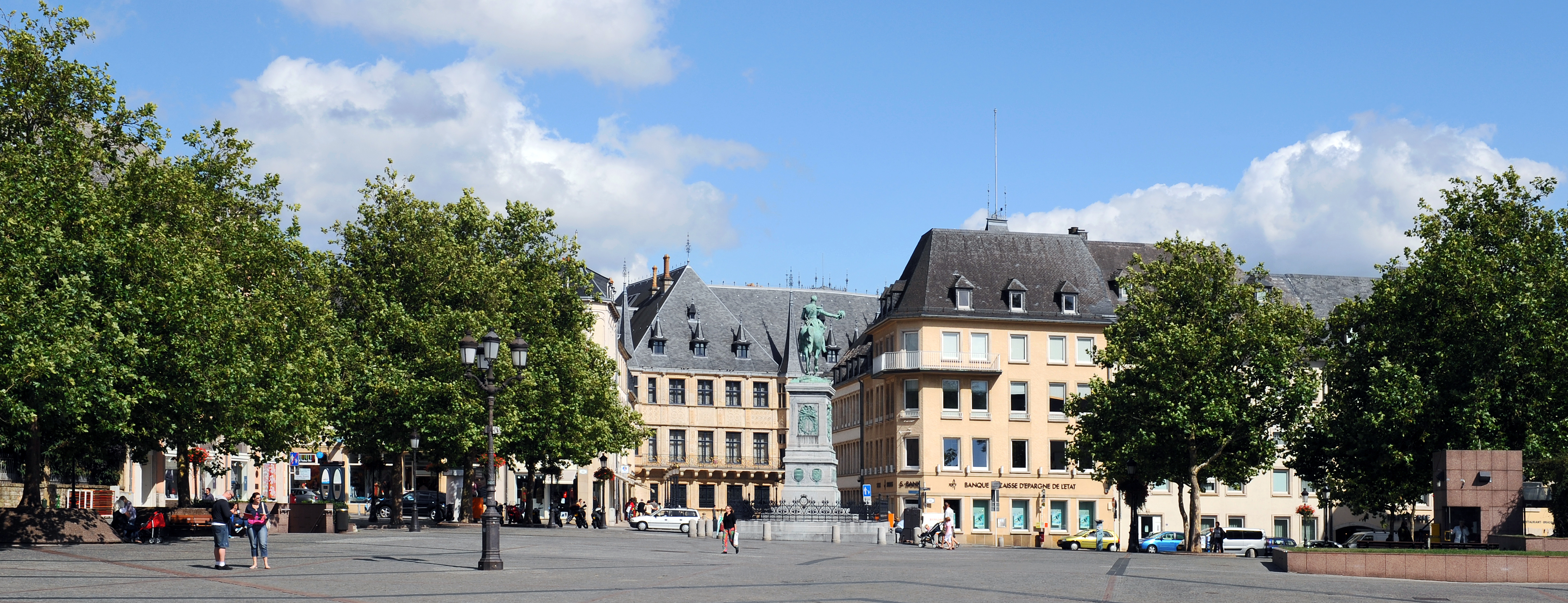
Place Guillaume II with the statue of Grand Duke William II, whose equestrian statue dominates the eastern half of the square and gives his (French) name to Place Guillaume II.

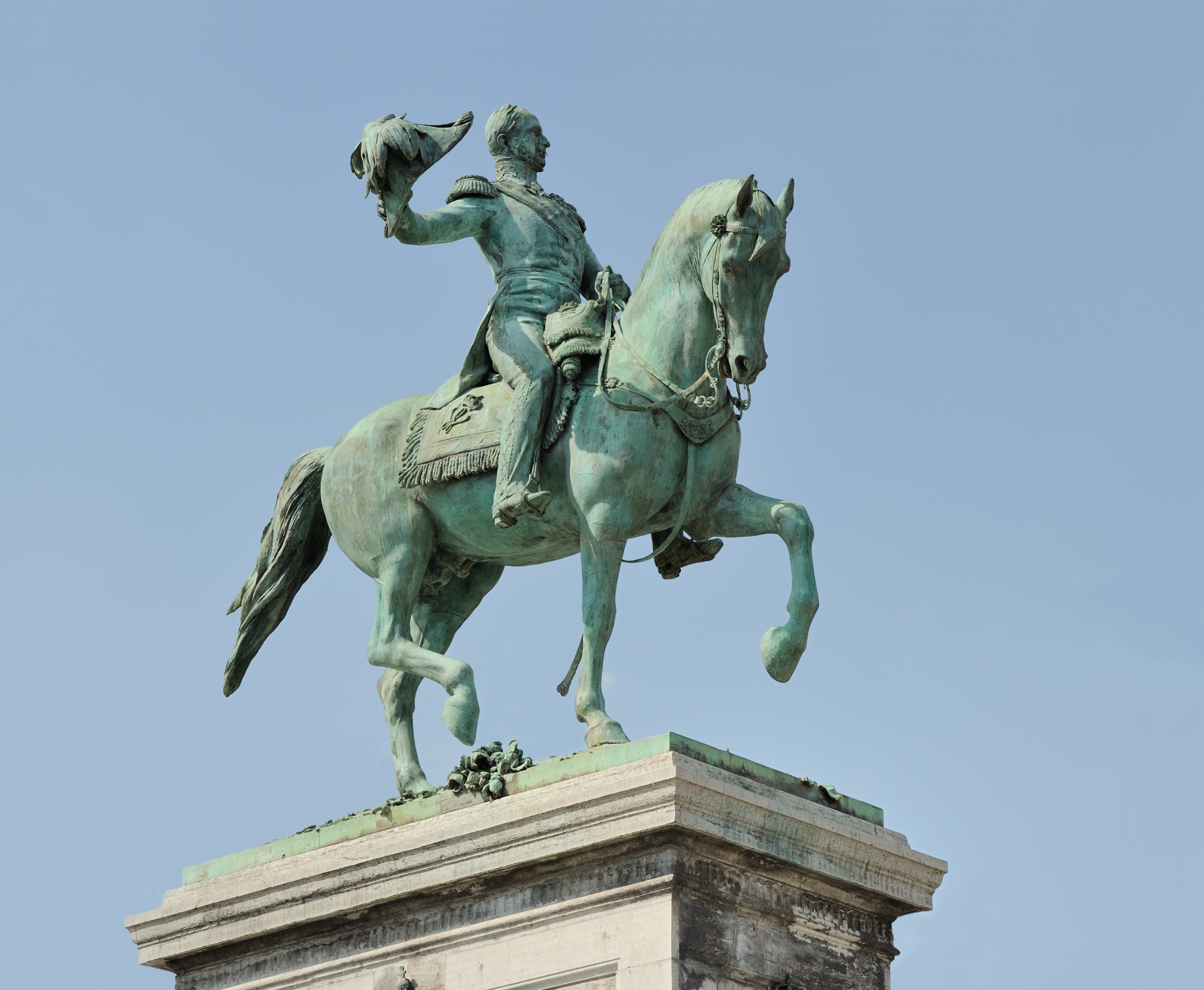
The equestrian statue of Grand Duke William II on the square

Place Guillaume II (French pronunciation: [plas ɡijom dø]) is a town square in Luxembourg City, in southern Luxembourg. The square is in the heart of Luxembourg's historic Ville Haute district. It is colloquially known as Knuedler, from the Luxembourgish language's word for "knot", referring to the knot in the belt worn by Franciscan friars.

The western half of the square is dominated by Luxembourg City Hall in the southwest, whilst the equestrian statue to former Grand Duke William II, after whom the square is named, is the prominent feature of the eastern half. Much of the square is ringed with trees, narrowing the open area (particularly around the statue).

The square was originally the site of a Franciscan monastery, hence the colloquial name. However, in 1797, during the French Revolutionary Wars, the monastery was dispossessed by occupying French soldiers. In 1804, the visiting Napoleon presented Place Guillaume II to the city as a gift. In 1829, plans were put in place to build a new town hall on the square, based upon the plans of Belgian architect Justin Remont. That same year, the deconstruction of the former monastery was completed, the material from which was used in the new building.

The town hall was completed in 1838, and first used by the city council, chaired by long-time Mayor François Scheffer. However, due to the ongoing Belgian Revolution, the official unveiling could not be held at the time. Instead, the town hall was officially unveiled on 15 July 1844 by Grand Duke William II, as was the statue in his likeness in Place Guillaume II.

Place Guillaume II was used as an open air music venue, hosting the Rock um Knuedler rock concert each year from 1991 to 2019. The Rock um Kneudler concerts are free to the public, and have been watched by audiences of up to 10,000. Since 1995, the concerts have been headlined by international acts, with the South African Johnny Clegg and the Italian Gianna Nannini topping the bill for the 2007 concert.
