= Nöckler =

Nöckler is a German surname. Notable people with the surname include:

- Bruno Nöckler (1956 – 1982), Italian alpine skier
- Dietmar Nöckler (born 1988), Italian cross-country skier

== See also ==
- Nocher
