= Buderscheid =

Coordinates: 49°56′N 5°57′E

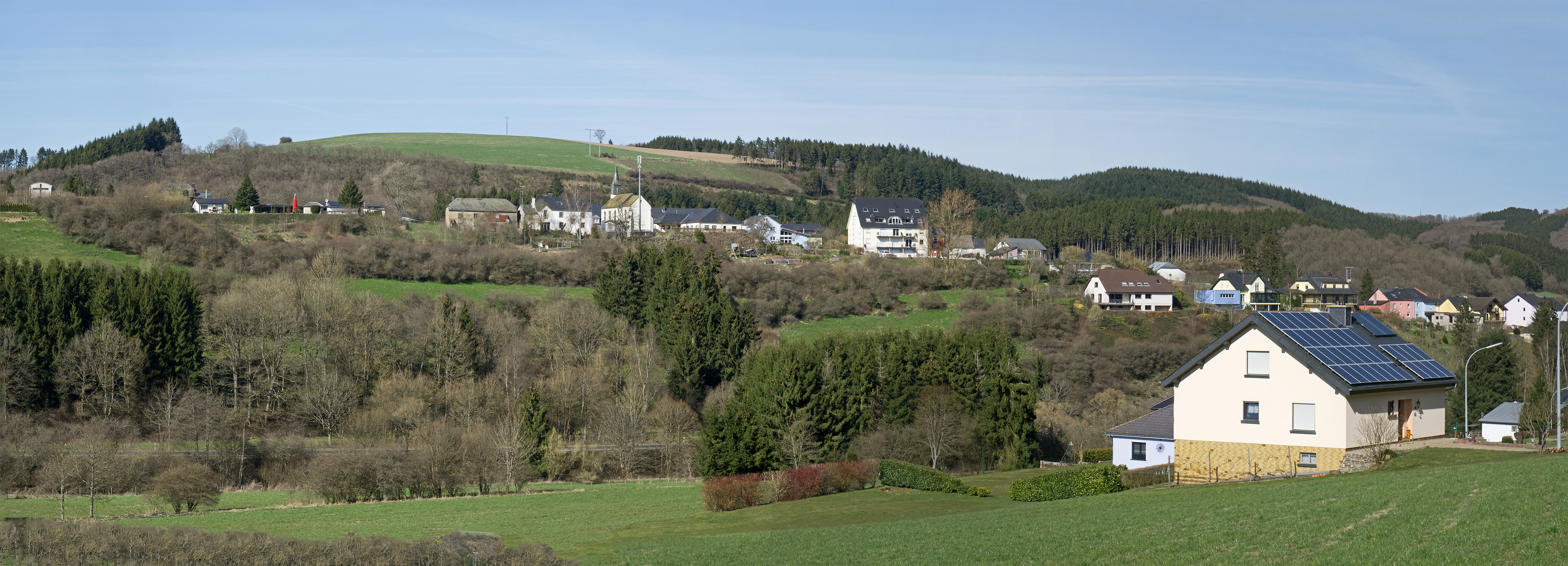
View of Buderscheid

Buderscheid (Luxembourgish: Bidscht, German: Büderscheid [ˈbyːdɐˌʃaɪt]) is a village in the commune of Goesdorf, in north-western Luxembourg. As of September 2026, the village had a population of 193.
