= Day G. Turner =

United States Army Medal of Honor recipient (1921–1945)

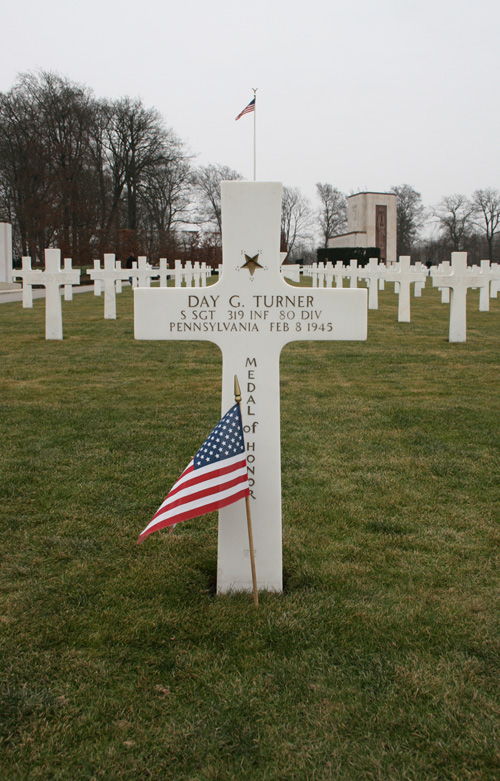
- Day G. Turner's grave at Luxembourg American Cemetery and Memorial
- Born: September 2, 1921; Berwick, Pennsylvania, US
- Died: February 8, 1945 (aged 23); Wallendorf, Germany
- Burial place: Luxembourg American Cemetery and Memorial
- Military career
- Allegiance: United States
- Branch: United States Army
- Service years: 1943–1945
- Rank: Staff Sergeant
- Service number: 33611056
- Units: 319th Infantry Regiment, 80th Infantry Division
- Conflicts: World War II
- Awards: Medal of Honor; Purple Heart

Day G. Turner (September 2, 1921 – February 8, 1945) was a United States Army soldier and a recipient of the Medal of Honor, the United States military's highest decoration, for his actions in World War II.

== Career ==
Turner joined the Army from Nescopeck, Pennsylvania in September 1943, and by January 8, 1945, was serving as a Sergeant in Company B, 319th Infantry Regiment, 80th Infantry Division. On that day, in Dahl, Luxembourg, Turner led his squad in the defense of a house against an intense German attack. Fighting hand-to-hand at times, the squad successfully repulsed the Germans and took dozens of prisoners. Turner was later promoted to Staff Sergeant, but was killed in combat exactly one month after his actions in Dahl. He was posthumously awarded the Medal of Honor on June 28, 1945, and buried at the Luxembourg American Cemetery and Memorial.

== Medal of Honor citation ==
Sergeant Turner's official Medal of Honor citation reads:

He commanded a 9-man squad with the mission of holding a critical flank position. When overwhelming numbers of the enemy attacked under cover of withering artillery, mortar, and rocket fire, he withdrew his squad into a nearby house, determined to defend it to the last man. The enemy attacked again and again and were repulsed with heavy losses. Supported by direct tank fire, they finally gained entrance, but the intrepid sergeant refused to surrender although 5 of his men were wounded and 1 was killed. He boldly flung a can of flaming oil at the first wave of attackers, dispersing them, and fought doggedly from room to room, closing with the enemy in fierce hand-to-hand encounters. He hurled handgrenade for handgrenade, bayoneted 2 fanatical Germans who rushed a doorway he was defending and fought on with the enemy's weapons when his own ammunition was expended. The savage fight raged for 4 hours, and finally, when only 3 men of the defending squad were left unwounded, the enemy surrendered. Twenty-five prisoners were taken, 11 enemy dead and a great number of wounded were counted. Sgt. Turner's valiant stand will live on as a constant inspiration to his comrades. His heroic, inspiring leadership, his determination and courageous devotion to duty exemplify the highest tradition of the military service.

== Day G. Turner Memorial in Dahl ==
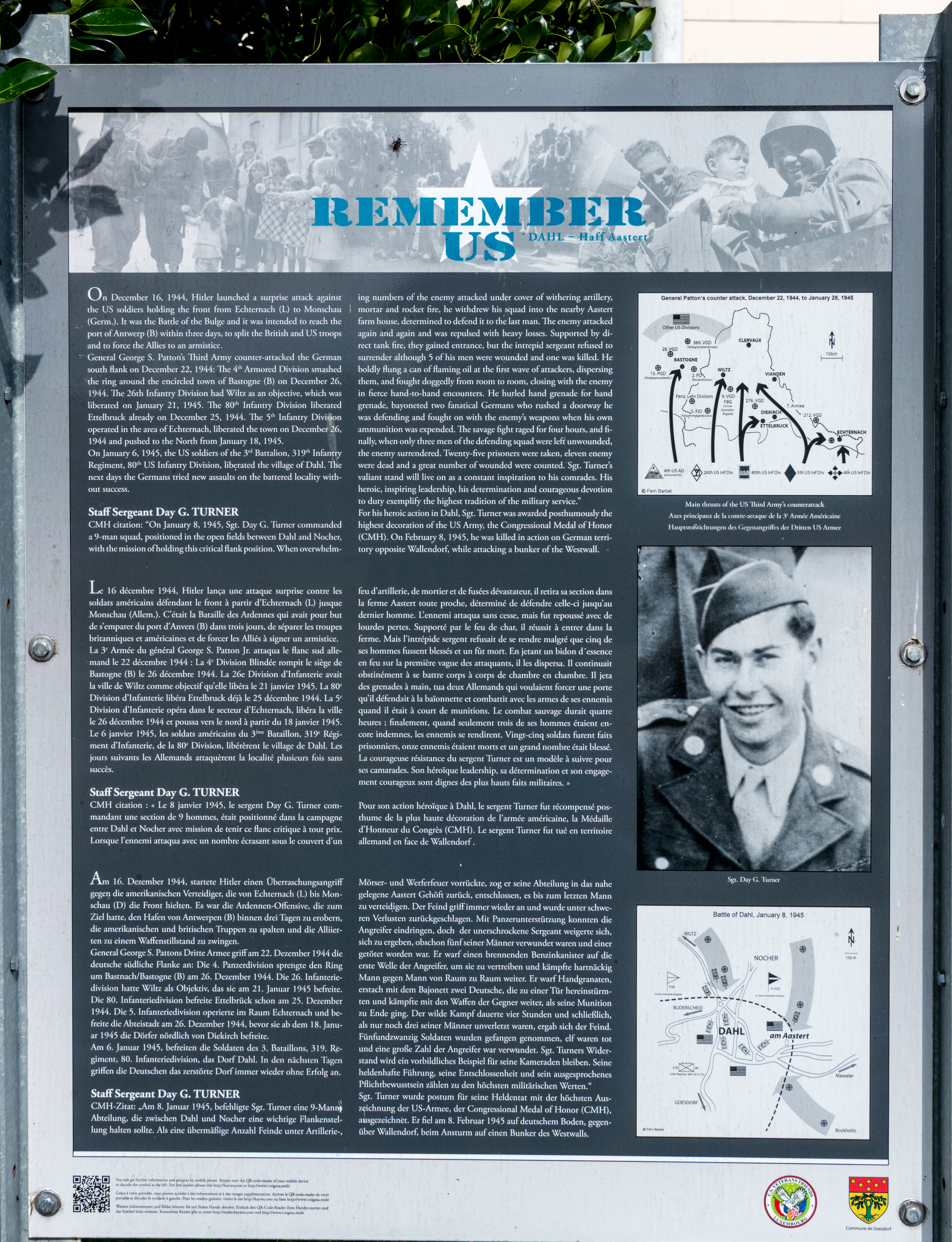

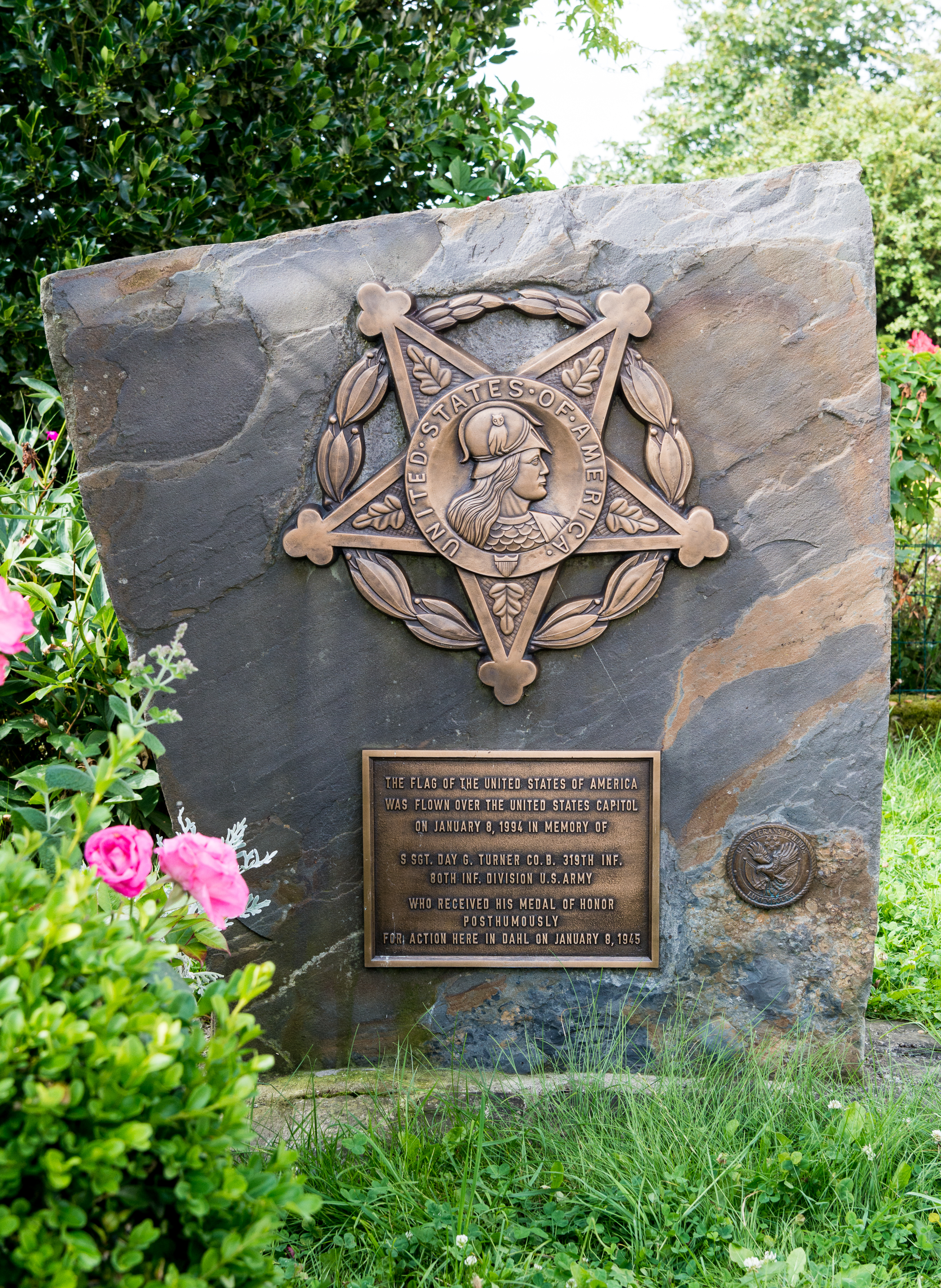

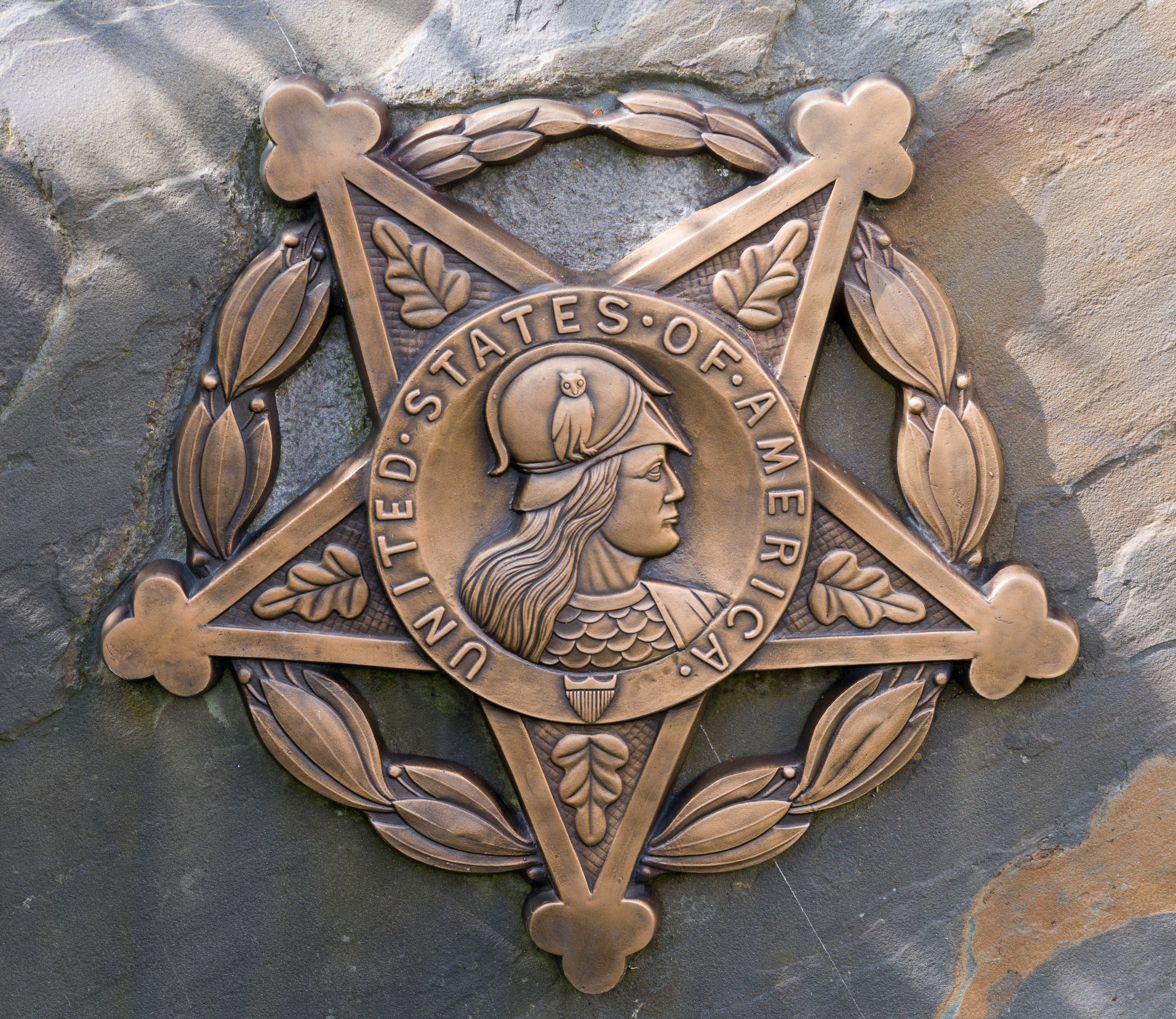

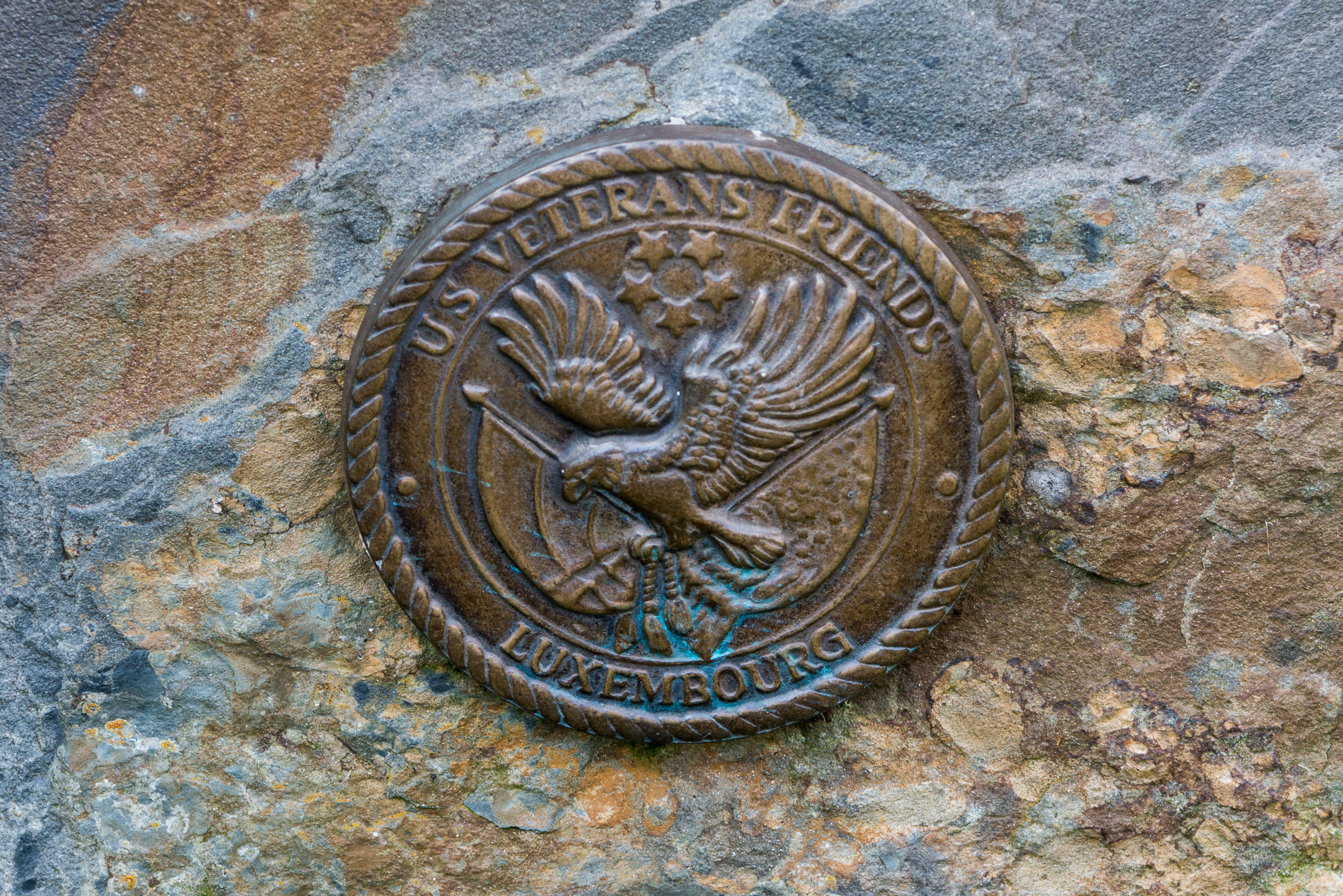

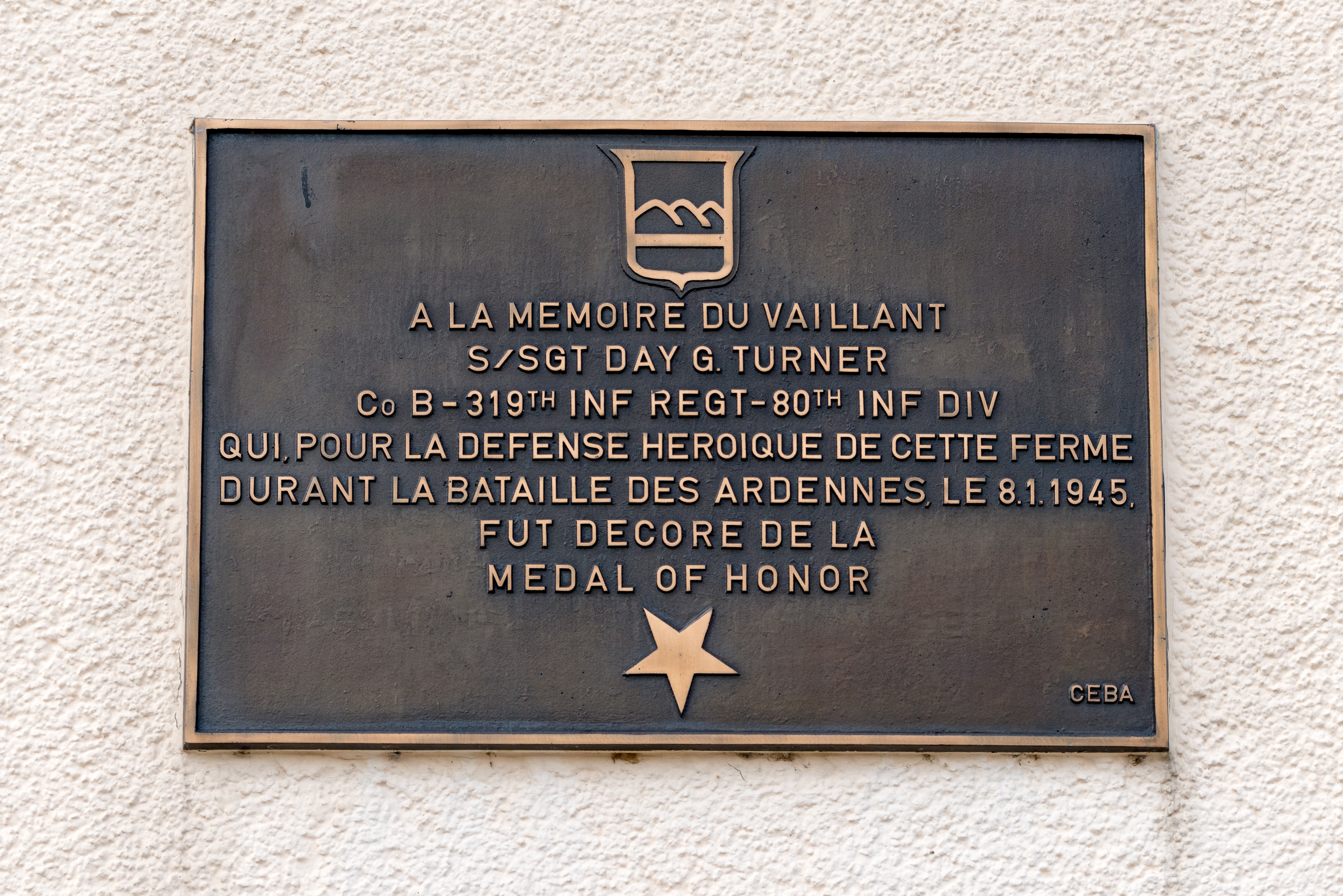

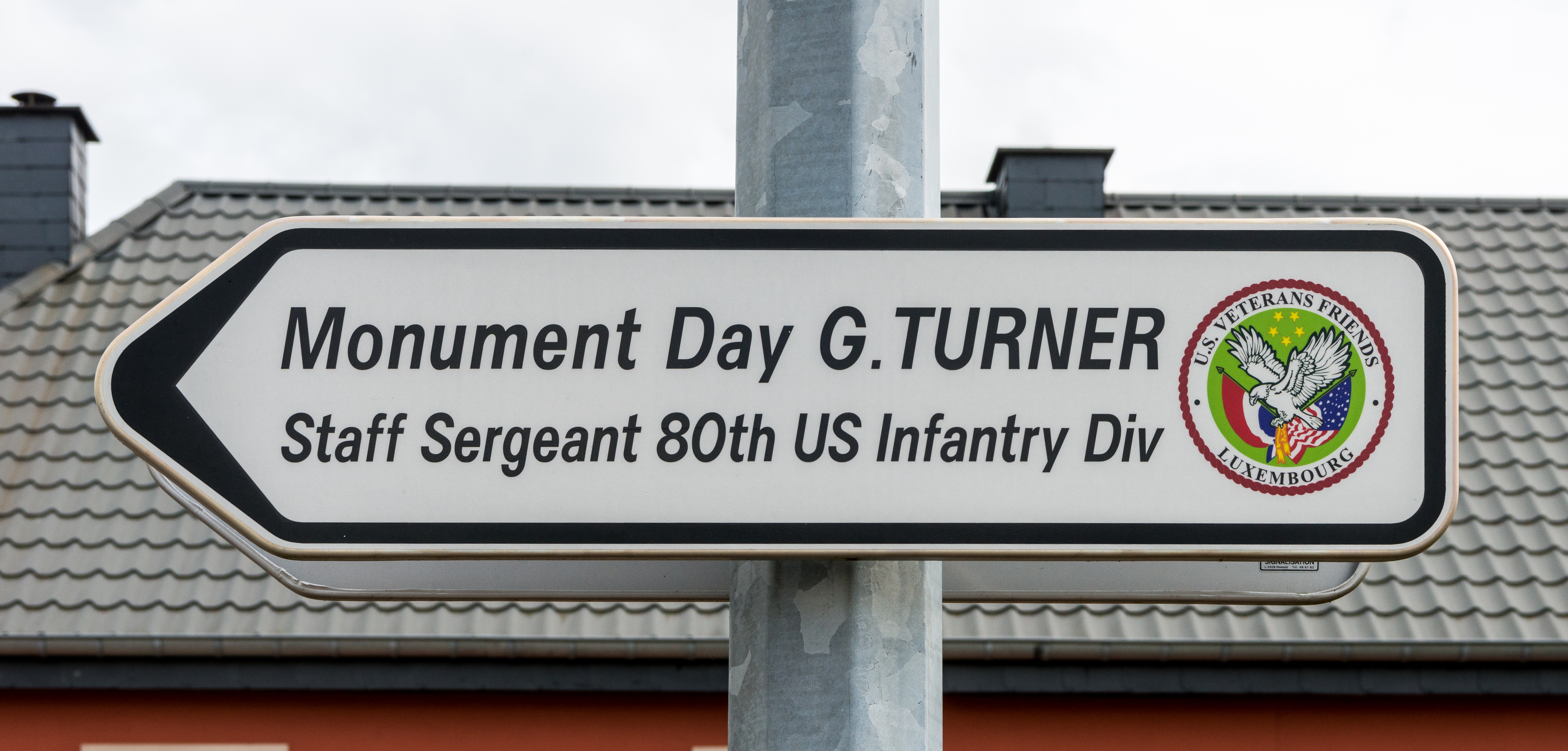

== See also ==
- List of Medal of Honor recipients
- List of Medal of Honor recipients for World War II
