= Nocher-Route =

Coordinates: 49.94639°N 5.97846°E

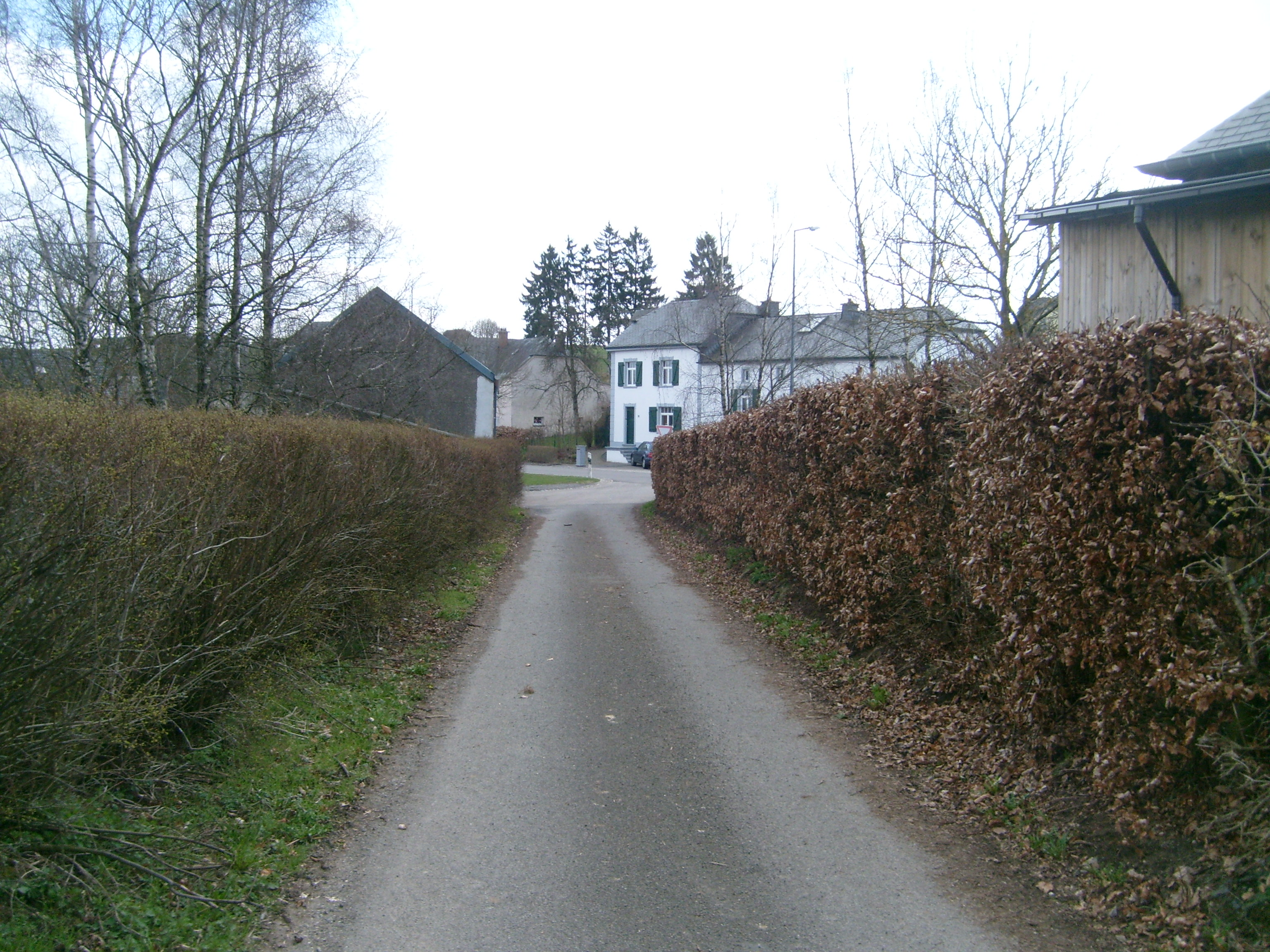
Street of the village of Nocher-Route, Oesling, Luxembourg

Nocher-Route (Luxembourgish: Nacherstrooss, German: Nocherstrasse) is a village in the commune of Goesdorf, in north-western Luxembourg. As of September 2026, the village had a population of 195.
