= Luxembourg American Cemetery and Memorial =

ABMC World War II cemetery in Hamm, Luxembourg

- American Battle Monuments Commission
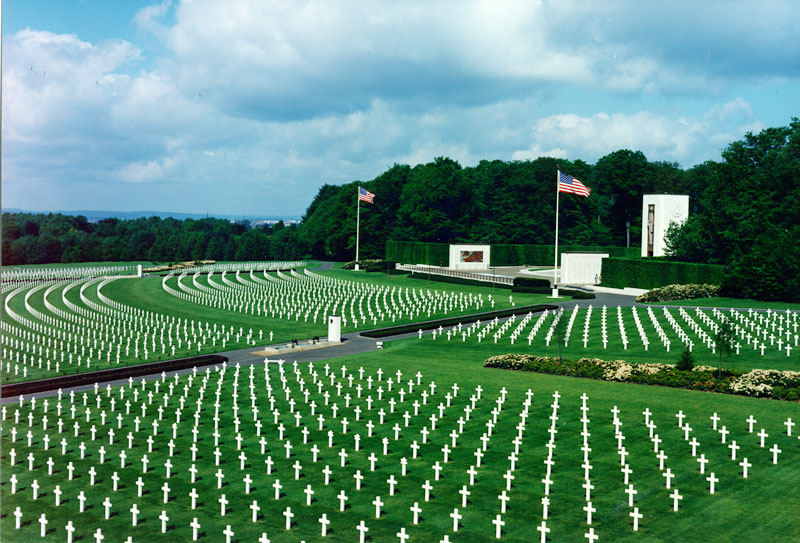
- View of the memorial site
- Used for those deceased 1944–1945
- Established: 29 December 1944
- Location: 49°36′42″N 06°11′08″E near Hamm, Luxembourg
- Designed by: Keally and Patterson (Monument); Alfred Geiffert Jr. (Landscaping)
- Total burials: >5,000
- Unknowns: 101

Luxembourg American Cemetery and Memorial is a Second World War American military war grave cemetery, located in Hamm, Luxembourg. The cemetery, containing 5,074 American war dead, covers 50.5 acres (20.4 ha) and was dedicated in 1960. It is administered by the American Battle Monuments Commission.

== History ==
The cemetery was established on 29 December 1944 by the 609th Quartermaster Company of the U.S. Third Army while Allied Forces were containing the German Ardennes offensive in the winter of 1944/1945. General George S. Patton used the city of Luxembourg as headquarters. Under a U.S.–Luxembourg treaty signed in 1951 the U.S. government was granted free use in perpetuity of the land covered by the cemetery.

== Layout ==
The 5,076 headstones are set in nine plots of fine grass, lettered A to I. Separating the plots are two malls radiating from the memorial and two transverse paths. Two flagpoles overlook the graves area. Situated between the two flagpoles lies the grave of General George S. Patton. Twenty-two sets of brothers rest side-by-side in adjacent graves. During the 1950s, the original wooden grave markers were replaced with headstones made of white Lasa marble. The new headstones were cemented onto concrete beams that run for more than six miles under the lawn of the grave plots.

Not far from the cemetery entrance stands the white stone chapel, set on a wide circular platform surrounded by woods. It is embellished with sculpture in bronze and stone, a stained-glass window with the insignia of the five major U.S. commands that operated in the region, and a mosaic ceiling.

== Notable burials ==
- Private William D. McGee (1923–1945 †), Medal of Honor recipient
- Colonel Lansing McVickar (1895–1945 †), recipient of the Bronze Star Medal and the Distinguished Service Cross
- George S. Patton (1885–1945), US general
- Sergeant Day G. Turner (1921–1945 †), Medal of Honor recipient

== Gallery ==
General Patton's grave

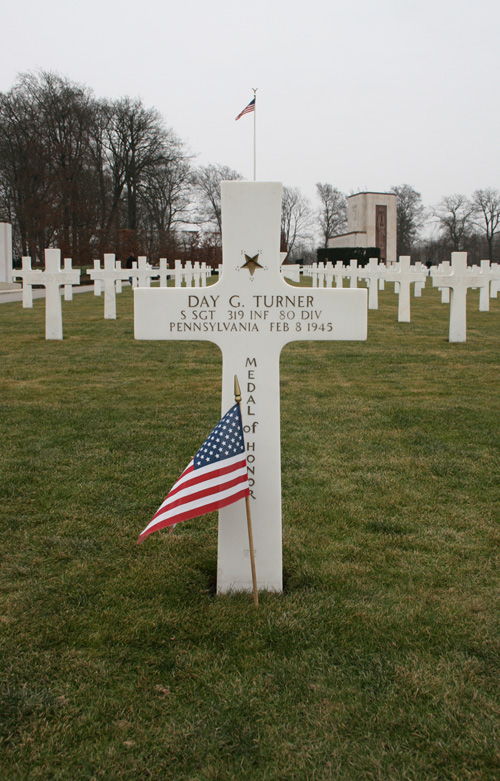
Grave of Day G. Turner, Medal of Honor recipient

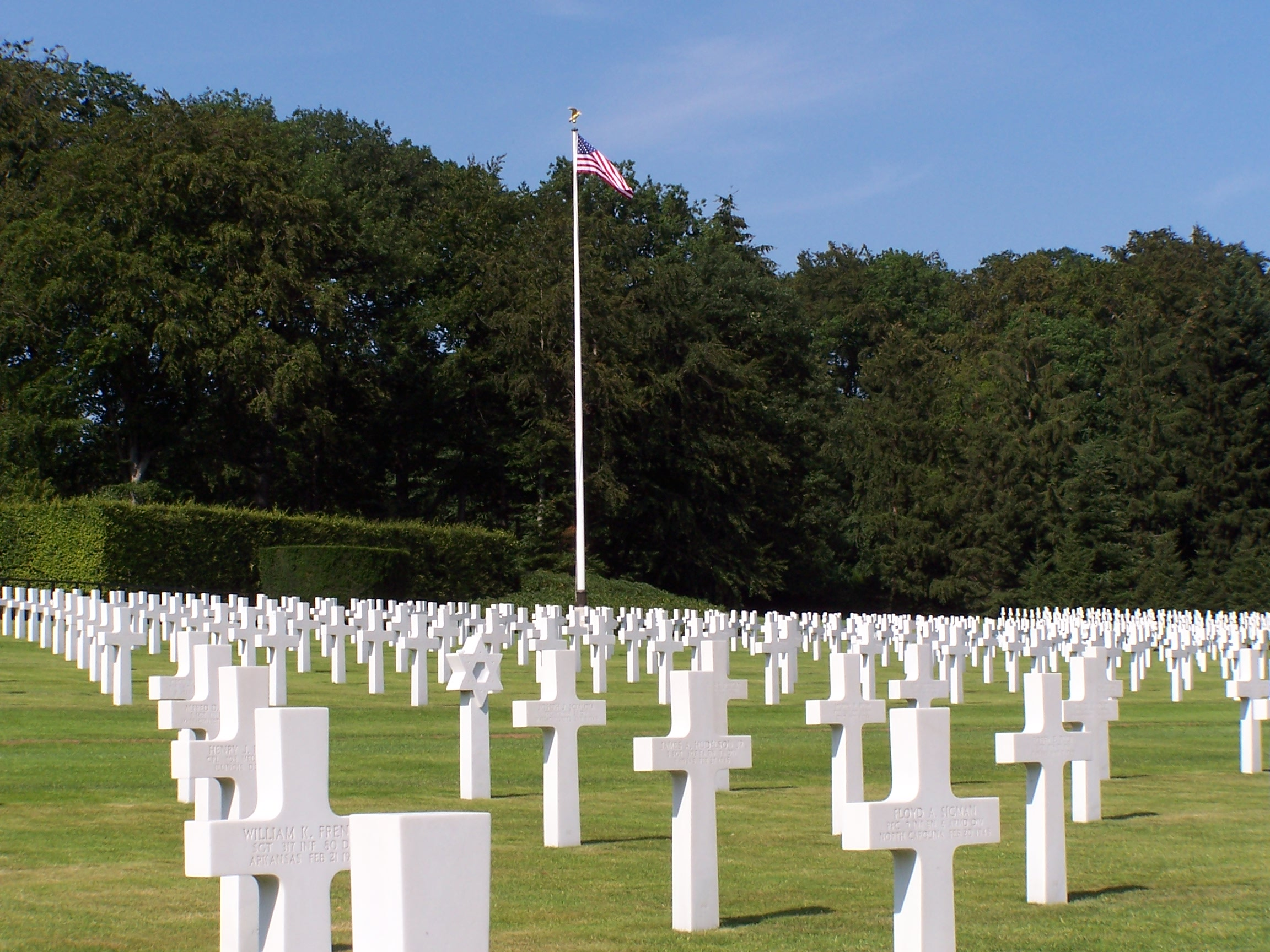
View from the rear of the cemetery

== See also ==
- Sandweiler German war cemetery – about 1.5 km (0.93 mi) away
