= Goesdorf =

Goesdorf Géisdref
- Commune
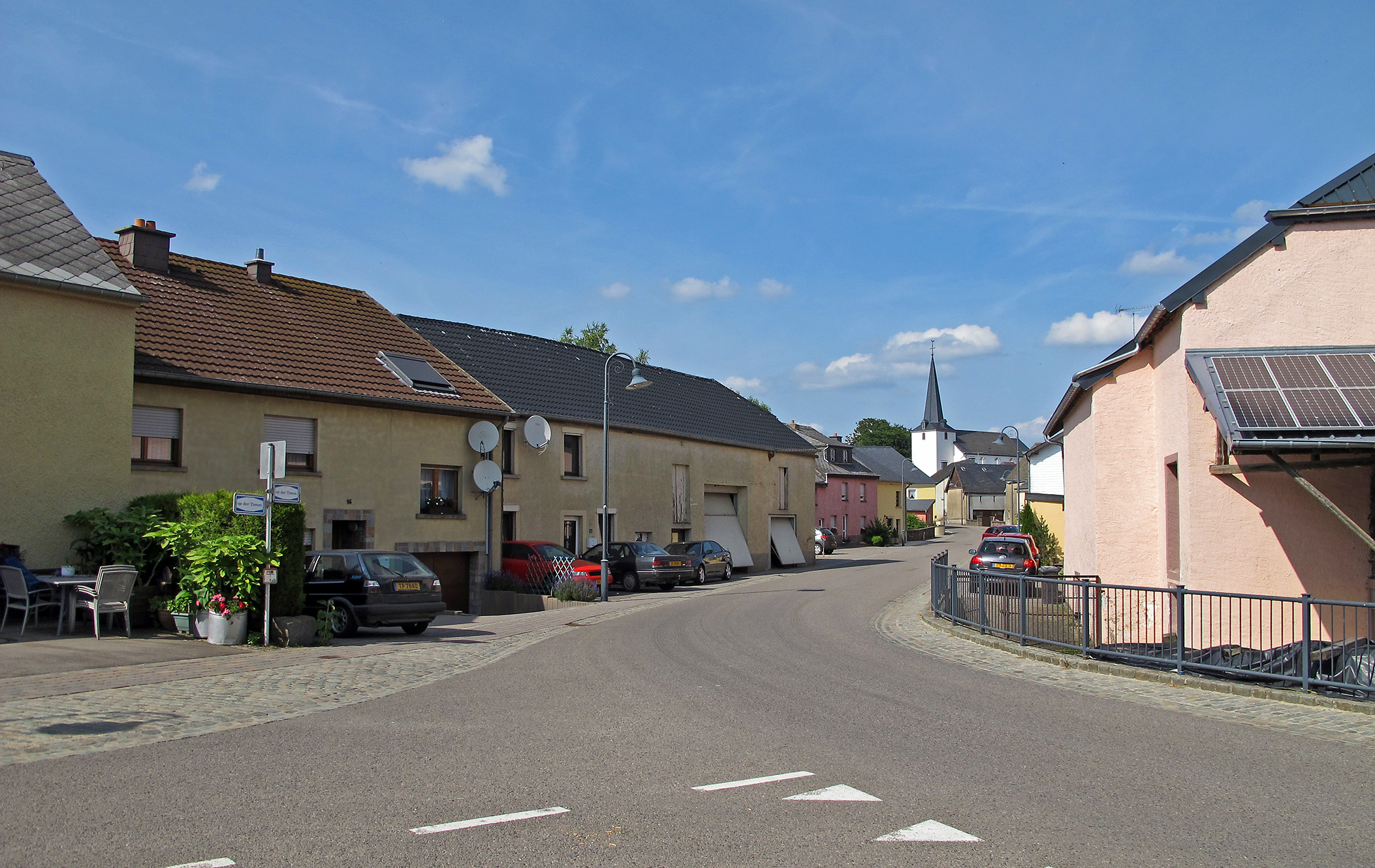

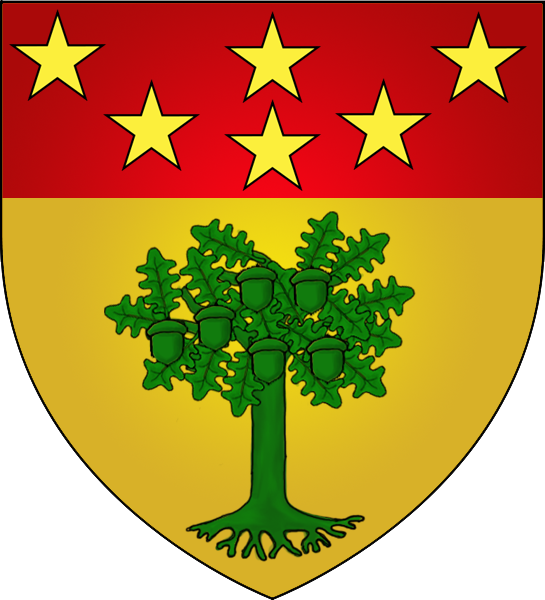
- Coat of arms

- Map of Luxembourg with Goesdorf highlighted in orange, and the canton in dark red
- Coordinates: 49.9167°N 5.9667°E
- Country: Luxembourg
- Canton: Wiltz

Government
  - Mayor: Jean-Paul Mathay

Area
  - Total: 29.41 km^{2} (11.36 sq mi)
  - Rank: 27th of 100
- Highest elevation: 498 m (1,634 ft)
  - Rank: 19th of 100
- Lowest elevation: 233 m (764 ft)
  - Rank: 44th of 100

Population (2025)
  - Total: 1,667
  - Rank: 88th of 100
  - Density: 56.68/km^{2} (146.8/sq mi)
  - Rank: 92nd of 100
- Time zone: UTC+1 (CET)
  - Summer (DST): UTC+2 (CEST)
- LAU 2: LU0000804
- Website: goesdorf.lu

Goesdorf (German pronunciation: [ˈɡøːsˌdɔʁf]; Luxembourgish: Géisdref) is a commune and village in north-western Luxembourg. It is part of the canton of Wiltz.

As of September 2026, the town of Goesdorf, which lies in the south of the commune, had a population of 310. Other towns within the commune include Buderscheid, Dahl, Nocher, and Nocher-Route.

== Population ==
Historical population

Year	Pop.	±%
1821	754	—
1851	1,203	+59.5%
1900	1,017	−15.5%
1910	1,064	+4.6%
1922	989	−7.0%
1935	948	−4.1%

Year	Pop.	±%
1947	805	−15.1%
1960	699	−13.2%
1970	657	−6.0%
1981	655	−0.3%
1990	716	+9.3%
2000	963	+34.5%

Year	Pop.	±%
2005	1,107	+15.0%
2010	1,264	+14.2%
2015	1,433	+13.4%
2020	1,568	+9.4%
2021	1,595	+1.7%

Source data
