= Dahl, Luxembourg =

Coordinates: 49°56′N 5°59′E

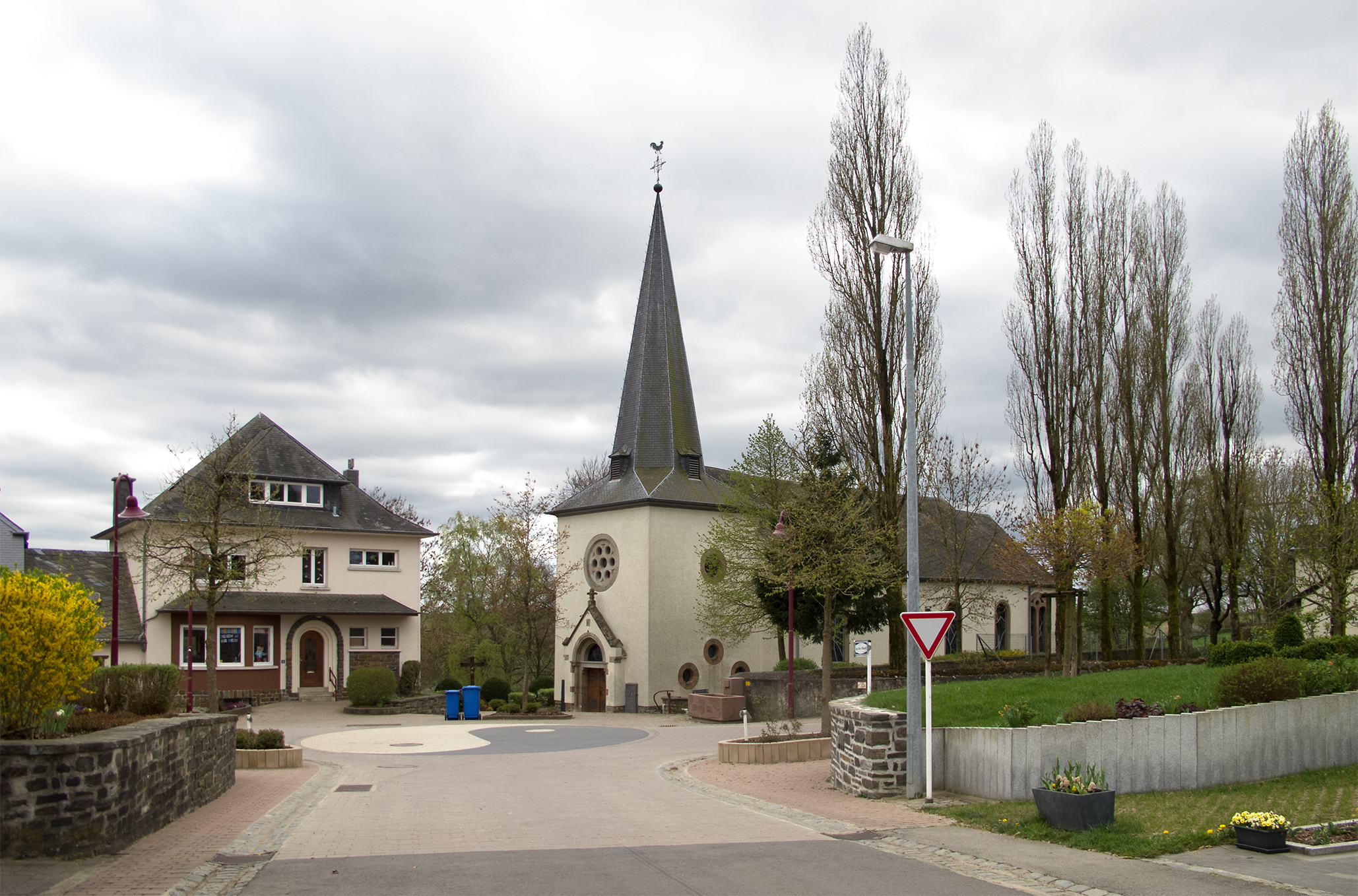
Dahl

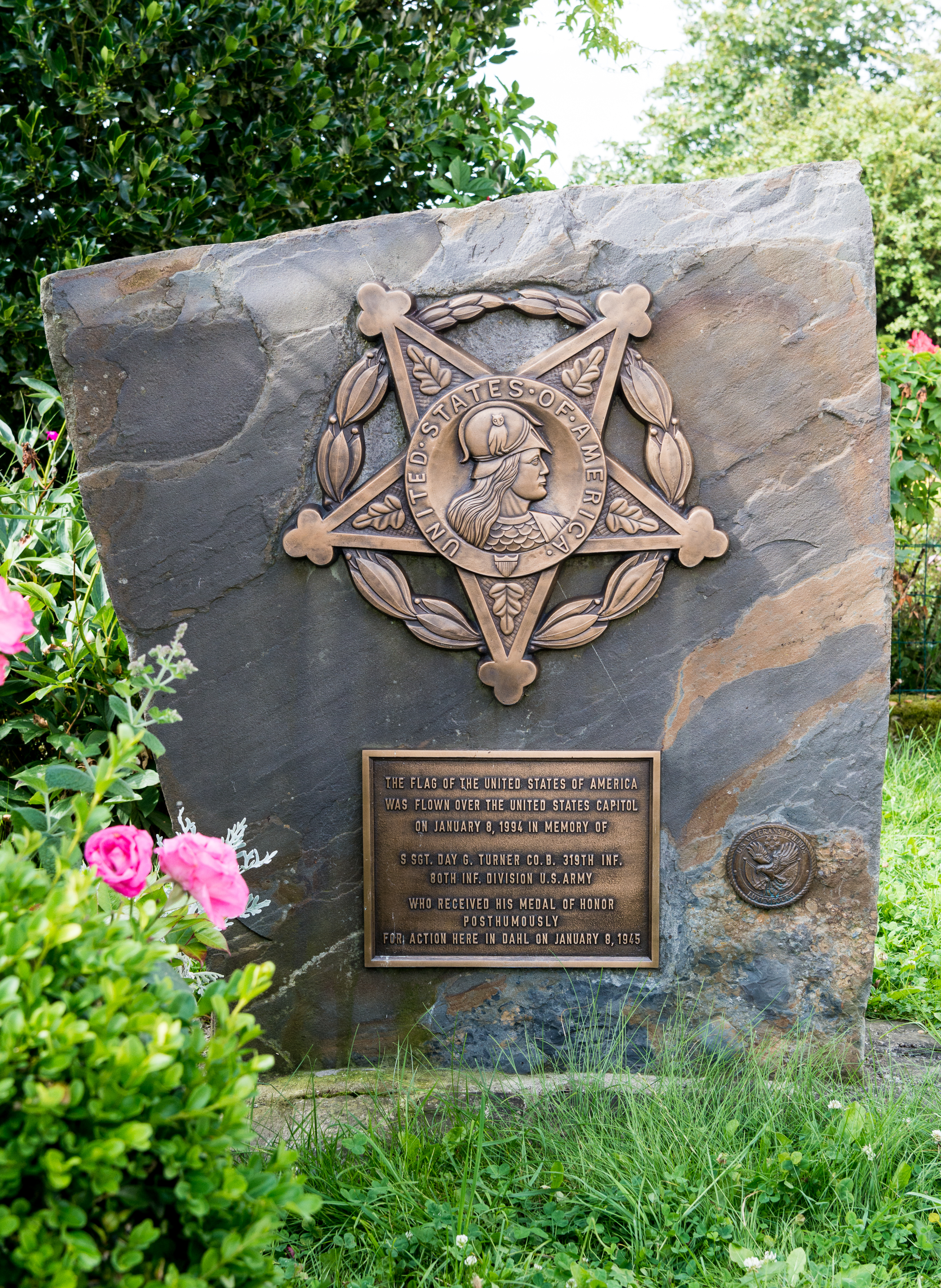
Medal of Honor recipient Day G. Turner Memorial in Dahl.

Dahl (German pronunciation: [daːl]; Luxembourgish: Dol) is a village in the commune of Goesdorf, in north-western Luxembourg. As of September 2026, the village has a population of 366.
