= Lansing McVickar =

American soldier (1895–1945)

Colonel Lansing McVickar
- Born: September 20, 1895; New London, Connecticut, US
- Died: February 24, 1945 (aged 49); Luxembourg
- Burial place: Luxembourg American Cemetery and Memorial
- Alma mater: St. Mark's School; Massachusetts Institute of Technology
- Military career
- Allegiance: United States of America
- Branch: United States Army
- Service years: 1918 - 1945
- Rank: Colonel
- Service number: O-161537
- Units: 1st Battalion, 7th Field Artillery, 1st Division; 44th Infantry Division Headquarters; 80th Infantry Division
- Commands: 156th Field Artillery Regiment; 318th Infantry Regiment
- Conflicts: Mexican Border War World War I: Montdidier-Noyon; Aisne-Marne; St. Mihiel; Meuse-Argonne; Lorraine 1917; Lorraine 1918; Picardy 1918; World War II: Northern France; Rhineland; Ardennes-Alsace; Central Europe; Battle of the Bulge; Battle of Falaise Gap
- Awards: American Campaign Medal; American Defense Service Medal; Army of Occupation of Germany Medal; Bronze Star Medal; Combat Infantryman Badge; Croix de Guerre; Distinguished Service Cross; European–African–Middle Eastern Campaign Medal; Mexican Border Service Medal; Purple Heart; Silver Star with Oak Leaf Cluster; World War I Victory MedaI; World War II Victory Medal with Six Clasps
- Other work: stockbroker with Henry L. McVikar

Lansing McVickar (September 20, 1895 – January 14, 1945) was a career officer with the United States Army. He was highly decorated for his service in World War II, World War I, and the Mexican Border War, including receiving a Bronze Star Medal and the Distinguished Service Cross.

== Early life ==
McVickar was born in New London, Connecticut, the son of Janet Lansing and Henry Goelet McVickar. The family also lived in Cambridge, Massachusetts and Suffolk County, New York. His maternal grandfather was Captain A. Breeze Lansing. His paternal grandfather was William Henry McVickar, a former commodore of the New York Yacht Club. His father died in 1919, followed by his mother in 1929.

He attended St. Mark's School, graduating in 1914. Next he attended the Massachusetts Institute of Technology, graduating in 1918. There, he was a member of the Fraternity of Delta Psi (St. Anthony Hall).

== Military career ==
McVickar joined Battery A of the Massachusetts National Guard and participated in the Mexican Border War. He then began Army training at Plattsburgh Military Base. He served as a second lieutenant in the 7th Field Artillery, 1st Division; he was later promoted to first lieutenant in the Headquarters, 1st Battalion, 1st Division, American Expeditionary Forces. During World War I, he was severely wounded in August 1918. On October 14, 1918, near Véry, France, he volunteered to take a gun to aid the infantry under "hazardous circumstances." He persisted despite the loss of two horses and several wounded men. When the group was under a barrage from the enemy, he came out from protective cover five times to move wounded comrades to safety. As a result, he received the Distinguished Service Cross "for extraordinary heroism." During World War I, he also received the Purple Heart and the Silver Star with Oak Leaf Cluster, and the Croix de Guerre.

Through the National Guard, he reached the rank of colonel. In September 1940, he was named commander of the 156th Field Artillery of the New York National Guard. The 156th was inducted into federal service at that time, with an assignment for Fort Dix in New Jersey. In October 1941, McVickar was assigned to the 44th Division Headquarters.

In 1944, he was in command of the 318th Regiment which spearheaded General George S. Patton's battles in France. In the Battle of Falaise Gap, the 318th played a prominent role. On November 11, 1944, under his leadership, the 318th was one of two regiments that captured Delme Ridge in the Nancy-Metz area. As a result, the 318th received a unit citation and he received the Bronze Star in December 1944. They received another citation for breaking through the Maginot Line in Saarbrücken, Germany in December 1944. In late December 1944 during the Battle of the Bulge, Patton's 80th division relieved Bastogne, Belgium, spearheaded by the 318th under McVickar. This relieved the 101st Airborne Division which was encircled by the Germans.

In December 1944, the Americans were in continuous action west and southwest of Ettelbruck, Luxembourg. Under the leadership of McVickar, they freed Ettlebruck from Nazi occupation on Christmas Day 1944. A few weeks later, McVickar was shot and killed while on a scouting mission.

== Commendations ==
- Mexican Border Service Medal, Mexican Border War
- Marksmanship Badge
- Croix de Guerre, World War I
- Distinguished Service Cross, World War I
- First Division Fourragère, World War I
- Purple Heart, World War I
- Silver Star with Oak Leaf Cluster, World War I
- World War I Victory Medal, World War I
- American Campaign Medal, World War II
- American Defense Service Medal, World War II
- Army of Occupation of Germany Medal, World War II
- Bronze Star Medal, World War II
- Combat Infantryman Badge, World War II
- Distinguished Unit Citation, World War II
- European–African–Middle Eastern Campaign Medal, World War II
- Presidential Unit Citation, World War II
- World War II Victory Medal with six clasps, World War II

== Honors ==
- The is a memorial dedicated to McVickar at the entrance of Ettelbruck, Luxembourg.
- The General Patton Memorial Museum in Ettelbruck, Luxembourg features McVickar's portrait and an exhibit covering his role in liberating the town and in the country's war history.

== Personal life ==
After World War I, McVickar became a stockbroker in New York City with his brother's firm Henry L. McVikar of 11 Wall Street. He was a member of the Racquet and Tennis Club of New York.

In Paris on October 17, 1925, McVickar married Frederika Peterson Jessup of New York. She was the daughter of Dr. Frederick Peterson, president of the Neurological Association of America, and had divorced Theodore Jessup in Paris in July 1925. She had one son and one daughter (Peter Jessup and Cecily Jessup) from her prior marriage. No announcement was made before the wedding and only a few close friends attended. However, a secret service man was on duty during the wedding to guard the jewels and gifts that were on display. The couple took a driving tour of the Italian lake district for their honeymoon and returned to New York City on November 3 aboard the SS Leviathan. They had two children: John Anthony McVickar and Madeleine Louise McVickar. They lived in Southampton, Long Island and Palm Beach, Florida.

In 1926, he was a groomsman for Louis Gordon Hamersley, the richest bachelor in New York, when he married Hilles Morris. However, his marriage failed by 1932 when he was living in Southampton, Long Island and Palm Beach, Florida without Frederika.

In December 1930, McVickar was sued for $25,000 by dancer Elizabeth Furst who claimed she had been injured when he moved his car while she was leaning on it on August 15, 1928. She said that McVickar and banker Harding Woodall kept her at the latter's hotel apartment overnight instead of taking her to the hospital. Furst sustained cuts, bruises, and a broken wrist which she said ruined her dancing career. She waited to sue because she thought McVickar would eventually pay for her ruined dress and hospital bill. McVickar denied the charges, indicating that Furst caused her own injuries. At the same time, she sued Frederick D. Underwood, former president of the Erie Railroad and father of her former fiancé, for $100,000 for slander.

McVickar later married Erna-Marie Ahrens. They lived in Cold Spring Harbor, Long Island. After his death in combat in 1945, McVickar was buried at the Luxembourg American Cemetery in Luxembourg City, Luxembourg.
