= William D. McGee =

United States Army Medal of Honor recipient

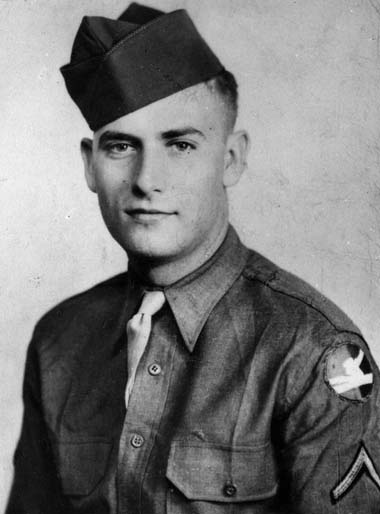
- Born: January 19, 1923; Indianapolis, Indiana, US
- Died: March 19, 1945 (aged 22) near Mülheim an der Mosel, Germany
- Burial place: Luxembourg American Cemetery
- Military career
- Allegiance: United States
- Branch: United States Army
- Service years: 1943 - 1945
- Rank: Private
- Units: 304th Infantry Regiment, 76th Infantry Division
- Conflicts: World War II
- Awards: Medal of Honor; Purple Heart

William D. McGee (January 19, 1923 – March 19, 1945) was a United States Army soldier and a recipient of the United States military's highest decoration—the Medal of Honor—for his actions in World War II.

== Biography ==
McGee joined the Army from his birth city of Indianapolis, Indiana, in 1943, and by March 18, 1945, was serving as a private in the Medical Detachment of the 304th Infantry Regiment, 76th Infantry Division. On that day, near Mülheim, Germany, he voluntarily walked into a minefield to aid two comrades who had been wounded by anti-personnel mines. After carrying one man to safety, he returned to rescue the second man but stepped on a mine and was himself seriously wounded. He ordered his fellow soldiers to stay out of the minefield and not risk their safety by trying to rescue him; McGee died of his injuries the next day. For these actions, he was posthumously awarded the Medal of Honor a year later, on February 26, 1946.

McGee was buried at the Luxembourg American Cemetery in the city of Luxembourg. His grave can be found in plot C-7-13.

== Medal of Honor citation ==
Private McGee's official Medal of Honor citation reads:

A medical aid man, he made a night crossing of the Moselle River with troops endeavoring to capture the town of Mulheim. The enemy had retreated in the sector where the assault boats landed, but had left the shore heavily strewn with antipersonnel mines. Two men of the first wave attempting to work their way forward detonated mines which wounded them seriously, leaving them bleeding and in great pain beyond the reach of their comrades. Entirely on his own initiative, Pvt. McGee entered the minefield, brought out 1 of the injured to comparative safety, and had returned to rescue the second victim when he stepped on a mine and was severely wounded in the resulting explosion. Although suffering intensely and bleeding profusely, he shouted orders that none of his comrades was to risk his life by entering the death-sown field to render first aid that might have saved his life. In making the supreme sacrifice, Pvt. demonstrated a concern for the well-being of his fellow soldiers that transcended all considerations for his own safety and a gallantry in keeping with the highest traditions of the military service.

== Awards and decorations ==

Badge	Combat Medical Badge		
1st row	Medal of Honor		
2nd row	Bronze Star Medal	Purple Heart	Army Good Conduct Medal
3rd row	American Campaign Medal	European–African–Middle Eastern Campaign Medal with 1 campaign star	World War II Victory Medal

== See also ==
- List of Medal of Honor recipients
