= Nocher =

Coordinates: 49°57′N 5°59′E

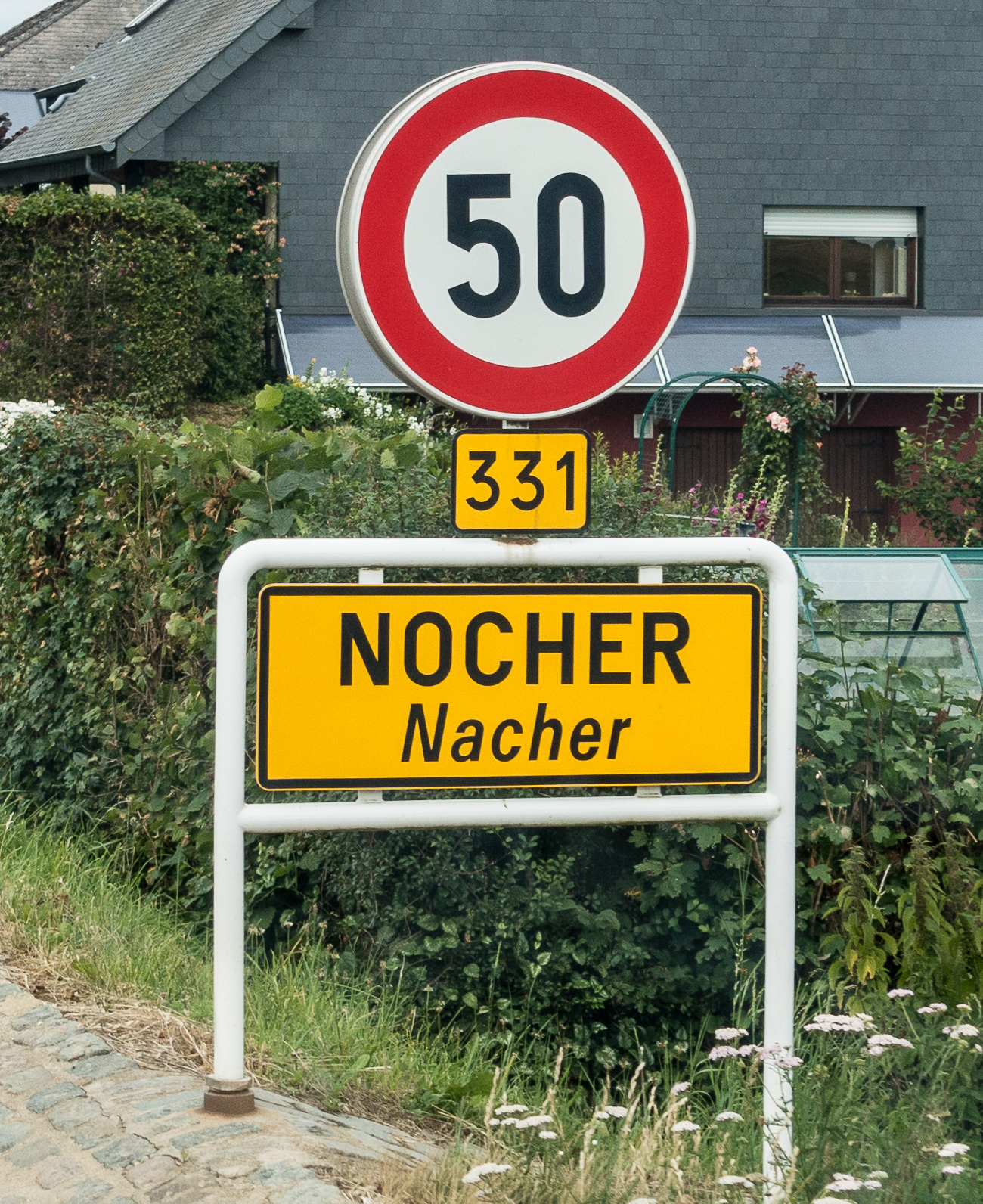
Nocher / Nacher

Nocher (German pronunciation: [ˈnɔxɐ]; Luxembourgish: Nacher) is a village in the commune of Goesdorf, in north-western Luxembourg. As of September 2026, the village had a population of 448.
