= Timeline of Luxembourg City =

The following is a timeline of the history of Luxembourg City, Luxembourg.

== Prior to 19th century ==
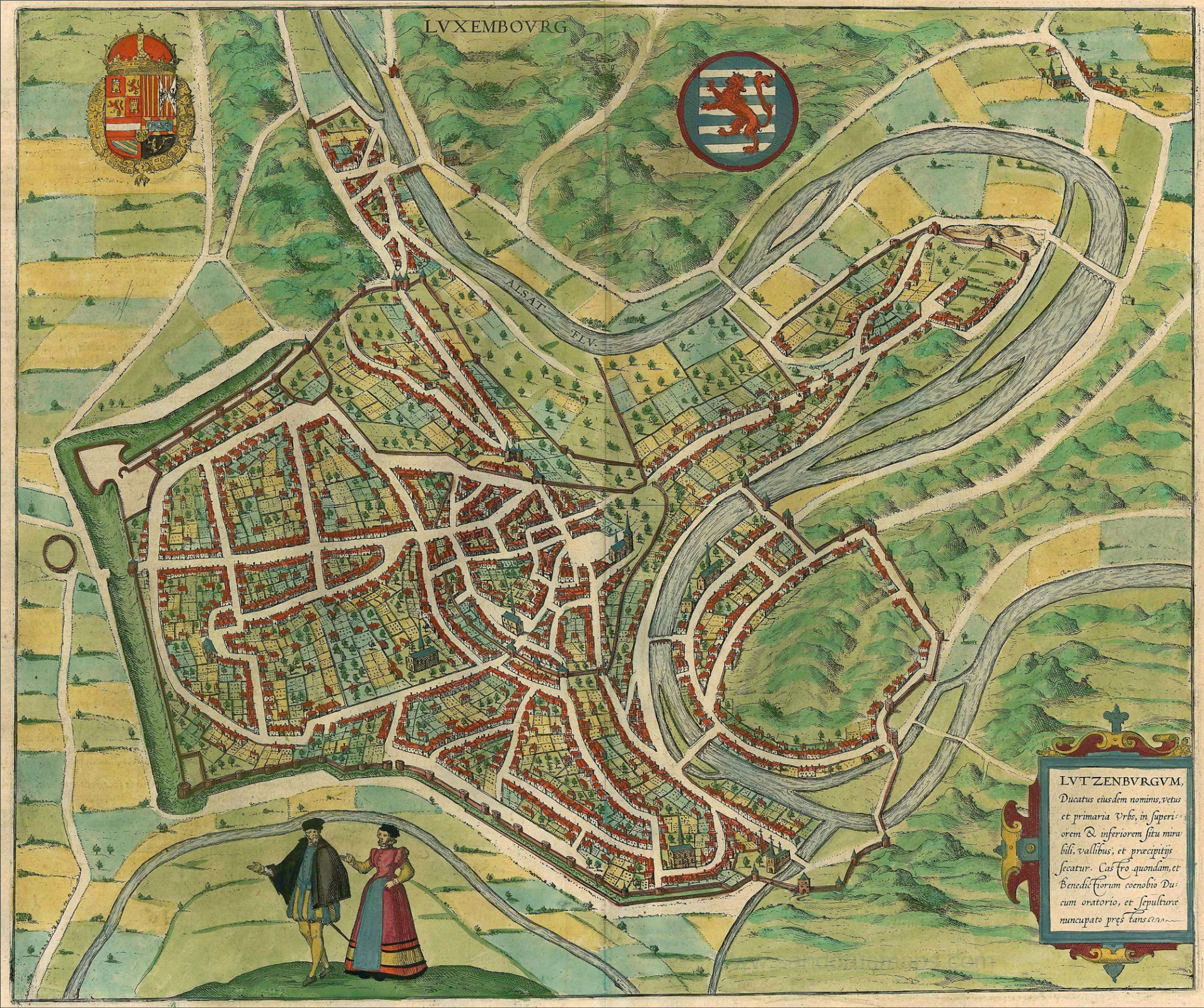
Map of Luxembourg, 1581

- 963 - Bock rock acquired by Siegfried of Luxembourg, who begins construction of a castle.
- 987 - Church of the Redemption consecrated.
- 1120 - Church of St. Peter built.
- 1320 - Saint Michael's Church built (approximate date).
- 1340
  - New city fortifications constructed.
  - Schobermesse (tent fair) begins.
- 1390 - Public clock installed (approximate date).
- 1443 - Burgundians under Philip the Good conquer city.
- 1554 - Lightning strikes the Franciscan church, where gunpowder barrels are stored; the ensuing explosion and fires destroy a large part of Ville Haute.
- 1563 - La Fontaine Castle construction begins.
- 1572 - New City Hall (later the Grand Ducal Palace) built in place of the one destroyed in 1554
- 1603 - Collège des Jésuites founded.
- 1606 - Neumünster Abbey built.
- 1613 - Church of Notre Dame cornerstone laid.
- 1623 - Capuchin monastery built.
- 1644 - Tunnels built.
- 1671 - Place d'Armes laid out (approximate date).
- 1684 - French in power.
- 1685 - Lambert Fortress built.
- 1693 - Jean-Bernard Knepper becomes mayor.
- 1697 - Spaniards in power per Treaty of Ryswick.
- 1714 - Austrians in power.
- 1732 - Fort Thüngen built.
- 1779 - Saint Nicholas' Church demolished.
- 1784 - Château de Septfontaines built outside city (in Rollingergrund).
- 1794 - 22 November: Siege of Luxembourg by French forces begins.
- 1795
  - 7 June: Siege of Luxembourg ends.
  - City becomes préfecture of the Forêts département of the French First Republic.
- 1798 - Municipal Library active.
- 1800 - François Scheffer becomes mayor.

== 19th century ==
- 1815 - Prussians in power per Treaty of Paris.
- 1821 - Luxemburger Wochenblatt newspaper begins publication.
- 1827 - Journal de la ville et du Grand-Duché de Luxembourg newspaper in publication.
- 1833 - Roman Catholic diocese of Luxembourg established.
- 1838 - City Hall (Hôtel de Ville) completed.
- 1848 - Luxemburger Wort newspaper begins publication.
- 1850 - Society of the Natural Sciences established.
- 1855 - Pescatore Institute (charity) founded.
- 1858 - Population: 13,129.
- 1859 - Luxembourg railway station opens.
- 1860 - Hall of the Chamber of Deputies.
- 1861 - Viaduct built over Petrusse valley.
- 1867
  - Luxembourg Crisis.
  - Dismantling of the fortress begins per Treaty of London.
  - Last Prussian garnison leaves the city.
- 1868 - Royal-Grand Ducal Institute established.
- 1872
  - The Municipal Park is laid out.
  - Pescatore Museum opens.
- 1875 - The city's first horse-drawn tramway line begins operation.
- 1882 - Casino Bourgeois opens.
- 1884 - William II monument erected in Place Guillaume II.
- 1890 - City becomes part of independent Grand Duchy of Luxembourg.
- 1892 - Museum of Natural History opens in Pfaffenthal.
- 1894 - Émile Mousel becomes mayor.
- 1895 - Ons Hemecht begins publication.

== 20th century ==
- 1903 - The Adolphe Bridge is completed.
- 1904 - Alphonse Munchen becomes mayor.
- 1905 - Population: 20,984.
- 1906 - The Conservatoire de Luxembourg is founded.
- 1908 - The tramway network is electrified.
- 1910 - The Cercle Municipal building is inaugurated.
- 1913 - Luxembourg railway station is rebuilt.
- 1914 - German occupation begins.
- 1918 - German occupation ends.
- 1919 - Football Club Amis des Sports Lëtzebuerg-Fëschmaart is founded.
- 1920
  - The city is merged together with the neighbouring communes of Hamm, Hollerich, Eich and Rollingergrund, increasing its area from 3.55 km² to 51.52 km².
  - The Villa Louvigny is built.
- 1921 - Gaston Diderich (LL) becomes mayor.
- 1923 - The Gëlle Fra war memorial is erected.
- 1926 - The city's first municipal bus lines begin operation.
- 1930s - Sandweiler Airport opens.
- 1933 - The Luxembourg Philharmonic Orchestra is founded.
- 1940
  - 10 May: German occupation begins.
  - 18 August: A Volksdeutsche Bewegung rally is held.
- 1943: Nazi occupiers incorporate Walferdange, Strassen and parts of Hesperange into the city.
- 1944
  - 10 September: the city is liberated by Allied forces, ending German occupation. Pre-occupation city boundaries are restored.
  - Luxembourg American Cemetery and Memorial established.
  - December: the city is besieged by German V-3 cannon.
- 1946 - Émile Hamilius (DP) becomes mayor.
- 1952 - European Coal and Steel Community, European Commission, and European Court of Justice headquartered in city.
- 1953 - European School of Luxembourg I established.
- 1962 - Eurovision Song Contest 1962 held.
- 1964
  - Paul Wilwertz (LSAP) becomes mayor.
  - Municipal Theatre built.
  - The last line of the tramway network ceases operation.
- 1966
  - The "Héichhaus", Luxembourg's first skyscraper, is completed in Kirchberg.
  - The Grand Duchess Charlotte Bridge opens, marking the start of the urbanisation of the Kirchberg plateau.
  - Eurovision Song Contest 1966 held.
- 1968 - The European Investment Bank headquarters relocate to Luxembourg.
- 1969 - Colette Flesch (DP) becomes mayor.
- 1973
  - The National Library of Luxembourg relocates to the former Athénée building.
  - The Rugby Club Luxembourg is formed.
  - Eurovision Song Contest 1973 held.
- 1975
  - The European Court of Auditors is headquartered in city.
  - The city's Cinémathèque is founded.
- 1976
  - The Municipal Hospital opens.
  - An explosion in Pfaffenthal, caused by the release of gasoline, kills 3, injures at least 20 and destroys or damages around 20 homes.
- 1977 - The Hamilius bus terminal begins operation, alongside the country's first underground parking garage.
- 1979 - Ons Stad begins publication.
- 1980 - Camille Polfer (DP) becomes mayor.
- 1982
  - Lydie Polfer (DP) becomes mayor.
  - St. Peter and Paul Church consecrated.
- 1984
  - The Photothèque opens.
  - The Hilton Luxembourg hotel is built.
  - Eurovision Song Contest 1984 held.
- 1991 - BGL Luxembourg Open tennis tournament begins.
- 1993 - Am Tunnel art gallery opens.
- 1994
  - Arboretum Kirchberg opens.
  - European Investment Fund headquartered in city.
- 1995
  - City designated a European Capital of Culture.
  - Den Atelier music venue opens.
- 1996
  - Luxembourg City History Museum founded.
  - Utopolis Kirchberg cinema multiplex (since renamed Kinepolis Kirchberg) and Casino Luxembourg open.
- 1997 - Foreign residents outnumber Luxembourgers in the city for the first time.
- 1999 - Paul Helminger (DP) becomes mayor.

== 21st century ==
- 2001
  - City website online (approximate date).
  - Lycée Aline Mayrisch established.
- 2002 - National Museum of History and Art building expands.
- 2004 - Football Club FC RM Hamm Benfica formed.
- 2005
  - Philharmonie Luxembourg concert hall opens.
  - Racing Football Club Union Luxembourg formed.
- 2006 - Grand Duke Jean Museum of Modern Art inaugurated.
- 2007 - The city is designated as European Capital of Culture for the second time.
- 2008
  - The Judiciary City is inaugurated.
  - The city's vel'oH! bikeshare system enters service.
- 2010 - Villeroy & Boch porcelain factory closes.
- 2011 - Xavier Bettel becomes mayor.
- 2012 - Population: 100,000.
- 2013 - Lydie Polfer becomes mayor for the second time
- 2015 - The Hamilius building complex and bus station is demolished, leading to a restructuring of the city's bus network.
- 2016 - The Pfaffenthal Panoramic Elevator is inaugurated.
- 2017 - Line T1 of the Luxembourg City tramway opens, alongside Pfaffenthal-Kirchberg station and the Pfaffenthal-Kirchberg funicular.
- 2019 - The National Library of Luxembourg's new site on the Kirchberg opens.
- 2020 - Public transport is made free in Luxembourg City alongside the rest of the country.
- 2021
  - Population: 125,000.
  - The Stade de Luxembourg is inaugurated, replacing the Stade Josy Barthel as Luxembourg's national stadium.

== See also ==
- Districts of Luxembourg City
- List of mayors of Luxembourg City
- History of Luxembourg (country)
- Years in Luxembourg (country)

== Bibliography ==
- Thomas Nugent (1749), "Luxemburg", The Grand Tour, vol. 1: Netherlands, London: S. Birt, hdl:2027/mdp.39015030762598
- "Luxemburg". Gazetteer of the Netherlands. London: G.G. and J. Robinson. 1794.
- Abraham Rees (1819), "Luxemburg, a city of France", The Cyclopaedia, London: Longman, Hurst, Rees, Orme & Brown, hdl:2027/uc2.ark:/13960/t5n87hg3d
- "Luxemburg". Galignani's Traveller's Guide through Holland and Belgium (4th ed.). Paris: A. and W. Galignani. 1822. hdl:2027/njp.32101073846667.
- "Luxemburg", Hand-Book for Travellers on the Continent (2nd ed.), London: John Murray, 1838, OCLC 2030550
- W. Pembroke Fetridge (1885), "Luxembourg", Harper's Hand-book for Travellers in Europe and the East, New York: Harper & Brothers
- "Luxemburg, the capital of the grand-duchy". Chambers's Encyclopaedia. London. 1901. hdl:2027/uc2.ark:/13960/t7zk5ms79 – via HathiTrust.
- "Luxembourg", Belgium and Holland, including the Grand-Duchy of Luxembourg, Leipzig: Karl Baedeker, 1910, OCLC 397759
- "Luxemburg (city)" . Encyclopædia Britannica. Vol. 17 (11th ed.). 1910. p. 146.
- "Luxembourg", Traveller's Handbook for Belgium and the Ardennes, London: T. Cook & Son, 1921
- Pit Pé́porté; et al. (2010), Inventing Luxembourg: representations of the past, space and language from the nineteenth to the twenty-first century, Leiden: Brill, ISBN 9789004181762, OCLC 467360786, OL 24521241M, 9004181768
