= Pfaffenthal explosion =

1976 gasoline explosions in Pfaffenthal, Luxembourg

- First responders attending the scene of the explosion
- Date: 30 May 1976
- Time: 21:40
- Location: Pfaffenthal, Luxembourg City; 49°36′57″N 6°7′54″E
- Cause: Negligent release of 10,000-20,000 liters (Note: Initial press accounts variously put the quantity at 10,000 or 20,000 liters; in 1981, the police tribunal of Luxembourg City concluded that it was 11,000 liters.) of gasoline into an underground sewer
- Deaths: 3
- Injuries: 20–25
- Property damage: c. 20 houses destroyed or demolished due to extensive damage
- Displaced: c. 93 people displaced permanently

In the evening of 30 May 1976, a series of explosions tore through a block of houses in Pfaffenthal, a district of Luxembourg City, Luxembourg. Three residents were killed, including a four-year-old child, and between 20 and 25 people were injured. The explosion, labelled by Tageblatt at the time as "the worst disaster since the end of the war", (Note: German: Das schwerste Unglück seit Kriegsende) further destroyed or caused irreparable damage to around 20 houses, rendering nearly 100 people homeless.

While residents initially suspected the explosion to have been caused by gas, investigators found that earlier that day, an inexperienced truck driver at a depot in Cessange had mistakenly released large quantities of gasoline into a sewer. The gasoline then flowed towards Pfaffenthal, where its fumes rose into the neighbourhood's poorly insulated cellars and were ignited, triggering the explosion.

In 1982, three people were held responsible for the explosion by Luxembourg's court of appeals, and sentenced to pay fines and damages to implicated insurance companies. A social housing development was built in place of the demolished block, being completed in 1986, a decade after the incident.

== Background ==
Pfaffenthal is one of 24 districts of Luxembourg City, situated in a narrow part of the Alzette valley, downstream from Clausen and below the Ville-Haute, the city's old town. From the 19th century onwards, the part of the district located on the left bank of the Alzette, around the Béinchen bridge, became known as a working-class neighbourhood with a significant immigrant population drawn by affordable housing. The district's population declined strongly following the Second World War, down to about 1,500 in the 1970s and 1980s. As of 1978, 41% of Pfaffenthal residents were immigrants, compared to 24% for the city as a whole, and Portuguese immigrants in particular made up a sizeable proportion of the neighbourhood's population.

In the 1970s, Pfaffenthal homes were often small and cramped, with extremely basic amenities. Robert Conrad, a former head of the city's housing department, later described these conditions as "the worst in the entire city" and "almost like in the Middle Ages". (Note: German: die Schlechteste in der ganzen Stadt (...) fast noch so wie im Mittelalter) For much of the 20th century, the City pursued a hygienist policy in the neighbourhood, buying up and demolishing a number of unsanitary homes. Consequently, part of the block where the explosion would take place, located between the Alzette, the Béinchen bridge, Rue Laurent Menager and Rue du Pont, close to where the Pfaffenthal Panoramic Elevator stands today, already stood vacant.

Gas explosions and fires were not uncommon in the neighbourhood. On 21 September 1973, for instance, a strong explosion in the courtyard of a building on Rue Laurent Menager injured four and caused a large fire. This was reportedly the third fire within three years.

== Explosion ==
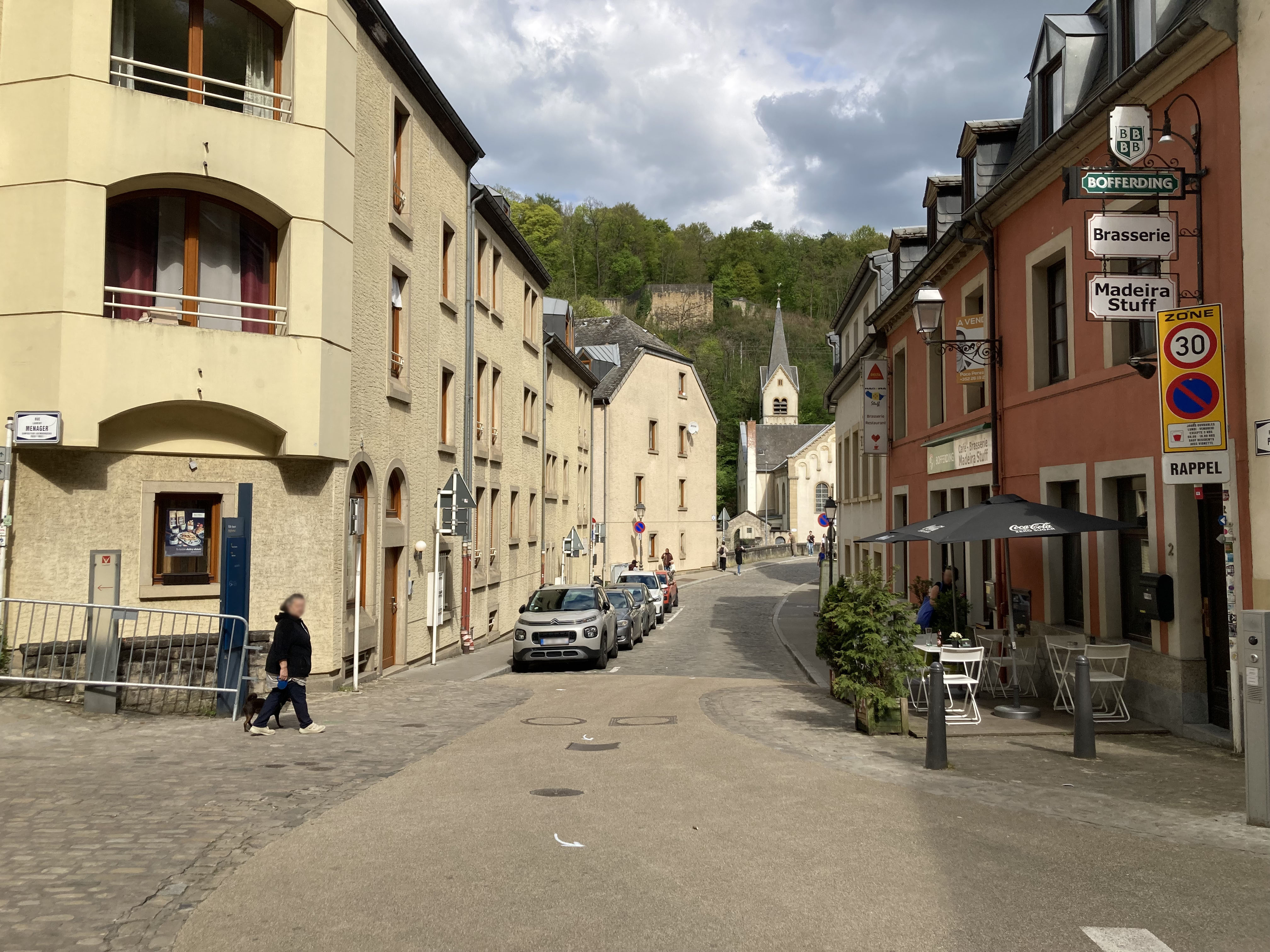
Rue du Pont pictured in 2026

On 30 May 1976, at 21:20, residents at 45, Rue Laurent Menager called the city's gasworks after noticing a suspicious gas smell. At 21:30, a member of the gasworks emergency personnel arrived at the scene, and determined that the smell could not have been coming from the city gasworks, as pipes were intact.

Shortly thereafter, around 21:40, a first explosion occurred at number 3, Rue du Pont, and the adjacent Café du Pont. The house at number 3 collapsed almost entirely, killing a woman and a child who were buried under the rubble, with a man left hanging by a window, his legs trapped by rubble. This first explosion caused many residents to run out of their homes, which, alongside the fact that many others had been out at neighbourhood cafés, is thought to have limited the death toll. Emergency services, which were alerted at 21:56, rushed to the scene, but around 22:10, as the man stuck in the window was being rescued, a second explosion took place, described as "far more devastating" than the first (Note: German: weitaus verheerender eingestuft als die erste) and which sent several manhole covers flying into the air. Using a megaphone, a fire chief urged people to evacuate the area, potentially preventing further victims. In total, about a half dozen explosions, likely caused by fire interacting with gas, followed the first one.

Over 100 emergency personnel attended the scene, including paramedics with a "fleet of ambulances", (Note: German: einer gesamten Flotte von Ambulanzen) professional fire brigades, Grand Ducal Police, Grand Ducal Gendarmerie, Luxembourg Armed Forces, Red Cross and Protection Civile personnel, with teams from the city aided by backup from Lintgen, Mamer and Bettembourg. Some firemen later recalled attending the scene for as long as 29 hours straight. As the smell of gas could be sensed as far downstream as Eich and Weimerskirch, the supply was cut in a number of surrounding streets and a light-foam extract was injected into shafts in order to prevent further explosions. In the late hours of the night, Luxembourg City mayor Colette Flesch and Internal Affairs minister Jos Wohlfart arrived at the scene to assess the extent of the explosions. The next day, in an official statement to the communal council and after having promised speedy compensation for victims, Flesch described the event as "the city's worst catastrophe in post-war years". (Note: German: die schwerste Katastrophe der Stadt in den Nachkriegsjahren)

== Casualties and aftermath ==
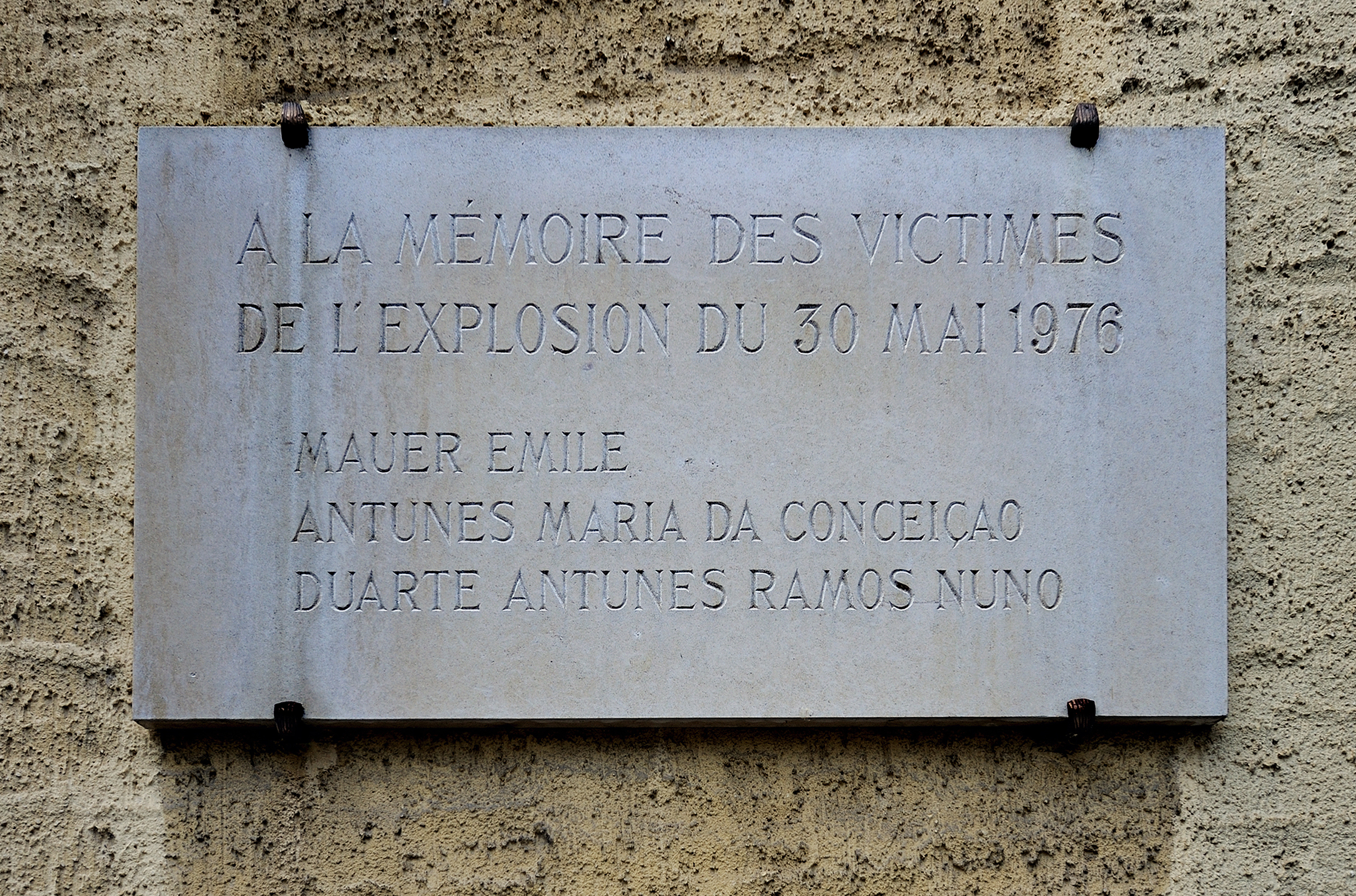
Plaque commemorating the victims of the explosion at 3, Rue du Pont, the address where the first explosion took place

Three people were killed by the explosion, with their bodies found in the rubble of houses number 1 and 3 at Rue du Pont by 2 am on 31 May. These victims were 36-year old Luxembourger Emile "Mulles" Mauer of Rumelange, 35-year old Portuguese Maria Da Conceição Antunes, a native of Torres Vedras, and her four-year-old son (Note: News sources have frequently referred to the child victim as a girl; however, Nuno is a male given name, and a reader's letter from Nuno's father published on 22 December 1976 refers to the child as his son.) Nuno Duarte Antunes Ramos.

Between 20 and 25 people were injured in the incident, two of whom severely, and treated at Eich Clinic, some suffering from severe fractures, burns or gas poisoning. Among the injured were three firemen, one of whom was hit in the head by a flying manhole cover, as well as a five-year-old girl who was found alive in the rubble after 7 hours.

Various accounts estimate that between 150 and 200 affected residents, those who lived in houses located along Rue du Pont and Rue Laurent Menager, were displaced in the immediate aftermath of the catastrophe. All were entitled to an indefinitely renewable "victim's certificate", which granted them temporary accommodation in a number of structures, and support from the city's social services. Most, as many as 93 on the first night, were housed in the nearby youth hostel, while others were given shelter in a number of other structures in Pfaffenthal, other parts of the city and Esch-sur-Alzette. Within a week, residents of all but three of the houses on Rue Laurent Menager were allowed to return to their homes, as these had been deemed habitable by experts. A total of 93 people lost their home indefinitely.

Historian Michel Pauly has characterised the handling of the many displaced Portuguese residents as troubled. In a 2022 book on the history of Luxembourg City, he wrote that no interpreter was present, and that the plan to house them at a military centre in Diekirch, 30 km (19 mi) away, left many sleeping in a city park, since few owned cars.

== Investigation and trial ==
=== Initial investigation of the causes ===
The initial trial took place at the Luxembourg City police tribunal, now housed within the Judiciary City.

The cause of the explosion was not immediately apparent. Reportedly, in the week following the catastrophe, a number of Pfaffenthal residents maintained the belief that it had been caused by natural gas. By 31 May, the lead of a potential gasoline leak was explored, as a team of experts discovered the presence of thousands of liters of gasoline at the Beggen wastewater treatment plant, about 3.8 km (2.4 mi) north. A call for witnesses was published the next day, asking anyone who had noticed a gasoline smell in the area on 30 May, or who had information about suspicious fuel deliveries on 29 or 30 May, to contact authorities.

On 4 June, a teletype release from the police information service, first circulated by Le Républicain Lorrain, revealed the conclusions reached the previous day by an in-depth inquiry from police and forensic experts. In the evening of 30 May, at a depot of petroleum company Elf in Cessange, an inexperienced truck driver employed by transportation company Intralux had intended to deliver 10,000 to 20,000 liters of gasoline, left over from a delivery the previous day, into an underground reserve tank he had never previously used. Unknowingly, he instead discharged the load into a kind of cistern known as an oil separator, from which it overflowed into the sewer system. The gasoline then flowed towards Pfaffenthal, one of the lowest points in the city, and its fumes entered cellars, many of which lacked plumbing traps, where they accumulated. A spark, reportedly coming from a refrigerator compressor, then ignited the fumes and the gasoline, causing the first explosion.

It was reported that the driver responsible for the leak turned himself in and was questioned, but not arrested, as he had only worked for the company for a few weeks and was unfamiliar with the systems at the facility.

=== 1981–1982 trial ===
The trial pertaining to the explosion began before the police tribunal of Luxembourg City on 25 March 1981. Three people stood accused: Remy Faber, the delivery driver responsible for the gasoline release, and brothers Ernest and Marcel Ehlinger, who were the directors of Elf and Intralux respectively at the time of the explosion. The key question of the trial was whether the explosion had been caused by gasoline fumes, as had notably been concluded by police in the days following the catastrophe, or by a gas leak, as the defense lawyers argued. After hearing a number of expert witnesses, the court upheld the gasoline fumes theory; in July, it acquitted Faber and Marcel Ehlinger, sentencing Ernest Ehlinger to a suspended sentence of 8 months in prison as well as a 100,000 LUF fine, and ordered him to pay 5 million LUF in damages to three insurance companies.

However, the decision was appealed, and reviewed on 18 June 1982 by the Court of Appeals of Luxembourg. All three defendants were recognised as being solely and jointly responsible for the consequences of the explosion, while the owners of the destroyed homes would bear no responsibility, as the absence of plumbing traps in the neighbourhood's homes did not constitute negligence on their part. The defendants were condemned to jointly pay the 5 million LUF of damages to insurance companies, as well as 700,000 LUF of legal fees.

== Reconstruction ==
=== Planning ===
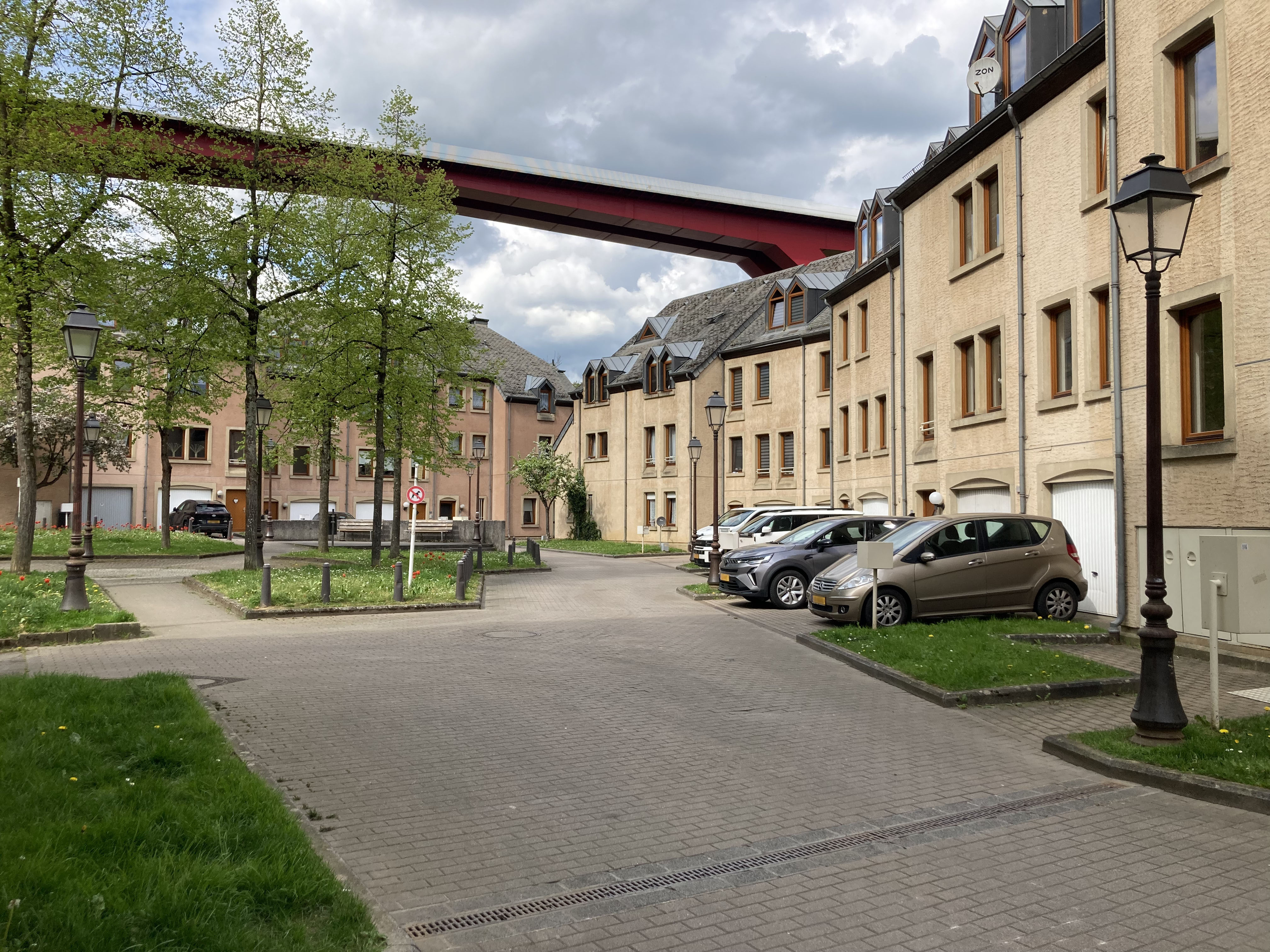
The Beim Béinchen housing development, built in place of the demolished housing block, viewed from Rue du Pont

At least 20 houses were damaged by the explosion, and while most remained standing thereafter, the entire block was eventually demolished. Houses number 1 and 3 on Rue du Pont were demolished immediately, while the remaining houses, which were considered uninhabitable or unsalvageable, were torn down starting on 15 June.

The day following the catastrophe, mayor Flesch declared that the reconstruction of Pfaffenthal was an "absolute priority"; (Note: German: absoluter Priorität) a master plan for reconstruction was approved in September 1976. While almost all of the terrain was already owned by the City of Luxembourg, Flesch stated in 1978 that timing for the project was "difficult to predict". (Note: German: Das Timing sei schwer vorauszusagen)

In June 1978, an architectural design competition was launched, with architects Fritsch, Herr and Huybenrechts announced as its winners in October of the same year. Their design concept, which originated in the Netherlands, centered on a courtyard overlooked by surrounding houses that would architecturally blend with the rest of the neighbourhood, comprising 39 homes for a total of around 120 residents.

=== Construction and rehousing ===
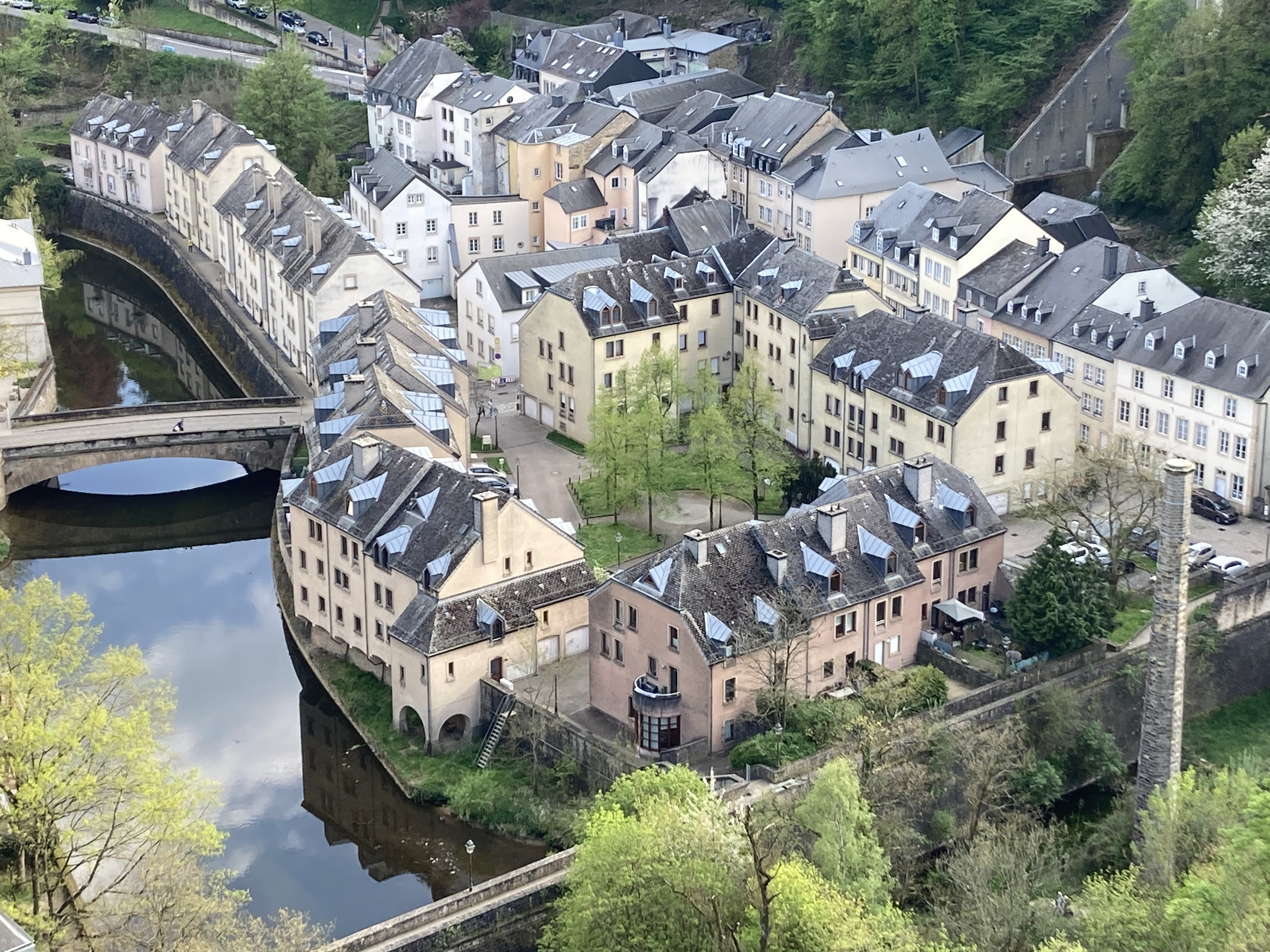
Beim Béinchen seen from the Grand Duchess Charlotte Bridge, which straddles Pfaffenthal

The construction permit for the final version of the project was approved in August 1982, now comprising 12 single-family homes, 17 apartments, 4 studio apartments, one café, one business and one community hall, at a cost of 230 million LUF. The groundbreaking for the housing development, which became known as "beim Béinchen" or "um Béinchen" after the nearby bridge, took place on 25 February 1983 in the presence of mayor Lydie Polfer. Construction took just over three years, and the dedication ceremony, during which Polfer unveiled a plaque dedicated to the victims of the explosion, took place on 20 September 1986, a full decade after the catastrophe.

All of the homes were made available as social housing, benefitting from a new legal status adopted in 1979. Only 8 of the families that had lived in the destroyed block ended up rehoused in the new project, as most had long found permanent housing elsewhere. Jean-André Stammet, the general secretary of Pfaffenthal's local advocacy syndicate, has characterised this turnover as a "sociological recomposition of the neighbourhood", citing the "[destruction] of its sociological fabric" (Note: French: une nouvelle recomposition sociale du quartier (...) [l'explosion] a détruit son tissu sociologique.) as a consequence of the explosion.

== Works cited ==
- SILPS (2023). Kanner o Kanner : eng Hymne op eng eenzegaarteg Ënnerstad (in Luxembourgish) (2nd ed.). Luxembourg City: Saint-Paul. ISBN 978-99959-0-852-2.
- Théato, Fernand [in Luxembourgish] (1985). "Die unglaubwürdige Geschichte des "Quartier Béinchen" : oder. Warum es so lange dauerte". Laurent Menager (in German). Luxembourg City: Chorale Sang a Klang Pafendall. pp. 187–200.
