= Kirchberg, Luxembourg =

District of Luxembourg City, Luxembourg

Kirchberg Kierchbierg (Luxembourgish)
- District
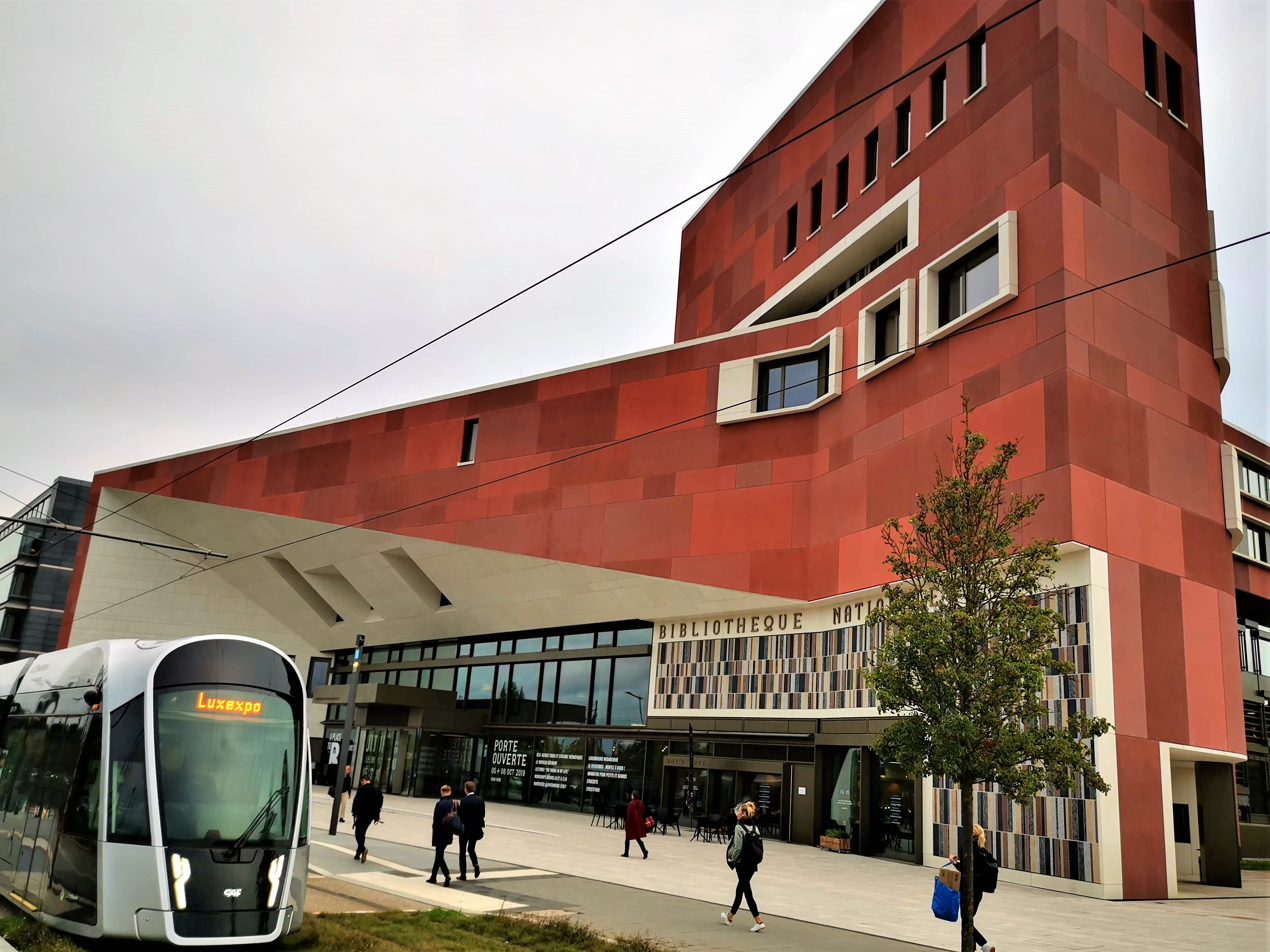
- General view Philharmonie Luxembourg European Court of Justice MUDAM National Library of Luxembourg

- Kirchberg is one of 24 districts in Luxembourg City
- Coordinates: 49.627869°N 6.153422°E
- Country: Luxembourg
- Commune: Luxembourg City

Area
  - Total: 3.3684 km^{2} (1.3005 sq mi)

Population (31 December 2025)
  - Total: 10,982
  - Density: 3,260.3/km^{2} (8,444.1/sq mi)

Nationality
  - Luxembourgish: 25.50%
  - Other: 74.50%
- Website: Kirchberg Plateau

Kirchberg (German pronunciation: [ˈkɪʁçbɛʁk]; Luxembourgish: Kierchbierg, pronounced [kiːɐ̯ɕˈbiːɐ̯ɕ]; lit. 'church hill') is a district in north-eastern Luxembourg City, in southern Luxembourg. It consists of a plateau overlooking the north-east of the historical city center, Ville Haute, connected to the rest of the elevated city by the Grand Duchess Charlotte Bridge, which spans the Pfaffenthal valley. It is often referred to, in reference to the geographical feature it inhabits, as the Kirchberg plateau by Luxembourgish residents. Kirchberg is the predominant location of the European Union institutions and bodies based within Luxembourg, and is sometimes used as a metonym for the EU's judiciary, which occupies the district. It is thus the central business district of Luxembourg.

== History ==
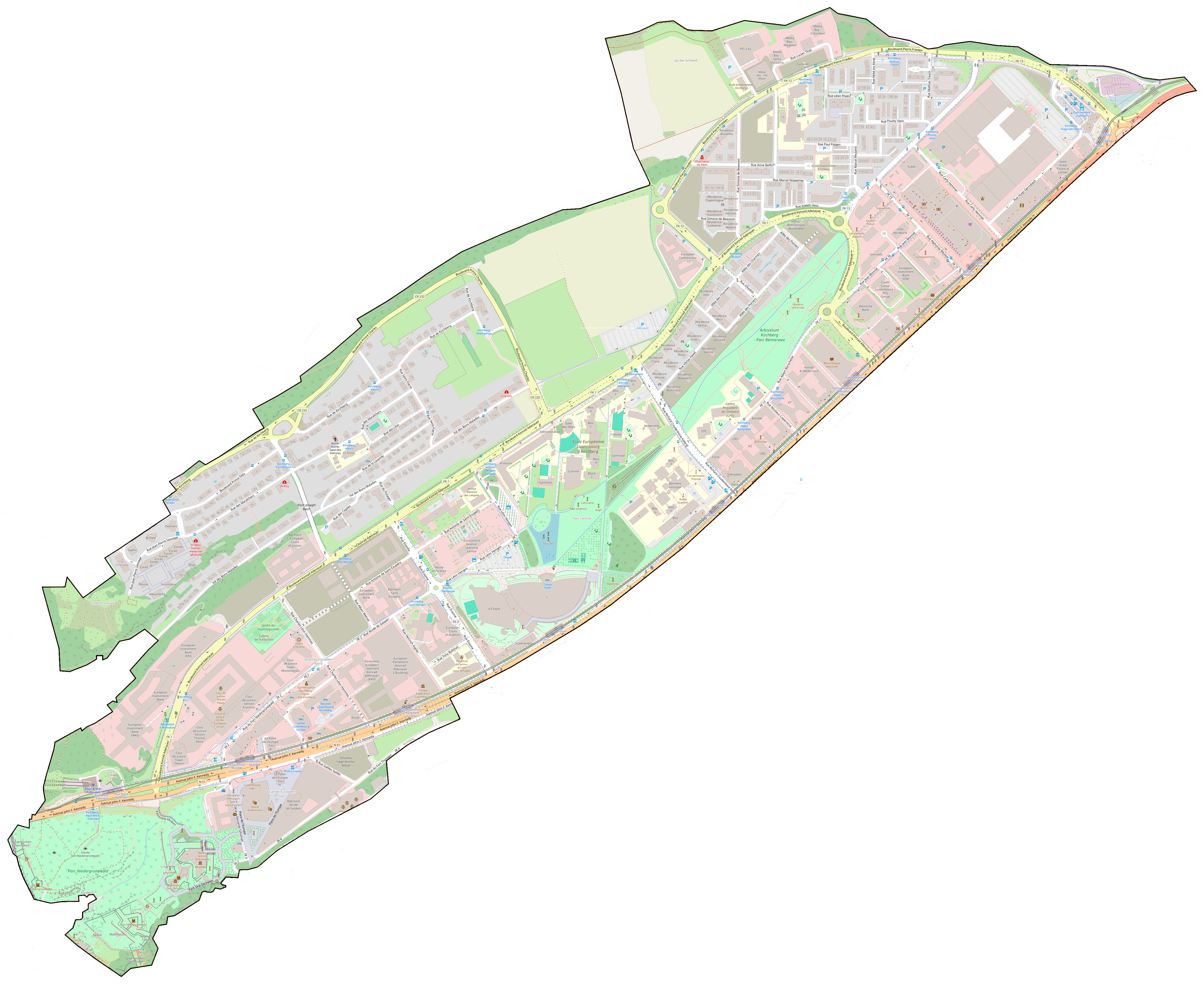
Detailed map of Kirchberg

=== Etymology ===
The most common explanation for the etymology of the name Kirchberg is that of a Germanic origin. Kirchberg, as well as Neudorf, belonged to the parish of Weimerskirch. As Neudorf did not have its own church for a long time, on Sundays its inhabitants had to climb the hill between them and Weimerskirch to get to the church there. Thus, according to this theory, the "Berg zur Kirche" ("hill to the church") became the "Kirchberg", the church hill.

This theory is disputed by historian Jean Thoma, who points to the fact that Neudorf was only settled around 1795, nearly 30 years after a cadastral register already made mention of land on the Kirchberg. Thoma cites Jean-Paul Loos, who claims that in the case of Kirchberg, the particle 'Kirch' derives from the Latin scara, a kind of garrison posted at regular intervals along Roman roads, while 'berg' comes for the Celtic veredus, meaning a postal relay station. Thus, in Loos's explanation, 'Kirchberg' means "the postal relay station by the garrison".

=== Early history ===
Although Kirchberg is first mentioned in historical records in 1222, one may assume there was an earlier settlement there, due to its useful location close to the Roman road from Reims to Trier. Little now remains of this Kiemwee (Roman road), but around 1900 it was still a popular walking destination for the city's inhabitants. In that year, the historian Nicolas van Werveke declared in a speech: "Who among us does not know the Kiem of Grünewald, [...] it is so well preserved on the whole stretch of the plateau, to the point where it leaves the forest, that one may boldly consider this part of the road one of the best-preserved of Gaul."

The isolated elevated position of the plateau made it an important defensive position and led to the 1732 construction of Forts Thüngen and Olizy in southwestern Kirchberg, as part of Luxembourg's imposing fortifications. Its strategic importance was reaffirmed with several expansions to their battlements. However, much of Luxembourg's fortifications were destroyed following the 1867 Treaty of London. In 1875, the Parish Church of Our Lady, Refuge of the Sick (Note: The Parish Church of Our Lady, Refuge of the Sick is now grouped with other parishes in the pastoral community of Weimerskirch. It was the location of the only regular celebration authorised by the Archdiocese of Mass of the Roman Rite in its 1962 version (Tridentine Mass) until October 2014 when it was moved to the Church of St. Cunegonde`s in the nearby Luxembourg City district of Clausen.), was built to serve a small farming community that had established themselves in central Kirchberg.

The Schuman building was the first Chamber built specifically for the European Parliament

Kirchberg remained largely undeveloped until the post-war period in the latter half of the 20th century, when its cheap land, and proximity to the city provided an attractive locality as the seat of various institutions of the European Communities - the forerunner to today's European Union. The failure of the six founding states of the European Coal and Steel Community (ECSC) to agree on a single basis for its institutions' location, had led to Luxembourg becoming its provisional seat upon the ECSC's creation in 1952. However, with the development of the European Economic Community and the European Atomic Energy Community, other cities, namely Brussels and Strasbourg, had successfully bid for their institutions. Discussions leading up to the 1965 Merger Treaty, which merged the governing institutions of the three communities, focused on resolving the deadlock in finding a single basis for the three communities' institutions. The Luxembourg government, seeking to retain and further attract the communities' institutions, commissioned the construction of the Grand Duchess Charlotte Bridge, spanning the Pffafenthal valley, to connect the Kirchberg plateau directly with Limpertsberg, and the rest of the elevated city, opening up its cheap land for development for the communities. The Luxembourg government's efforts were successful and today Luxembourg is considered one of the EU's three de facto capitals, retaining several institutions, most importantly, the Court of Justice of the European Union.

=== Contemporary developments ===
The development of the European district acted as a catalyst for the urbanisation of Kirchberg, promoted by the government initiative, the Fonds Kirchberg. The architecture of the Kirchberg plateau is notably modern.

The major components of Kirchberg's urbanisation were drawn up by French architect Pierre Vago, with its central axis being the 3.5 km long Avenue John Fitzgerald Kennedy stretching from the Grand Duchess Charlotte Bridge in southwest Kirchberg to the edge of the Grünewald forest on the north-eastern border. The avenue was beautified from its original inception as an expressway into a tree-lined pedestrian-and-cycle-friendly thoroughfare, with separated tram and bus lanes. The Kirchberg campus of the University of Luxembourg is located midway along this avenue, in proximity to, since September 2019, the National Library of Luxembourg. A number of glass and steel edifices of commercial, and financial institutions spans from central to north eastern Kirchberg, where the Kirchberg Hospital is located.

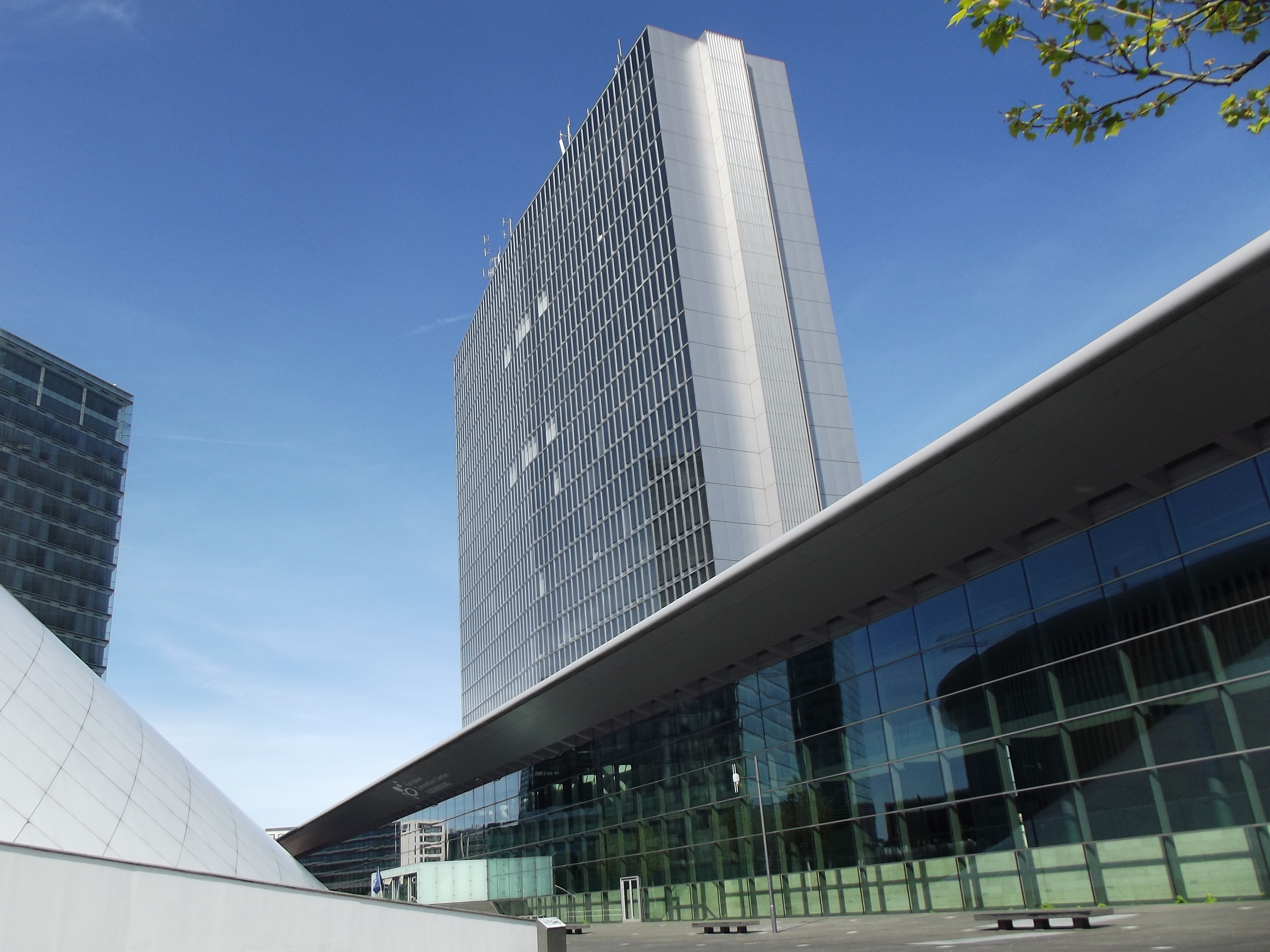
Alcide De Gasperi building

Kirchberg has developed into an important cultural hub. The partially reconstructed Fort Thüngen, listed along with the rest of the former Fortress of Luxembourg, as a UNESCO World Heritage Site, hosts the Mudam, a museum of modern art opened in 2006. Designed by I. M. Pei, it displays works by some of the world's most notable modern artists. In close proximity, adjacent to one of the European Parliament's original plenary chambers, is the Philharmonie, Luxembourg's national concert hall. The grand auditorium seats over 1,500 people. On the eastern edge of the European district, Luxembourg's National Sports and Culture Centre, d'Coque arena contains an Olympic-sized swimming pool and the country's largest indoor arena with seating for 8,300 spectators.

In north-eastern Kirchberg, the mixed-use complex of the Kirchberg District Centre contains both the offices of the European Commission's statistics body (Note: The office space of the complex is referred to collectively as the "Joseph Bech building"), Eurostat, and an Auchan hypermarket and shopping mall. Bordering the complex are the cinema multiplex, Kinepolis Kirchberg, and Luxembourg's national exposition centre, Luxexpo The Box.

Today, south-western Kirchberg is dominated by the EU institutions and agencies that were the key to its development. This includes the Court of Justice of the European Union, the Court of Auditors, the European Public Prosecutor's Office, parts of the European Commission, the Secretariat of the European Parliament, and the European Investment Bank. Additionally, the European School, Luxembourg I provides an education to the children of staff working within the EU bodies. Kirchberg's association with the Court of Justice of the European Union, in particular, has led to it becoming a metonym for the institution. (Note: See: Used interchangeably with "Luxembourg", referring to the city.)

As of 31 December 2025, Kirchberg has a population of 10,982 inhabitants, with just over a quarter possessing Luxembourgish nationality.

== Public transport ==
Plans to provide Kirchberg with a more direct connection to national and international heavy rail links were realized in December 2017, with the opening of a funicular, on the southern edge of the plateau, in proximity to the European district, which provides access to a newly constructed station located in the bordering Pfaffenthal valley below. Connecting the funicular station, a new tram line was opened which, since March 2025, runs from Luxembourg Airport, via its depot in northern Kirchberg, down Avenue J.F.K, across the Grand Duchess Charlotte Bridge, and on to the old town in Ville Haute, before terminating in the Cloche d'Or business district in the south of the city via, the central station.

In northern Kirchberg, between Luxexpo and the new tram depot, a major new transport hub with 10 bus platforms, a tram stop and a five-storey car park was completed in May 2022.

The National Mobility Plan 2035 details a possible further tram extension in Kirchberg that would split from the existing line at Luxexpo, serving the Kiem and upcoming Laangfur urban development, as well as the CJEU, before rejoining the existing line via Boulevard Konrad Adenauer.

== Microclimate ==
Like Luxembourg City, Kirchberg has a general oceanic climate (Köppen: Cfb), marked by high precipitation, particularly in late spring. However, the slope and height of the area accounts for occasional lower temperatures (up to 1° below Luxembourg City), more frequent fog and enhanced precipitation of both rain and snow.

== See also ==
- European Parliament in Luxembourg
- Institutional seats of the European Union
- Quarters of Luxembourg City
