= Trams in Luxembourg City =

Luxembourg City tramway
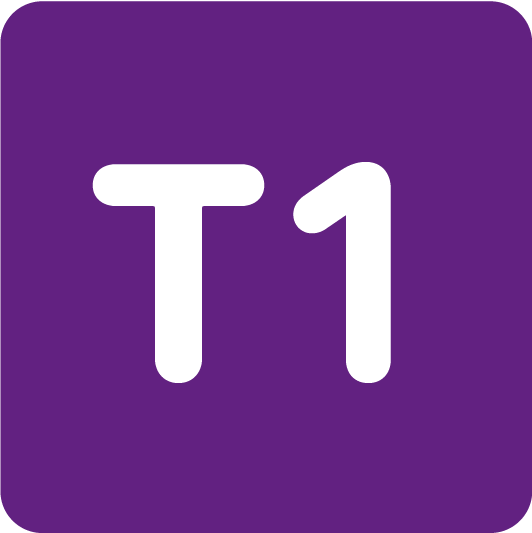

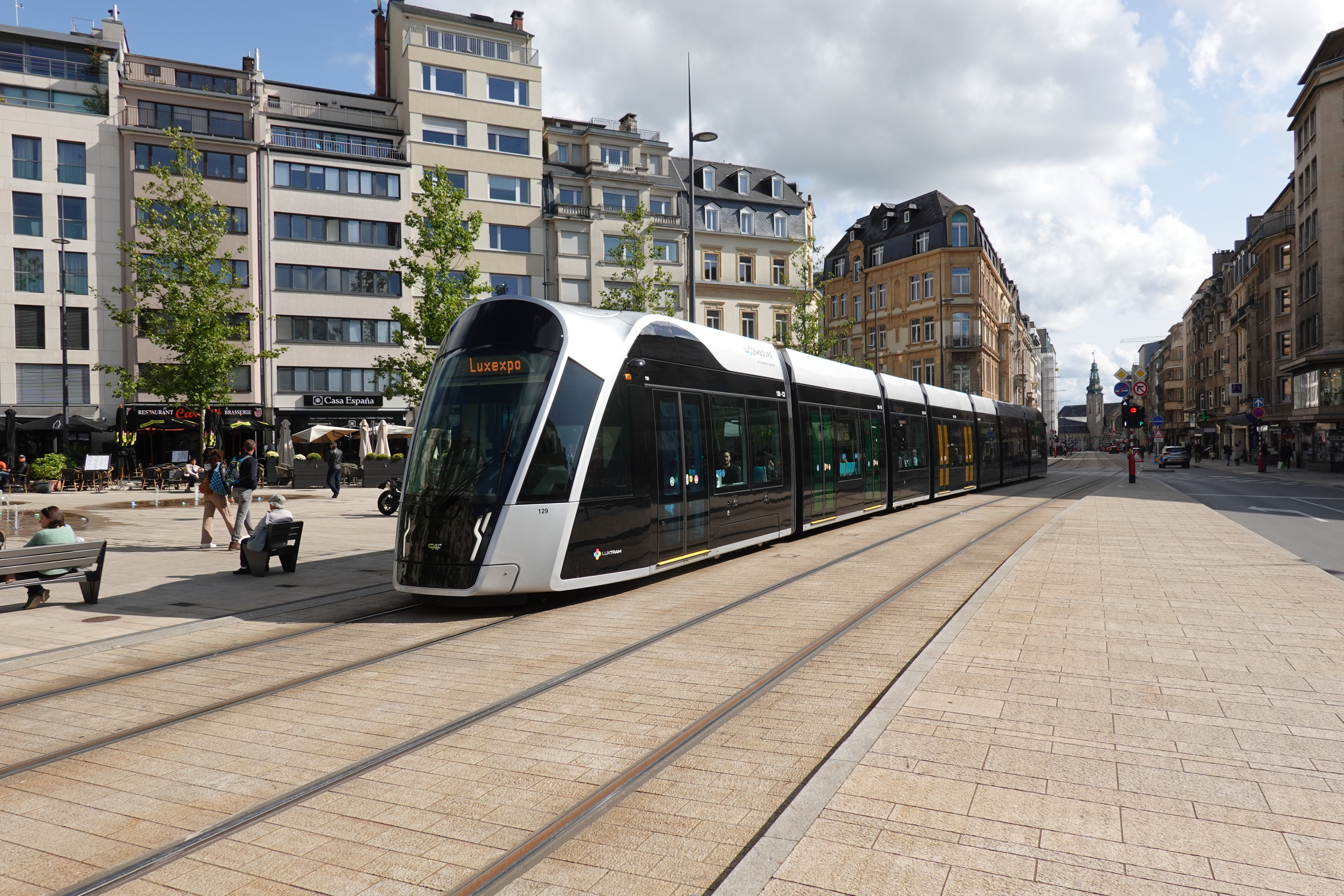
- A tramway at Place de Paris station in the Gare district.

- System diagram

Overview
- Native name: Stater Tram; Tramway de Luxembourg; Straßenbahn Luxemburg
- Locale: Luxembourg City, Luxembourg
- Transit type: Tram
- Number of lines: 1
- Number of stations: 24
- Annual ridership: 31.7 million

Operation
- Began operation: 21 February 1875 (horse); 8 August 1908 (electric); 10 December 2017 (second generation)
- Ended operation: 5 September 1964 (first generation)
- Operators: Tramways électriques de la Ville de Luxembourg (1908-1964); Luxtram (since 2017)
- Number of vehicles: 33

Technical
- System length: 16 km (9.9 mi)
- Track gauge: 1,435 mm (4 ft 8 1/2 in) standard gauge
- Electrification: 750 V DC Overhead line and batteries

The first generation of trams in Luxembourg City ran from 1875 to 1964, before they were withdrawn from service and the tramways removed. A second generation of trams began operational service in December 2017, along a new route, completed in March 2025, that runs from Luxembourg Airport in the north-east to the Cloche d'Or business district in Gasperich in the south, serving the new national stadium, via Howald, Pfaffenthal-Kirchberg and Luxembourg railway stations. Additional lines are planned for the network both within Luxembourg City, as well as extending to Strassen and Esch-sur-Alzette. Work has already begun on an extension of the existing Kirchberg segment, with preparatory construction starting in February 2025.

Trams have been free of charge since 29 February 2020, when all public transport in Luxembourg (buses, trams and trains) were made free at the point of use.

== Contemporary and future usage ==
=== T1 ===
The reintroduction of trams to Luxembourg's transport infrastructure began in January 2015, with the construction of a tram depot on the edge of the Grünewald Forest and the Kirchberg quarter, and the laying of the first tracks of the new Tram Line 1 (T1) in July 2016. Trams provided by the Spanish company CAF began trials on the first phase of the route in July 2017.

On 10 December 2017, the first phase of the route opened with trams running from the depot, along Avenue John F. Kennedy, past the European district, the location of many EU institutions, before terminating at the Grand Duchess Charlotte Bridge. Here, a new funicular railway was opened on the same date allowing passengers to descend to Pfaffenthal-Kirchberg railway station for access to national and international heavy rail services running through the Pfaffenthal valley.

The second phase opened on 27 July 2018, extending tram services across the Grand Duchess Charlotte Bridge to Place de l'Étoile in the Limpertsberg quarter.

Opening on 13 December 2020, the third phase saw the line extend into the historical Ville Haute quarter, across the Adolphe Bridge, along the Avenue de la Liberté, before terminating at Luxembourg railway station for interchanges between national and international heavy rail services. Work to widen and reinforce the Adolphe Bridge, first opened in 1903, to accommodate the tramway was completed in July 2017, with a new cycle and pedestrian lane suspended beneath the existing bridge.

The fourth phase, opening in September 2022, extended the line from the central station to Bonnevoie.

On 7 July 2024, the fifth phase extended the line southwestwards from Bonnevoie, via Howald railway station to the business district in Cloche d'Or, Gasperich, before terminating at Luxembourg's new national stadium.

The final phase of the route, completed on 2 March 2025, extended the line eastwards from the tram depot on the edge of Kirchberg to Senningerberg before terminating at Luxembourg Airport.

The completed line has 24 stations connected by 16 km (9.9 mi) of tracks, with a capacity of 10,000 passengers per hour in each direction.

=== Future lines ===
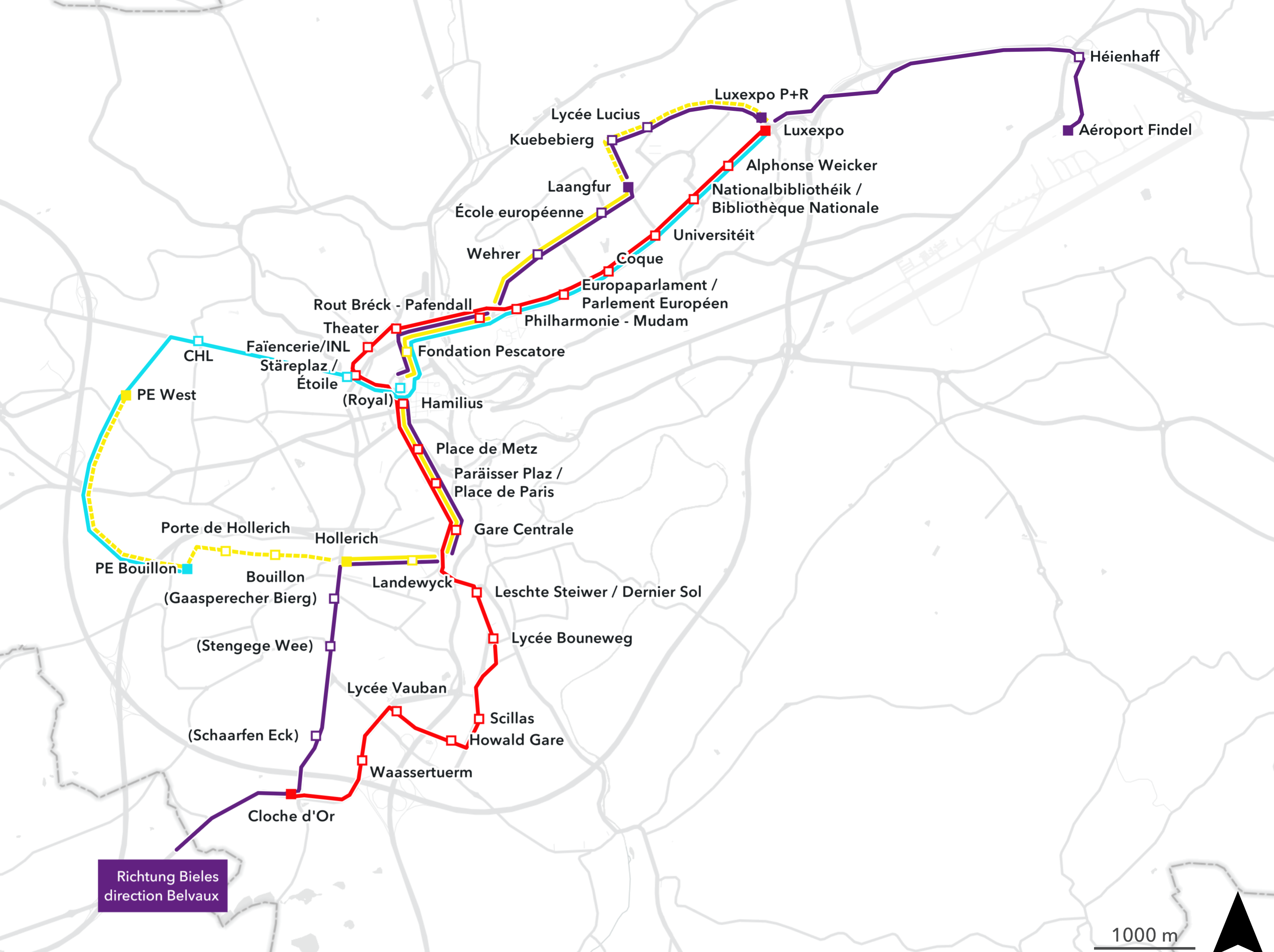
The future tram network in 2035 as outlined in the 2022 national mobility plan

In October 2020, the Minister for Mobility and Public Works, François Bausch, presented detailed plans of an initiative first announced in June 2018, for a future tramline, extending off the T1 line, alongside the A4 motorway to the north of Luxembourg's second most populous city, Esch-sur-Alzette, by 2028, and to the Belval district of the city, including the University of Luxembourg Belval campus, by 2035. Trams would be expected to reach speeds of up to 100 km/h (62 mph) when travelling through rural sections of the route.

In conjunction, plans were announced to expand the network, with the creation of additional lines connected to T1 within, and in proximity to, Luxembourg City, serving amongst other areas, the planned Laangfur residential district in Kirchberg, via Boulevard Konrad Adenauer, and also via a revamped Place de l'Étoile interchange and Route d'Arlon, Strassen. Works on the Kirchberg extension have already begun, with preparatory construction starting in February 2025. An initial extension between Avenue John F. Kennedy and Rue Richard Coudenhove-Kalergi is scheduled to open in September 2027, and will include two new stops. The first, "Commission européenne", which will serve the seat of two EU institutions — the Court of Justice of the European Union and the European Commission (through its new Jean Monnet 2 building, set to become the principal seat of its activities in Luxembourg) — as well as the seat of the European Investment Bank, an EU body. The second, "École europénne", will, as its name suggests, serve the European School, Luxembourg I.

=== Rolling stock ===
Twenty-one Spanish CAF Urbos100 trams were delivered in 2017, with a further twelve ordered in 2018. They are 45 m (147 ft 8 in) long, 2.65 m (8 ft 8 in) wide, 3.6 m (11 ft 10 in) high, with 75 seats and able to carry up to 422 passengers at a top speed of 70 km/h (43 mph). To cope with a 3.6 km (2.2 mi) gap in the 750V DC catenary between "Rout Bréck - Pafendall" tram stop in Kirchberg (about 160 m (520 ft) east of Grand Duchess Charlotte Bridge) and the central railway station, the trams use CAF's ACR system.

== Historical usage and museum ==
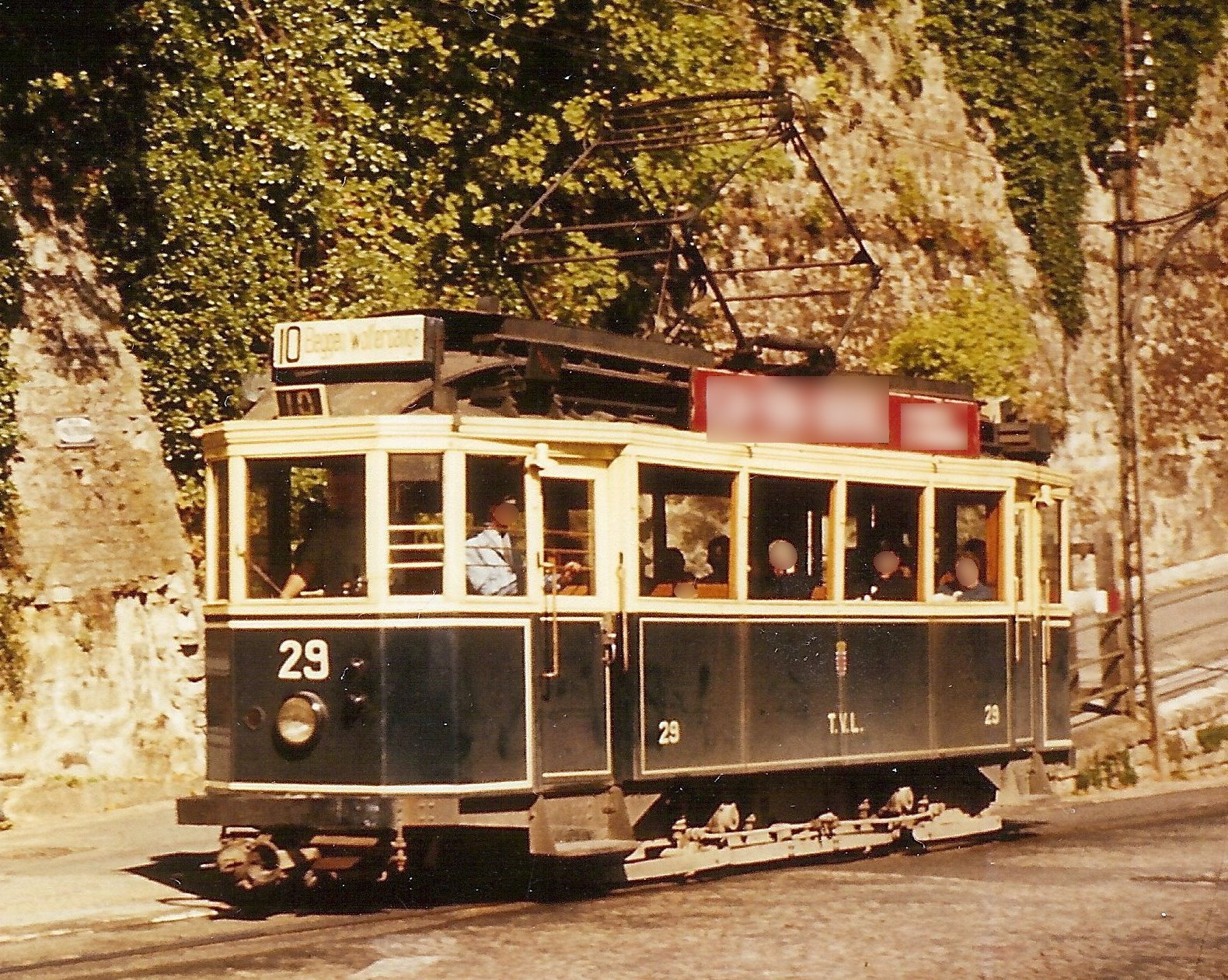
The last of the first generation of tramways in Luxembourg, seen here in 1964.

Luxembourg's first horse-drawn tram line began operations in 1875 running through Luxembourg City along a 10 km (6.2 mi) line. Electrification followed in 1908. The original track followed a route from Luxembourg railway station through the city centre to Limpertsberg. It was extended to various parts of the city until 1930 when the network covered 31 km (19 mi). Several lines were closed at the beginning of the 1960s as buses replaced the trams. The last tram ran on the line to Beggen on 5 September 1964. The country's other tram network Tramways Intercommunaux du Canton d'Esch served Esch-sur-Alzette and its surroundings from 1927 to 1956.

A number of historic trams can be seen at Luxembourg City's tram and bus museum located on Rue de Bouillon in Hollerich. In particular, the museum exhibits two electric trams, two tram coaches, and a replica of a horse tram. There are also numerous models and photographs.

== See also ==
- Transport in Luxembourg
- History of rail transport in Luxembourg
- Trams in Europe
