= Utopia Group =

Luxembourgish cinema chain

Utopia Group SA
- Industry: Entertainment
- Predecessors: Utopia SA; Polyfilm BV
- Founded: 2002; 24 years ago
- Headquarters: Luxembourg

The Utopia Group SA was a Luxembourgish cinema chain which owned and operated cinemas located in Belgium, France, Luxembourg, and the Netherlands. In 2015, its French, Luxembourg and Dutch operations were acquired by the Kinepolis Group. The Utopia Group's Belgian operations were bought by the French Union Générale Cinématographique (UGC), following a ruling against Kinepolis' bid by the Belgian competition authority.

Originally formed in 2002 as a result of a merger between Luxembourg's Utopia SA and the Dutch Polyfilm BV, the company operated 19 cinemas, predominantly in the Benelux region, under the brand name of "Utopolis", with its flagship cinema, Utopolis Kirchberg (now Kinepolis Kirchberg), based in Luxembourg City.

Whilst most of the Utopia Group's cinemas have been renamed following the changes in ownership, a tribute remains in the form of the "Utopia" cinema in the Limpertsberg district of Luxembourg City.
