= Pfaffenthal =

District of Luxembourg City, Luxembourg

Pfaffenthal Pafendall (Luxembourgish)
- District
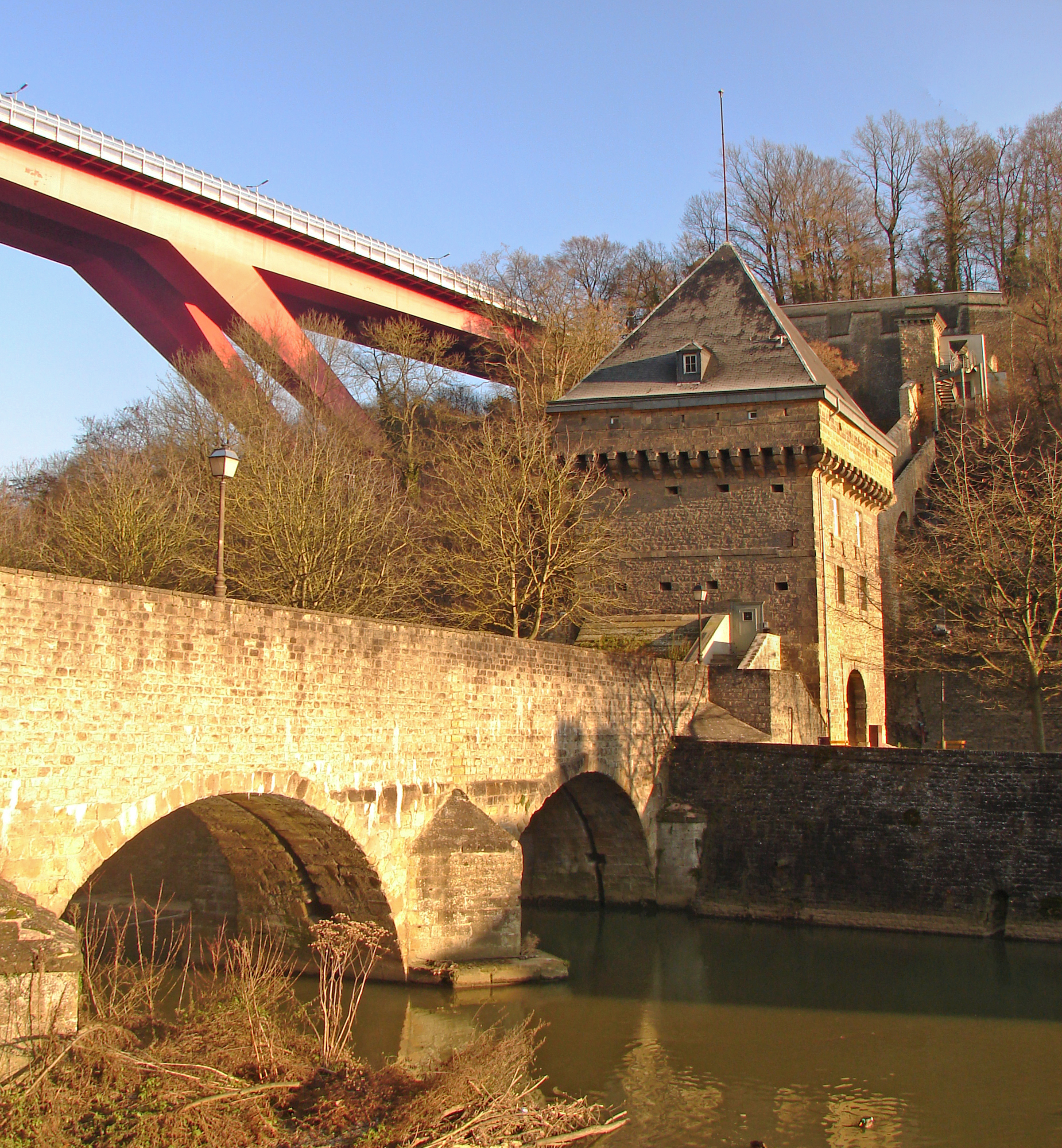
- Pfaffenthal and Grand Duchess Charlotte Bridge Saint Matthew's Church Béinchen bridge and Porte des bons-malades

- Pfaffenthal is one of 24 districts in Luxembourg City
- Coordinates: 49°36′57″N 6°07′55″E
- Country: Luxembourg
- Commune: Luxembourg City

Area
  - Total: 0.3752 km^{2} (0.1449 sq mi)

Population (31 December 2025)
  - Total: 1,380
  - Density: 3,680/km^{2} (9,530/sq mi)

Nationality
  - Luxembourgish: 39.06%
  - Other: 60.94%
- Website: Pfaffenthal

Pfaffenthal (German pronunciation: [ˈpfafn̩ˌtaːl]; Luxembourgish: Pafendall, pronounced [ˈpaːfəndɑl]) is a district in central Luxembourg City, in southern Luxembourg. The district owes its name to the German words Pfaffen, meaning monk, and Tal, meaning valley, as the area was once administered by the Benedictine Abbey in Altmünster. During the Middle Ages, this site was popular with craftsmen and artisans, who used the Alzette River to aid in their work. The site is a strategically important gateway to Luxembourg City, and was thus repeatedly fortified by successive rulers from about the fourteenth to eighteenth centuries.

Since December 2017, Pfaffenthal is served by the Pfaffenthal-Kirchberg railway station, which connects it to the district of Kirchberg above through the Pfaffenthal-Kirchberg funicular. It is further connected to Ville-Haute by the Pfaffenthal Panoramic Elevator, opened in July 2016, which links it to Édouard André Municipal Park.

As of 31 December 2025, the district has a population of 1,380 inhabitants, with 39.06% being of Luxembourgish nationality.

The following notable persons were born in Pfaffenthal:

- Laurent Menager (1835–1902), composer (also buried in the Sichenhaff graveyard)
- Charly Gaul (1932–2005), cyclist
- Elsy Jacobs (1933–1998), cyclist

== See also ==
- Pfaffenthal explosion
