= Pfaffenthal-Kirchberg railway station =

Rail station in Luxembourg City, Luxembourg

Pfaffenthal-Kirchberg
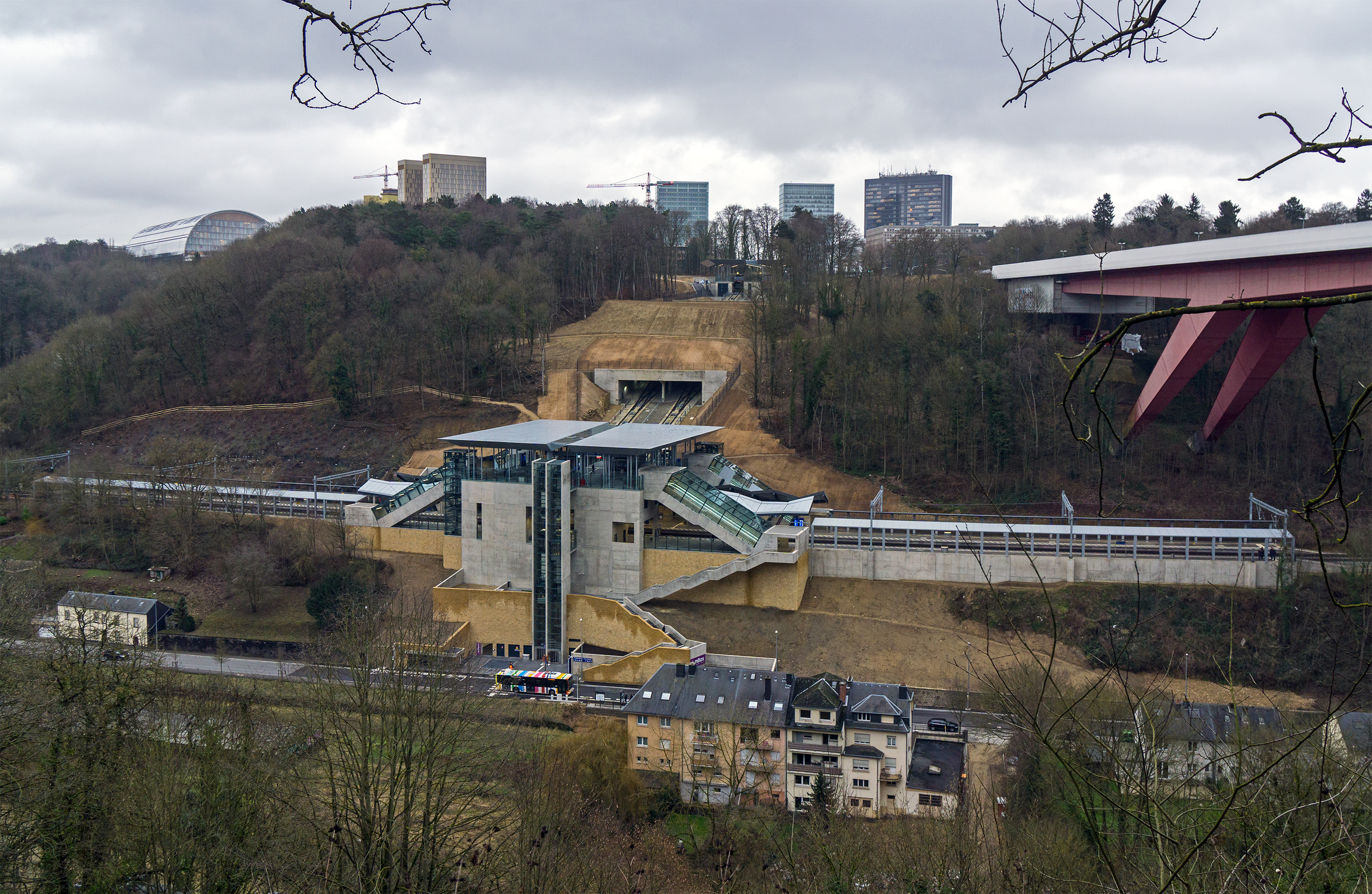

General information
- Location: Pfaffenthal entrance; rue St Mathieu L-2138 Luxembourg; Kirchberg entrance; Avenue J.F. Kennedy L-1855 Luxembourg
- Coordinates: 49°37′07″N 06°07′58″E
- Operator: CFL
- Line: CFL Line 10
- Platforms: 2
- Tracks: 2
- Train operators: CFL, SNCB
- Connections: LUXTRAM tram line T1; AVL bus lines 6, 12, 16, 18, 21, 23, 26, 32; RGTR bus lines 111, 112, 201, 211, 221, 811, 812

Construction
- Cycle facilities: Pfaffenthal entrance; 56 mBox cycle spaces; 44 cycle spaces; Kirchberg entrance; 56 mBox cycle spaces; 53 cycle spaces

Other information
- Website: CFL

History
- Opened: 10 December 2017

Passengers
- 2022: 1,183,133
- Rank: 8

Services
Preceding station	CFL	Following station
Luxembourg Terminus	Line 10	Dommeldange towards Troisvierges or Diekirch
Preceding station	NMBS/SNCB	Following station
Luxembourg Terminus	IC 33	Mersch towards Liers
Location

Pfaffenthal-Kirchberg railway station (Luxembourgish: Gare Pafendall-Kierchbierg; French: Gare de Pfaffenthal-Kirchberg; German: Bahnhof Pfaffenthal-Kirchberg) is a rail station on CFL Line 10, in the north of Luxembourg City which opened in December 2017. It is located above Rue Saint-Mathieu in the Pfaffenthal district, below the Grand Duchess Charlotte Bridge, overlooking the Alzette River. The Société Nationale des Chemins de Fer Luxembourgeois (CFL), the state-owned rail company, operates both the station and the associated funicular line, which links the station to the Kirchberg.

== History ==
Plans for the railway station, the funicular and the tramway projects were presented in September 2011 as part of the Luxembourgish government's wider sustainable mobility strategy. The aim was to reduce travel time for cross border and domestic rail commuters to the Kirchberg district of Luxembourg City, the location of many European Union (EU) institutions, including the Court of Justice of the European Union, and a growing commercial sector and resident population. Prior to completion, rail commuters to the Kirchberg plateau would have had to transfer at Luxembourg central station and make a further commute across the city. The pre-construction analysis took place between 2013 and 2014, with construction works spanning from March 2015, to late 2017. The station and the accompanying funicular line is estimated, at the time of construction, to have cost 96 million euros.

== Passenger information ==
=== Accessibility ===
Step-free access is available throughout the station. Elevators and escalators connect both platforms to the enclosed footbridge for interchanges, with further elevators providing access from the Rue St Mathieu entrance to platform 2 and the footbridge, and the funicular above platform 1 providing access from Avenue J.F. Kennedy to the station. Due to the decision not to charge passengers for use of the funicular, the funicular, via the station provides a step-free access route for pedestrians and cyclists from the Kirchberg plateau to the Pfaffenthal valley below.

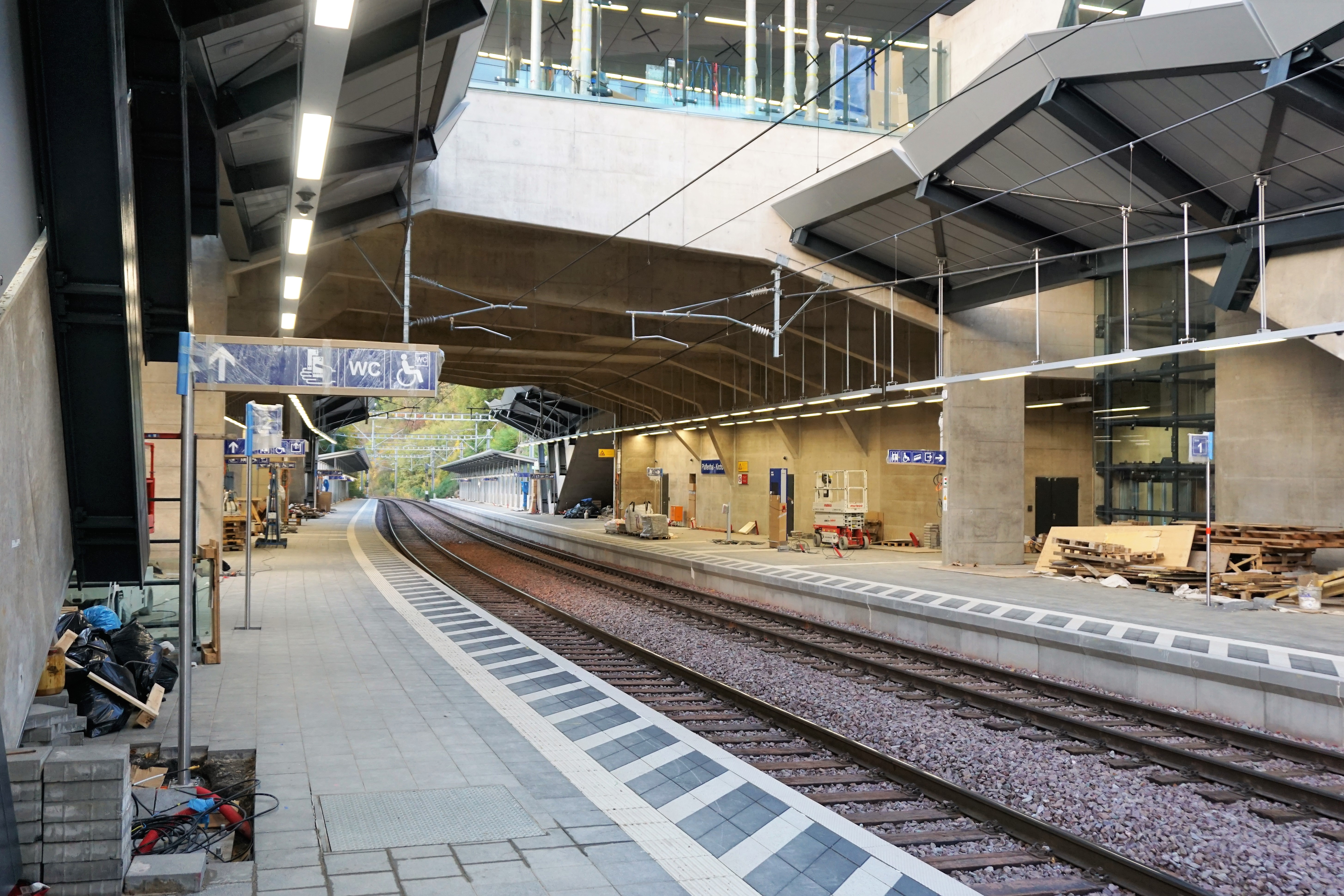
The platforms are connected via an enclosed elevated footbridge.

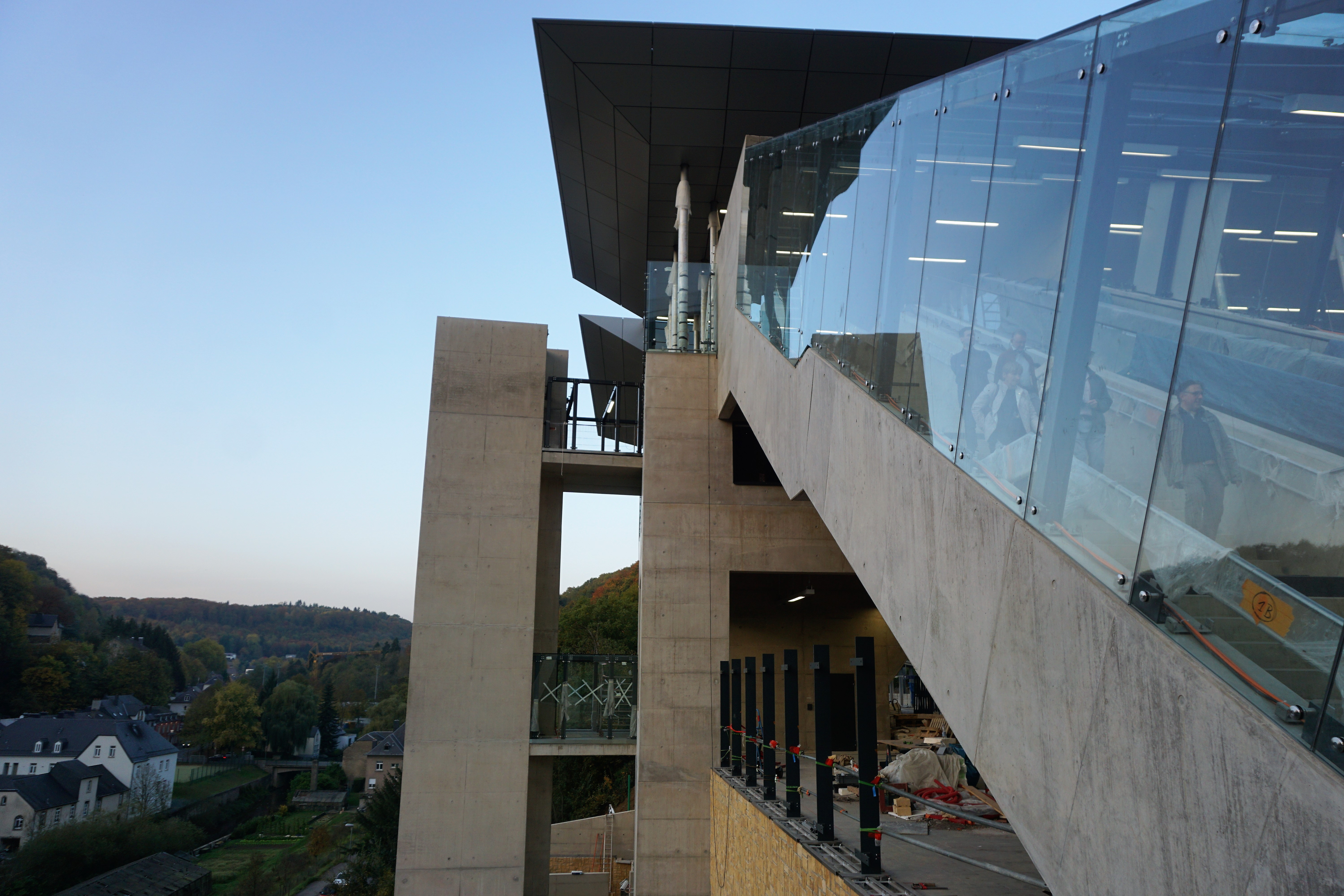
Step-free access is available throughout the platform.

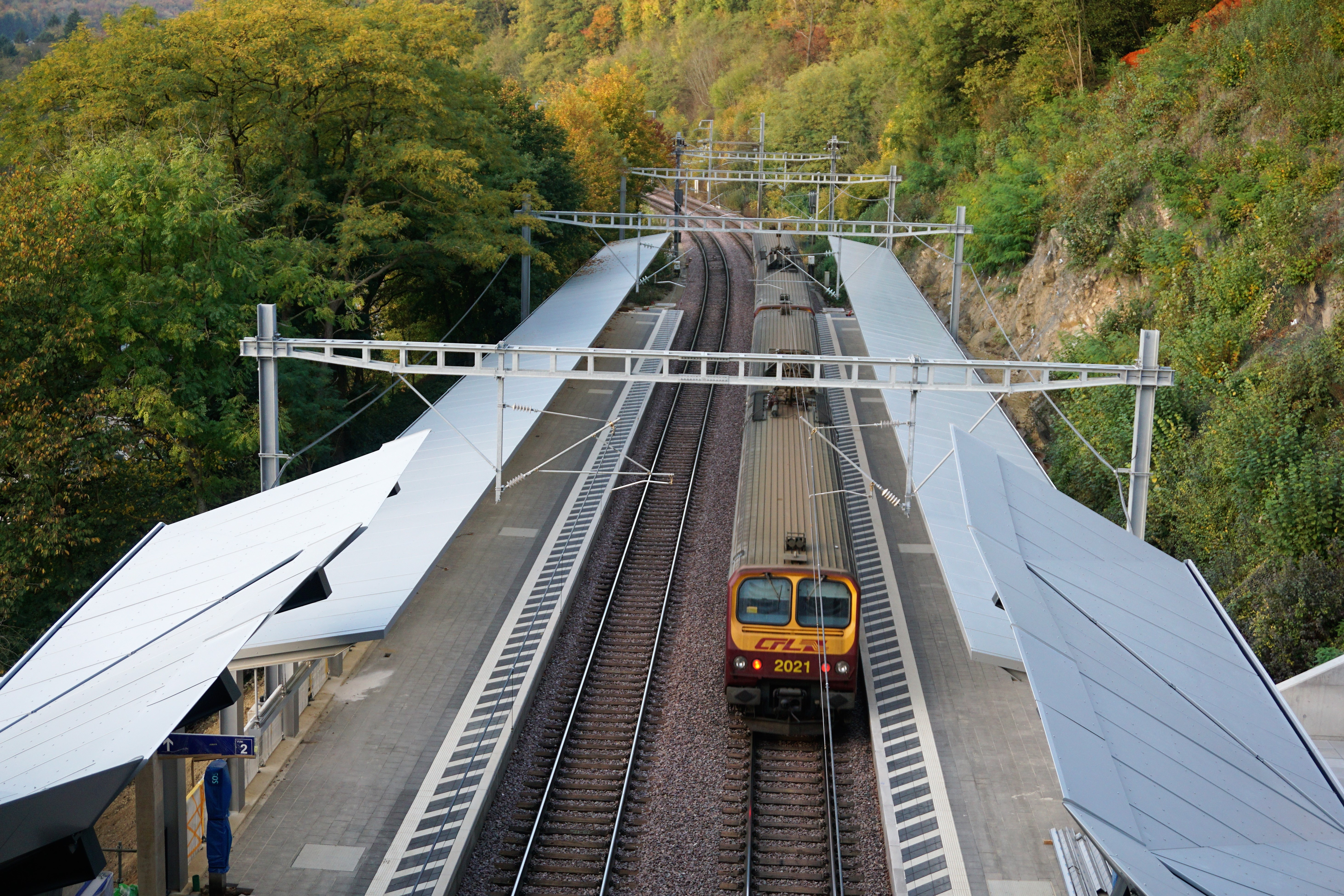
A view from above looking northward over the platforms.

=== Services ===
Pfaffenthal-Kirchberg station is currently served by five trains per hour and per direction from the InterCity (IC), Regional-Express (RE) and Regionalbahn (RB) services.

- Line 10: Luxembourg - Troisvierges - Gouvy (- Liège-Guillemins for IC services), 1 train per hour;
- Line 10: Luxembourg - Ettelbruck - Diekirch (RB), 2 trains per hour;
- Line 10-60: Troisvierges - Luxembourg - Rodange (RE), 1 train per hour;
- Line 10-60: Mersch - Luxembourg - Pétange (RE), 1 train per hour.

According to Luxembourg's national mobility plan for 2035, Pfaffenthal-Kirchberg station will be served by six trains per hour, each with a direct connection to the south of the country through Luxembourg railway station.

== Other transport services and connections ==
The station is served by the Pfaffenthal-Kirchberg funicular which makes the steep ascent to the main thoroughfare on the Kirchberg plateau, Avenue John F. Kennedy, allowing for use of the connecting tram stop Rout Bréck - Pafendall. In addition, a range of bus services are available from the Kirchberg side of the funicular station, including the municipal AVL lines 6, 12, 16, 18, 21 and 32 and regional RGTR lines 111, 112, 201, 211, 221, 811 and 812. On the opposite side, in the Pfaffenthal valley, the Rue St Mathieu entrance to the station is served by the AVL 23 and 26 bus lines.

Located a short walk from the station's Rue St Mathieu entrance, across the Alzette river, on the opposite side of the valley is the Pfaffenthal Panoramic Elevator, a public elevator providing a connection to the Pescatore Foundation Park in Ville Haute.

The Pfaffenthal entrance to the station includes 44 cycle parking spaces and 56 secure paid cycle parking spaces, whilst the Kirchberg entrance has capacity for 53 cycle parking spaces, and 56 secure paid cycle parking spaces.

== See also ==
- History of rail transport in Luxembourg
- Luxembourg railway network
- Trams in Luxembourg
- Pfaffenthal-Kirchberg funicular
- Pfaffenthal Panoramic Elevator
