= Mersch railway station =

Railway station in Luxembourg

Mersch Miersch
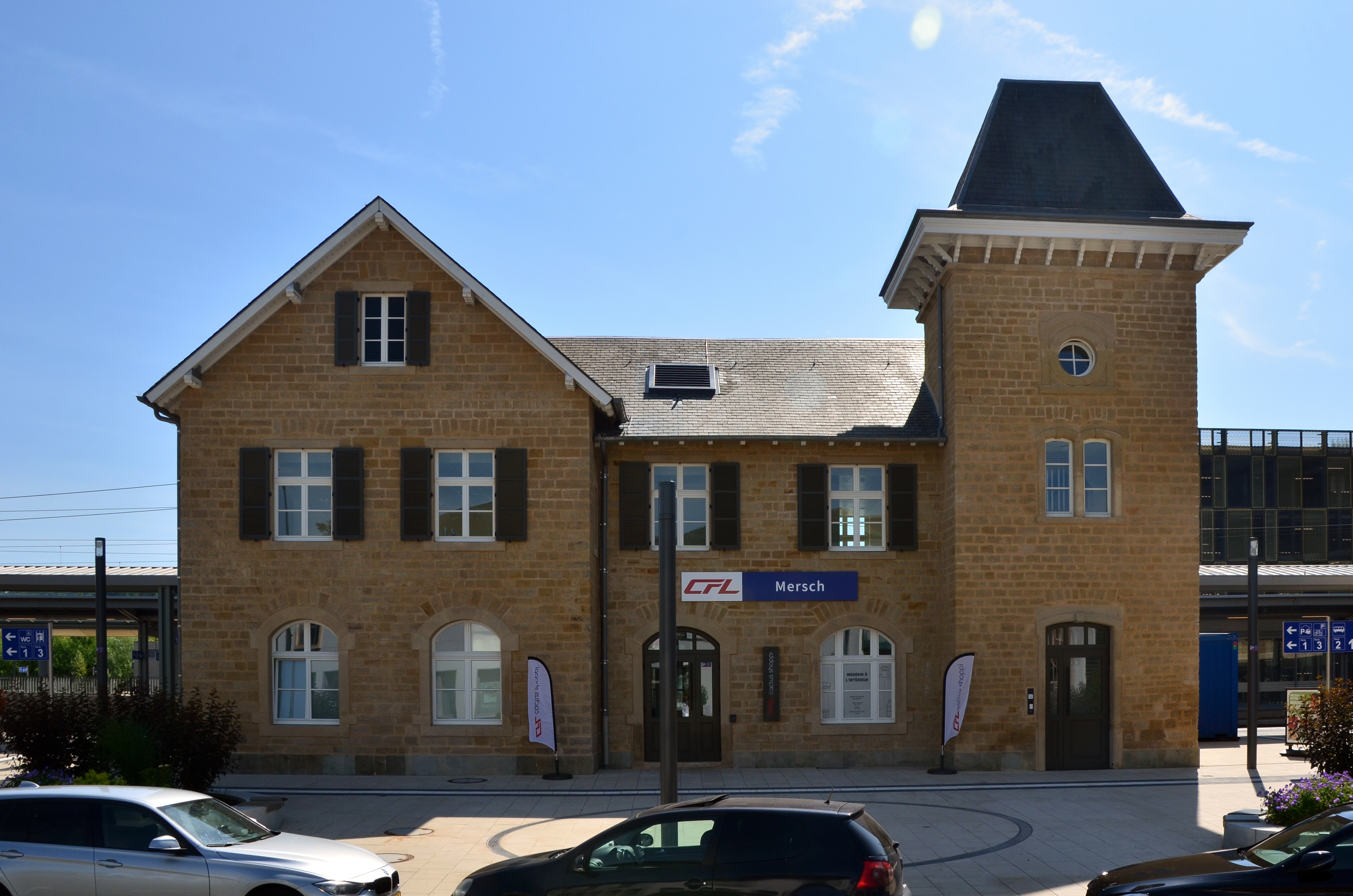

General information
- Location: Rue de la Gare; L-7535 Mersch
- Coordinates: 49°45′07″N 06°06′38″E
- Operator: CFL
- Line: CFL Line 10
- Platforms: 2
- Tracks: 3
- Train operators: CFL, SNCB
- Connections: RGTR bus lines 110, 111, 112, 119, 231, 232, 233, 824, 921, 931, 932, 933, 934, 936 and 937

Construction
- Parking: 272 parking spaces
- Cycle facilities: Parvis; 32 mBox cycle spaces; P+R; 56 mBox cycle spaces

Other information
- Website: CFL

History
- Opened: 21 July 1862

Passengers
- 2022: 1,336,910
- Rank: 7 of 60

Services
Preceding station	CFL	Following station
Walferdange towards Luxembourg	Line 10	Ettelbruck towards Troisvierges
Lintgen towards Luxembourg	Line 10	Cruchten towards Diekirch
Preceding station	NMBS/SNCB	Following station
Pfaffenthal-Kirchberg towards Luxembourg	IC 33	Ettelbruck towards Liers
Location

Mersch railway station (Luxembourgish: Gare Miersch, French: Gare de Mersch, German: Bahnhof Mersch) is a railway station serving Mersch, in central Luxembourg. It is operated by Chemins de Fer Luxembourgeois, the state-owned railway company.

The station is situated on Line 10, which connects Luxembourg City to the centre and north of the country.
