= Pfaffenthal Panoramic Elevator =

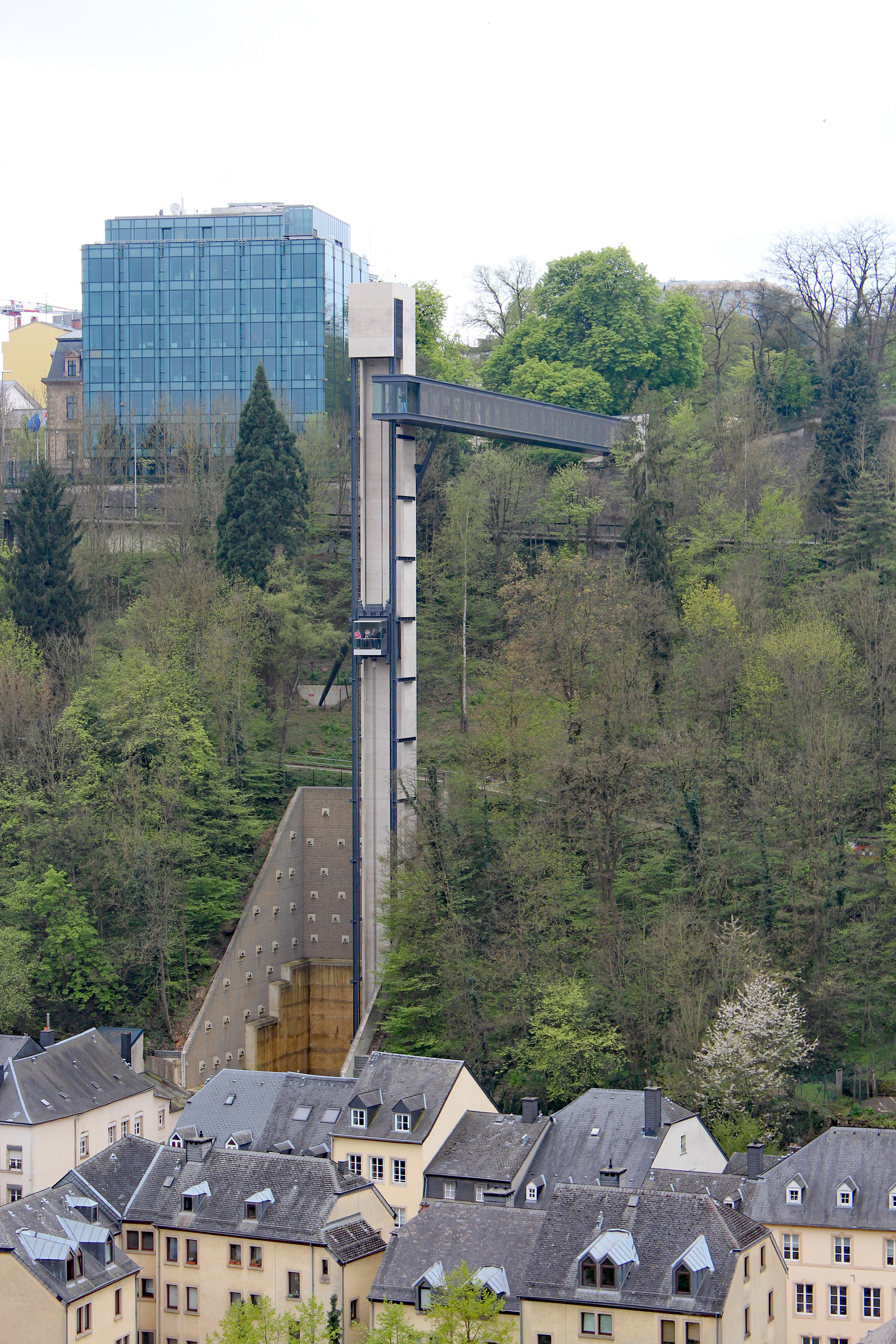

General information
- Type: Public elevator and enclosed footbridge
- Location: 2 Rue du Pont, L-2344, Luxembourg City, Luxembourg
- Coordinates: 49°36′55.87″N 6°7′50.34″E
- Groundbreaking: 10 December 2009
- Opened: 22 July 2016; 10 years ago
- Cost: € 10,533,514

Height
- Roof: 74.77 m (245 ft)
- Top floor: 60 m (197 ft)

Website
- Panoramic Elevator of the Pfaffenthal

The Pfaffenthal Panoramic Elevator (Luxembourgish: Lift Pafendall-Uewerstad; French: Ascenseur panoramique Pfaffenthal - Ville-Haute; German: Aufzug Pfaffenthal-Oberstadt) is a public elevator in Luxembourg City, Luxembourg which connects the city districts of Ville Haute, the historical city center, with Pfaffenthal, in the Alzette valley below. It offers its passengers panoramic views of the Alzette river valley. The Pfaffenthal elevator, together with the Grund public elevator and the Pfaffenthal-Kirchberg funicular, form Luxembourg City's three cable transport modes connecting its elevated city with city quarters located in the Alzette and Pétrusse river valleys.

== History ==
=== Background ===
In 2006, Luxembourg City planners, noting the city's topography of plateaus and deep gorges, began exploring the possibility of a mechanical link to facilitate greater pedestrian and bicycle mobility between the historical city center, Ville Haute, on the Luxembourg plateau and the Luxembourg City quarter of Pfaffenthal in the Alzette valley. Additionally, such a link would increase tourist footfall to Pfaffenthal and complement the existing public elevator connecting Ville Haute to the Luxembourg City quarter of Grund, to the South of Pfaffenthal. This would promote the use of various city walking and bike trails, businesses in the quarter, and improve accessibility to Luxembourg City's UNESCO World Heritage former fortifications, including, amongst others, the Béinchen — a 17th-century, Vauban-designed fortified bridge over the Alzette River. A 2007 study considered various options, including a funicular, escalators and aerial cable cars before settling on an elevator. The primary reasons for this choice included building costs, maintenance costs, spatial constraints imposed by the existing street layout in Pfaffenthal, and the need to not encroach on designated UNESCO World Heritage sites.

=== Construction ===
Funding of €7.5 million was approved for the project by the Luxembourg City Communal Council on 16 February 2009, with the ground-breaking ceremony being held on December 10 of that year. Construction was delayed for four years due to geological issues in securing the hillside cutting. On June 2, 2014, municipal legislators decided to allocate an additional €2.9 million of funding for the elevator's construction. The enclosed footbridge connecting the elevator shaft to Pescatore Foundation Park was constructed between May and September 2015. The elevator cabin arrived for installation on March 3, 2016. Separate to the elevator's construction budget, on January 26, 2015, a tranche of approximately 1 million euros was approved by the Luxembourg City Communal Council for landscaping and renovation of the Pescatore Foundation Park for the elevator's arrival. This included the construction of a 220 m-long (720 ft) bicycle path leading from Boulevard Robert Schuman, immediately prior to the Grand Duchess Charlotte Bridge, to the footbridge of the Pfaffenthal elevator.

=== Inauguration ===
The elevator was opened to the public following an official inauguration ceremony on July 22, 2016. In its first year of operation, the Pfaffenthal Panoramic Elevator is estimated to have carried more than 33,000 persons. In December 2017, Lydie Polfer, Mayor of Luxembourg City, announced a desire for the construction of a third public elevator in the city, between the Pétrusse Valley and Place de la Constitution in the Ville Haute, modelled on the success of the Grund and Pfaffenthal elevators. As of 2024, this project was still in the stage of preliminary analysis. Meanwhile, a panoramic elevator linking the valley neighbourhood of Neudorf to a new pedestrian and cycle bridge connecting Weimershof to Cents began construction in April 2025 and is due to be completed by 2028.

== Design ==
=== Main structure ===
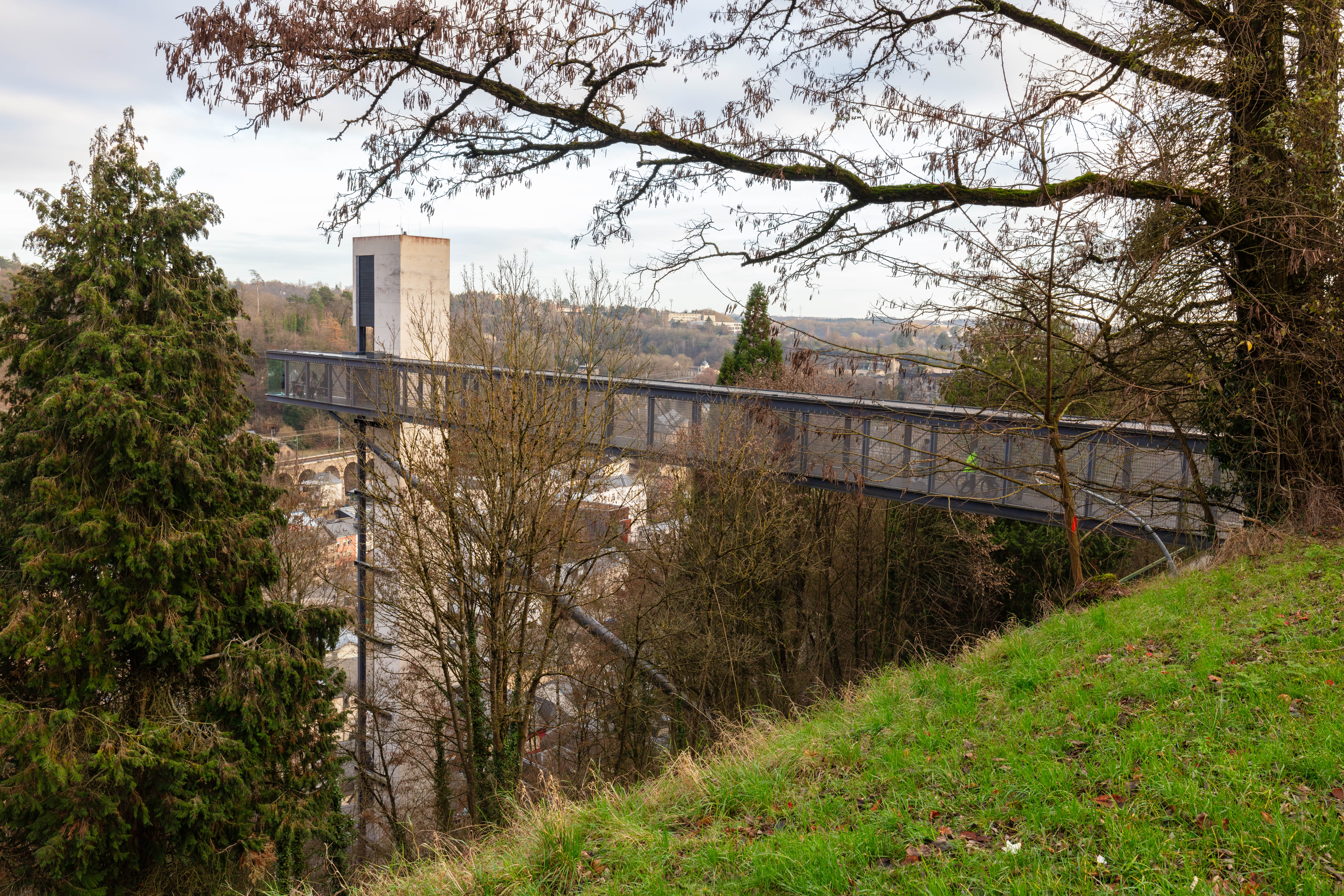
View from the top

The main vertical structure consists of a 74.77 m-tall (245.3 ft), 2.6 m-wide (8.5 ft), 2.6 m-deep (8.5 ft) hollow tower constructed out of reinforced concrete, which contains the elevator counterweight. The valley facing side of the tower acts as the backing for the 60 m-tall (200 ft) elevator shaft, open on its face and nearly completely open on its sides, topped by a protrusion encasing the elevator machine room. Vertical steel guide rails for the elevator are attached to the main tower via horizontal steel braces at 5 m (16 ft) intervals along the height of the elevator shaft. The tower is set into a 20 m-deep (66 ft), 28 m-high (92 ft) and 13 m-wide (43 ft) cutting in the Cote d'Eich hillside. To stabilize the terrain, the excavated cutting is lined with sprayed concrete, secured by 72 anchor bolts driven as far as 30 m (98 ft) deep into the hillside, with a 16 m-high (52 ft) reinforced concrete retaining wall at its base. The top of the elevator shaft is connected to a small reinforced concrete enclosed entrance located in Pescatore Park in Ville Haute via a 72.27 m-long (237.1 ft), 3 m-wide (9.8 ft) and 3 m-tall (9.8 ft) enclosed steel through-truss footbridge. The bridge passes over the Cote d'Eich road, carved into the hillside. The sides of the enclosed footbridge are lined with a thin wire mesh. The footbridge, being placed laterally to the elevator shaft, protrudes 9 m (30 ft) beyond it over the Alzette valley. At the end of the bridge, large glass floor-to-ceiling panels on its sides and face and a small sheet of glass flooring enable its use as a panoramic observation platform. Finally, the whole combined structure is reinforced via a 618 mm diameter diagonal steel cylindrical strut embedded in the hillside which intersects the tower and footbridge.

=== Cabin and technical details ===
The elevator cabin is 2.3 m (7 ft 7 in) wide and 3.7 m (12 ft) deep. The front of the cabin consists of a 1.65 m-deep (5.4 ft) panoramic section, with glass face, sides, floor and ceiling, offering passengers panoramic views during their journey. To the rear of the cabin, on both sides is a set of 1.6 m-wide (5.2 ft), 2.1 m-tall (6.9 ft) automatic sliding doors, with the North facing door providing access to the footbridge, and the South facing door used for accessing Pfaffenthal. The stainless steel floor at the rear of the cabin prevents erosion during winter from salt grit brought in on the feet of passengers, and excess liquid exits the cabin through drains hidden in the door mechanism.

Technicians designed the cabin to be able to load and unload pedestrians and dismounted cyclists at rate of 1.5 and 4 seconds respectively. The cabin travels the 60 m (200 ft) height at a maximum speed of 2.5 m/s with each journey lasting 30 seconds. The maximum time for passengers awaiting an elevator is 153 seconds.

The cabin weighs 8.5 metric tons (9.4 short tons) and is designed to carry a maximum payload of 5 metric tons (5.5 short tons). This equates to a maximum theoretical capacity of 66 pedestrians. However, the cabin was designed to comfortably accommodate a much more modest mixed load of 5 cyclists and 10 pedestrians per journey, with the total time needed to load, descend/ascend and unload such a payload only taking 94 seconds.

Traction power for the elevator is provided by a 75 kW gearless motor, itself weighing 7.6 metric tons (10 short tons), housed in protruding motor room at the top of the tower. The motor operates at over 75% efficiency and can act as a generator able to inject approximately 50 kW back into the energy grid during light ascents or heavy descents. The traction cables are made out of steel which has been galvanized for outdoor use. Due to the elevator's open exposure to the elements, technicians decided to supply power to the cabin via the steel rail elevator guides, rather than using a wired connection. This powers, amongst other services, the cabin lighting, the onboard information screen, and anti-condensation heating for the glass panels.

Meteorological sensors continuously monitor wind strength and guide the elevator to a particular level and immobilize it if conditions are unfavourable. In the case of serious mechanical issues, resulting in the elevator becoming stranded, a rescue platform, with its own independent power supply and motor is stored at the top of the elevator shaft, hidden by the main motor housing.

=== Approaches ===
The Pfaffenthal level entrance to the elevator is located at the end of Rue du Pont. Here, two public toilets, installed in the pavilion at the base of the tower where the elevator docks, a Vel'Oh! bicycle rental station with five bicycles, and a single disabled parking space can be found. Located a short walk from the elevator's lower entrance across the Alzette River on the opposite side of the valley are the Pfaffenthal-Kirchberg railway station and funicular, opened jointly on 10 December 2017.

At the top of the elevator, the enclosed footbridge leads out into Pescatore Foundation Park, located at the intersection of the Boulevard Robert Schuman and Avenue de la Porte Neuve, and is connected to the rest of Ville Haute via the various bicycle paths and footpaths within.

National Cycle Path 1, which encircles Luxembourg City, runs at the elevator's base, whilst the Grand Duchess Charlotte Bridge, accessible via the bicycle path leading from the top of the tower, marks the start of national Cycle Path 2, heading towards Echternach.

== Maintenance ==
The elevator undergoes frequent maintenance, closing at least every first Monday of the month after 9 am.

== See also ==
- Pfaffenthal
- Pfaffenthal-Kirchberg railway station
- Pfaffenthal-Kirchberg funicular
