= Kinepolis Kirchberg =

Cinema in Luxembourg, Luxembourg

Coordinates: 49°38′03″N 06°10′23″E

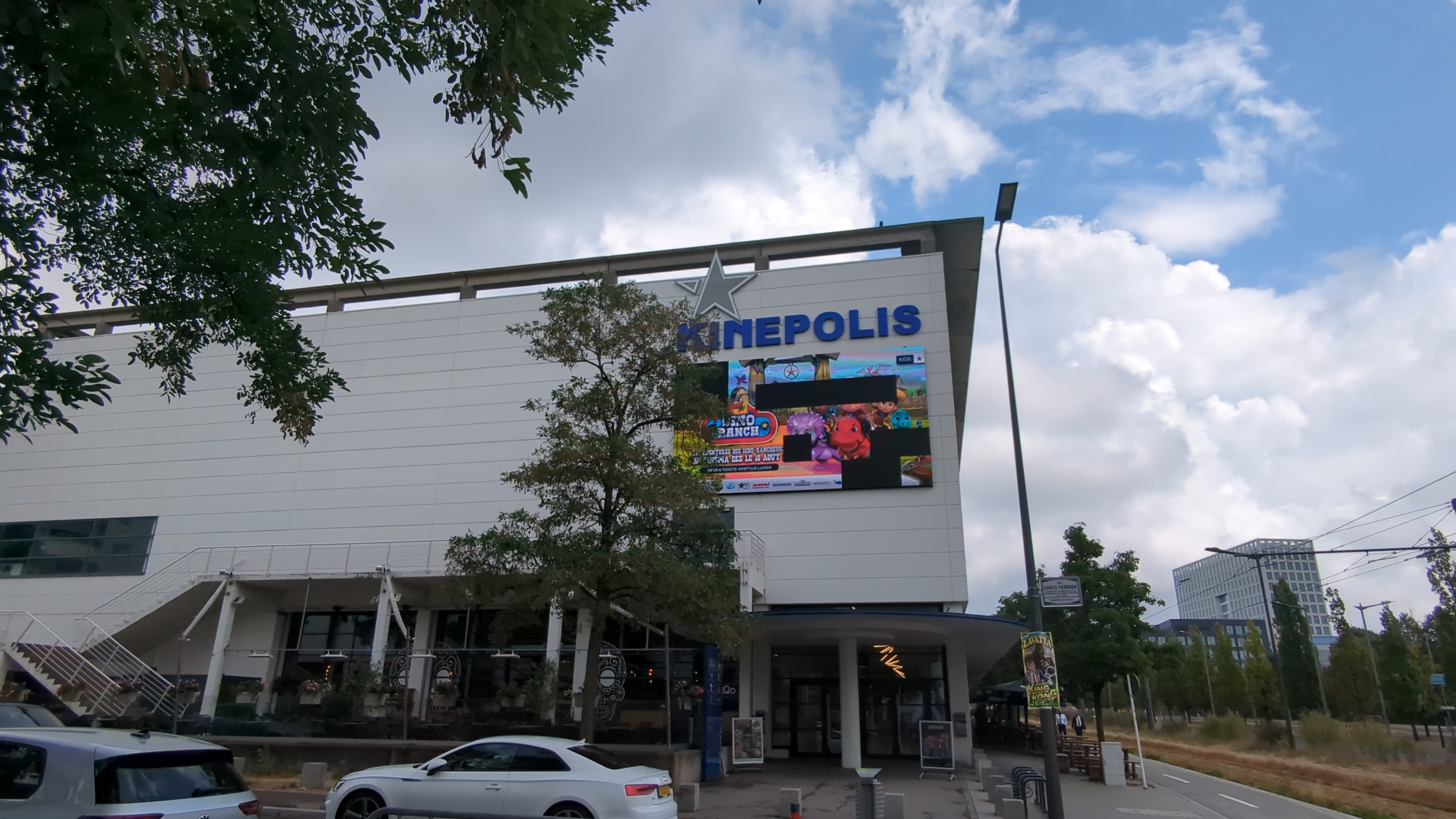
Kinepolis Kirchberg

Kinepolis Kirchberg is a multiplex cinema in Luxembourg City, in southern Luxembourg, owned and operated by the Kinepolis Group, following their acquisition of the Utopia Group SA in late 2015. Prior to this, the multiplex was known as Utopolis Kirchberg. It is located on Avenue John F. Kennedy east of the Kirchberg District Centre in the Kirchberg district, in the north-east of the city. Originally opened in 1996, it has a total seating capacity of 2505, spread across ten screens, making it the largest cinema in the country.
