= Alcide De Gasperi building =

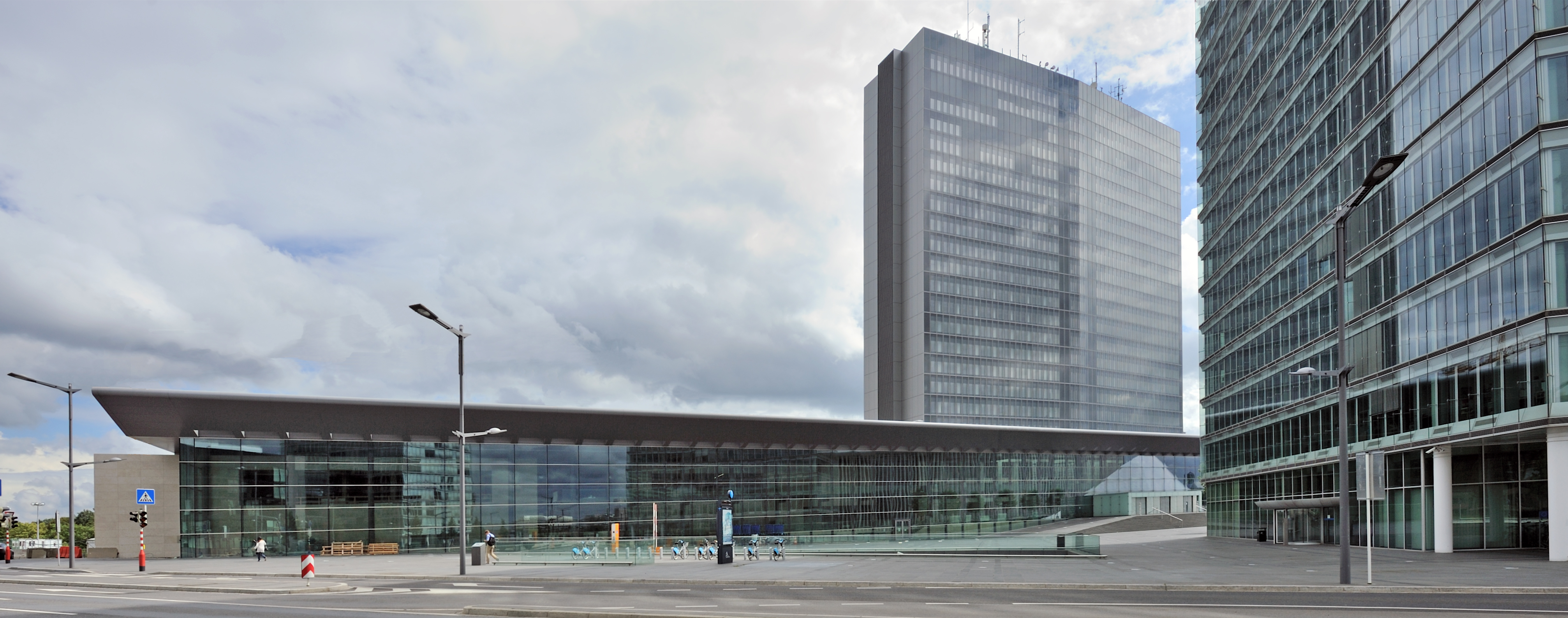

General information
- Status: Completed
- Type: Office
- Location: Luxembourg City, Luxembourg
- Coordinates: 49°37′06″N 06°08′37″E
- Construction started: 1960
- Completed: 1966
- Owner: European Union

Height
- Height: 77 m

Technical details
- Floor count: 23

Design and construction
- Architects: Michel Mousel; Gaston Witry

The Alcide De Gasperi building (named after Italian statesman Alcide De Gasperi) is a skyscraper in Kirchberg, north-eastern Luxembourg City, in southern Luxembourg. At 77 m (253 ft) tall and with 23 floors, it was the first skyscraper and the tallest building in Luxembourg, and was thus dubbed Héichhaus ('High House') in Luxembourgish. It was built in 1966 to house the Secretariat of the European Parliament.
