= Weimerskirch =

District of Luxembourg City, Luxembourg

Weimerskirch Weimeschkierch (Luxembourgish)
- District
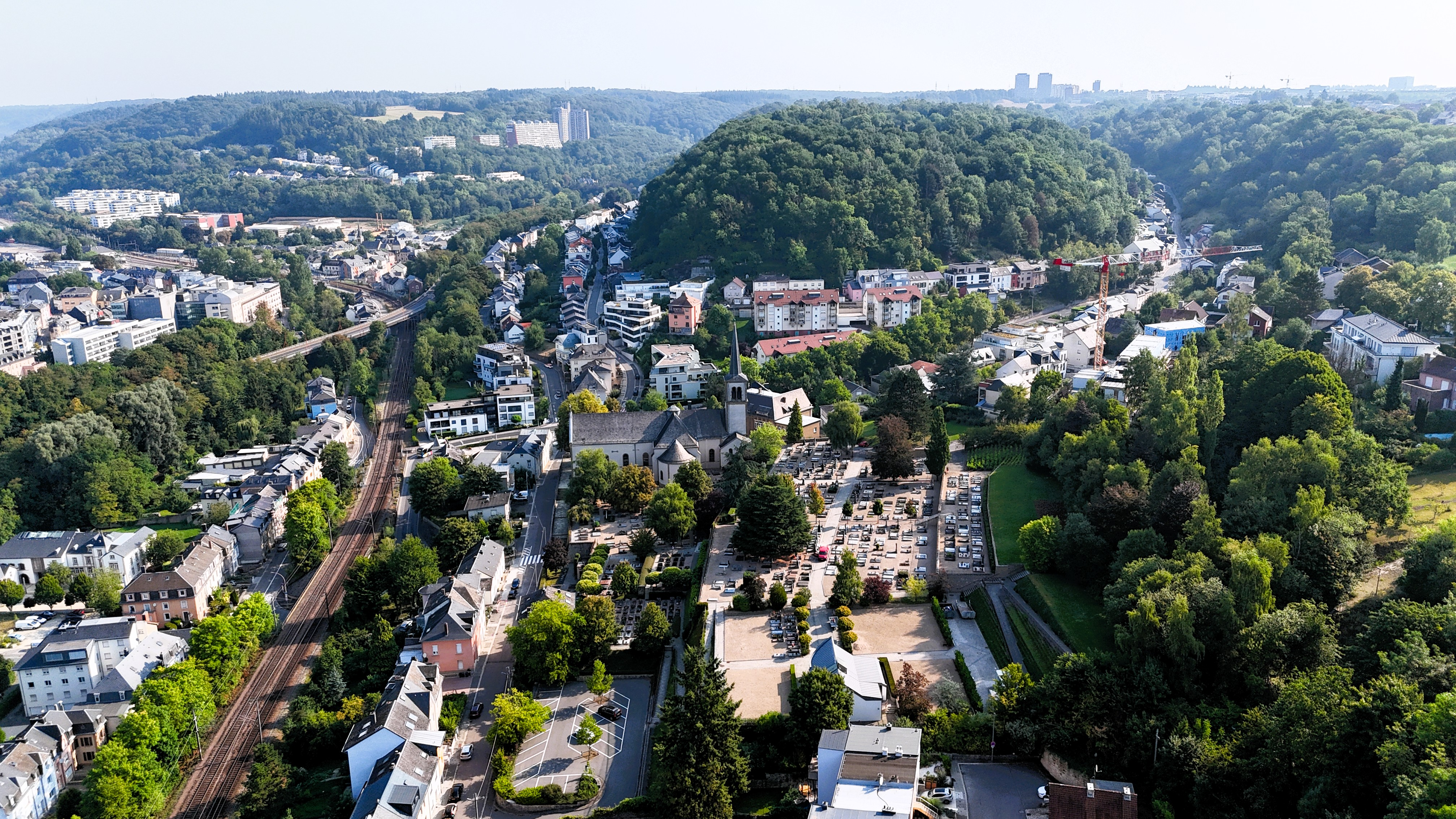

- Weimerskirch is one of 24 districts in Luxembourg City
- Coordinates: 49.628°N 6.135°E
- Country: Luxembourg
- Commune: Luxembourg City

Area
  - Total: 1.1051 km^{2} (0.4267 sq mi)

Population (31 December 2025)
  - Total: 2,471
  - Density: 2,236/km^{2} (5,791/sq mi)

Nationality
  - Luxembourgish: 31.81%
  - Other: 68.19%
- Website: Weimerskirch

Weimerskirch (German pronunciation: [ˈvaɪmɐskɪʁç]; Luxembourgish: Weimeschkierch, pronounced [ˈvɑɪ̯məʃki̯əɕ]) is a district in north-eastern Luxembourg City, in southern Luxembourg. As of 31 December 2025, the district has a population of 2,471 inhabitants.

The current district Weimerskirch is called the "little parish" of the city of Luxembourg. In 723 the Franconian Meier gave Charles Martel the Abbey of St. Maximin, Trier, three estates (fiefs), one's own church, Ecclesia Vidmar, later called Wimariecclesia. The territory declared by the gift of real estate in question, why throughout the centuries Weimerskirch the mother parish for a large part of present-day territory of the city of Luxembourg was, and many later emerged from the parish church area.

Weimerskirch was, until the 1950s, known as the residence of the Yenish that has been called Lakerten Dëppegéisser. By 1900 the number of Yenish families living there was estimated to be forty. Yenish is the Weimerskirch still not received written and oral tradition. Thus there are still a number to popular expressions, which are known mainly the native Weimerskirch and it engages occasionally in their expression.
