= Pfaffenthal-Kirchberg funicular =

Funicular in Luxembourg City

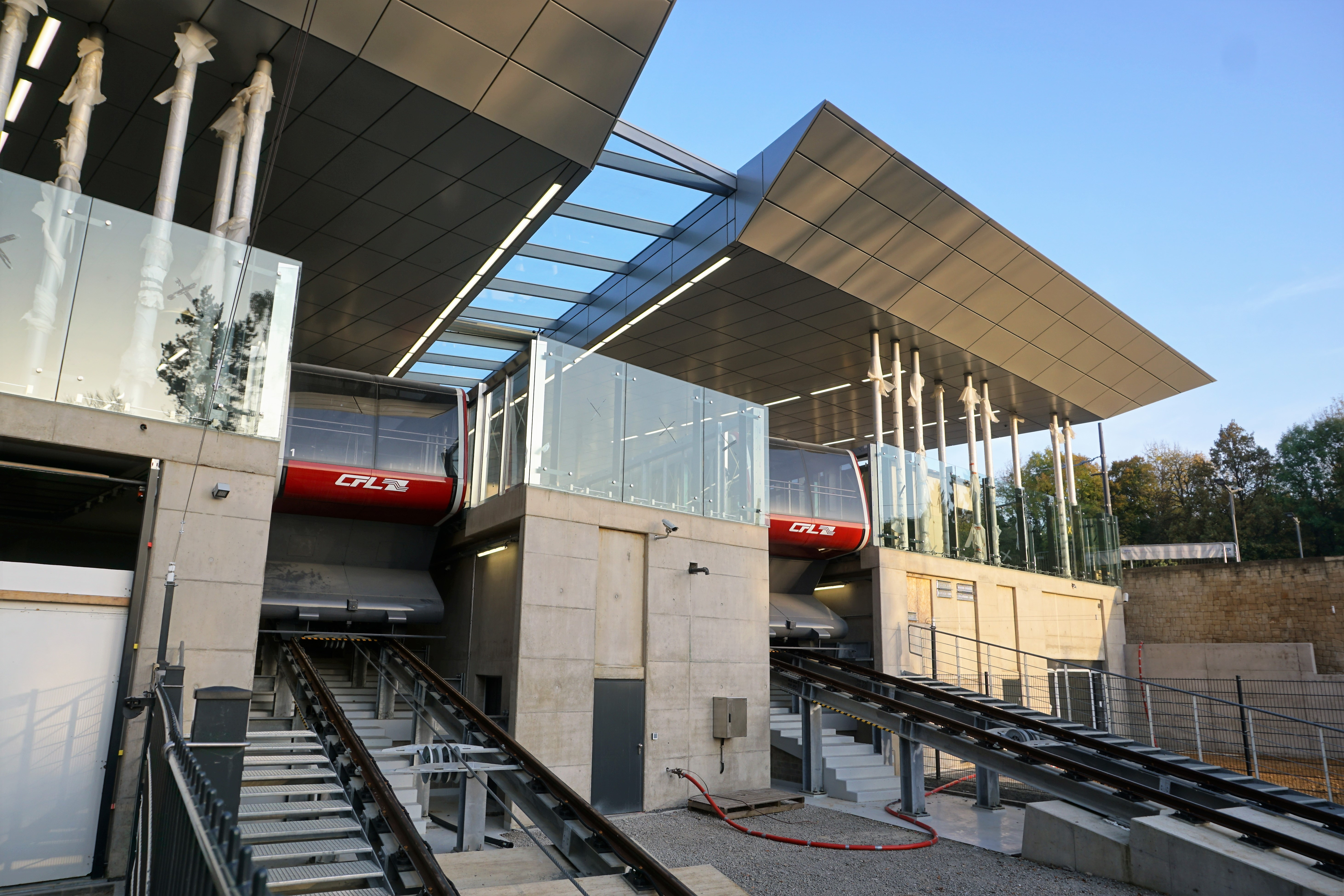
- The Pfaffenthal-Kirchberg funicular in 2017

Overview
- Coordinates: 49°37′8.27″N 6°8′0.58″E
- Stations: 2

Service
- Type: Funicular

History
- Opened: 10 December 2017

Technical
- Track length: 200 metres (660 ft)
- Maximum incline: 19.7%

The Pfaffenthal-Kirchberg funicular is an automated funicular in Luxembourg City. The line links Pfaffenthal-Kirchberg railway station, on Société Nationale des Chemins de Fer Luxembourgeois (CFL) Line 10, to Rout Bréck – Pafendall tram stop, on Luxtram, near the European Investment Bank headquarters. The line is adjacent to the landmark Grand Duchess Charlotte Bridge, which is crossed by the tram line and which passes over the railway line.

Construction work for the line started in early 2015. It has been in service since 10 December 2017, alongside Pfaffenthal-Kirchberg railway station and Luxtram.

By April 2024, it had been used by 10,000,000 passengers since its opening.

== Overview ==
The funicular actually consists of two parallel lines. Each line has a passing loop and two cars, and operates on the funicular principle by which one car counterbalances the other, but the two lines can operate independently, allowing either two or four cars to be used depending on demand. Each of the cars can carry up to 168 people, a journey takes 63 seconds, and the line has a maximum capacity of 7,200 people per hour. The funicular is approximately 200 metres (660 ft) in length, overcomes a height difference of 38.7 metres (127 ft), and has a constant slope of 19.7%.

== See also ==
- Pfaffenthal-Kirchberg railway station
- Pfaffenthal Panoramic Elevator
