= Ville Haute =

District of Luxembourg City, Luxembourg

Ville-Haute: Ville-Haute (French); Uewerstad (Luxembourgish); Oberstadt (German)
- District
- Country: Luxembourg
- Commune: Luxembourg City

Area
  - Total: 1.0590 km^{2} (0.4089 sq mi)

Population (31 December 2025)
  - Total: 3,513
  - Density: 3,317/km^{2} (8,592/sq mi)

Nationality
  - Luxembourgish: 31.85%
  - Other: 68.15%
- Website: Ville Haute

The Ville-Haute (Note: French pronunciation: [vil ot]; Luxembourgish: Uewerstad, pronounced [ˈu̯əvɐʃtaːt]; German: Oberstadt, pronounced [ˈoːbɐʃtat]; all lit. 'High City' or lit. 'Upper Town') is a district in central Luxembourg City, in southern Luxembourg. It is the historic center of Luxembourg City and is involved in its UNESCO World Heritage Site status. As of 31 December 2025, the Ville-Haute has a population of 3,513 inhabitants.

The Ville-Haute is home to prestigious squares, buildings and monuments such as Place Guillaume II, Place d'Armes, Notre-Dame Cathedral and Grand Ducal Palace, as well as many government institutions. The Gëlle Fra Monument of Remembrance war memorial is situated on Place de la Constitution.

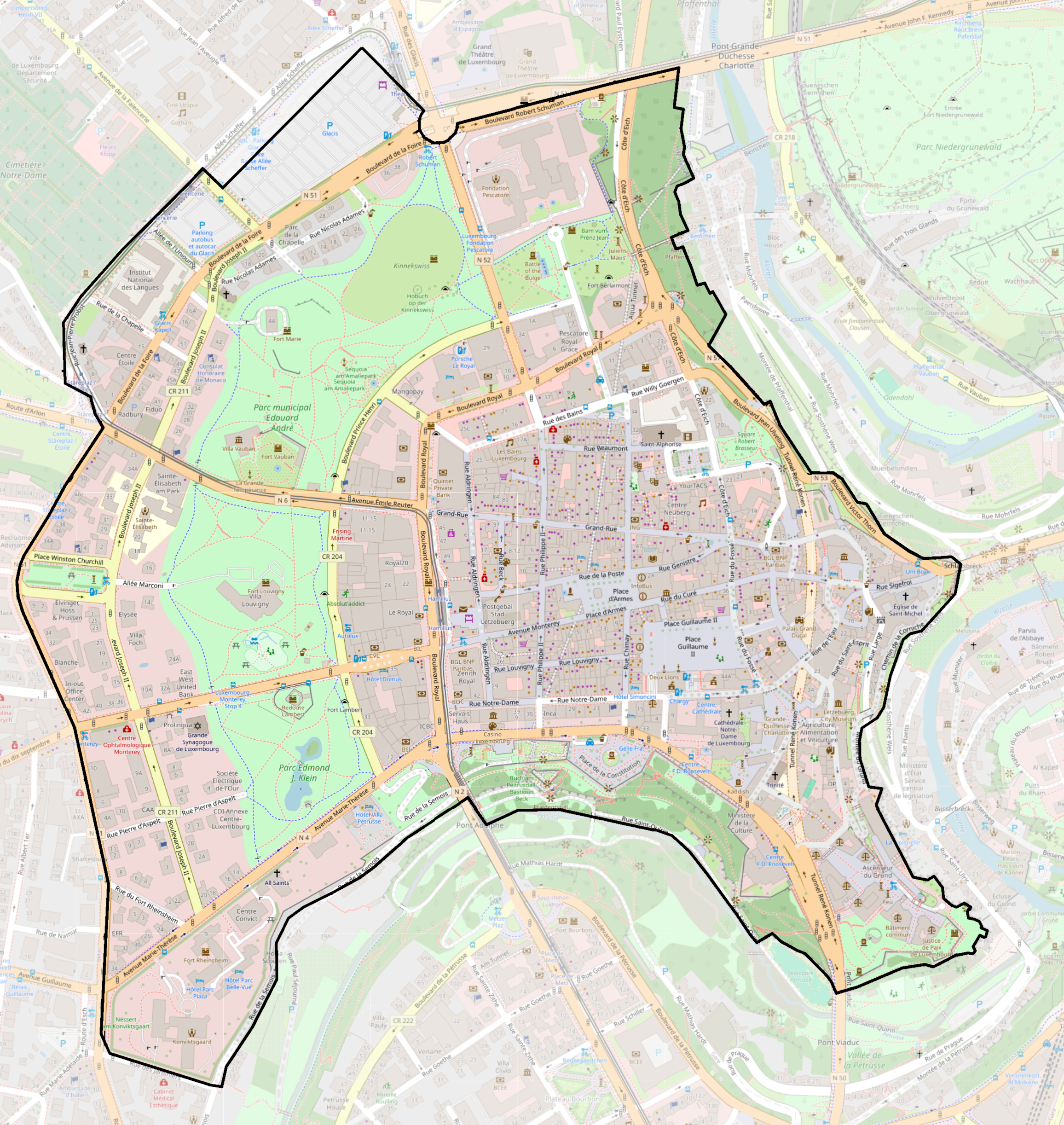
Detailed map of the Ville-Haute
