= Édouard André Municipal Park =

Public park in Luxembourg City, Luxembourg

- Parc municipal Édouard André, Stater Park
- Aerial view of the southern part of the park, including the Villa Louvigny

- Detailed map of the park
- Type: Public urban park
- Location: Ville Haute, Luxembourg City, Luxembourg
- Coordinates: 49°36′49″N 06°07′22″E
- Area: 19 hectares (47 acres)
- Created: 10 July 1878
- Designer: Édouard André
- Operator: City of Luxembourg
- Vegetation: 1,299 trees (2022)

Édouard André Municipal Park (French: Parc municipal Édouard André), also known as the City Park (Luxembourgish: Stater Park, French: Parc de la ville), is a public urban park in Luxembourg City, in southern Luxembourg. Located in the Ville Haute district, it forms a green belt around the west and north of the historic city centre. The park is traversed by Avenue Monterey, Avenue Émile Reuter and Avenue de la Porte Neuve, separating it into four distinct sections, and has a total area of 19 hectares (47 acres), making it the largest of Luxembourg City's 15 parks.

The park's history goes back to the 1867 Treaty of London, which imposed the perpetual neutrality of Luxembourg and the dismantling of the city's vast fortifications. In 1871, French landscape architect Édouard André, known for his work on the Parc des Buttes Chaumont in Paris, was invited to design the new park, which he did in an English landscape garden style, benefitting from the uneven terrain left by the fortifications. The park was completed between 1872 and 1878, and its terrain perpetually ceded to the city of Luxembourg in 1875. Contemporary accounts suggest the park's early years were marked by a certain neglect, but by the turn of the century, it became a popular gathering place, thanks in part to the presence of two restaurants. From 1904 to 1954, the park was directly served by the Luxembourg-Parc station on the Luxembourg-Echternach narrow gauge railway line.

Two of the main points of interest in the park are the Villa Vauban, built in 1873 and expanded in 2010, which serves as the city's art museum, and the Villa Louvigny, which as the home of broadcaster RTL from 1931 to the 1990s, hosted the Eurovision Song Contest in 1962 and 1966. It also features a number of sculptures and memorials, most notably a statue of Princess Amalia of Saxe-Weimar-Eisenach that was inaugurated in 1876, making it the first public monument in Luxembourg, and busts of Victor Hugo and Mahatma Gandhi. As of 2022, the park's flora was made up of 1,299 trees, some of which have been labelled as "remarkable trees", including a 37-metre (121 ft) giant sequoia flanking the Princess Amalia statue, and a horse chestnut planted in 1921 to commemorate the birth of the future Grand Duke Jean.

== Description ==
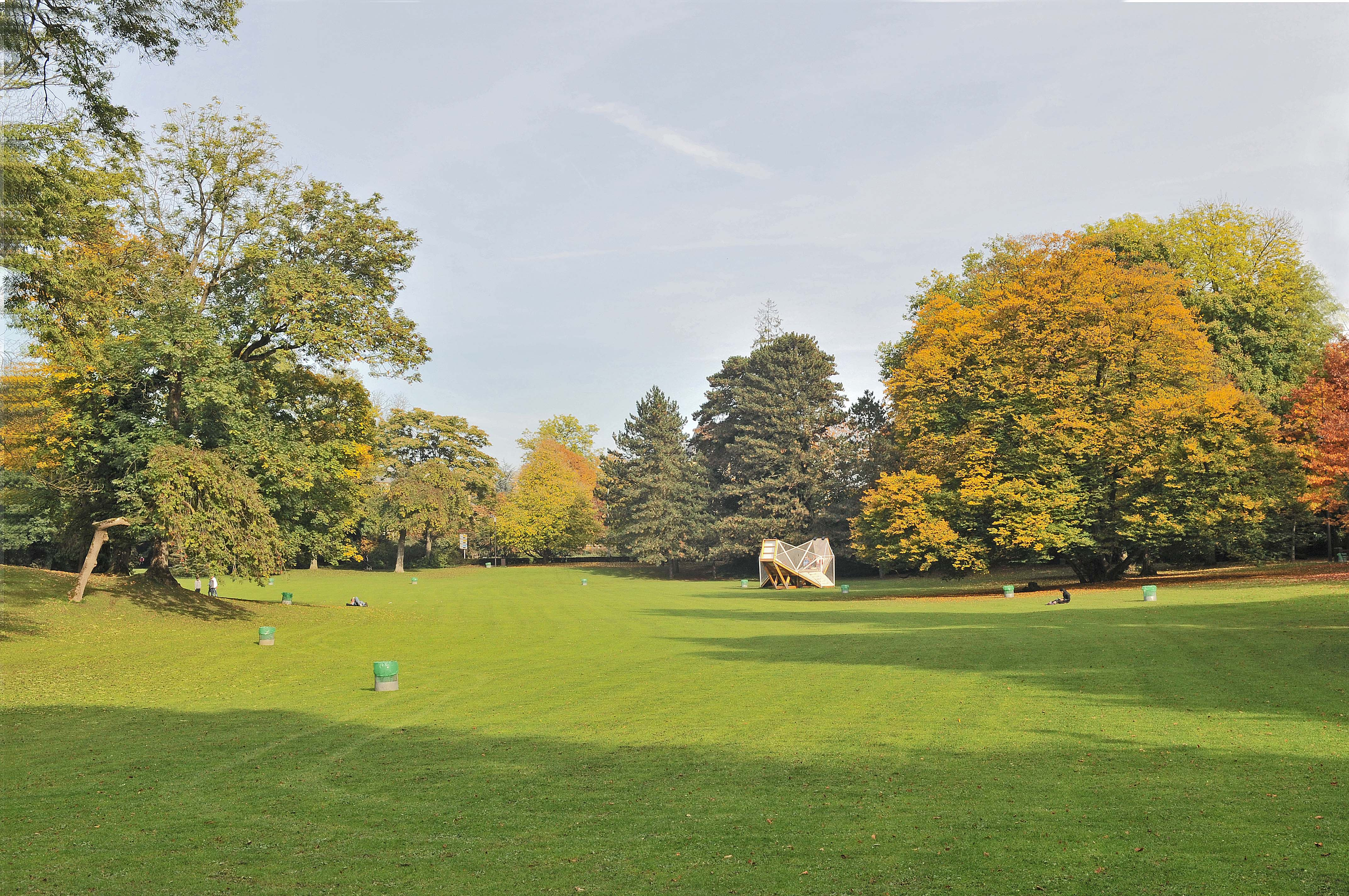
The Kinnekswiss in the Parc Supérieur section

Édouard André Municipal Park is located in the Ville Haute district, in central Luxembourg City. It forms a green belt that bounds the historic city centre to its west and north, and is bordered by Avenue Marie-Thérèse to the south, Boulevard Prince Henri to the east, and the Côte d'Eich to the north-east. The total area of the park is around 19 hectares (47 acres), making it the largest of the city's 15 parks.

The park is sectioned by avenues that radiate out of the city centre, splitting it into four sections; from south to north, these are the 3.3-hectare (8.2-acre) Edmond Klein section, between Avenue Marie-Thérèse and Avenue Monterey, the 5.1-hectare (13-acre) Parc Louvigny section, between Avenue Monterey and Avenue Émile Reuter, the 9-hectare (22-acre) Parc Supérieur section, between Avenue Émile Reuter and Avenue de la Porte Neuve, and the 1.6-hectare (4.0-acre) Pescatore section, between Avenue de la Porte Neuve and the Côte d'Eich.

The largest lawn in the park is the Kinnekswiss ("king's meadow"), in the Parc Supérieur section, which is known as a popular meeting place.

== History ==
=== Treaty of London and Fuchs plan ===
Plan of the fortifications c. 1867

André's 1871 plan for the city park

From the 16th century to 1867, Luxembourg was a fortified city; the Fortress of Luxembourg, known as the "Gibraltar of the North" due to its reputed impregnability, was expanded over the centuries under various occupying forces, most notably by Vauban, Louis XIV's military engineer, from 1684 onwards. By 1867, defence works covered 177 hectares (440 acres), while the city itself occupied an area of just 126 hectares (310 acres); permanent constructions were forbidden in a nearly 1-kilometre (0.62 mi) radius around the fortress. In the times of the fortress, green space in the city was exclusively private and shielded from public view, its enjoyment largely reserved to wealthy citizens or religious communities. Despite the growing interest of the city's bourgeoisie in public space designed for recreation, notably inspired by the vast promenades and parks created in Paris under Baron Haussmann, it would take until 1867 for similar advances to take place in Luxembourg City.

On 11 May of that year, the Treaty of London was signed, ordering the perpetual neutrality of Luxembourg, the dismantling of the fortress and the departure of the Prussian garrison that occupied it. While this would allow Luxembourg to become an "open city", expanding beyond its former walls, it also rid it of its military importance, forcing it to find a new identity and purpose. Ideas of founding a university or developing the city into an industrial town were considered, but were abandoned in favour of establishing the city as a decision-making centre and prominent interconnected marketplace. In July 1867, Belgian landscape architect Louis Fuchs, who had worked on the urbanism of Mons, was tasked by the Luxembourgish government with establishing a plan for the transformation of the fortifications' terrain, which had become state property.

Fuchs's plan, presented in early 1868, foresaw the creation of four percées (lit. 'pierce-throughs'), straight avenues that would radiate out of the city centre to link it to existing roads and strengthen its connection to international markets. Completed by 1870, these would become the Avenue Marie-Thérèse, Avenue Monterey, Avenue de l'Arsenal (renamed Avenue Émile Reuter in 1974) and Avenue de la Porte-Neuve. To facilitate the demolition of as many defence works as possible, the avenues would be linked together by belt-like residential boulevards. Fuchs proposed the creation of a public park in the space between the two former defence lines; in the times of the fortress, this was already the site of a promenade lined with elm trees, known as the Generolsgaart ('general's garden'), which was open to the public at limited hours and for a fee. In 1871, a project to create a railway station within the park's boundaries was briefly considered; for this reason, later versions of the Fuchs plan gave the park only half of its originally planned size.

=== Planning under André ===
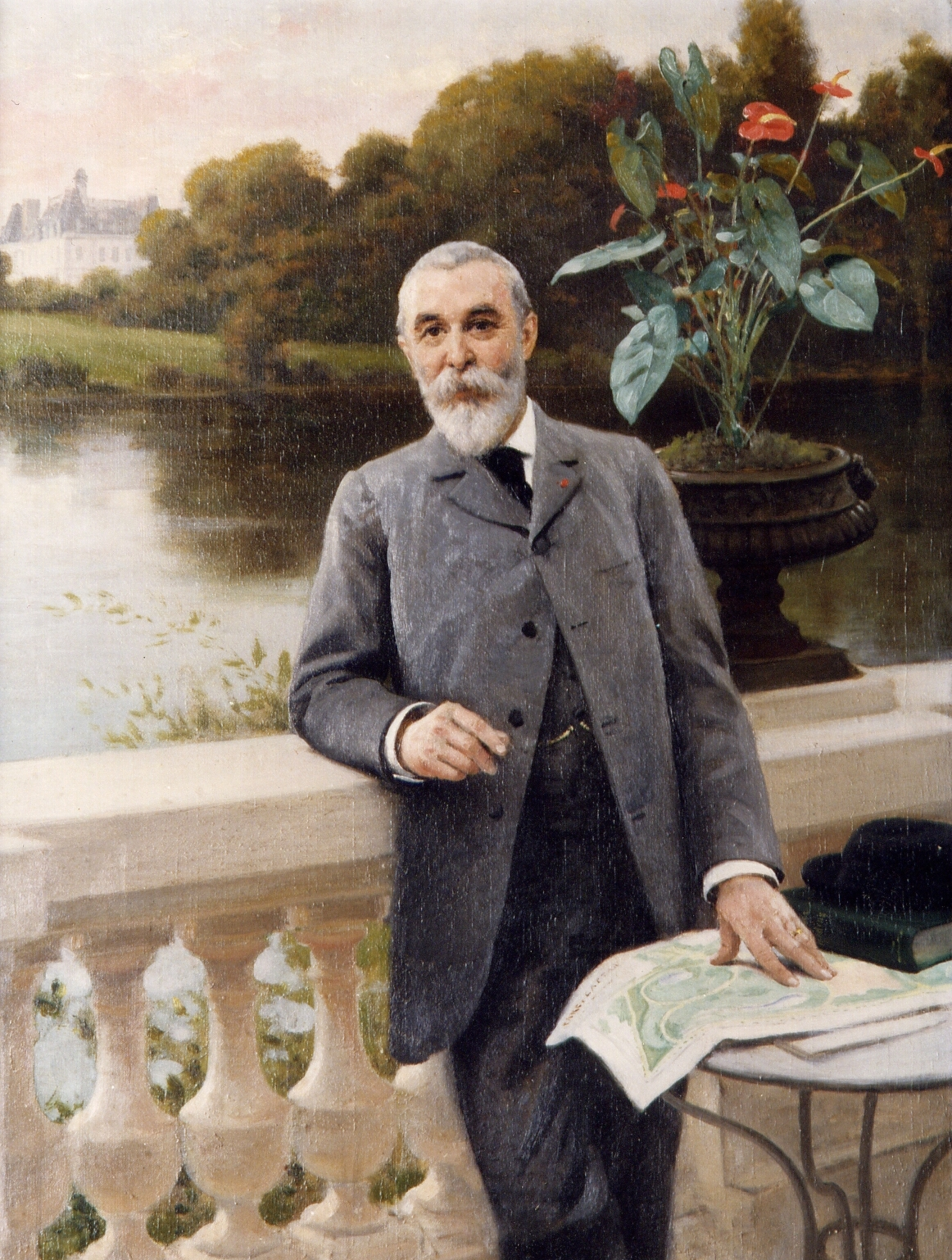
French landscape architect Édouard André worked on the park's design from 1871 onwards.

Paul de Scherff, an advisor to prime minister Emmanuel Servais, successfully pushed for French landscape architect Édouard André to be invited in to design the new park. Aged 31 at the time, André already enjoyed a solid international reputation for his work on parks and gardens, having notably worked on the design of the Parc des Buttes Chaumont in Paris, which, being laid out over a former gypsum quarry, presented similarities to the deep, difficultly constructible ditches left over by the fortifications. The Buttes Chaumont had been inaugurated as part of the 1867 Paris Exposition, where André met Tony Dutreux, the Luxembourgish commissioner at the exposition, who introduced him to De Scherff. André came to Luxembourg City in early 1871 to visit the site of the park; by this time, the dismantling of the fortress was well underway, with most forts demolished. Four enclaves of terrain totalling 2 hectares (4.9 acres) within the future park, three of which corresponded to the ruins of reduits Marie, Vauban and Louvigny, had been auctioned off for the construction of villas. André was simultaneously solicitated by Dutreux and De Scherff for the creation of the 5-hectare (12-acre) gardens of the new Fondation Pescatore care home, of which they were trustees; these gardens would become englobed with the rest of the park.

André's plan for a botanical garden in the southernmost section of the park

André presented his plan for the park, drawn up without any consultation with city authorities, in May 1871; six versions in total were successively made until the approval of a definitive plan in 1873. Described by historian Robert Philippart as having "enormous power" and being "authoritarian in character", he ignored many of Fuchs's considerations, largely disregarding all those that had not yet been implemented. André regretted the sale of terrain within the park, stopping any further sales and placing strict limitations on the construction of villas on terrain already sold; furthermore, he viewed the Boulevard Prince Henri as "sad and boring". Considering the narrowness of the park envisioned in the later versions of the Fuchs plan to be "a serious shortcoming", he eliminated a boulevard planned on its western side, thus doubling the park's size. Beyond its purpose as a 'lung' for the city, the park's creation would serve to limit the quantity of newly available land, and thus hinder the decline in value of real estate in the city; furthermore, the park would serve as a transitional space between the city and countryside, and a boundary between the city's centre and its outer, more working-class neighbourhoods.

André's vision for the park was that of a green belt or "green crown" around the city centre, a concept that was recent at the time, being experimented in the United States and a few European cities. Each section of the park, as delinated by the new avenues, would function as a self-contained, closed-circuit entity, linked to the rest of the park by peripheral alleyways. The existing elm-lined alleyway, referred to by André as "the Luxembourgish people's favourite promenade", would be maintained; some of the elms were said to still be standing as of 1950. The ditches left by the fortifications were only partially filled in, as André, adhering to the model of the English landscape garden and the idea of gardens being "inspired by the compositions of the great landscape painters", designed the park to function as "a long, undulating vista". The roundness of the park's alleyways was softened in later versions of the plan, but they remained curved, espousing the contours of former bastions. Tree groves would be densely planted, forming a green barrier that largely excluded the rest of the city from parkgoers' field of vision. Park entrances were heavily inspired by André's own work at Sefton Park, Liverpool, and that of his friend Frederick Law Olmsted at Central Park. Finally, lawns would provide air and light, with the Kinnekswiss being the only large opening in the park. The city government's proposal to create a large basin and fountain on the Kinnekswiss—a design feature strictly associated with French landscape gardens—was strongly opposed by André, who derided it as "an atrocity utterly unworthy of the enlightened people who lead your Government and your city". (Note: French: une atrocité absolument indigne des gens éclairés qui sont à la tête de votre Gouvernement et de votre ville)

=== Creation and early years ===
Drawing by André of the surroundings of the Princess Amalia Monument, published in 1879

The Luxembourg-Parc narrow-gauge railway station on Avenue de l'Arsenal, pictured in 1904

The first planting in the park took place in the winter of 1872-73; nearly 1,400 trees were planted, mostly maple, chestnut and privet, all sourced from nurseries in Metz. Planting continued until 1878, with the date of the park's completion being considered as 10 July 1878. Through a convention signed on 30 January 1875 and approved by a law of 1 March of that same year, the Luxembourgish state passed ownership of the park onto the City, "to serve as a public promenade", (Note: French: pour servir de promenade publique) on the condition that the City was "never, either temporarily or permanently, to dispose of the park, or parts thereof, or divert it from its intended purpose". (Note: German: niemals, weder vorübergehend noch endgültig, den Park, oder Teile davon, veraußern oder seiner Bestimmung entziehen)

The southernmost section of the park, between Avenue Marie-Thérèse and Avenue Monterey, was designated by the government as a botanical garden, a project initiated in 1868 and spearheaded by André. It aimed to exclusively showcase flora native to Luxembourg, in order to both teach natural sciences to students from city schools and foster a sense of national identity by making Luxembourgers identify more with their land. Popularly known as the Poppekiirfecht ("doll cemetery") due to the appearance of its many tiny, individually labelled patches of soil, it suffered from a lack of maintenance from the city, and the project ended in 1888. A playground was later built there, and in 1948, the section was named in honour of Luxembourgish biologist Edmond J. "Papa" Klein.

Some contemporary accounts portray the park's early years as being marked by a certain neglect. In 1885, voicing his opposition to a suggestion to remove the park's 26 entrances, a public servant from the Public Works department declared: "recently, a foreigner who has travelled greatly told me that our park is very pretty, but that it lacks one thing—people." (Note: French: Dernièrement un étranger, qui a vu beaucoup de pays me dit que notre parc est fort joli, mais qu'il lui manque une chose — du monde.) In an 1886 letter to the Director of Public Works, André praised the execution of the park, but lamented its inadequate maintenance, writing "many from outside Luxembourg City have told me how surprised they are to see your urban green spaces so poorly maintained." (Note: French: De nombreux étrangers de la ville de Luxembourg m'ont manifesté leur étonnement de voir vos plantations urbaines si mal entretenues.) Vandalism was also a concern around this time, leading the city to propose the installation of bilingual warning signs in the park.

Nonetheless, around the turn of the century, the park was a popular gathering place, as the city had authorised the establishment of two restaurants, which also functioned as lemonade parlours, within it. One of these was known as the Villa Amberg; owned by Adolphe Amberg, who had acquired a small piece of land between Fort Vauban and Fort Marie during the 1869 auction, it initially consisted of a garden restaurant with a ballroom. The villa's second iteration was a Swiss-style chalet, built in 1884 or 1885, which comprised a restaurant, a ballroom and latrines, and where concerts were regularly held, making it "one of the city's most popular establishments". It was destroyed by fire in May 1903 and never rebuilt; a playground and pergola were erected in its place.

In 1904, a narrow-gauge railway line linking Luxembourg City to Echternach, in eastern Luxembourg, was inaugurated. As the line, popularly known as the "Charly", passed through Avenue de l'Arsenal before continuing towards Rollingergrund, a stop directly serving the park was created at the behest of Ville Haute business owners, who wanted their district to be better connected. Named Luxembourg-Parc, the stop or station initially consisted of six benches placed in August 1904 for waiting passengers. The next year, a permanent station building was erected; designed by architect Jean Ries, it was built in a Swiss pavilion style using half-timbered techniques, featuring a domed roof and an ornate clock, and comprising a waiting room, luggage room and ticket office.

=== Later years ===
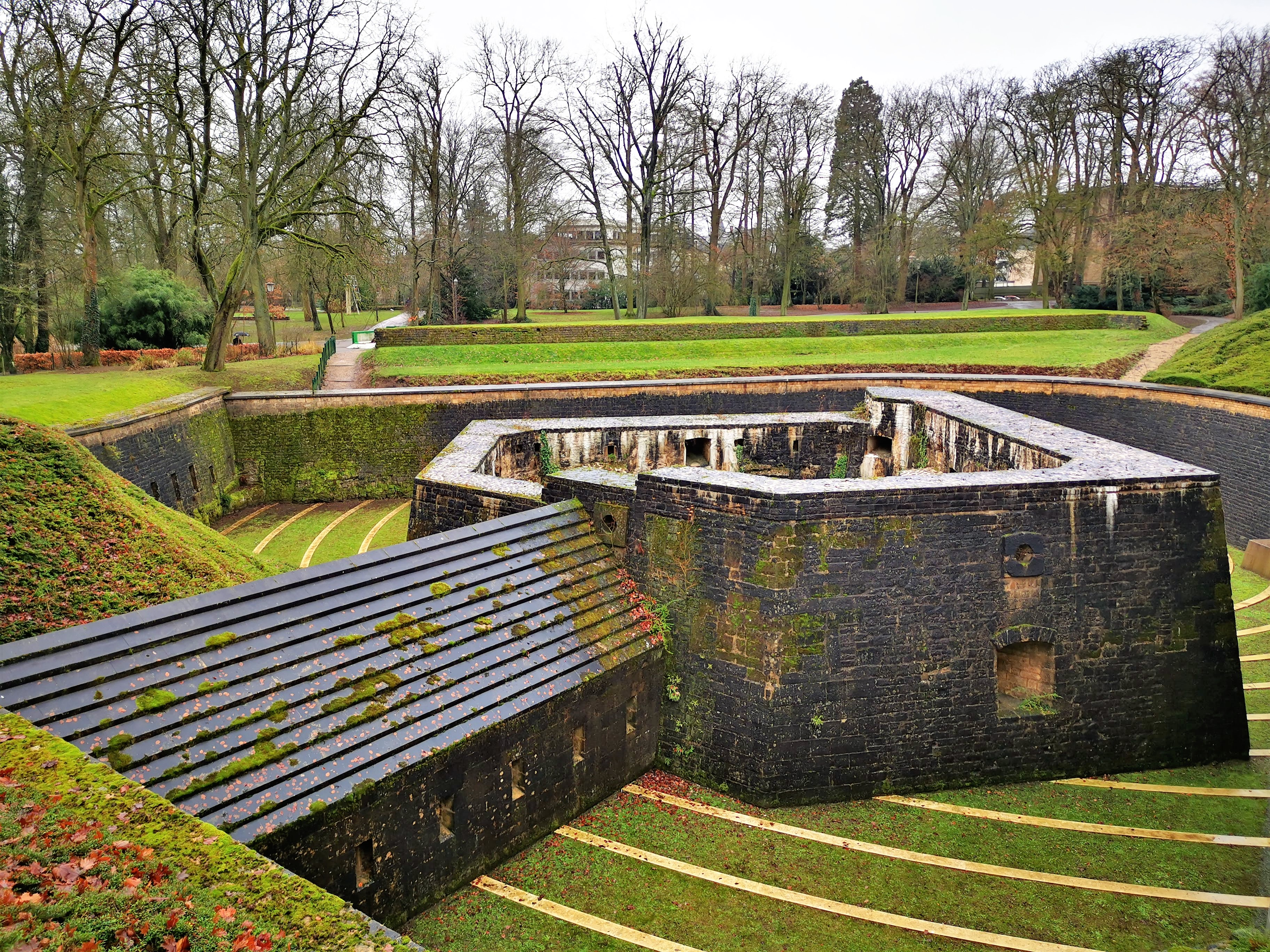
The Lambert Redoubt, uncovered as part of construction work for an underground parking garage

After the closure of the Luxembourg-Echternach railway line in 1954 and its replacement with a bus line, the park station, popularly known as "Charly's Gare", served as a bus stop. Out of "transport-related necessity", the pavilion structure was demolished in November 1964, and replaced with a modern, functionalist design. After it ceased to function as a bus stop with the arrival of the Luxembourg City tramway on the avenue in December 2020, the structure was converted into a bar, which opened in July 2022.

In early 1973, the city of Luxembourg presented plans to create a car park in the Edmond Klein section, after plans to create a car park on Boulevard Royal had been rejected by the government, and despite the City Park's status as non-developable in the existing zoning plan. A vocal critic of the project, which would have created 980 parking spaces, was Luxembourgish architect Léon Krier, later known for his master plan of Poundbury, Dorset, who derided the City for its "runaway planning fantasies" and "ruthless stupidity". The plan ultimately never came to fruition.

In 1994, the city approved a plan to construct an underground parking garage under Avenue Monterey. One condition of the project was the preservation and uncovering of the Lambert Redoubt, a remnant of the former Fort Lambert built under Vauban in 1684 that had been partially demolished and covered with soil after the 1867 Treaty of London, in what became the Edmond Klein section of the park. Following a preliminary survey in 1996 that concluded the redoubt had been exceptionally well preserved, excavating work took place, and it was uncovered in 2001, becoming an integral feature of the park.

== Features ==
=== Buildings ===
==== Villa Vauban ====
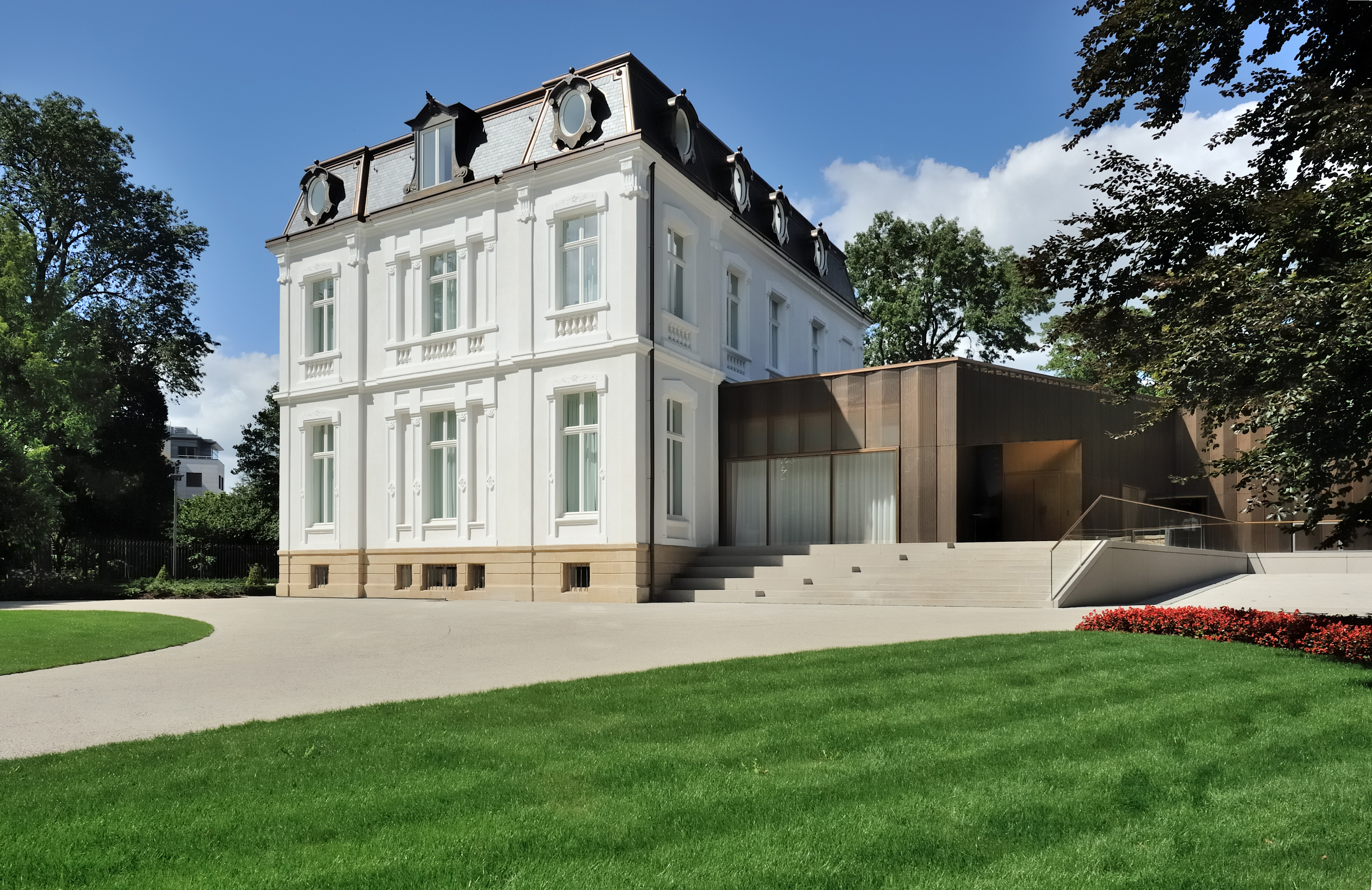
The Villa Vauban, in the Parc Supérieur section, is the city's art museum.

The Villa Vauban, located in the Parc Supérieur section near Avenue Monterey, is Luxembourg City's art museum, mainly housing paintings from the Dutch Golden Age and 19th century French history and landscape painting, bequeathed to the city by three prominent citizens in the 19th century. The museum also holds a significant collection of works from 19th and 20th century Luxembourgish artists.

In November 1868, the 4,215-square-metre (45,370 sq ft) terrain corresponding to Vauban reduit was purchased at an auction by glovemaker Gabriel Mayer, who tasked architect Jean-François Eydt with designing the villa, which was completed in 1873. It was acquired the next year by Charles Joseph de Gargan, a steel industrialist from Lorraine, and his wife Emilie, a member of the prominent Pescatore family; the villa was then passed on to their daughter Anne-Marie de Gargan and her husband, the industrialist and politician Norbert Le Gallais, in 1912. During World War II, it was seized by Nazi occupiers, who used it to house the Ministry of Agriculture and the Price Authority. After the end of the war, it was the residence of Henriette Pescatore and her husband, future prime minister Pierre Werner, for three years, before being put for auction by heirs of the Le Gallais de Gargan family in January 1949.

At the auction, the villa was bought by the city of Luxembourg for 5 million francs, with financial support from the Pescatore family; the city intended to use the villa as the permanent of home of its paintings collection, which had been initiated when philanthropist Jean-Pierre Pescatore willed his personal collection to the city upon his death in 1855. However, following renovation work, the villa initially housed the Court of Justice of the newly created European Coal and Steel Community from 1952 onwards; it was not until the court moved to larger premises in 1959 that the villa was able to serve as a museum. Over the course of five years in the late 2000s, the villa was comprehensively restored and completed by a 1,432-square-metre (15,410 sq ft) extension designed by architect Philippe Schmit, reopening on 1 May 2010.

==== Villa Louvigny ====
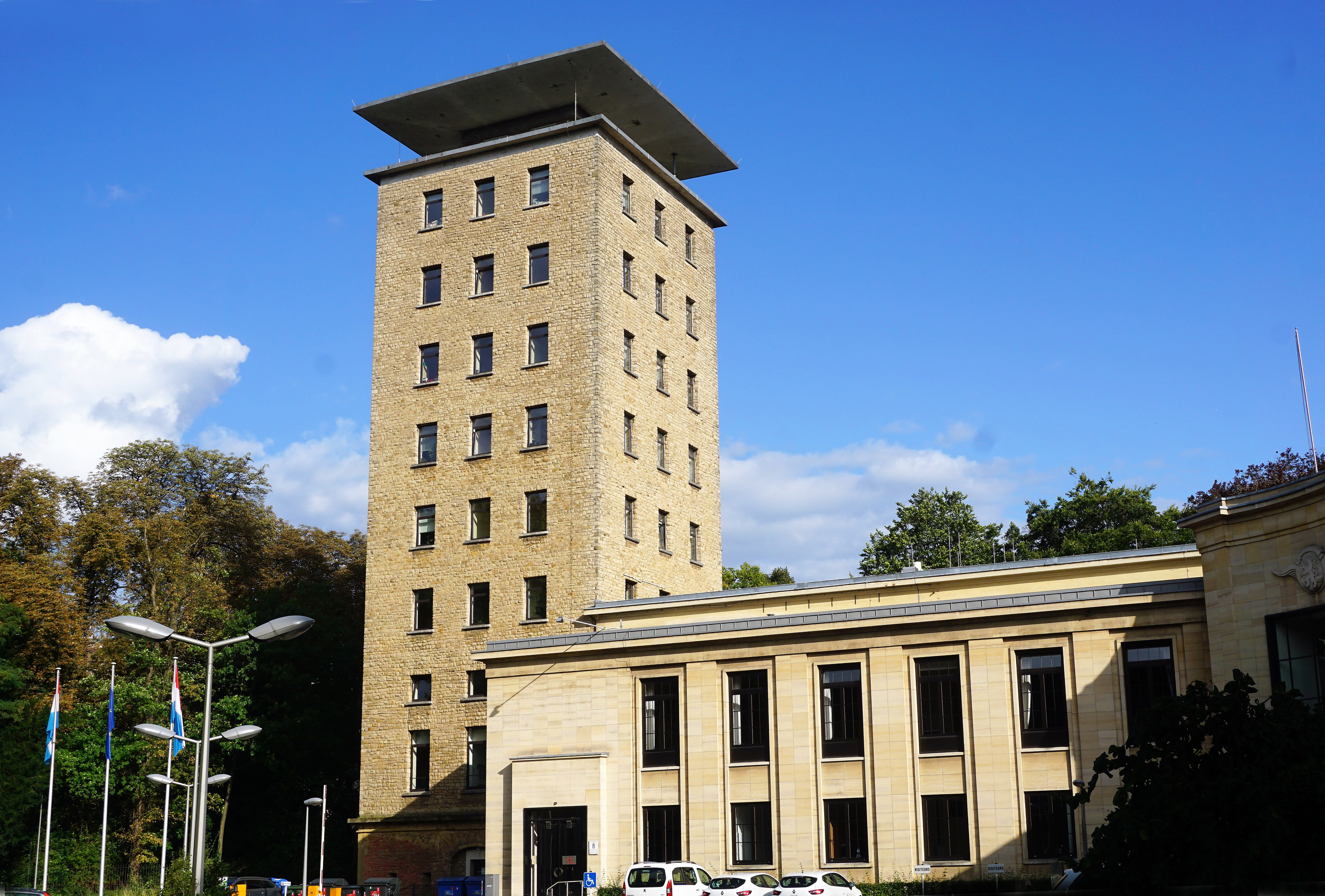
The Villa Louvigny, as the historic home of broadcaster CLT (later RTL), hosted the Eurovision Song Contest in 1962 and 1966.

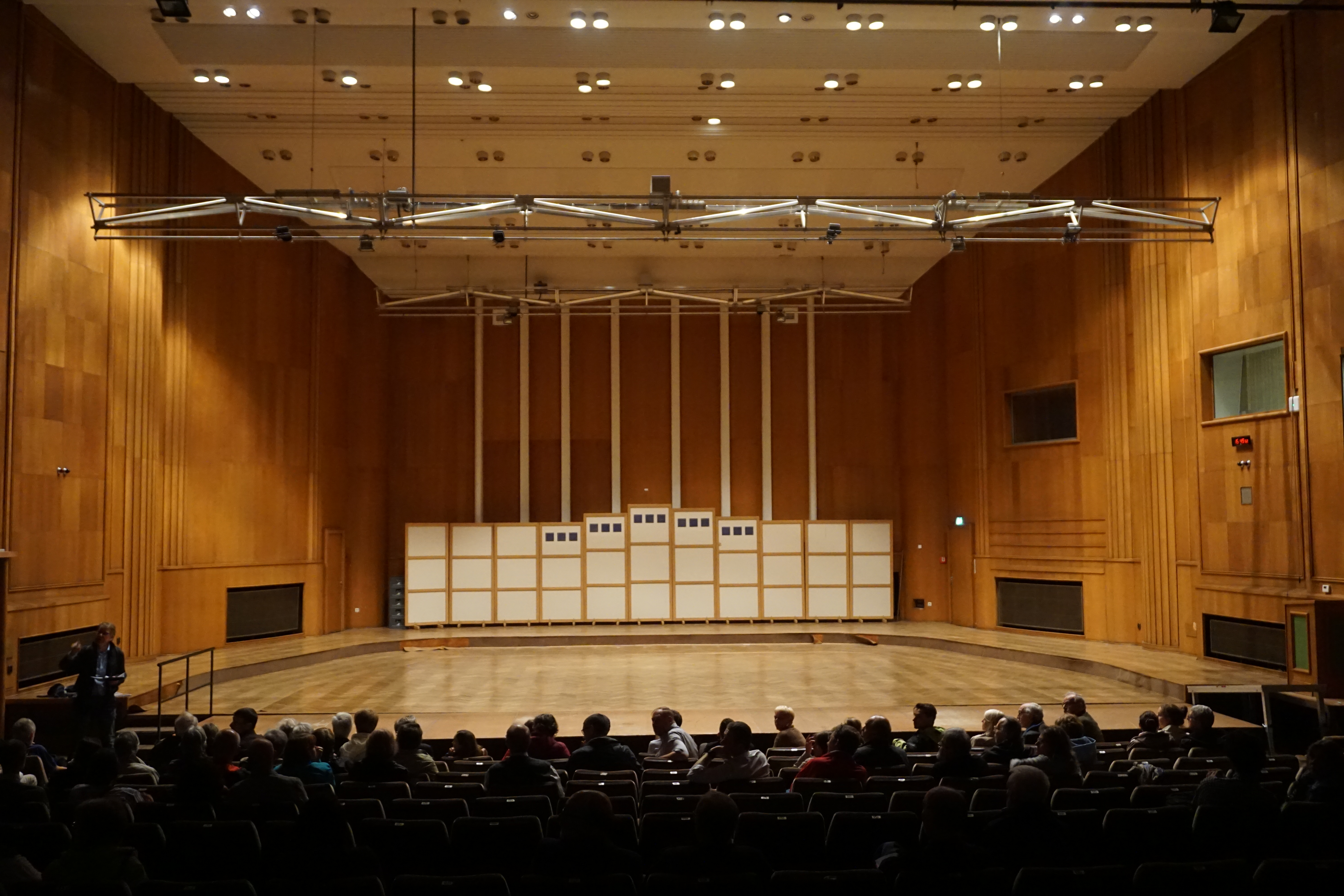
The Villa Louvigny's auditorium

The Villa Louvigny gives its name to the Louvigny section of the park, in which it is located. Best known as the historic home of RTL, Luxembourg's national television and radio broadcaster, it was most recently used as the seat of the Ministry of Health, until 2022; it is inoccupied since then.

The 8,556-square-metre (92,100 sq ft) terrain corresponding to Louvigny reduit was purchased in November 1868 for 9,600 francs, at the same auction as the Vauban reduit terrain, by engineer Joseph Simons. A clubhouse was quickly built on the terrain, and in 1869, restaurateur Adolphe Cahen opened a restaurant there; named Villa Louvigny, it was the city's first major outdoors entertainment venue. It became a popular venue, hosting concerts and theatre performances from both local and international acts, as well as lectures, auctions, film screenings and sporting events. In 1895, Jean-Pierre Klein, the owner of the villa at the time, had a 300-metre (980 ft) long, electrically lit bicycle racing track laid around the villa, along with a 200-seat grandstand. Existing until 1913, its creation is credited with popularising sport cycling in Luxembourg.

By 1913, the villa was in a dilapidated state following Klein's death, and it was purchased at an auction by home economics teacher Anne Neumann. Neumann was allowed to erect a pigsty and keep pigs and poultry at the villa from 1917 onwards; the pigsty remained through the 1920s and 1930s, to the dismay of neighbours and passersby. In a 1935 chronicle for Luxemburger Wort recounting this era of the park, author Batty Weber wrote "Then came the time when there was no longer a single spot in the whole park where a walker could take shelter in bad weather or quench their thirst. Where once cheerful laughter had mingled with the sounds of concert music, there was now a deathly silence, interrupted only briefly by the grunting from the pigsty; which had been set up at the domestic science school at the Louvigny." (Note: German: Dann kam die Zeit, da es im ganzen Park keinen Platz mehr gab, wo sich der Spaziergänger bei schlechtem Wetter unterstellen oder seinen Durst löschen konnte. Wo früher munteres Lachen sich in die Klänge der Konzertmusik gemischt hatte, war Totenstille, nur kurze Zeit unterbrochen durch das Grunzen aus dem Schweinestall; der bei der Haushaltungsschule im Louvigny eingerichtet worden war.)

In 1931, the newly created Compagnie Luxembourgeoise de Radiodiffusion (CLR), Europe's first private radio broadcaster, began renting the villa, and broadcast from it as Radio Luxembourg for the first time on 15 March 1933. It became the villa's permanent owner in 1937. After the second World War, during which Nazi occupiers seized the building and airwaves, the villa was expanded, with new premises comprising an auditorium and a tower. The expanded Villa Louvigny was inaugurated by Grand Duchess Charlotte on 18 May 1955, four days after Télé Luxembourg—the television broadcast of the Compagnie Luxembourgeoise de Télédiffusion (CLT), which had replaced CLR the year before—had begun emitting from the villa. As the home of CLT, the Villa Louvigny was the host venue for the Eurovision Song Contest, held in the grand auditorium, in 1962 and 1966.

Following the move of CLT (known by then as RTL) to larger premises in Kirchberg in the 1990s, the villa was transformed to serve as the headquarters of Luxembourg's Ministry of Health from 1998 onwards. The ministry subsequently moved to Gasperich in 2022, leaving the premises vacant; the villa is due to undergo extensive renovation to bring it to contemporary norms while leaving its appearance touched, and to reopen in 2029 as a cultural third space.

=== Sculptures and memorials ===
==== Princess Amalia Monument ====
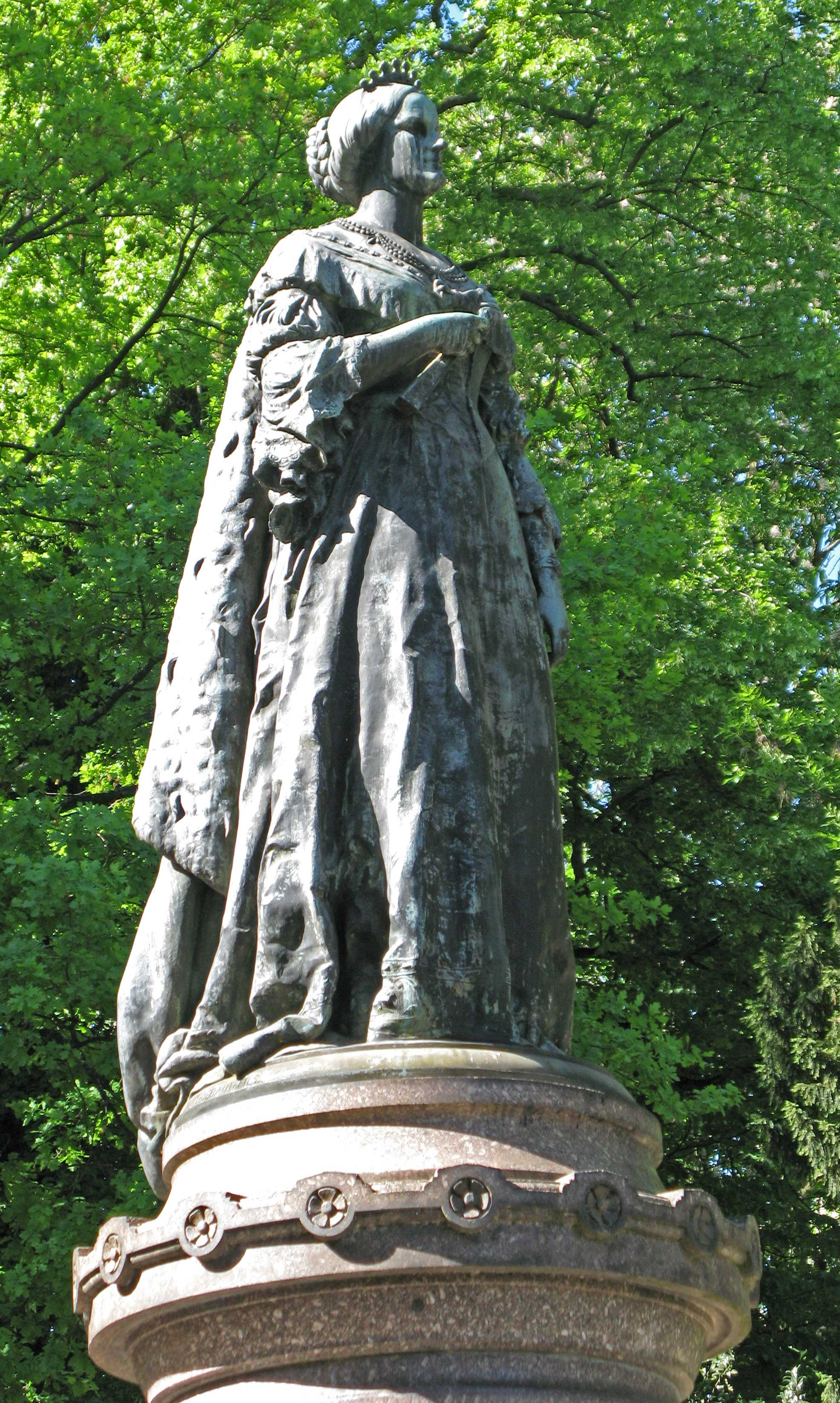
The statue of Princess Amalia of Saxe-Weimar-Eisenach, inaugurated in 1876

The Princess Amalia Monument is located on the edge of the Parc Supérieur section, at the end of a perspective axis that extends from the corner of Rue des Bains and Rue Aldringen, overlooking a garden that features flowerbeds, thirty benches and a round fountain. It consists of a 2 m (6 ft 7 in) tall bronze statue of a standing Princess Amalia of Saxe-Weimar-Eisenach (1830-1872), dressed in an ermine coat, atop a 3 m (9.8 ft) tall pedestal made of Vosges granite, placed in the centre of an exedra 10 metres (33 ft) in diametre that is built of Sauer sandstone and flanked with a bench and the engraved names of the 12 cantons of Luxembourg.

Amalia was the first wife of Prince Henry of the Netherlands, who served as Luxembourg's regent from 1850 to 1879 during the reign of his brother, King-Grand Duke William III. A popular figure in Luxembourg due to her approachability, involvement with charity and interest in the country's problems, her death from a pulmonary infection at age 42 led to an outpour of grief nationwide. Shortly thereafter, a committee was formed by several prominent local figures to call for the erection of a monument in her honour through a public subscription. The idea was met with some disapproval, however, including from William III, as it would memoralise a non-reigning princess before any present or past reigning figure; the erection of the statue of William II on Place Guillaume II was still under discussion at the time. A design contest was launched in October 1872, receiving 54 submissions, but the project stalled until 1875 due to questions over its financing.

The chosen design was submitted by French sculptor Charles Pêtre, though likely created by his student Jean Antoine Injalbert. On André's suggestion, the monument was integrated into the city park, still under construction at the time, in a cavity left over from the demolition of Fort Marie. It was inaugurated on 30 October 1876 in an elaborate ceremony attended by Prince Henry, making it the first public monument in Luxembourg.

Over time, the statue gained a black patina, earning it the nickname schwaarz Prënzessin ('black princess'), the exedra became covered in graffiti, and the two tall Weymouth pines (Pinus strobus) in front of the monument were unrooted by exceptionally strong storms in the early 1990s. In May 1999, Luxembourg City Communal Council approved a 31 million LUF restoration project, which included both the restoration of the monument and the complete redesign of its gardens, which was completed by April 2000.

==== Grand Duke Jean Monument ====
In 2021, on the 100th anniversary of the birth of Grand Duke Jean, who died in 2019, prime minister Xavier Bettel announced that the Luxembourgish government planned to erect a monument in his honour at the eastern edge of the Pescatore section of the park. Following a contest held in 2025, the winning proposal, a statue of Jean in informal wear designed by German artist on Jonas Bertemes, was presented on 3 July 2026; its inauguration is scheduled for mid-2027.

==== Busts ====
The bust of Victor Hugo in Parc Louvigny

The bust of Mahatma Gandhi, situed at the south-western entrance of the Villa Louvigny section, is the work of Indian sculptor Amarnath Sehgal, who lived in Luxembourg from 1980 to 2004. It was placed there around May 1972, and inaugurated on 21 June 1973 in the presence of Foreign Minister Gaston Thorn, mayor Colette Flesch and Indian ambassador K. B. Lall. The bust has been remarked to be a rare example of a representation of Gandhi not wearing his signature eyeglasses, and was featured on a commemorative stamp released in 2019 as a collaboration between Post Luxembourg and India Post. It was stolen from its pedestal in January 1980, shortly before an exhibition of Sehgal's work in Kirchberg, and replaced with a copy gifted by sculptor inaugurated in 1982.

The bronze bust of French writer and politician Victor Hugo, placed on a pedestal of red Gilsdorf stone, is located at the south-eastern entrance of the Villa Louvigny section, close to the pirate ship playground. A replica of the marble original by David d'Angers, it was inaugurated on 19 October 1957 in the presence of a number of prominent figures, including Grand Duchess Charlotte and former French prime minister Robert Schuman.

==== Public artworks ====
The sculpture next to the Villa Vauban, known as La grande tempérance, is the work of French-American artist Niki de Saint Phalle, a part of her Nanas series. It depicts a large, blue, idealised woman, representing an allegory of temperance. Made of hand-painted polychrome laminated polyester resin, it was realised in 1992 and acquired by the City of Luxembourg in 1995 to mark the European Year of Culture. It was initially installed on Place Émile-Hamilius in May 1995; during that year's Octave procession, pilgrims reportedly made detours to avoid the statue, which was perceived as overly sensual, and a veil was placed on the statue, allegedly by an overzealous civil servant. The statue was removed in December 2011 in anticipation of the square's transformation, and repositioned next to the nearby Hôtel des Postes in September 2019, before being moved next to the Villa Vauban in October 2021 due to renovation works on the Hôtel des Postes.

==== Memorials ====
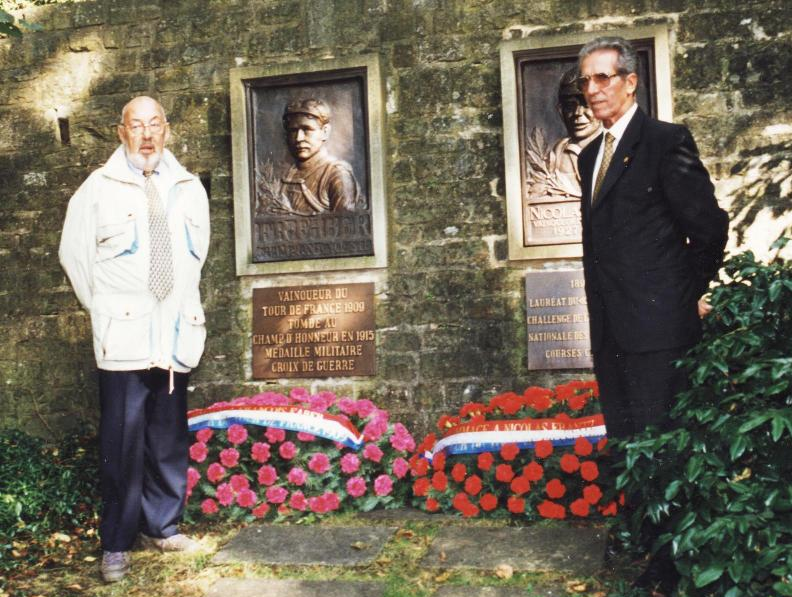
Charly Gaul and Federico Bahamontes at the Luxembourgish road cyclists' memorial—then consisting of two plaques—in 1998

In the Parc Supérieur section, between the Villa Vauban and the Luxembourg Red Cross building, four plaques commemorate prominent Luxembourgish road cyclists. The oldest plaque, originally placed at the Belair velodrome in 1924 and moved to the park on 29 June 1989, is dedicated to François Faber, the first non-French winner of the Tour de France in 1909, who joined the French Foreign Legion during World War I and was killed at Carency during the Battle of Artois. The second plaque, inaugurated on 10 September 1993, honours Nicolas Frantz (1899-1985), winner of the Tour de France in 1927 and 1928. The two other plaques, both created by Luxembourgish sculptor Yvette Gastauer-Claire, were inaugurated on 26 April 2011 and 31 May 2011 respectively; the first commemorates Elsy Jacobs (1933-1998), the first ever women's Road World Champion and a pioneer of Luxembourgish women's sports, and the second commemorates the "Angel of the Mountains" Charly Gaul (1932-2005), the winner of the 1958 Tour de France.

The "Triumph of Courage" monument near Fondation Pescatore

The "Triumph of Courage" monument, which commemorates the Battle of the Bulge, is located in the Pescatore section, close to the Fondation Pescatore building, which was used as headquarters by General George S. Patton and his Third US Army from December 1944 to March 1945. It features the flags of Belgium, the United States and Luxembourg, the seal of the Veterans of the Battle of the Bulge, and the names of all US Army divisions that took part in the battle. It was inaugurated on 8 May 2010—the 65th anniversary of V-Day—by mayor Paul Helminger, Patton's granddaughter, and a number of American veterans.

=== Flora ===
As of September 2022, the Luxembourg City Parks Service identified a total of 1,299 trees across the park's four sections, including 624 in the Parc Supérieur section, 351 in the Villa Louvigny section, 224 in the Edmond Klein section and 100 in the Pescatore section; around 20 to 25 new trees are planted each year. The most common genera are Acer (222 specimens), Tilia (146 specimens), and Quercus (101 specimens). While the exact number of trees prior to the first tree census, conducted in the early 1990s, is unknown, the park was historically much more densely forested. The park's flora has declined by 256 trees since 1991, due in part to fungal diseases, heat stress, or development, such as the removal of 30 trees to clear out the Lambert Redoubt.

==== Remarkable trees ====
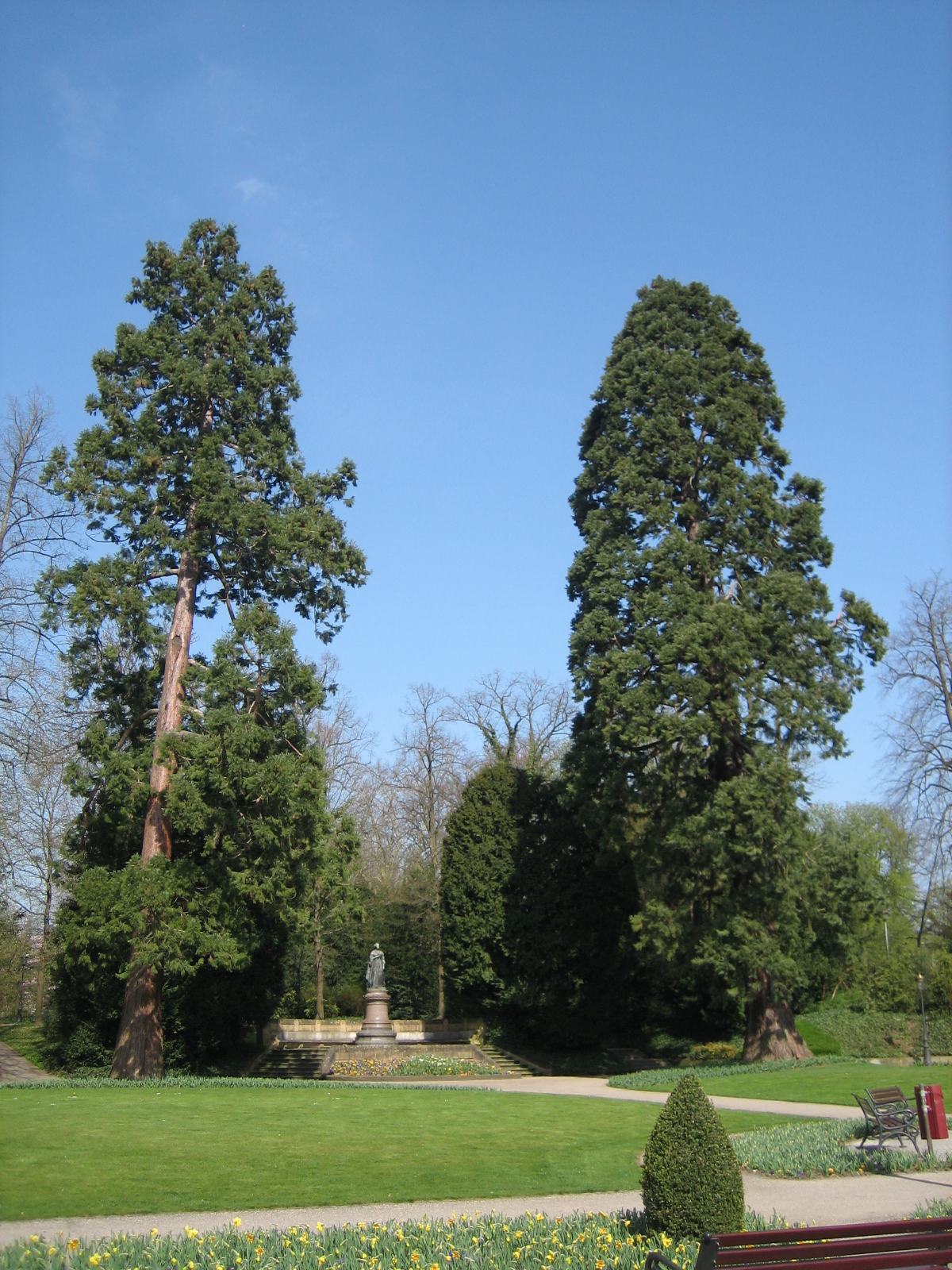
The remarkable sequoias of the Princess Amalia monument, pictured in 2009

Several of the park's trees have been designated as "remarkable trees", a label that was formalised in 2022 and which grants special protection to certain specimens for their outstanding biological, morphological or historical characteristics. A grand ducal decree of 31 January 2025 established an official list of remarkable trees for the first time, including four located in the Municipal Park.

The 'Prince Jean tree', a remarkable horse chestnut (Aesculus hippocastanum), is located on the north-eastern lawn of the Pescatore section. Measured at a diameter of 1.16 metres (3 ft 10 in) and a height of 23 metres (75 ft) as of 2002, it was planted to commemorate the birth of Prince Jean of Luxembourg—the later Grand Duke Jean—on 5 January 1921. Nearby is the 'Prince Charles tree', (Note: Not listed as a remarkable tree.) planted on 21 September 2020 to commemorate the birth of Prince Charles of Luxembourg, a great-grandson of Grand Duke Jean, who since 2025 is the presumptive heir to the throne of Luxembourg.

The 'Parc Amélie sequoias' were a pair of remarkable giant sequoias (Sequoiadendron giganteum) that stood on either side of the Princess Amalia monument in the Parc Supérieur section. Planted around 1874, likely on André's suggestion, they were assumed to be the oldest specimens in Luxembourg, and had each reached a height of 37 metres (121 ft) by 2024. One of the sequoias suffered from a fungus and began to wither in 2025; for safety reasons, it was felled in February 2026, leaving just the other one standing.

The large hornbeam (Carpinus betulus) on the Kinnekswiss was labelled as remarkable in a 2002 publication by Luxembourg's Water and Forest Administration, which referred to it as "the most spectacular specimen" in the country; it provided shade over an area of around 300 square metres (3,200 sq ft). It died in the spring of 2015 and subsequently dislocated.

=== Playground ===
The pirate ship playground near Villa Louvigny after its 2022 renovation

The park's playground is located between the Villa Louvigny and Avenue Monterey, and has an area of 4,500 square metres (48,000 sq ft). It is centred around a 30-metre (98 ft) long, 6.5-metre (21 ft) wide wooden pirate ship with a 12-metre (39 ft) tall mast, placed next to a rocky stream, a number of water games and several animals created by Luxembourgish sculptor Wil Lofy. Approved by Luxembourg City Communal Council in July 2003 to replace the park's previous playground, which had to be removed due to the construction of the Monterey underground parking garage, it was built at a cost of €1.2 million and inaugurated on 22 July 2005 by mayor Paul Helminger; at the time, it was called "one of the most modern playgrounds in Europe" by Tageblatt.

In 2021, a routine safety inspection found that the boat's wood was in poor condition, potentially impacting its safety; it was demolished in January 2022 and rebuilt nearly identically, with the bow slightly modified to deter rough sleeping. The renovation, which also included the renewal of the gravel bed the boat rests on, was completed in July 2022, at a cost of €650,000.

=== Events ===
Crowd at a jazz concert during the 2019 edition of Kinnekswiss loves...

Kinnekswiss loves... is a free open air music festival organised each year in July on the Kinnekswiss. First held in 2017, it has featured international artists like Elīna Garanča, Bryn Terfel, Stewart Copeland and Ronan Keating, performing alongside the Luxembourg Philharmonic Orchestra.

From May to October 2025, the park was one of the venues for LUGA (Luxembourg Urban Garden), a temporary urban gardening exposition held on a length of 16 kilometres (9.9 mi) across five sites in Luxembourg City and Ettelbruck. During the exhibition, the installations in the City Park included narrative and art trails, urban gardens, huts and greenhouses.

== Notes and references ==
=== Sources ===
- Beck, Fanny (July 1998). ""Princesse Amélie"" (PDF). Ons Stad (in French). No. 58. p. 17-19.
- Kirch, Roland (2024). "Trees in the City: History, species and care" (PDF). vdl.lu. Service Parcs de la Ville de Luxembourg. Archived (PDF) from the original on 11 September 2026.
- Koltz, Jean-Pierre (1949). "Der Stadtpark in Luxemburg". Luxemburger Marienkalender (in German): 63–68.
- Luja, Henri (1950). "Monographie du parc public de la ville de Luxembourg" (PDF). Bulletin de la Société des naturalistes luxembourgeois (44): 107–120.
- May, Guy (July 2014). "Festungsbau, Gastwirtschaft, Haushaltungsschule, Rundfunkstation... Die Villa Louvigny in der Chronik" (PDF). Ons Stad (in German). No. 108. p. 4-8.
- Meyer, Jean-Paul (2019). Charly : Schmalspurbahn Luxemburg-Echternach 1904-1954 (in German). Luxembourg City: Gérard Klopp. ISBN 978-99959-38-01-7.
- Philippart, Robert L. (2006). Luxembourg, de l'historicisme au modernisme - de la ville forteresse à la capitale nationale (in French). Steinsel: Éditions Ilôts. ISBN 978-2-87996-738-7.
- Philippart, Robert L. (January 2011). "Luxembourg : Edouard André bouscule le plan de Louis Fuchs" (PDF). Association Edouard André: 4–8.
- Philippart, Robert L. (April 2012). "1867-1920: Stadt- oder Staatsplanung für das neue Luxemburg?" (PDF). Ons Stad (in German). No. 99. p. 14-19.
- Philippart, Robert L. (May 2025). "L'œuvre d'Edouard André — Genèse, conservation et disparition" (PDF). Ons Stad (in French). No. 131. p. 14-19.
- Ries, Richard (November 1979). "Aus der Geschichte des Stadtparks" (PDF). Ons Stad (in German). No. 2. p. 19-22. Archived (PDF) from the original on 31 July 2026.
- Schoellen, Marc (July 1998a). "Edouard André, architecte-paysagiste, 1840-1911" (PDF). Ons Stad (in French). No. 58. p. 5-7.
- Schoellen, Marc (July 1998b). "Le parc et les promenades de la ville de Luxembourg" (PDF). Ons Stad (in French). No. 58. p. 2-4.
- Sinner, Jean-Marie; Moes, Marc; Bechet, Georges; Erasmy, Frank (2002). Les arbres remarquables (in French). Luxembourg City: Administration des eaux et forêts / Musée national d'histoire naturelle. ISBN 2-919877-05-4.
- Yegles-Becker, Isabelle (July 1998). "Parcs et espaces verts: L'invention du promeneur" (PDF). Ons Stad (in French). No. 58. p. 11-16.
- Yegles-Becker, Isabelle (April 2010). "La villa Vauban - Symbole de culture et d'identité historique" (PDF). Ons Stad (in French). No. 93. p. 16-19. Archived (PDF) from the original on 19 August 2026.
