= Hamilius: Hip Hop Culture in Luxembourg =

- Alain Tshinza
- Directed by: Alain Tshinza
- Written by: Alain Tshinza
- Produced by: Raoul Nadalet
- Cinematography: Alex Aach; Ricardo Besantini; Amandine Klee; Philippe Lussagnet; Carlo Thiel
- Edited by: Jean-Luc Simon
- Music by: DUL; CHI
- Production company: Antevita Films
- Distributed by: Antevita Films
- Release date: March 19, 2010
- Running time: 94 minutes
- Country: Luxembourg
- Languages: Luxembourgish; French

Hamilius: Hip Hop Culture in Luxembourg is a 2010 documentary film directed by Alain Tshinza and produced by Luxembourgish production company Antevita Films.

This film premiered 18 March 2010 at the Utopolis in Luxembourg City. The film is entirely spoken in Luxembourgish and French, but English subtitles are shown.

== Synopsis ==
In the 2010 documentary "Hamilius: Hip Hop Culture in Luxembourg" a production of Antevita Films. Produced by Raoul Nadalet and directed by Alain Tshinza, the movie showcases the growth of the culture through the 1980s, 1990s and 2000s in the small country of Luxembourg. Centered around the Four elements of hip hop (Breakdance, Graffiti, Rap and DJing) the movie follows local practitioners from the different generations and gives an in-depth view of a culture that is often associated with violence and juvenile delinquency.

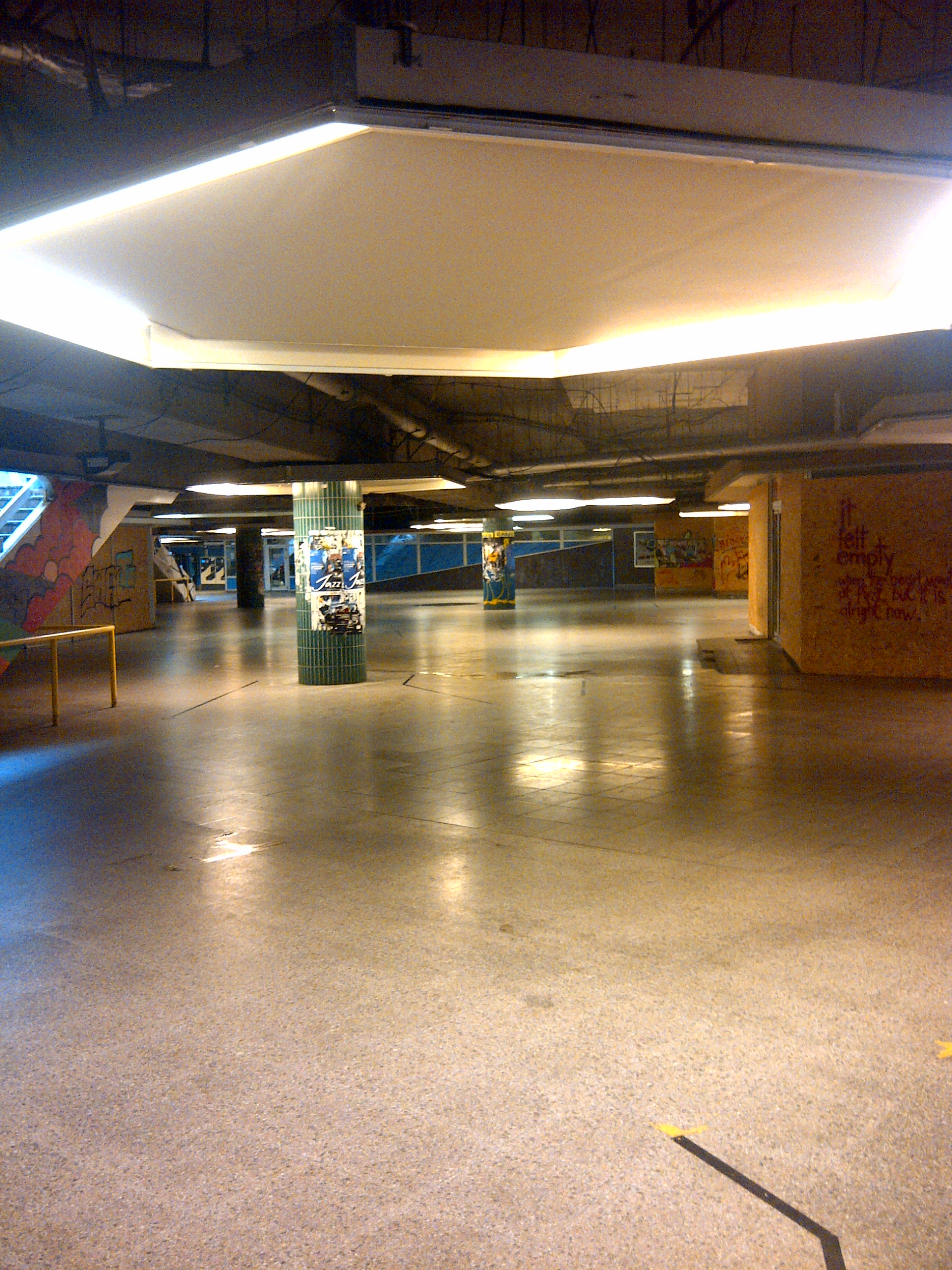
The Passage under the Hamilius square.

The documentary is named after the former underground passage under Place Émile-Hamilius which became a meeting point for dancers and members of the local hip-hop scene. The film offers an interesting angle on Luxembourgish culture and language through several generations of an art scene and movement which has seen its active members grow to positions as scholars, professors, entrepreneurs and journalists, coming from a space that is often swept under the rug.

== Cast ==
- Project X
- Tom Mahnen
- Nikki Etikwa Ikuku
- Sputnix
- JMP
- CHI
- LX Team
- Cool Brebs & Systematic Crew
- DJ Mike MC
- Sloggy
- Andre Haagen
- DJ Kwistax
- All Schools Collectif
- Spike
- Kaos
- Stick
- Sumo
- Giamba
- DJ Jean Maron
- DJ Mätti
- Fail
- Opposition
- Foundation
- Z-Town Massiv
- Valkila
- De Läb

== See also ==
- Cinema of Luxembourg
