= Lambert Redoubt =

Coordinates: 49°36′36″N 6°07′25″E

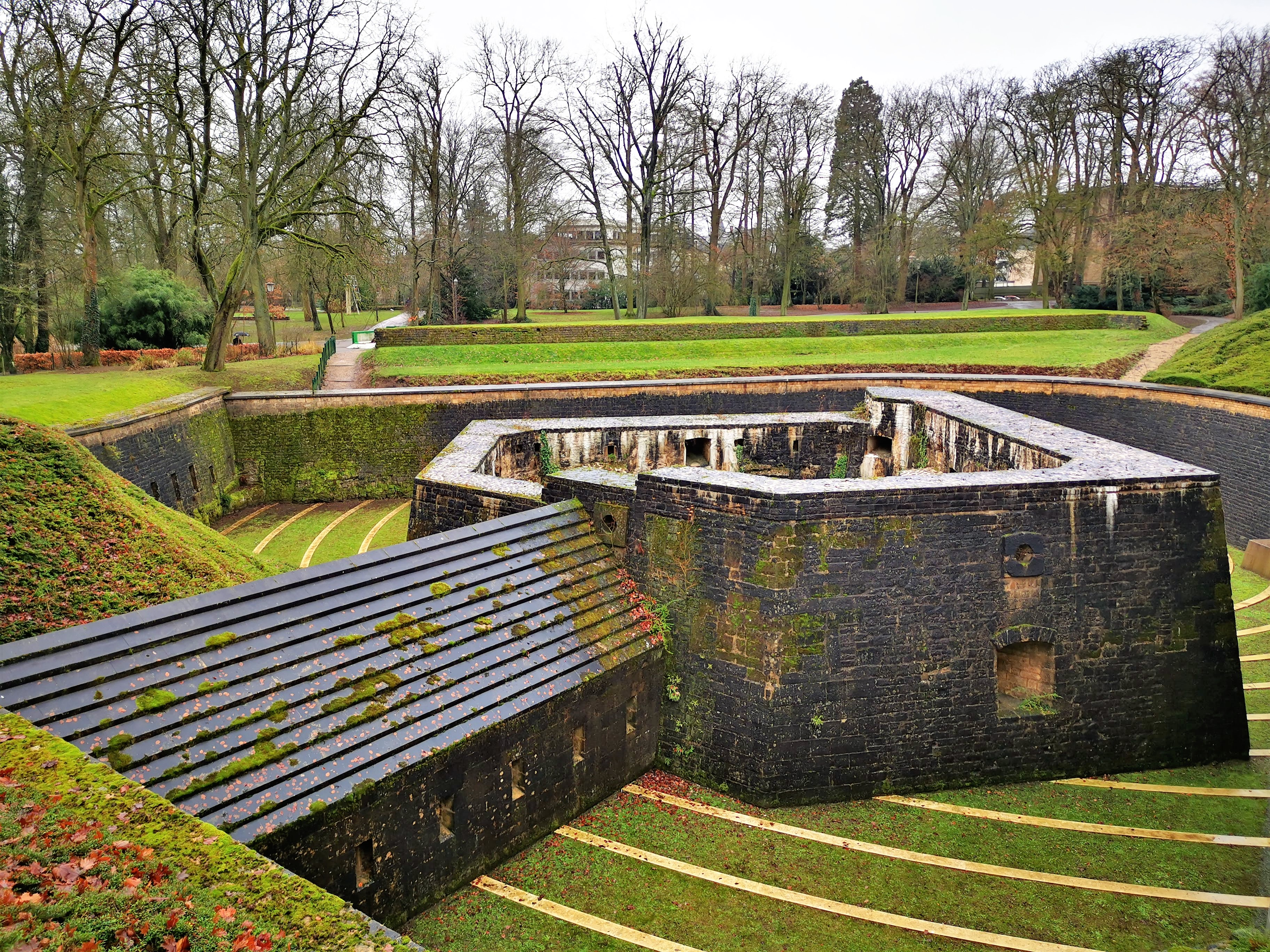
Remains of Fort Lambert

The Lambert Redoubt is part of a seventeenth-century fort in the Municipal Park, Luxembourg City. The fort was demolished between 1868 and 1874, and the redoubt was not discovered until the city was excavating for the Monterey underground car park.

The structure can be viewed from above from Avenue Monterey, or accessed from within the municipal park surrounding it.
