= Villa Vauban =

Coordinates: 49°36′47″N 06°07′21″E

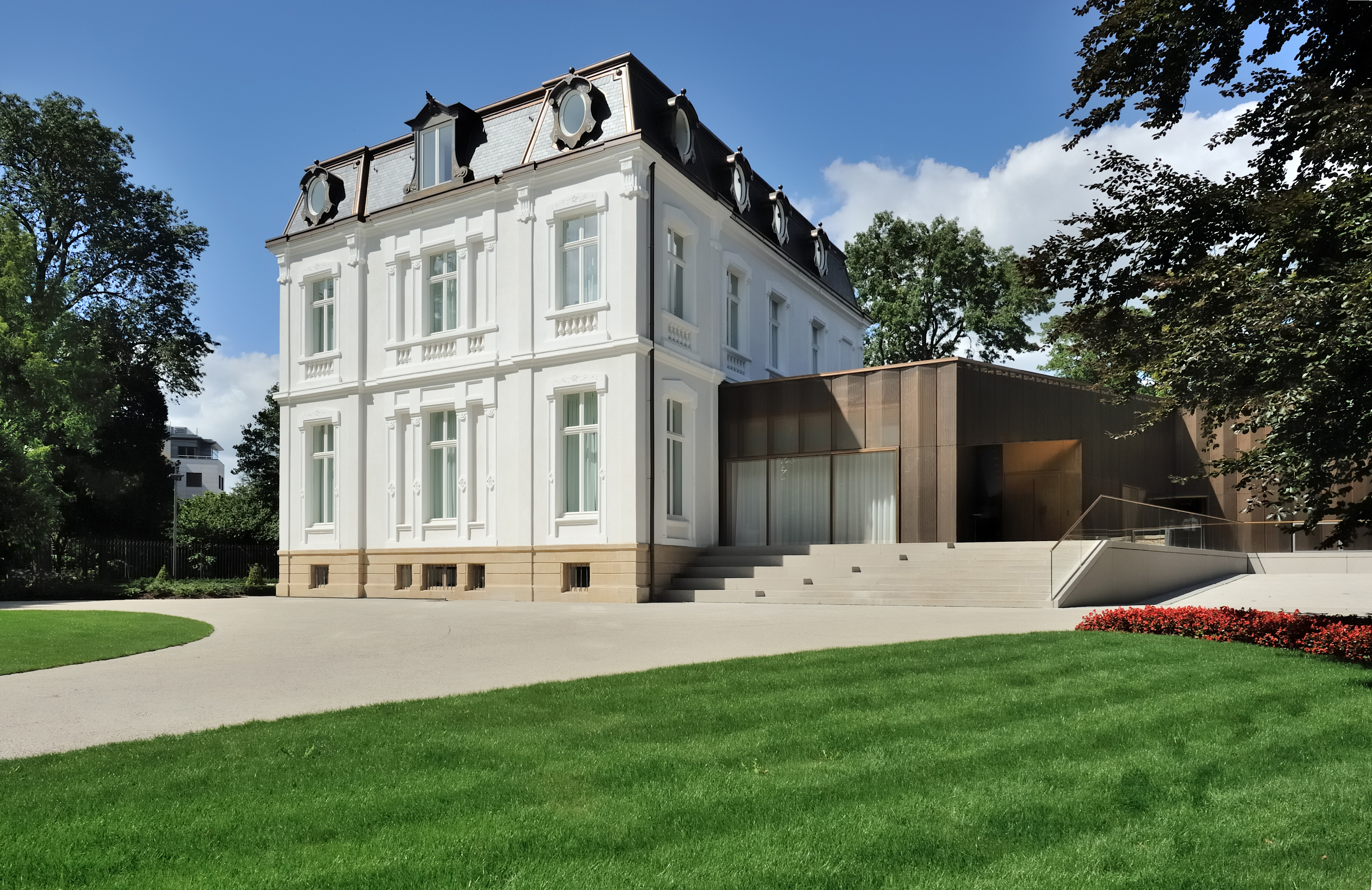

- Location within Luxembourg
- Location: Luxembourg City, Luxembourg
- Type: Art museum
- Website: villavauban.lu/en/

The Villa Vauban is an art museum in Luxembourg City. It exhibits 18th- and 19th-century paintings acquired from private collections.

== Background ==
Built in 1873 as a private residence, the villa owes its name to a fort built on the same site by Sébastien Le Prestre de Vauban (1633–1707) as part of the city's defences. An impressive section of the old fortress wall can be seen in the museum's basement. The renovation work, completed in 2010, was planned by Philippe Schmit of the Luxembourg architectural firm Diane Heirent & Philippe Schmit. As a result of its innovative perforated copper cladding, the extension received the TECO Architecture Award in 2010. The museum is located in a park laid out by the French architect Édouard André (1840–1911), one of the leading landscape architects of his day.

== History ==
Designed by city architect Jean-François Eydt, the residence was built by an Alsacian glove manufacturer, Gabriel Mayer, in a classical 19th-century style with a Neoclassical facade. It was located on a large plot which became available after the city's fortifications were demolished, providing room not only for the residence and its stables but also for an extensive French-style garden. In 1874, it was acquired by steel manufacturer Charles Joseph de Gargan and his wife Emilie Pescatore, before being passed on to their daughter Anne-Marie de Gargan and her husband, the industrialist Norbert Le Gallais, in 1912. During World War II, the villa was seized by Nazi occupiers and housed the ministry of agriculture and pricing authority. After the war, it was briefly the residence of Henriette Pescatore and her husband, future prime minister Pierre Werner.

In 1949, the villa was put up for auction by the heirs of the Le Gallais de Gargan family, and bought by the City of Luxembourg for 5 million francs, with the aim of providing home for the city's art collection. However, with Luxembourg playing an important diplomatic role as the temporary seat of the institutions of the European Coal and Steel Community (ECSC), the villa housed the ECSC Court of Justice from 1952 to 1959; due to its insufficient size, an extension of the villa was planned as early as 1953, but never built. In 1959, it was converted once again in order to house the art collections which are still exhibited there today. The villa served as the official residence of Grand Duke Jean and Grande Duchess Joséphine Charlotte from 1991 to 1995 while renovation work was being carried out at the Grand Ducal Palace.

== Collections ==
The works exhibited at the Villa Vauban were originally part of three separate collections, all of which were bequeathed to the city. The first is that of Jean-Pierre Pescatore (1793–1855), who established himself as a wealthy banker in Paris. It is made up principally of 17th-century Dutch paintings, contemporary French works, as well as sculptures and drawings. The second, consisting mainly of 19th-century art, stems from Leo Lippmann (1808–1883), a banker and Consul General of Luxembourg in Amsterdam. The third collection, which once belonged to the pharmacist Jodoc Frédéric Hochhertz, comprises 18th century history paintings, still lifes and portraits. It was later inherited by Eugénie Dutreux-Pescatore (1810–1902). The Dutch Golden Age paintings include works by Cornelis Bega, Gerrit Dou and Jan Steen while Eugène Delacroix, Jean-Louis-Ernest Meissonier and Jules Dupré are among the artists who painted the 19th-century French works.

== See also ==
- List of museums in Luxembourg
- Culture of Luxembourg
