= Place Émile-Hamilius =

Square in Luxembourg City

Coordinates: 49°36′39.5″N 06°07′36″E

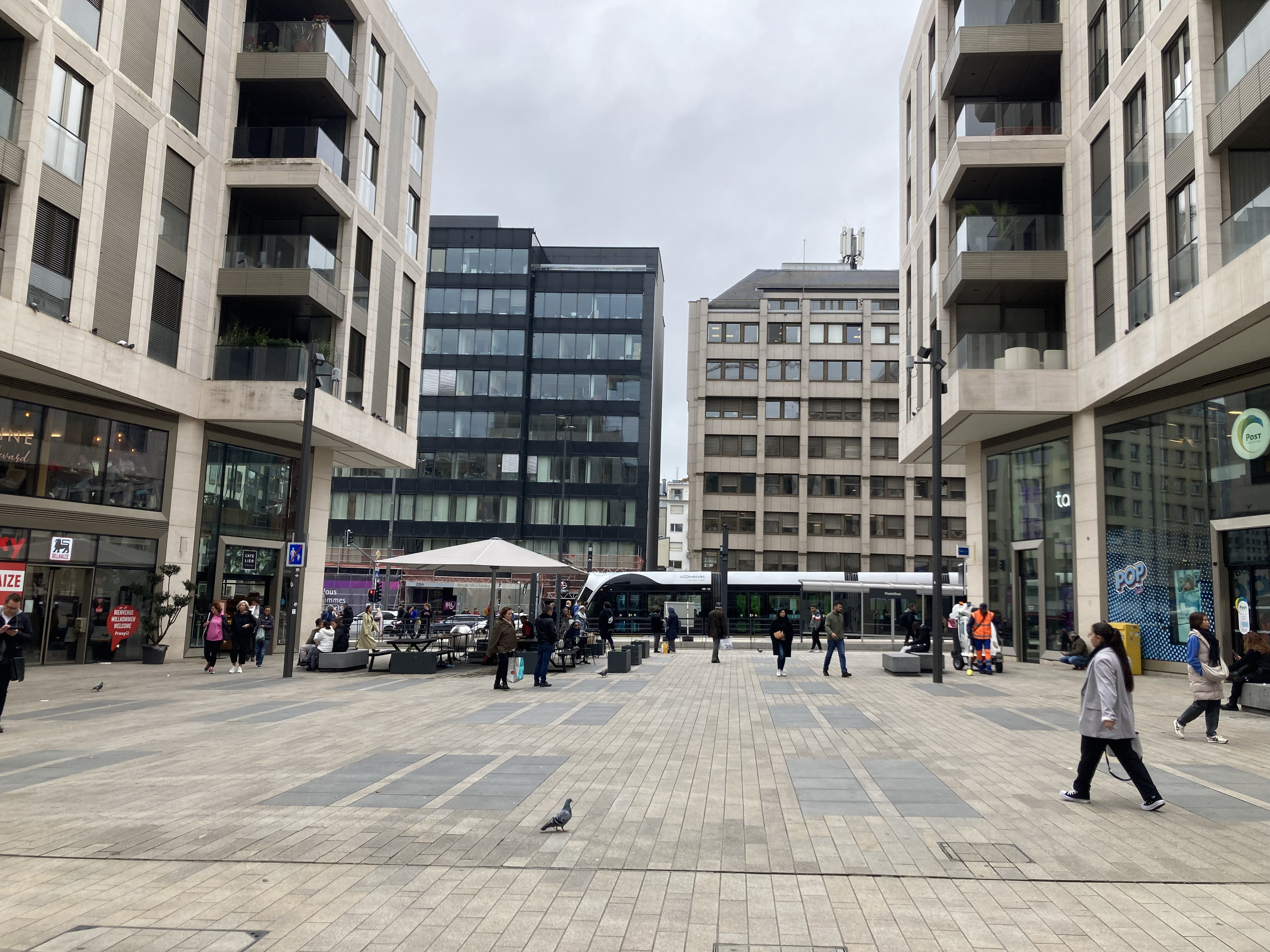
The square in October 2024.

Place Émile-Hamilius is a square in the Ville Haute district of Luxembourg City, located between the Boulevard Royal and Rue Aldringen. It is served by the Hamilius stop on the T1 line of the Luxembourg City tramway. The square is named after Luxembourgish footballer and politician Émile Hamilius (1897-1971), who was mayor of Luxembourg City from 1946 to 1963.

== History ==
=== Aldringerschoul ===
From 1884 to 1974, the square was the site of the Aldringen Primary School (known in Luxembourgish as the Aldringerschoul), designed by Luxembourgish architect Antoine Luja on the advice of Parisian expert Félix Narjoux. From 30 August to 28 September 1914, the school notably served as the headquarters of the German army during the First Battle of the Marne.

=== Centre Émile-Hamilius ===
The school was demolished in May 1974, when Luxembourg City's development as a financial centre made it obsolete. In its place, the municipal authorities commissioned architects René Schmit, André Haagen and Jean Ewert to build the Centre Émile-Hamilius (or Centre Aldringen), at a cost of 230 million francs, which was finally inaugurated on 9 March 1979. The building complex was mainly used by municipal services, including the municipal library, and, from 2001, the citizens' reception centre (Bierger-Center). Next to it was a major bus station, which opened on 12 September 1977 and served as one of the main nodes of the Luxembourg City bus network. Under the Boulevard Royal, a large underground passageway and shopping arcade was built, which later became an important site for hip hop culture in Luxembourg, and was the subject of the documentary Hamilius: Hip Hop Culture in Luxembourg in 2010.

=== Royal-Hamilius ===
In 2015, the bus station, the Centre Émile-Hamilius and several of the buildings around it were demolished, with the exception of the apartment building at 49, Boulevard Royal, built in 1962 and whose demolition was opposed by two of its owners. The square was then redeveloped as part of the Royal-Hamilius project, a real estate and commercial complex designed by the British architectural firm Foster and Partners, dominated by a Galeries Lafayette department store and open from 2019. The Luxembourg City tramway, which ran on Boulevard Royal until 1964, returned to it in December 2020, serving the Hamilius stop.

== Image gallery ==
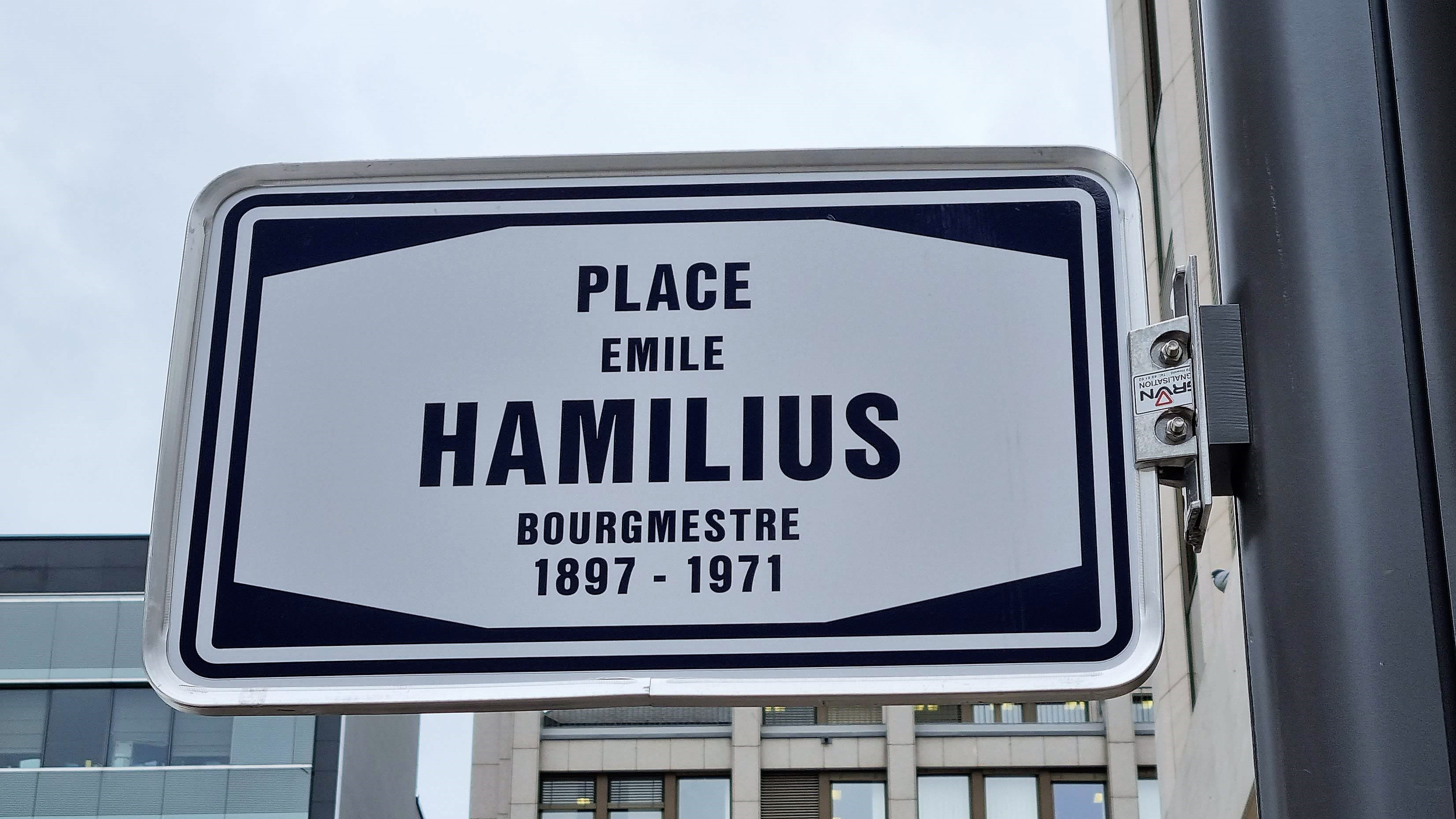
A street sign on the square

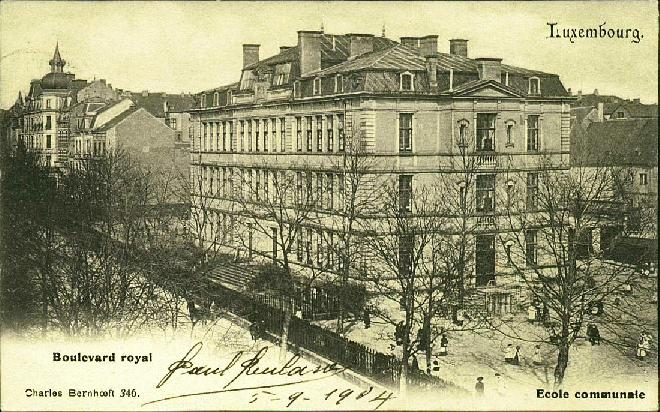
The Aldringen school in 1904

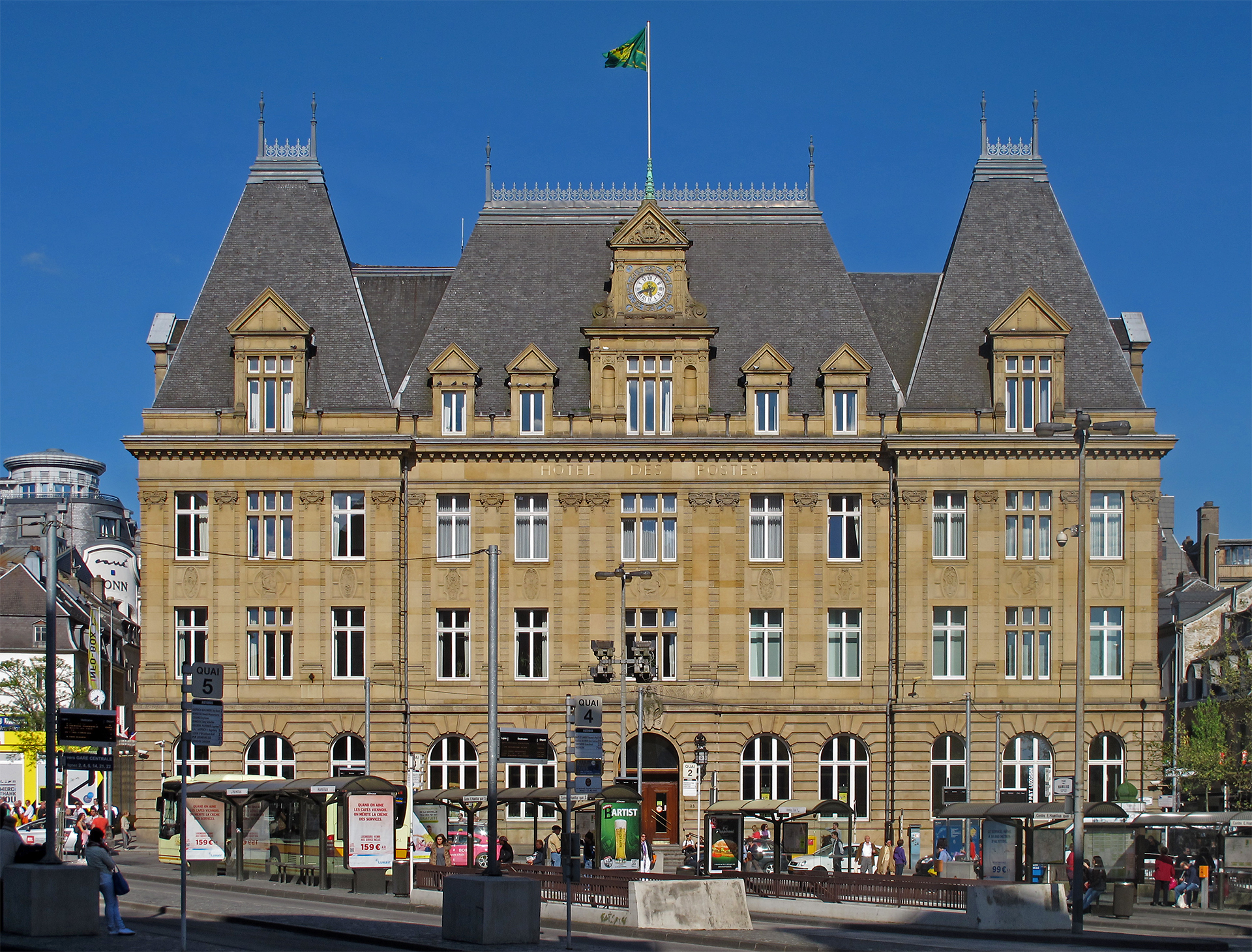
The post office and the former bus station

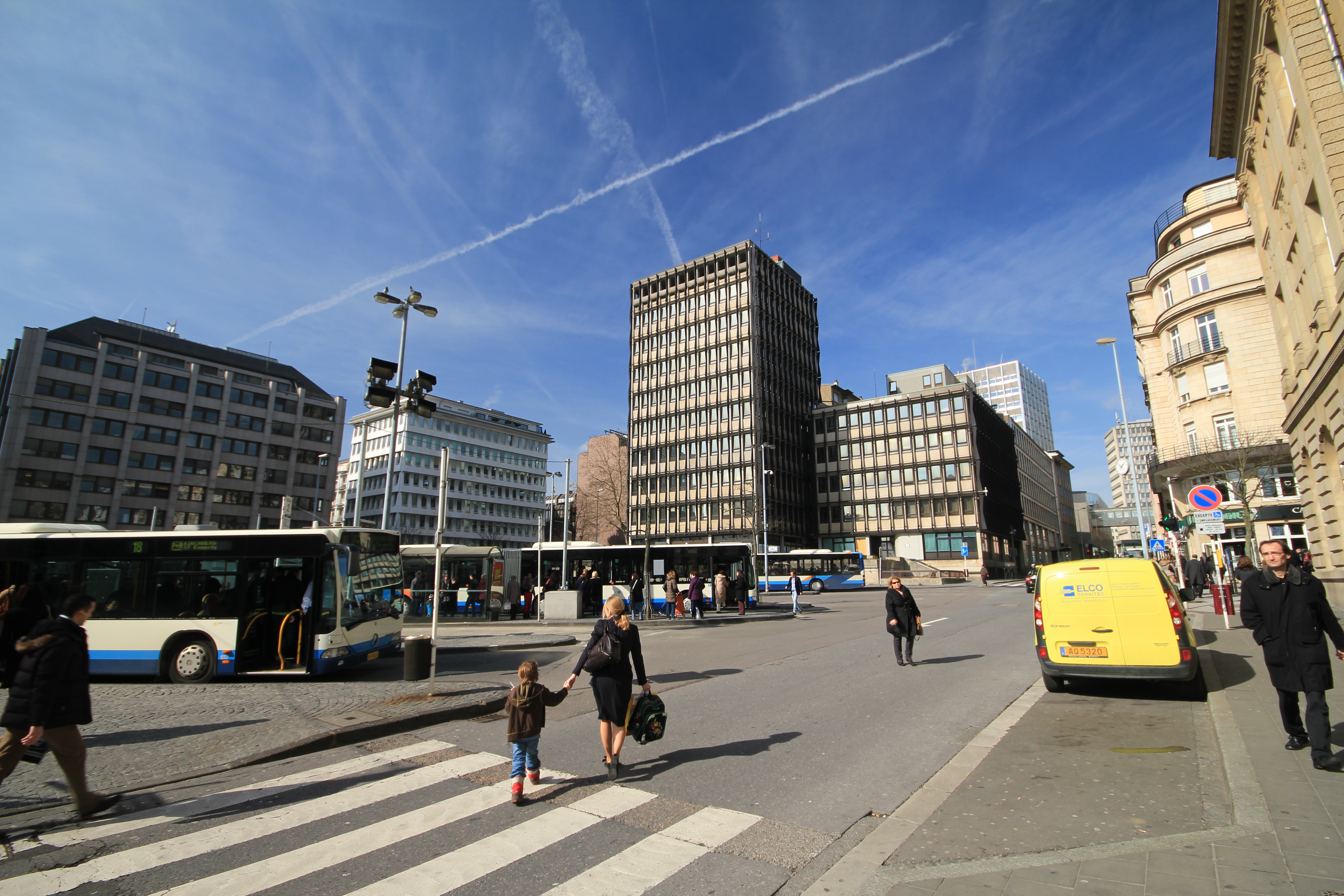
Centre Hamilius before its demolition

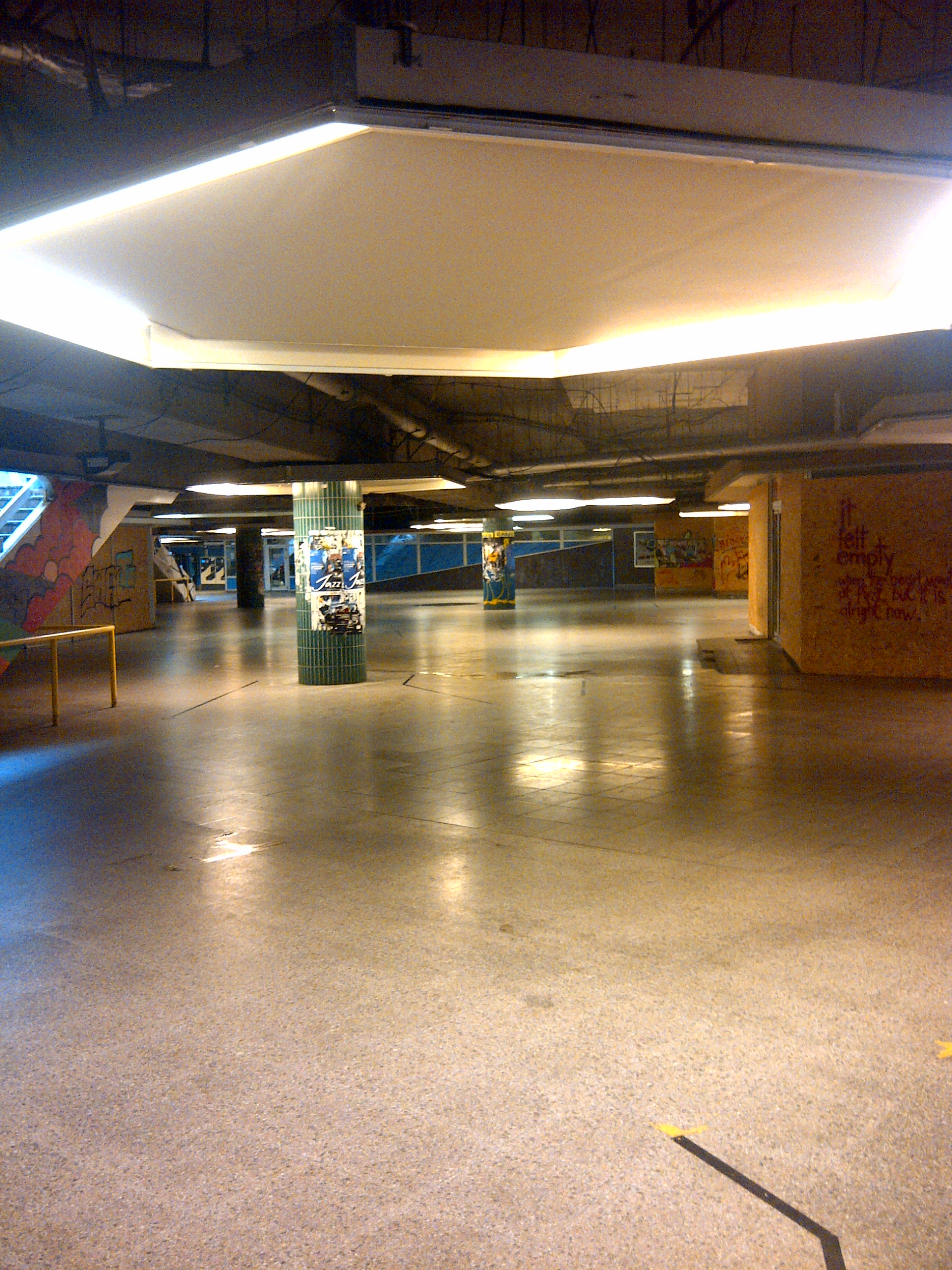
The underground passageway shortly before its closure

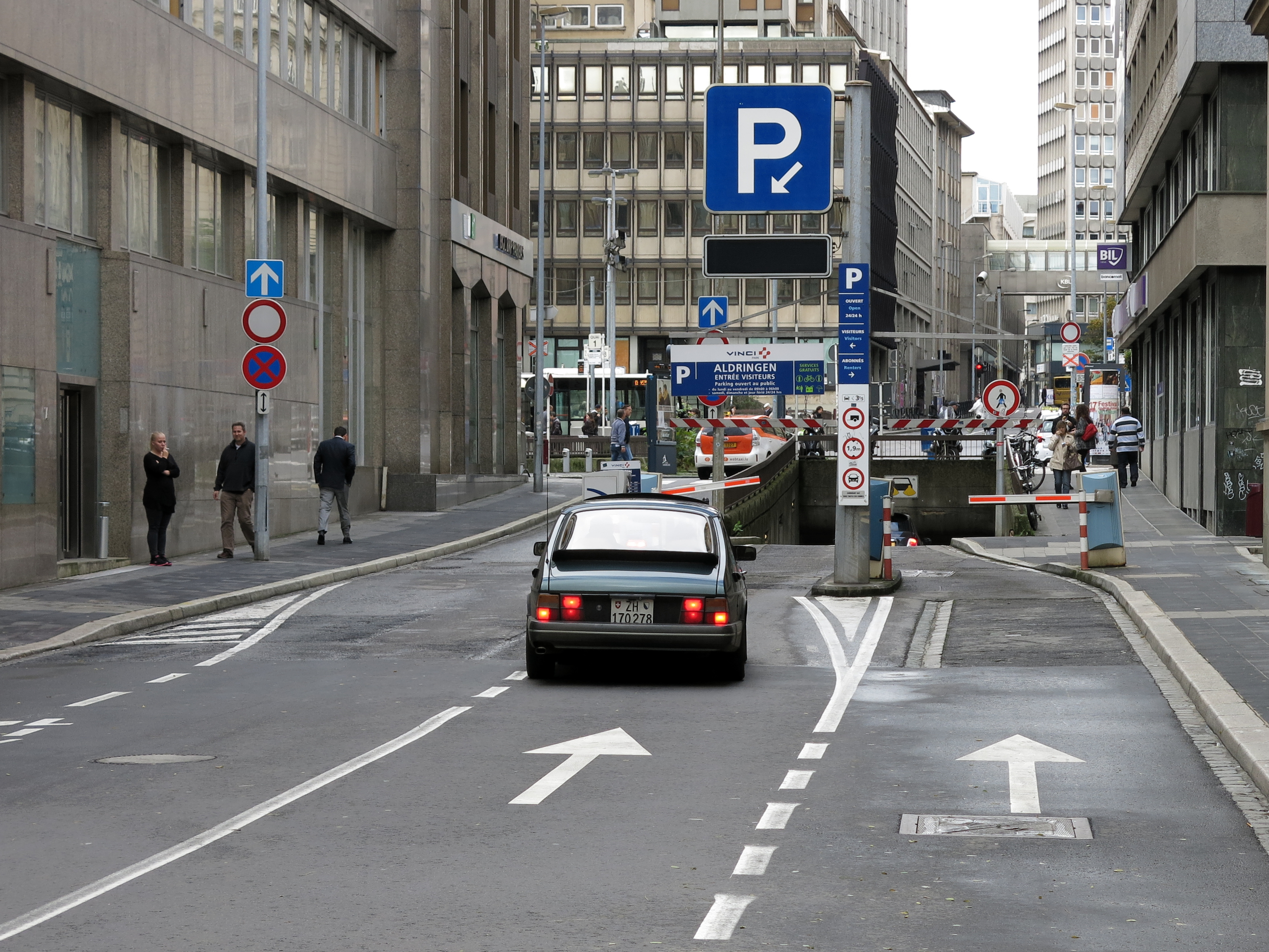
Entrance to the former Aldringen underground parking garage

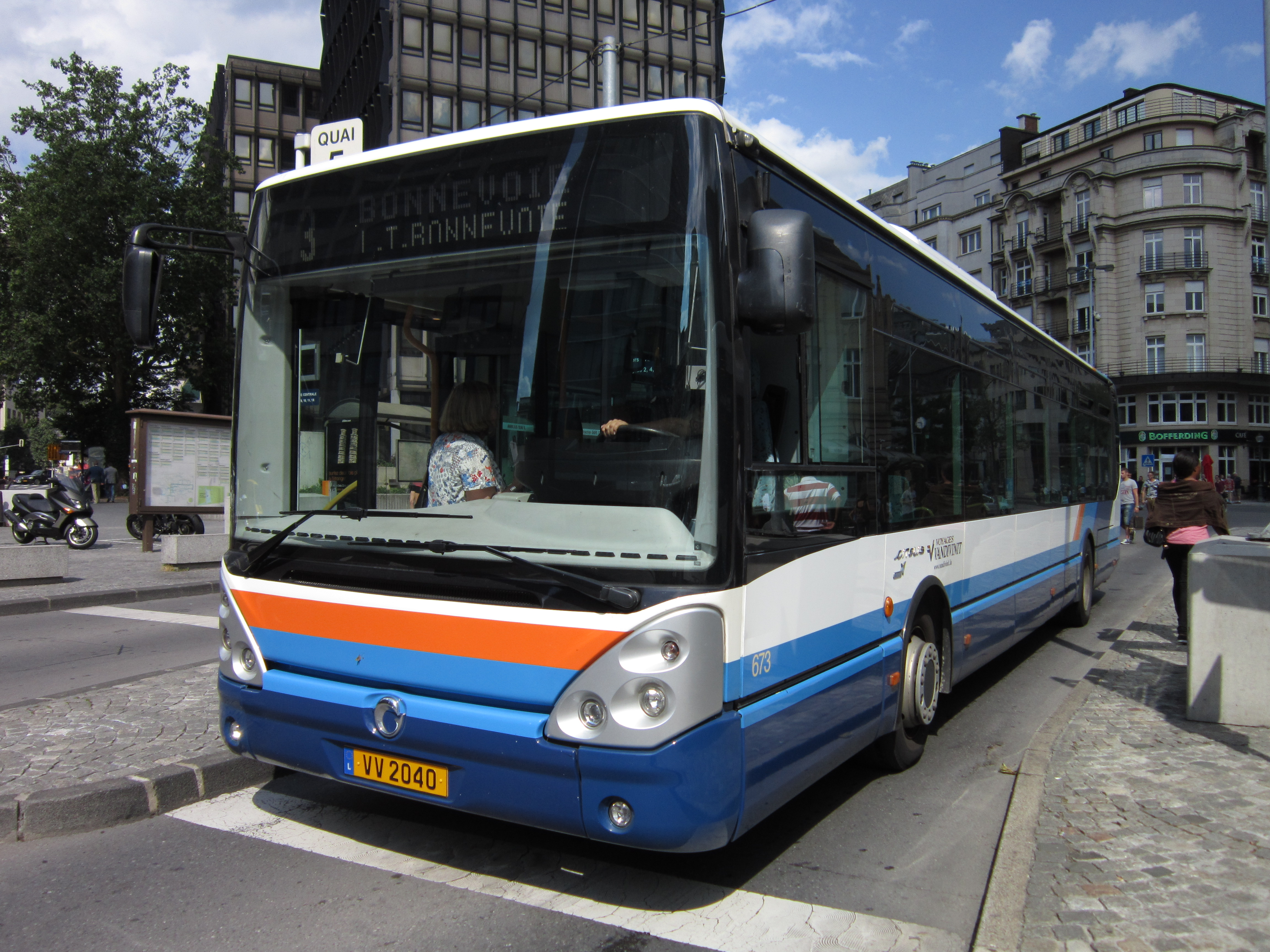
A Luxembourg City bus at the bus station

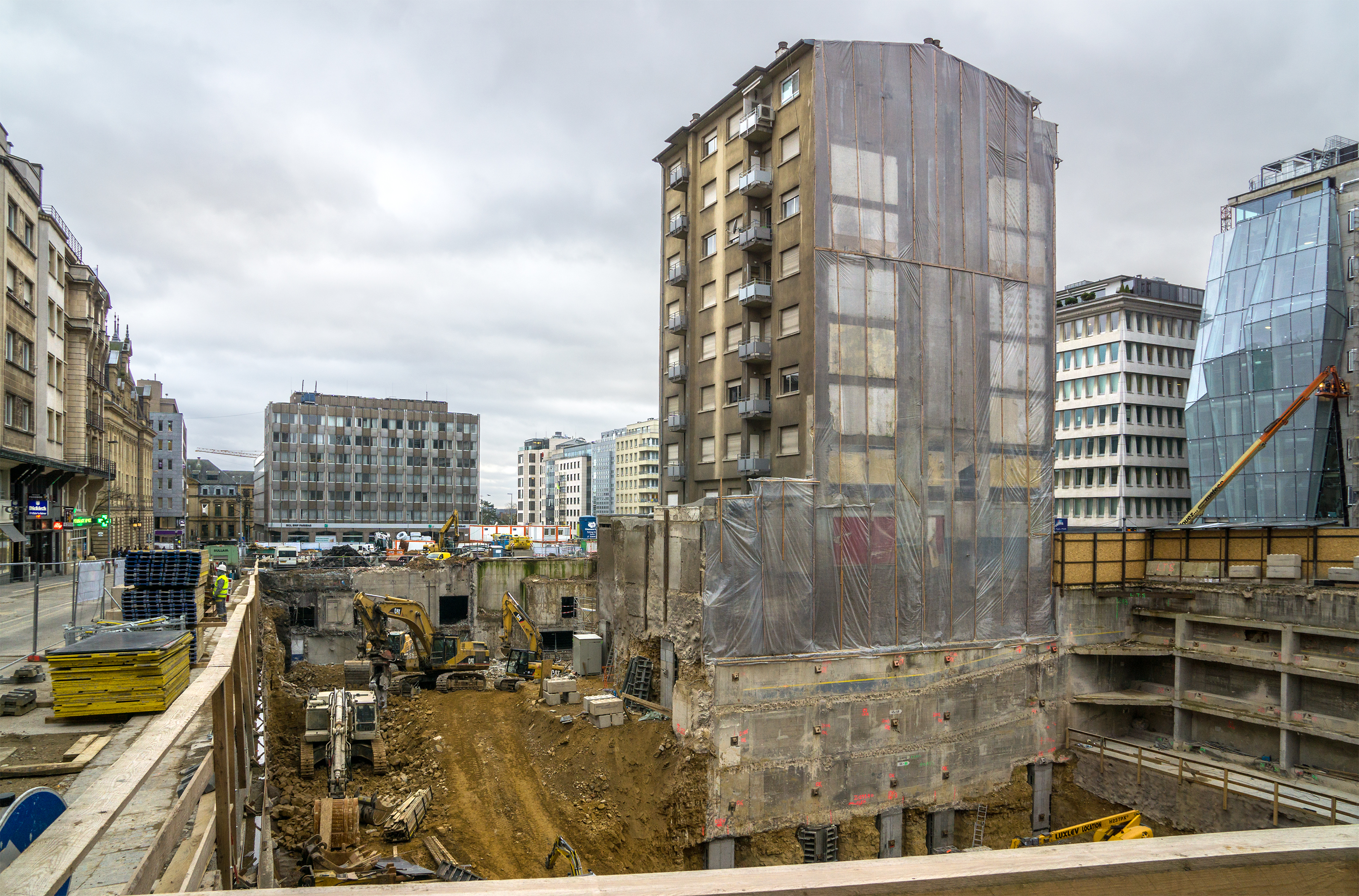
Construction of Royal-Hamilius in 2016, surrounding the untouched building at 49, Boulevard Royal

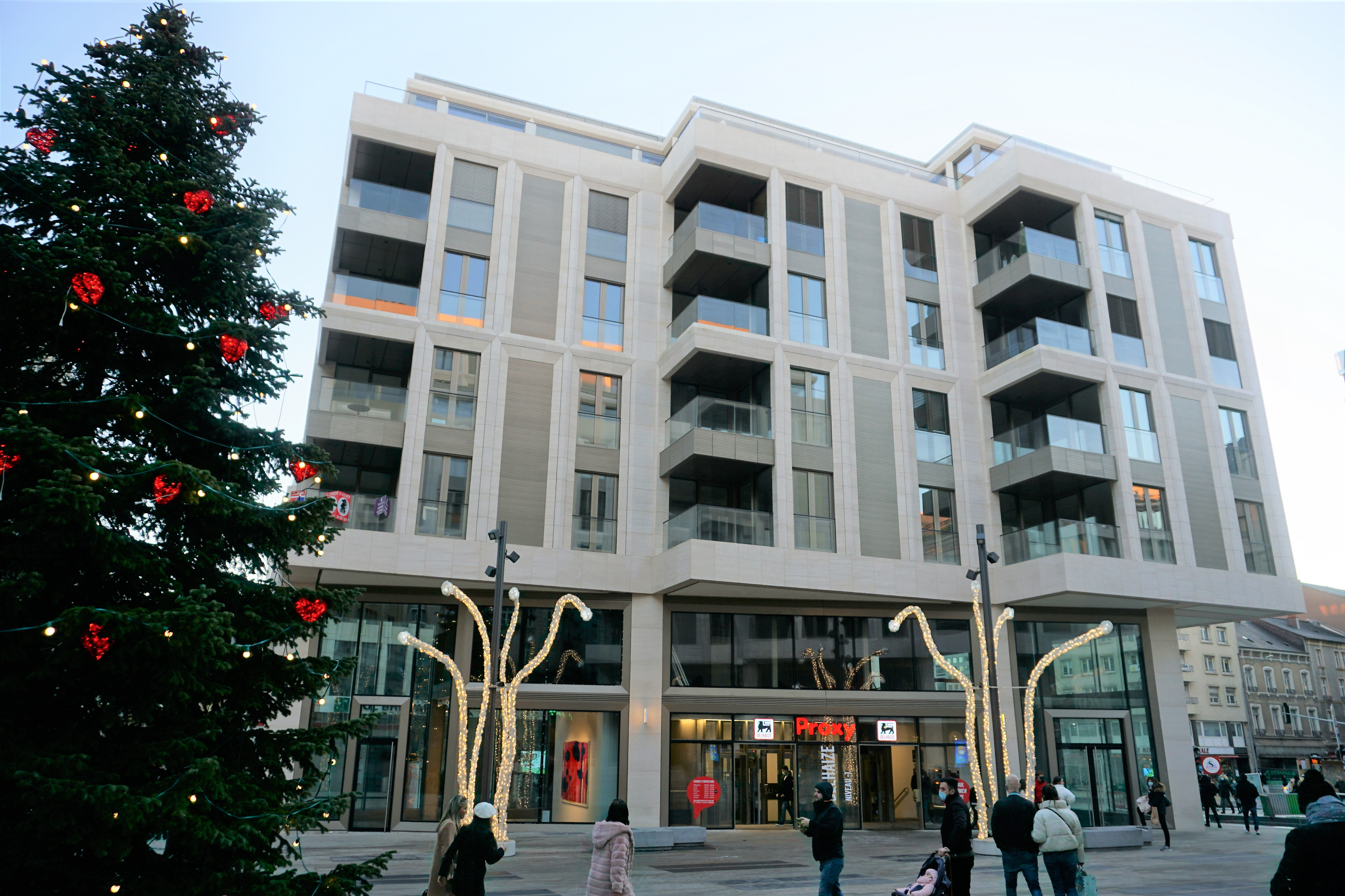
A building of the Royal-Hamilius complex

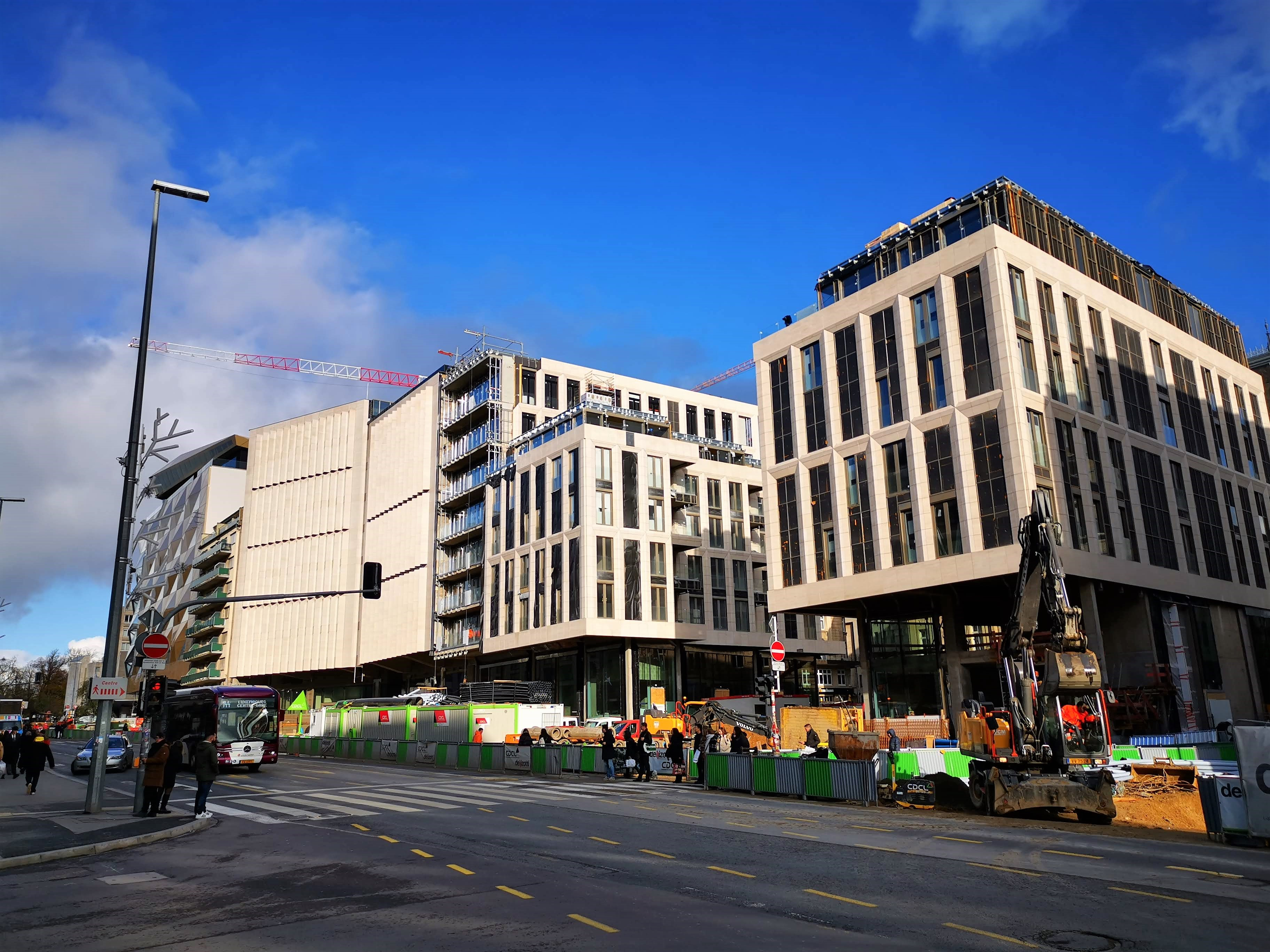
The Royal-Hamilius complex at the end of construction

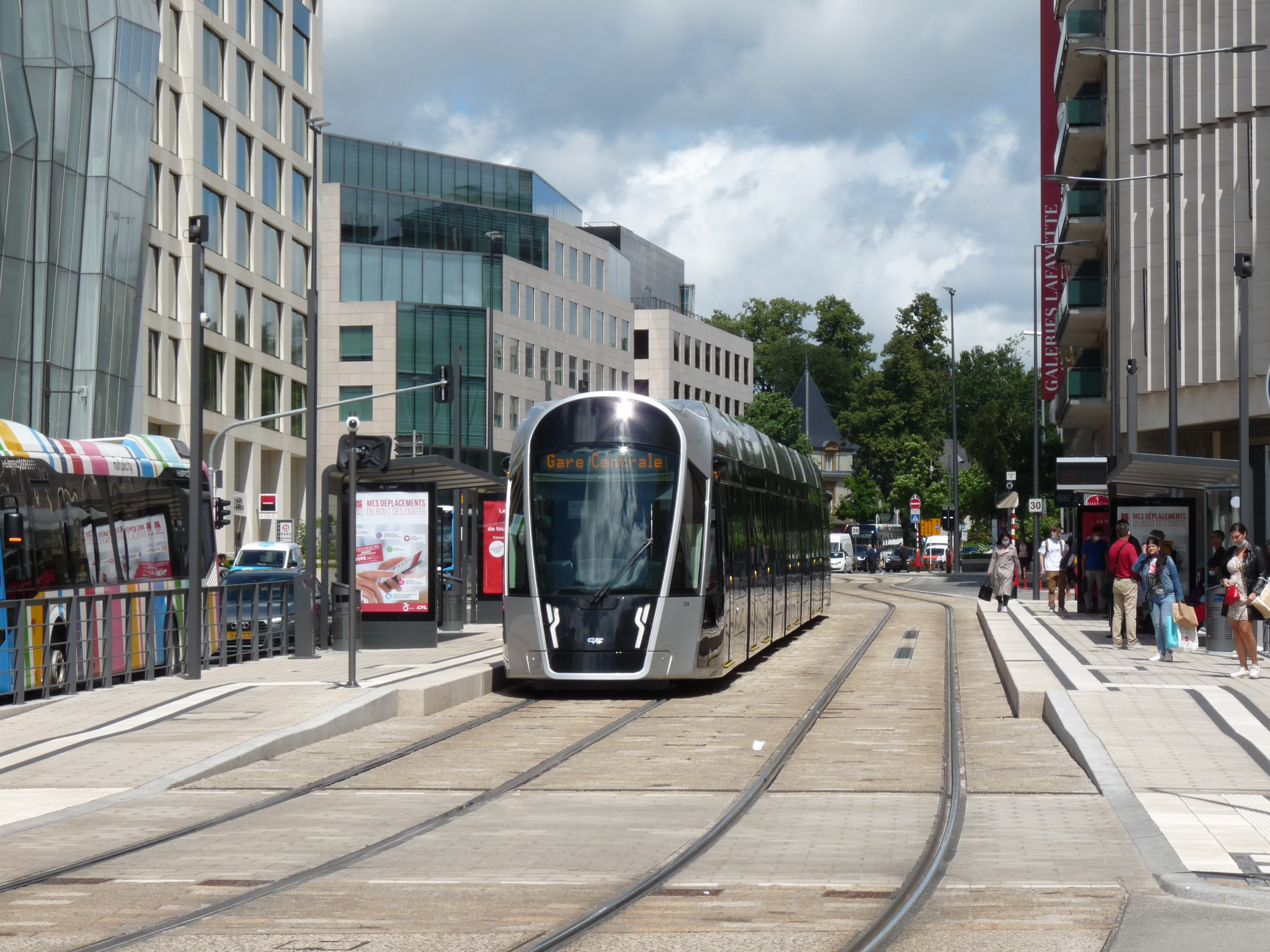
The tram stop

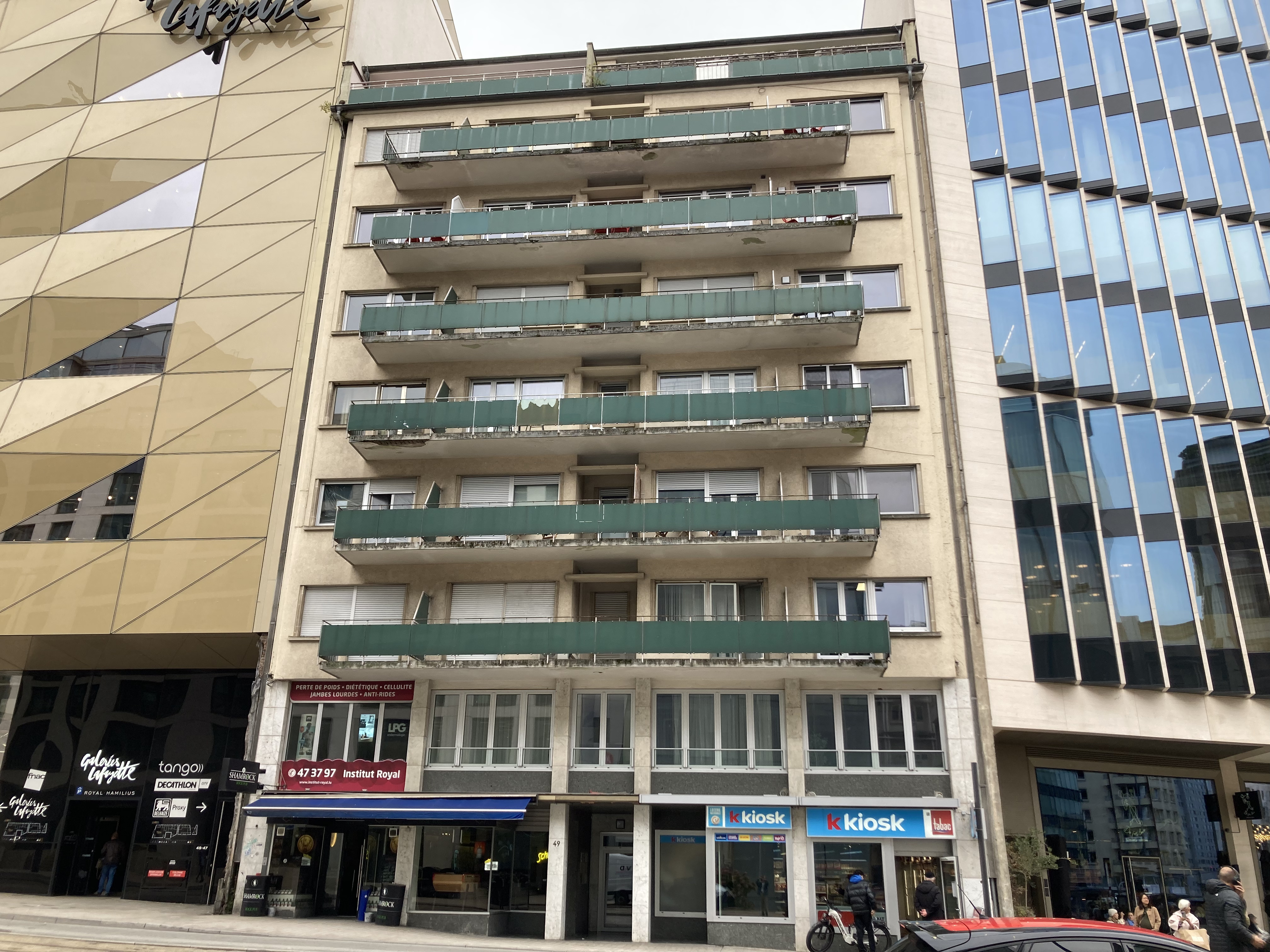
49, boulevard Royal, which the Royal-Hamilius complex had to be built around
