= Jean-Pierre Pescatore =

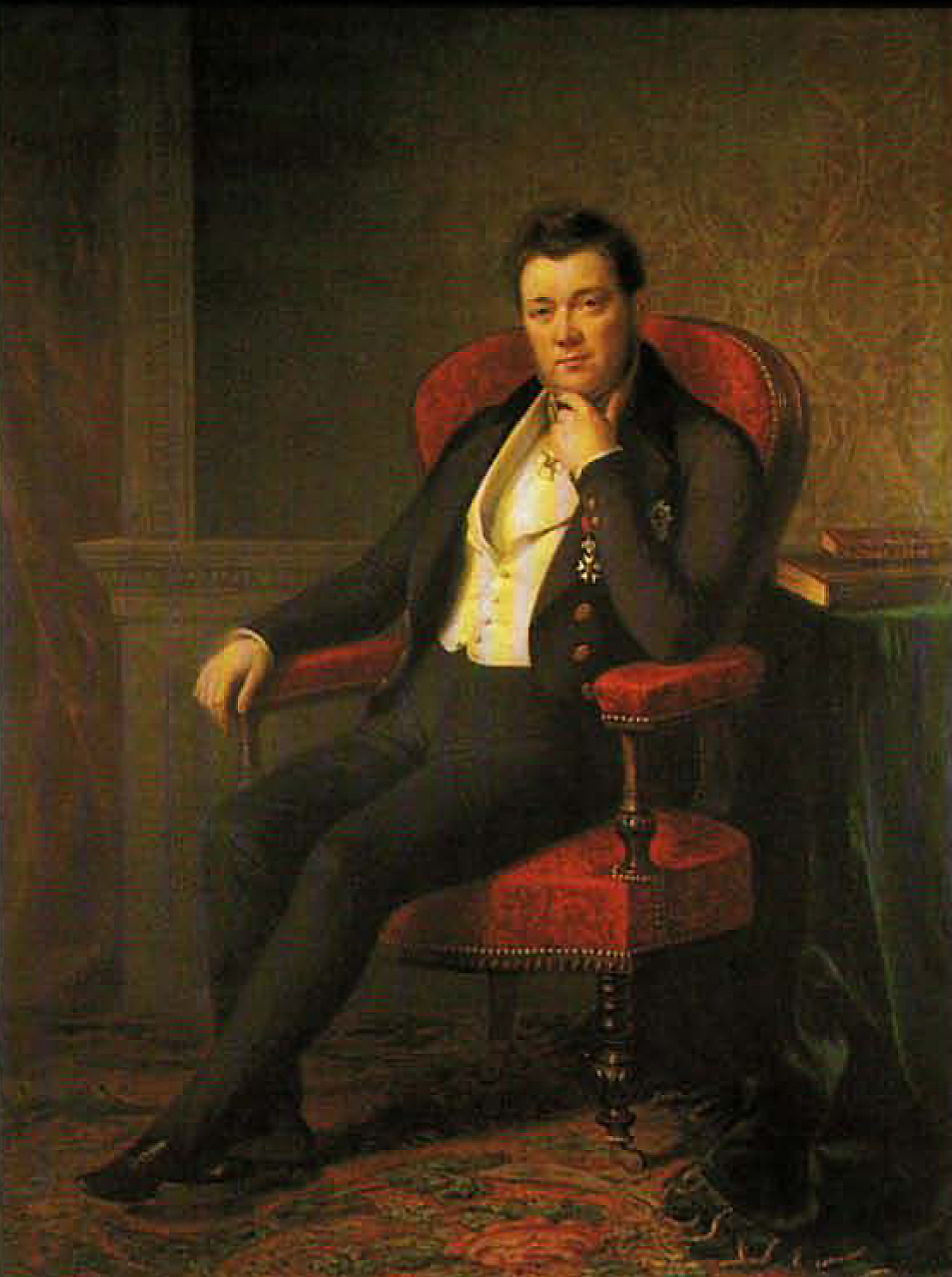
Jean-Pierre Pescatore; portrait by Louis-Aimé Grosclaude (c.1852)

Jean-Pierre Pescatore (11 March 1793 – 9 December 1855) was a Luxembourgish-French businessman, banker, art collector, and philanthropist.

== Early life ==
Born in Luxembourg City as the fourth child of Dominique Pescatore, a merchant in the city, and Marie-Madelaine Geschwind, he came from a family of colonial commodity traders, originally from Ticino, who had settled in Luxembourg in 1736. In 1811, at the age of 18, he enlisted in the army of Napoleon. Promoted to Maréchal des logis in 1813, after several campaigns he deserted and returned to Luxembourg in 1814.

He then entered the world of business and took to selling tobacco like his father and grandfather. Together with his brother Antoine, he was the director from 1814 to 1816 and then again from 1822 to 1844 of the tobacco factory in the Fishmarket neighbourhood which had been founded by their grandfather Jules Joseph Antoine Pescatore.

== Marriages ==
In 1816 he married Marguerite Beving, and settled with her in Luxembourg City. She died of illness, and without children, in June 1821.

In 1837 Pescatore met the Swiss Anne-Cathérine Weber, with whom he lived together and whom he married in 1851 in the church (but not civilly), in order to render this relation acceptable to the public. Due to this confusion there were arguments after his death about the inheritance.

== Move to France ==
In 1817 he received long-term permission from the French authorities to import Havana tobacco to France. Pescatore's good relations with the Régie française des tabacs, the Belgian annexation of the French-speaking part of Luxembourg in 1839, and Luxembourg's accession to the Zollverein (the German customs union), exposing Luxembourgish tobacco manufacturing to strong competition from abroad, were damaging to Pescatore's business interests in the Grand-Duchy. He therefore established himself in Paris, in order to concentrate solely on the French markets, and would become a naturalised French citizen on 3 September 1846. In addition to trading in tobacco, he also dabbled in finance, founding the bank "J.P. Pescatore et Cie" on 27 December 1844 with the Austrian Frédéric Adolphe Grieninger.

== Property and hobbies ==
On 11 August 1844 he bought the Château de la Celle from the Viscount de Morel-Vindé's heirs. In 1849 he also bought a vineyard at Médoc, near Giscours. In 1852 he became mayor of La Celle-Saint-Cloud, which he remained until his death.

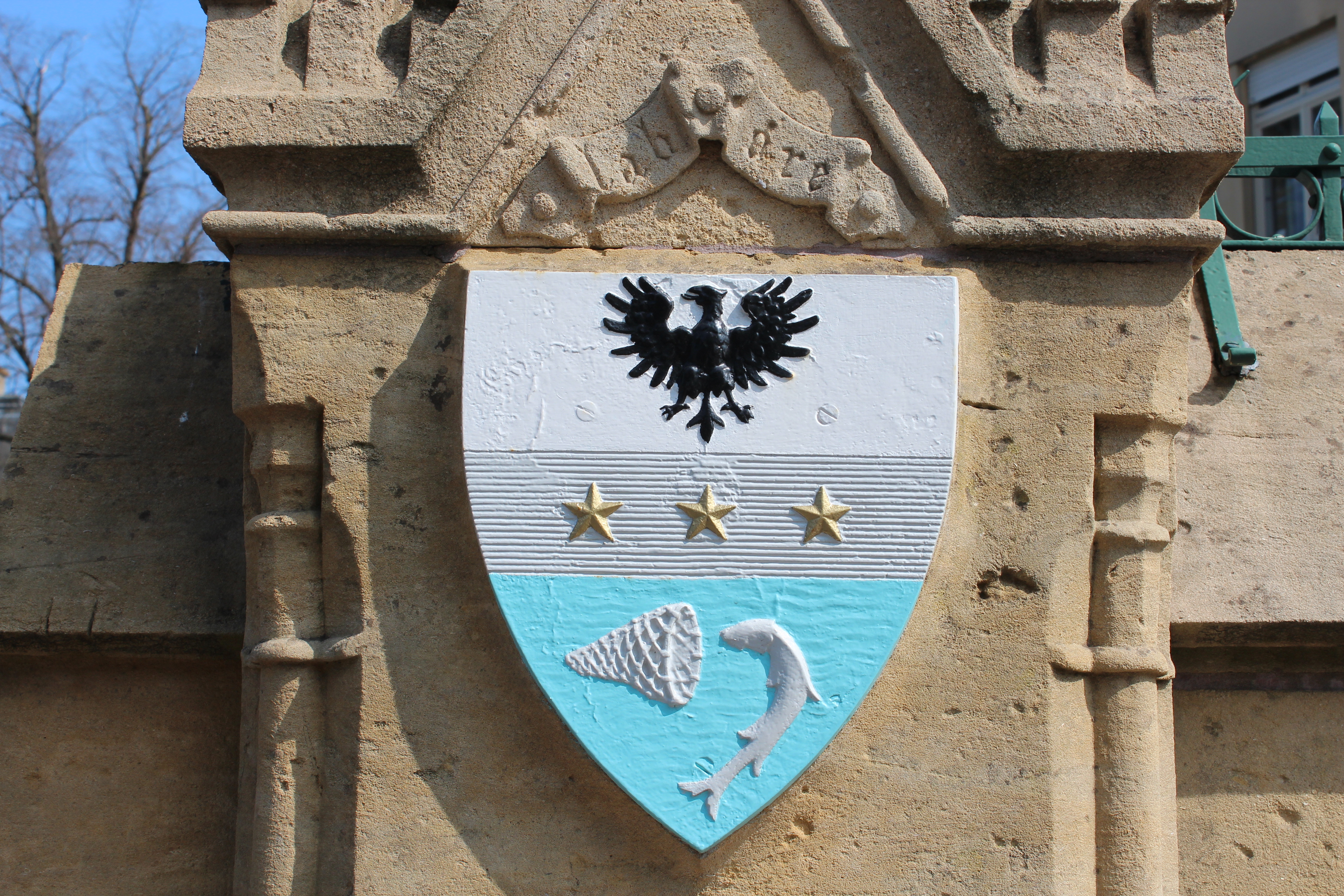
Pescatore coat of arms, on the walls of the Fondation Pescatore

Jean-Pierre Pescatore had various hobbies, including collecting works of art, rare plant specimens and breeding horses. He acquired paintings and drawings from prestigious backgrounds, such as the galleries of the King of the Netherlands and of Louis Philippe I. He amassed more than 800 plant specimens, including a collection of the first orchids in France, with the help of Jean Linden. The latter named a publication with orchids from his collection, Pescatorea. Empress Eugénie, and her husband Napoleon III, came to see the collection twice. Pescatore renovated his château to house his fragile plants, constructing an orangery and three greenhouses. He became president of the horticultural society of Seine-et-Oise and of the floral society of Versailles. A recipient of the Légion d'honneur, in 1852 he was also appointed Consul-General of the Netherlands. He died on 9 December 1855 at his Paris house, and was buried in La Celle-Saint-Cloud. He left the considerable sum of 10 million francs; without a direct heir, his inheritance was the subject of a dispute between his partner, Anne Catherine Weber, and his other heirs.

Finally, the Château de La Celle was awarded to his niece, Elisabeth (Lily) Dutreux-Pescatore, with usufruct for life to Anne Catherine Weber. The heirs of Pescatore-Dutreux owned the château until 1951.

In 1940, Grand Duchess Charlotte of Luxembourg stopped at the Château de la Celle for a few days, while fleeing the German invasion of Luxembourg. The Germans then occupied the castle until August 1944. After the liberation of France, Auguste Dutreux regained his property. He donated the castle and its gardens, to the French Foreign Ministry on 7 February 1951, which still owns it today.

== Legacy ==
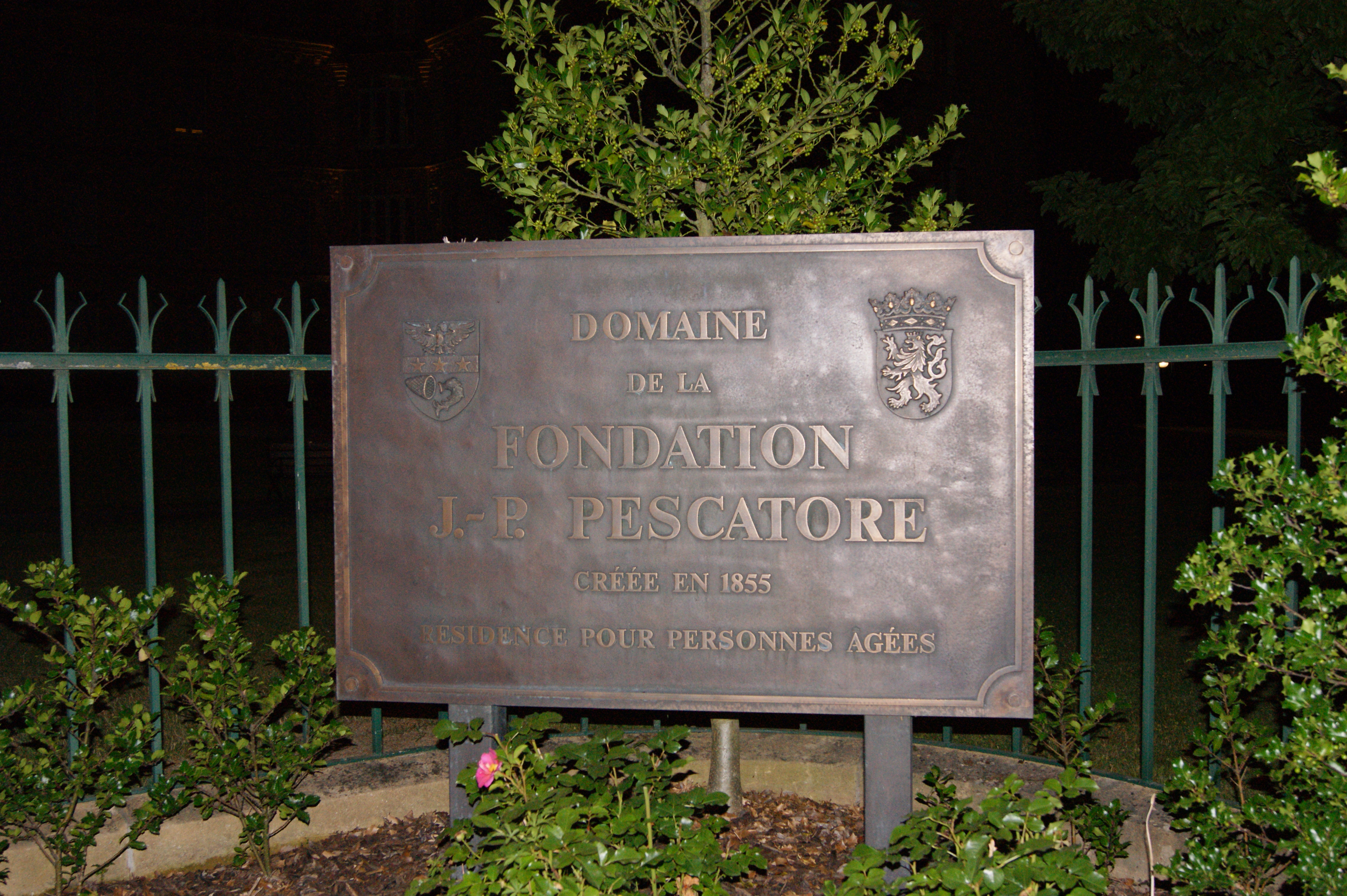
The Fondation Pescatore old people's home

In 1853, Pescatore donated half a million francs to the city of Luxembourg, in order to build an old people's home, the later Fondation Pescatore, opened in 1892. The city also received his art collection, housed in the Musée Jean-Pierre Pescatore, on the first floor of the town hall. In 1953 it was moved to the Villa Vauban.

In 2005 the Luxembourgish postal service put out a stamp commemorating his philanthropy in the Grand Duchy. Two streets are also named after him, one in La Celle Saint-Cloud and one in Luxembourg.
