= Architecture of Luxembourg =

Modern buildings on the Kirchberg Plateau

The architecture of Luxembourg probably extends back to the Treveri, a Celtic tribe who prospered in the 1st century BC. A few ruins remain from the Roman occupation but the most significant contributions over the centuries have been the country's castles and churches. Today there is a veritable architectural boom as Luxembourg's economic prosperity provides a basis for developments in the financial, EU and cultural sectors with a number of world-class buildings.

== History ==
The architecture of Luxembourg appears to have its origins in the 1st or 2nd century BC when the Treveri, a prosperous Celtic tribe, developed an oppidum on Titelberg in the south-western corner of the country. The Romans, who occupied the area from 53 BC until the middle of the 5th century, are responsible for the remains of a number of villas across the country, especially in Echternach, Mamer and Goeblange. The Echternach site covers a huge area (118 by 62 metres), where there was a luxurious mansion from about 70 AD with 40 (later 60) rooms. It had balneae, a water heating system as well as additional buildings serving the surrounding farming community.

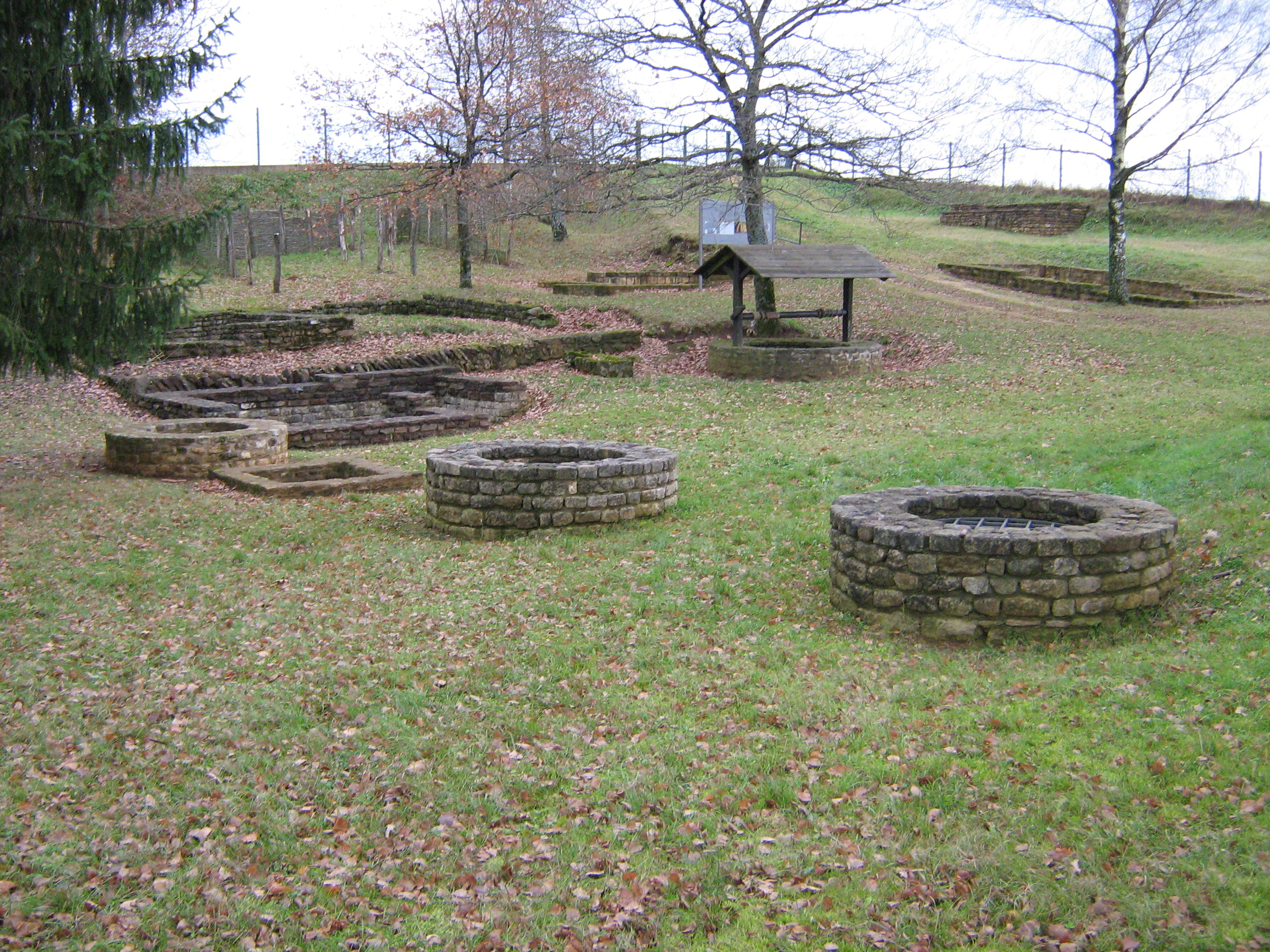
The Celtic settlement at Titelberg

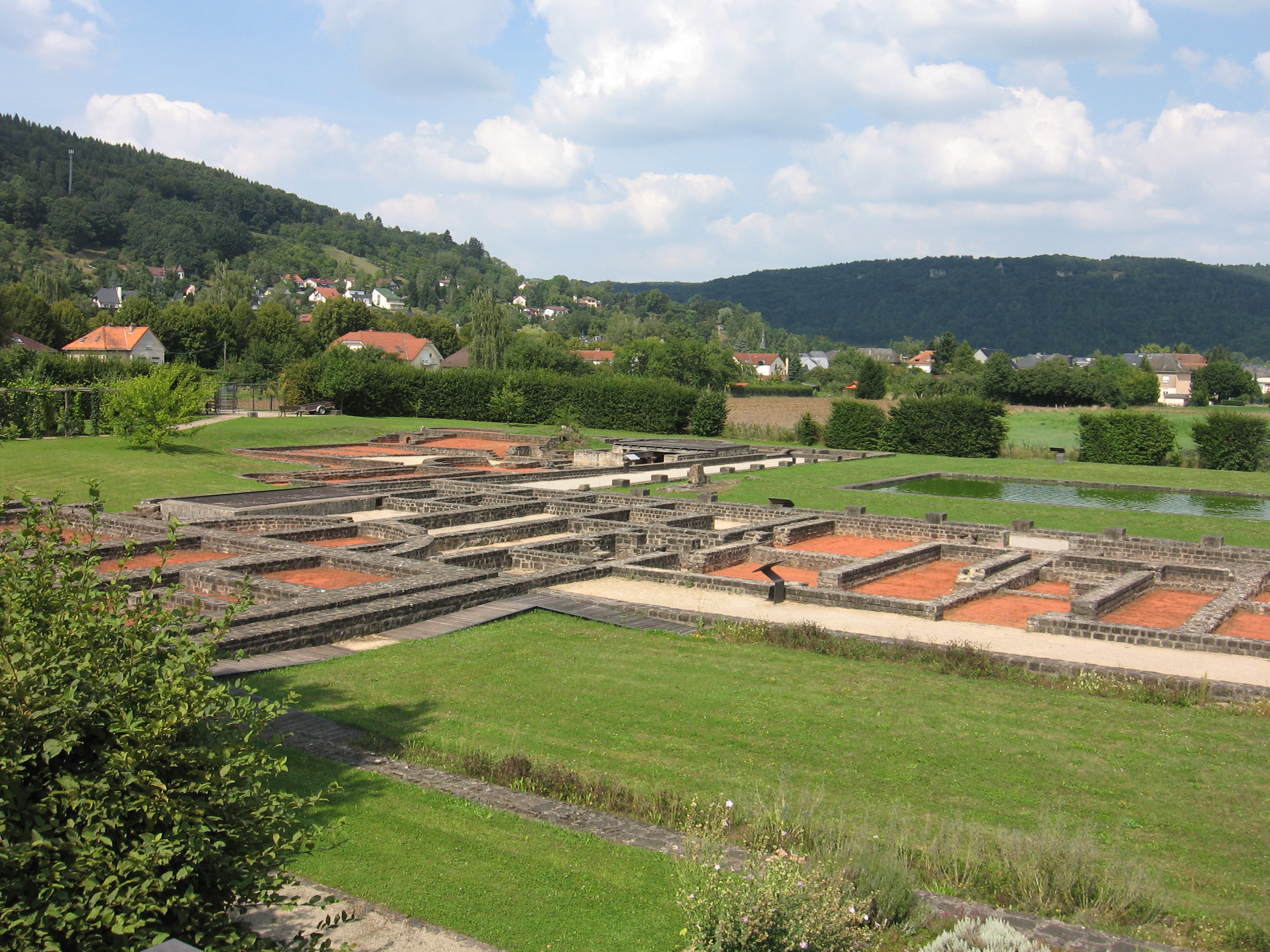
Roman ruins at Echternach

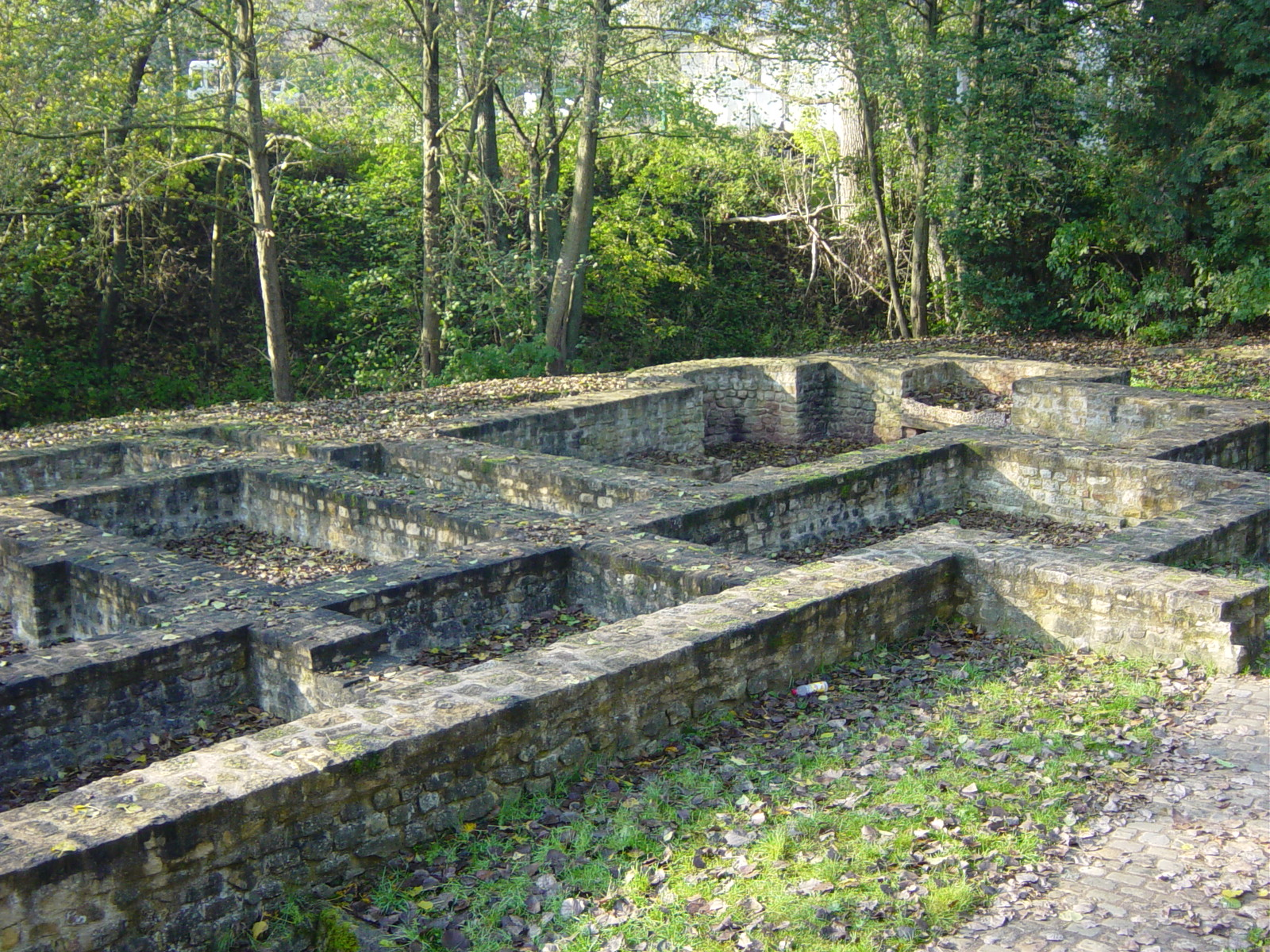
Roman baths at Mamer

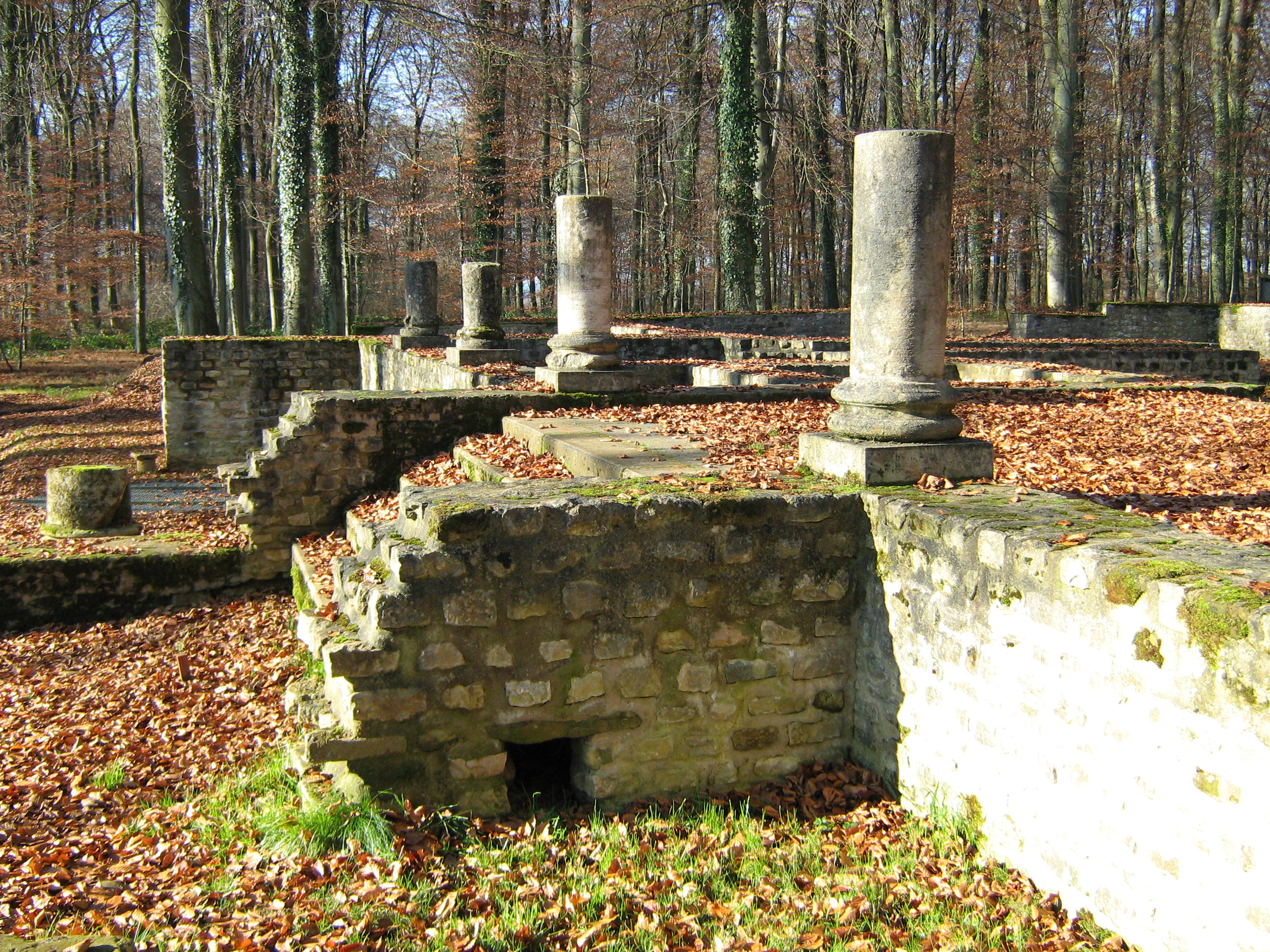
Roman villa in Goeblange

== Castles and churches ==
=== Castles ===
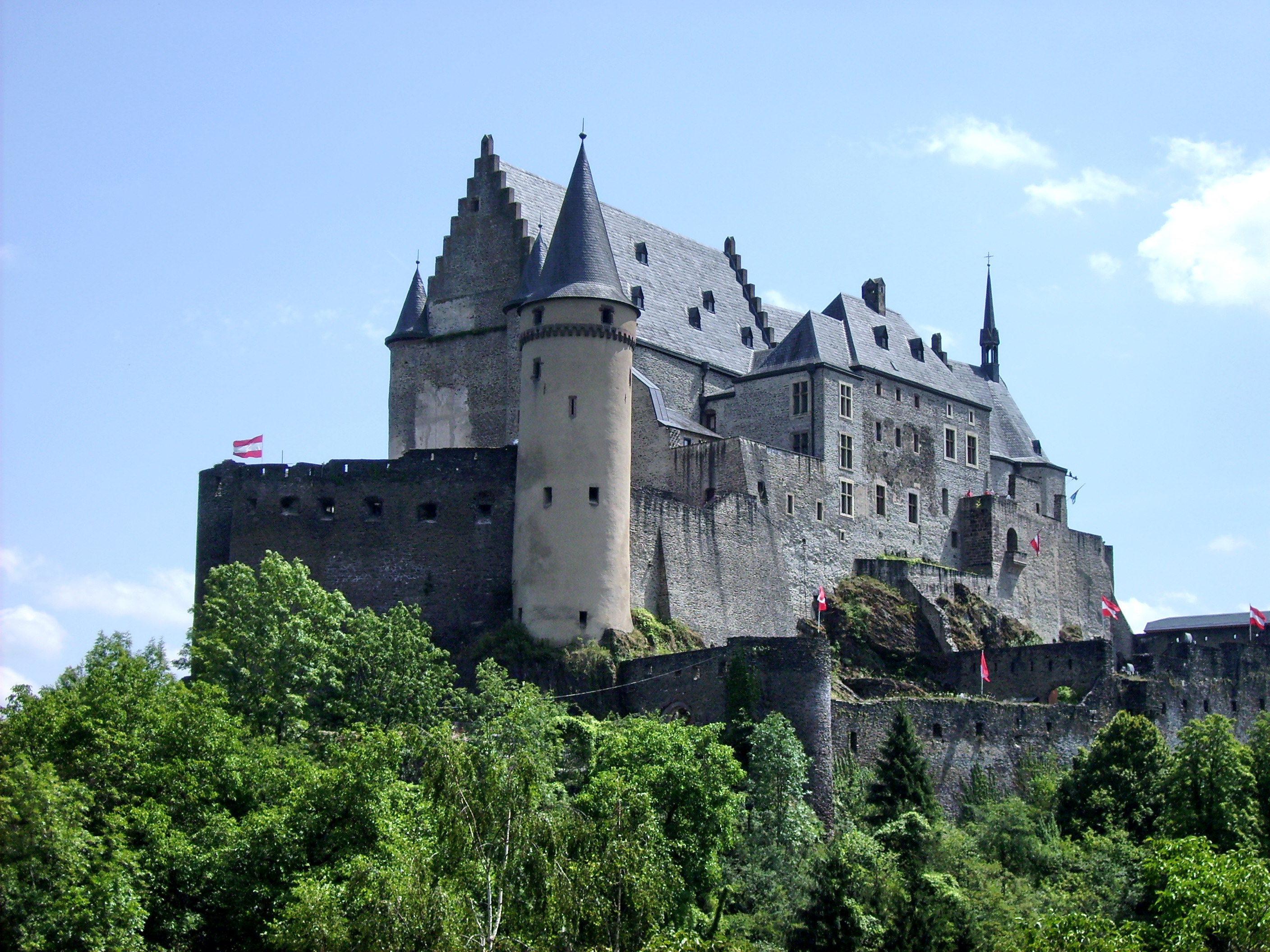
Vianden Castle

One of the country's most famous monuments, the imposing Castle of Vianden, was built between the 11th and 13th centuries on the site of a Gallo-Roman castellum. Initially designed as a fort, a square tower, a kitchen, a chapel and living rooms were added around 1100. During the 12th century, a new tower containing living quarters was built together with a prestigious new decagonal chapel. So as to impress the House of Luxembourg, the counts of Vianden constructed a new two-storey palace measuring 10 by 13 metres at the beginning of the 13th century, attaching it to the chapel by means of a magnificent gallery. The final alterations took place in the middle of the 13th century when the Gothic style was introduced throughout the building.

Luxembourg has many other medieval castles, most of them now in ruins. Some of the more interesting ones are listed below:

- Bourscheid Castle has its origins in the 11th century, when it consisted of a tower building linked to a chapel. The long surrounding wall with its watchtowers was completed in 1384 together with the Stolzembourg House, a separate residential building designed for the masters of Bourscheid. The body of the castle was also raised to a height of 10 metres, housing four storeys complete with a large fireplace and chimney.
- Beaufort Castle, Luxembourg, in the east of Luxembourg not far from Echternach, can be traced back to the 12th century. A number of additions were made over the centuries. In the 17th century, when the site came under new ownership, a second castle was built in the Renaissance style with the result that the older castle slowly fell into ruin.
- Clervaux Castle also has its origins in the 12th century but was substantially extended by the Counts of Clervaux in the 15th and 16th centuries. Today, the interior has been completely refitted for the needs of the municipal administration.
- Hollenfels Castle, first mentioned in 1129, acquired its massive keep in the 14th century. The mansion to the north-east was constructed in 1729.
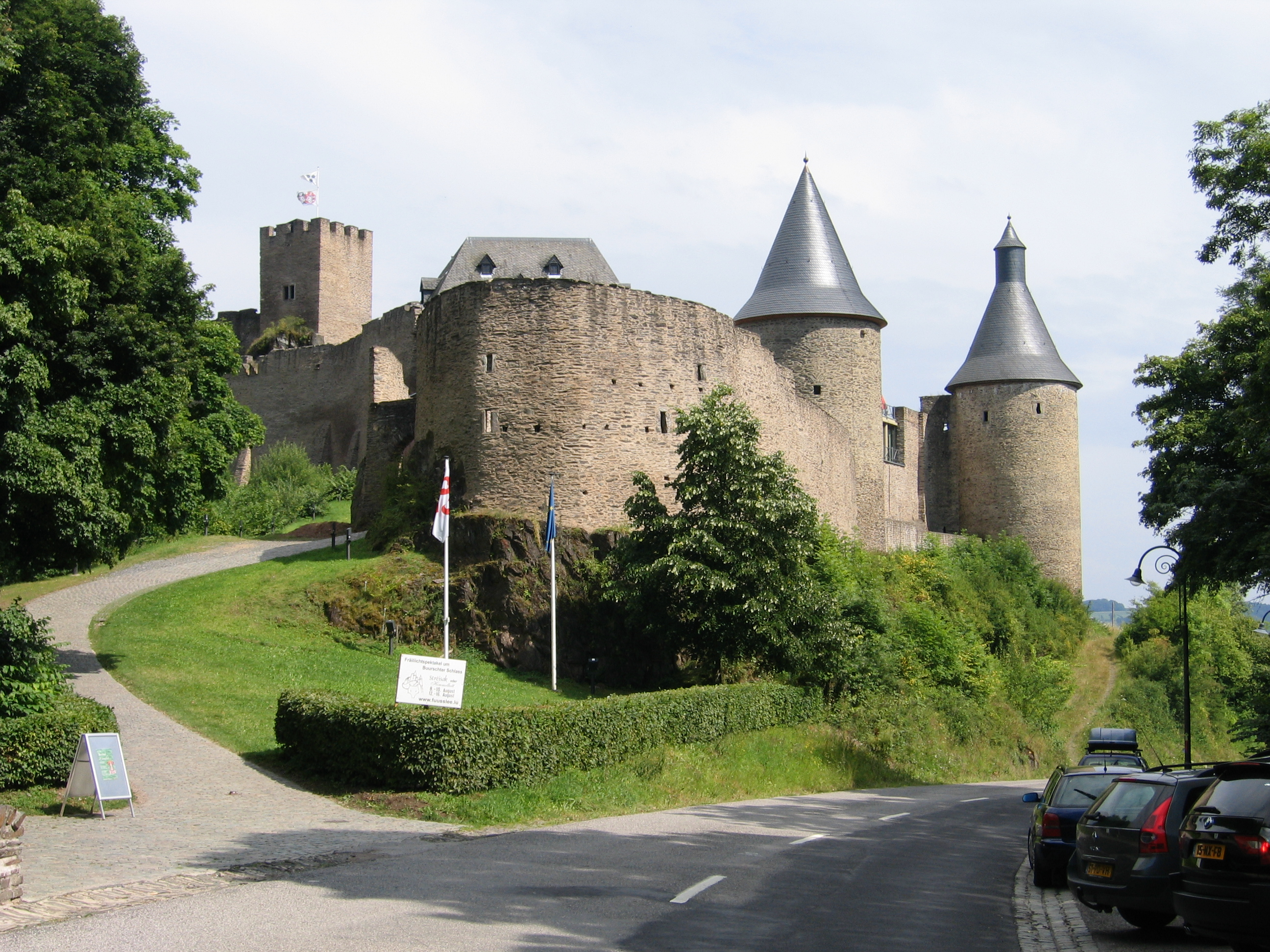
Bourscheid Castle

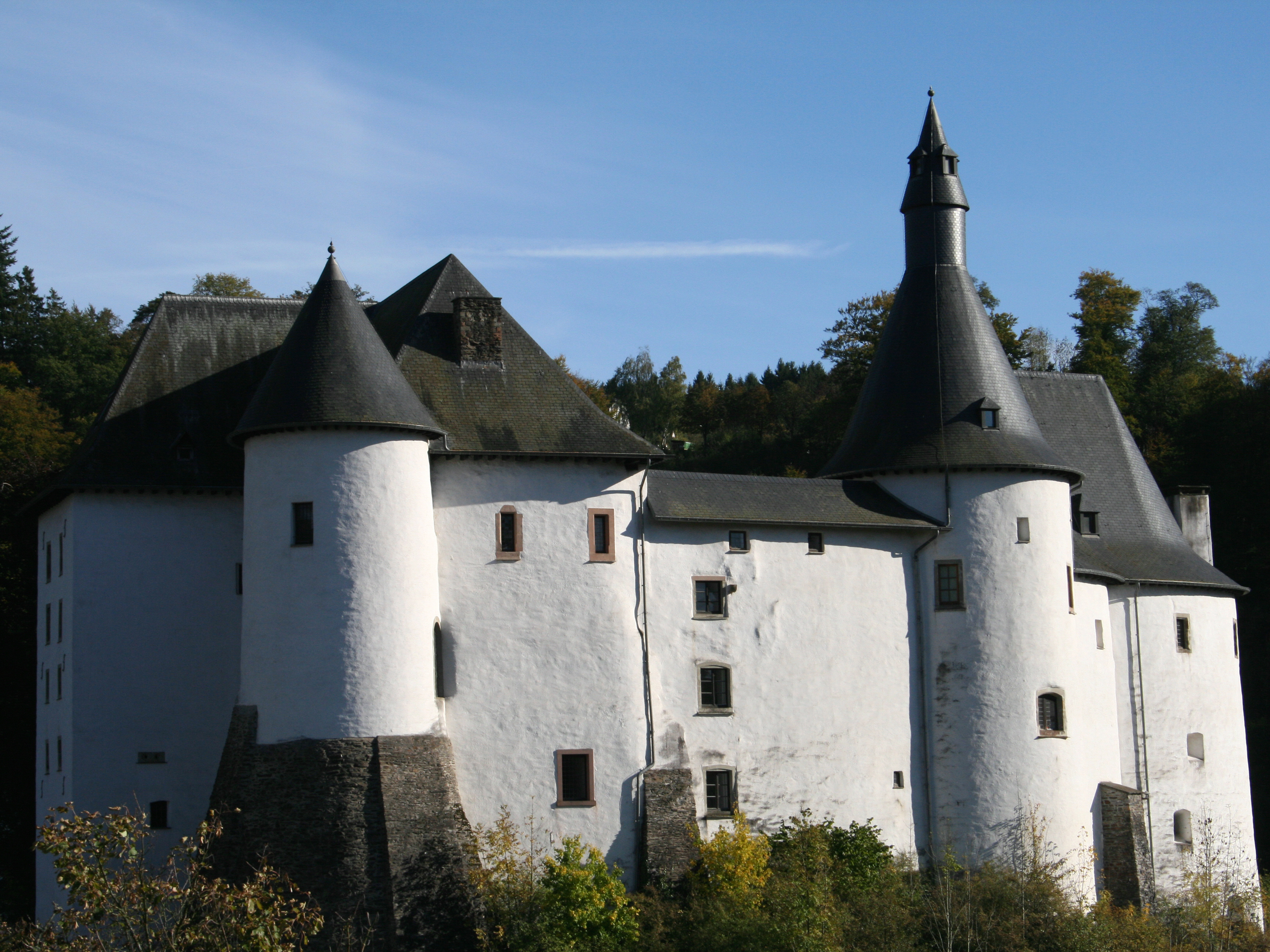
Clervaux Castle

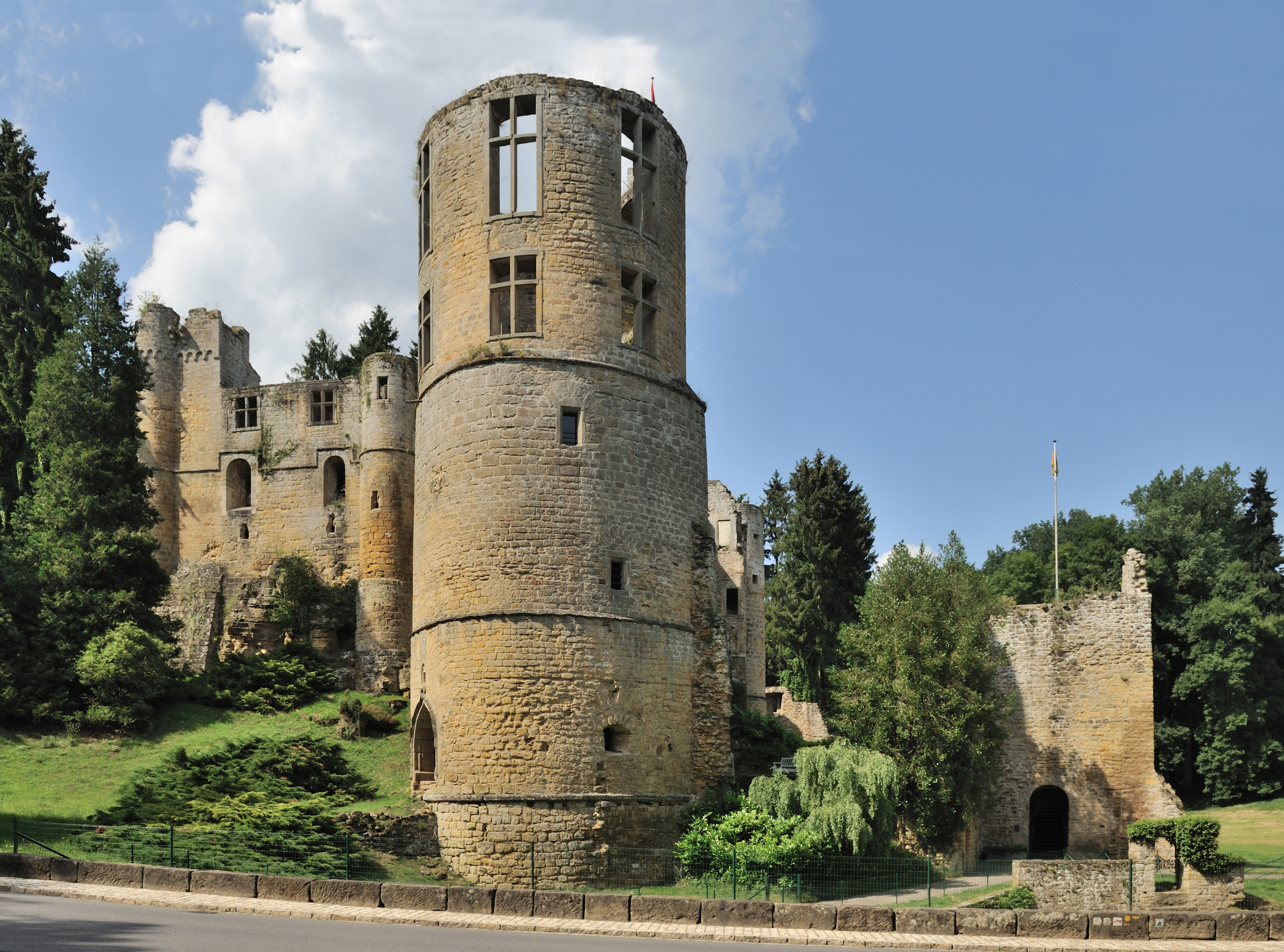
Beaufort Castle

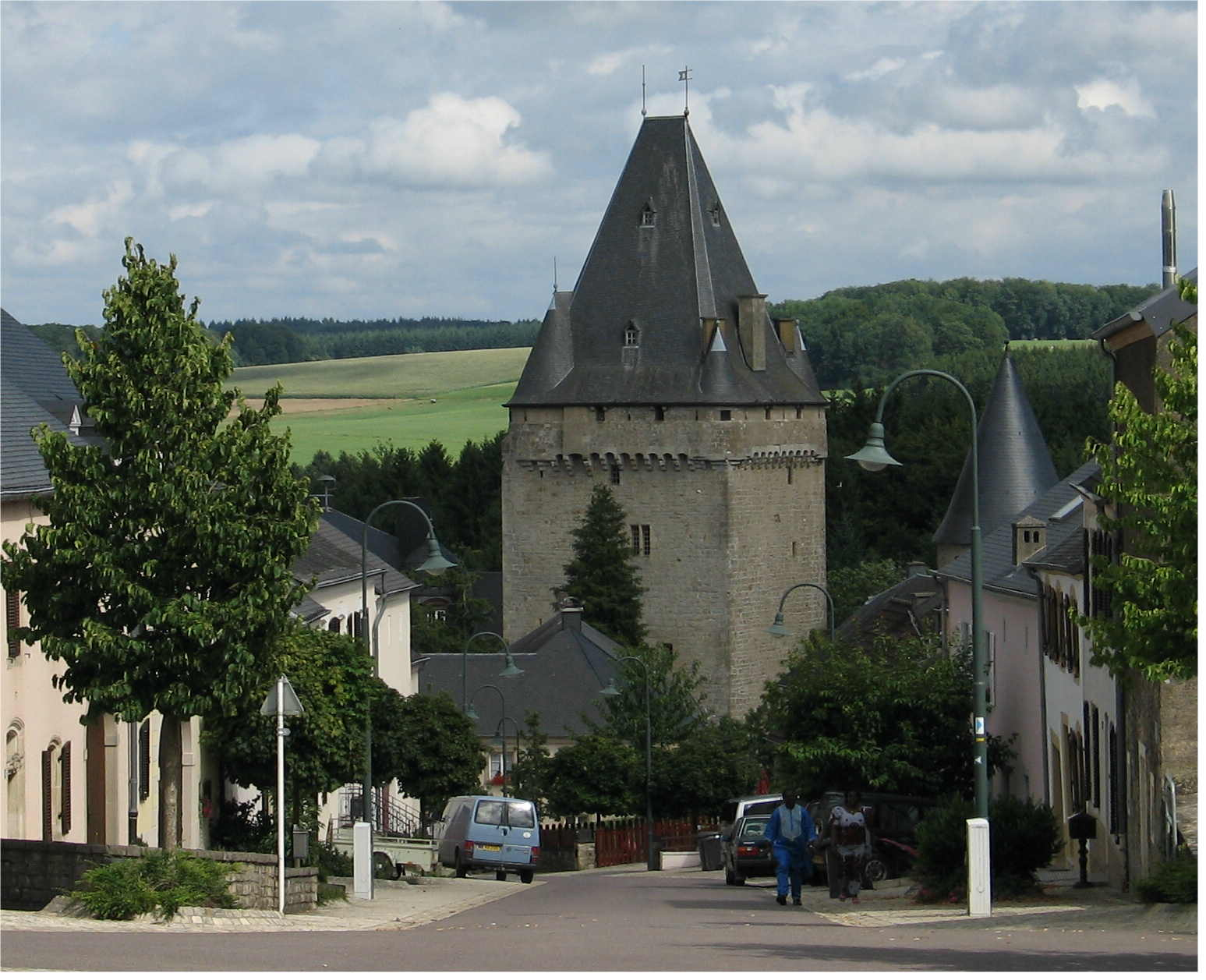
Hollenfels Castle

=== Churches ===
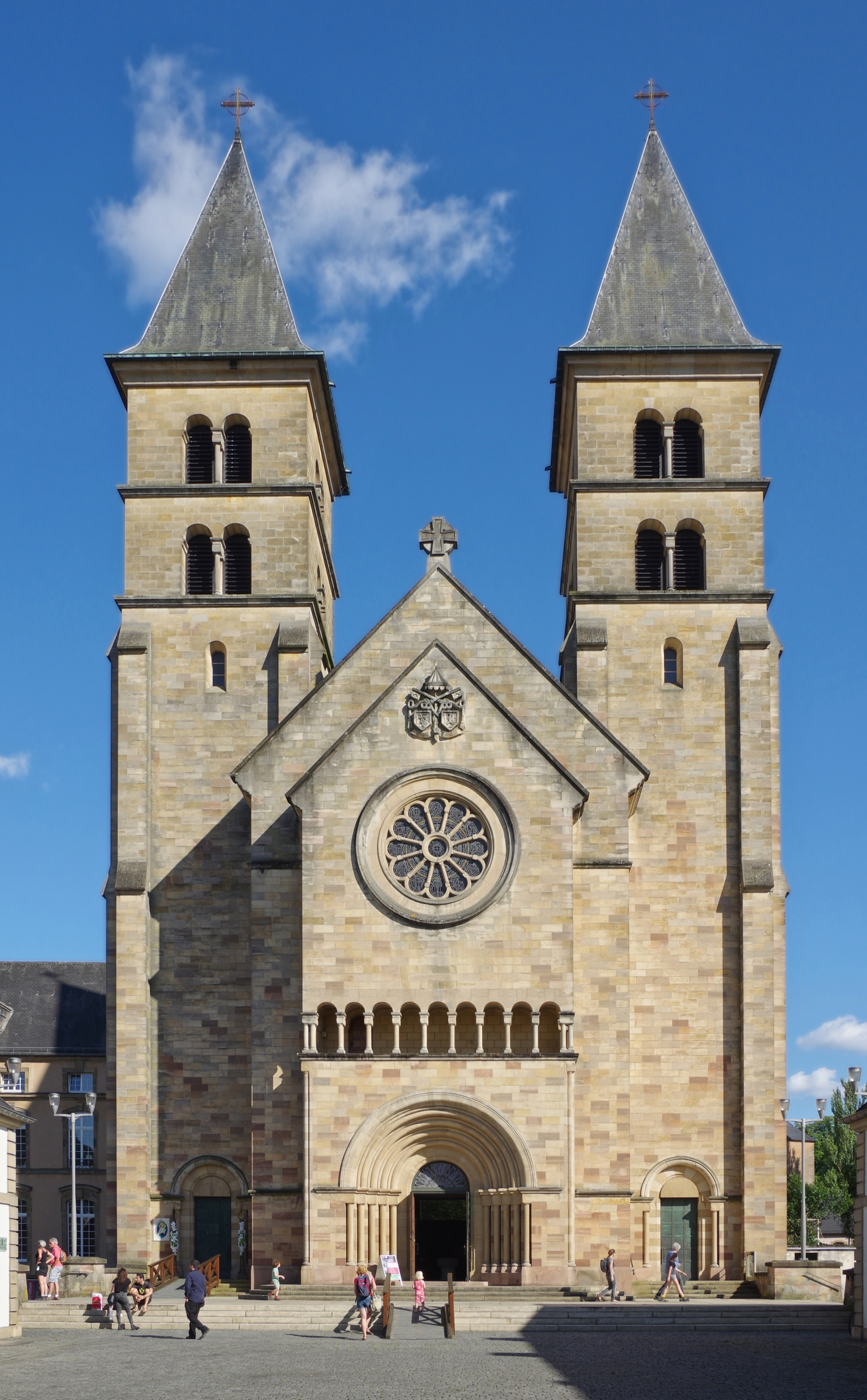
Echternach Basilica

Luxembourg also has a number of architecturally interesting churches. The Abbey of Echternach (700) is the oldest Anglo-Saxon monastery in continental Europe. After the original buildings had burnt down in 1017, a new abbey was built. The church was originally Romanesque in style, but there were Gothic additions in the 14th and 16th centuries.

- One of the best preserved Romanesque churches in Luxembourg is the chapel in Vianden Castle.
- The origins of St. Lawrence's church in Diekirch can be traced back to the 6th century but the present building consists of a 12th-century Romanesque tower and the Gothic 15th-century church.
- St Michael's Church in the centre of Luxembourg City was rebuilt in 1688 in the Romanesque and Baroque styles.
- The Romano-Gothic church in the village of Holler in the north of Luxembourg dates back to the 12th century. It features high Gothic arches, palm vaulting, and 14th century frescos.
- The Munshausen church tower from 1250 is in the Romanesque style while the nave underwent Gothic additions around 1470.
- The church at Septfontaines in the south-west of Luxembourg has a Romanesque tower which is probably from an older building, most of which was rebuilt in the early 14th century and consecrated in 1317. The remains of wooden beams indicate that there was originally a wooden ceiling over the nave. This was replaced by late Gothic vaulting in 1516.
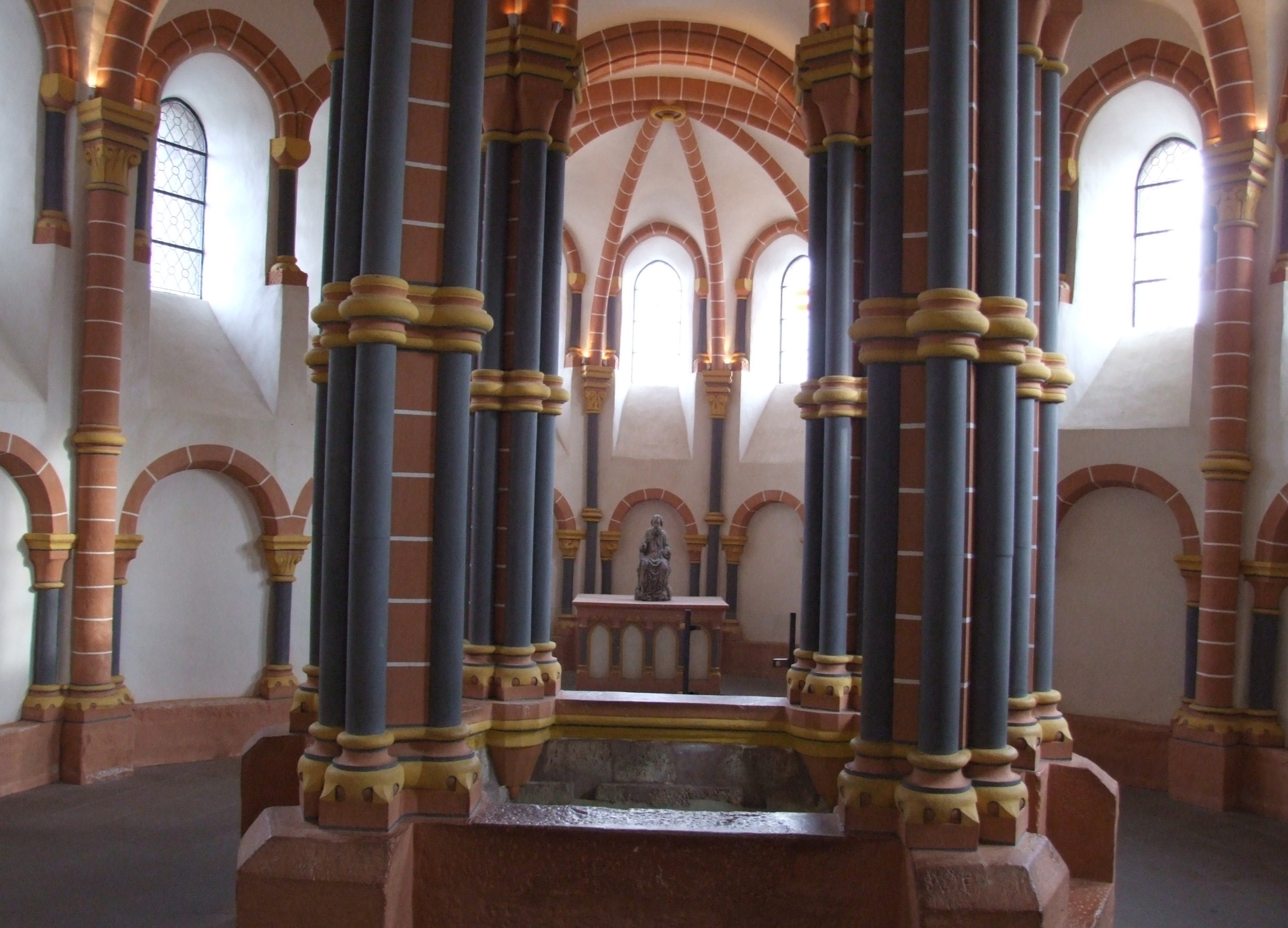
The chapel in Vianden Castle

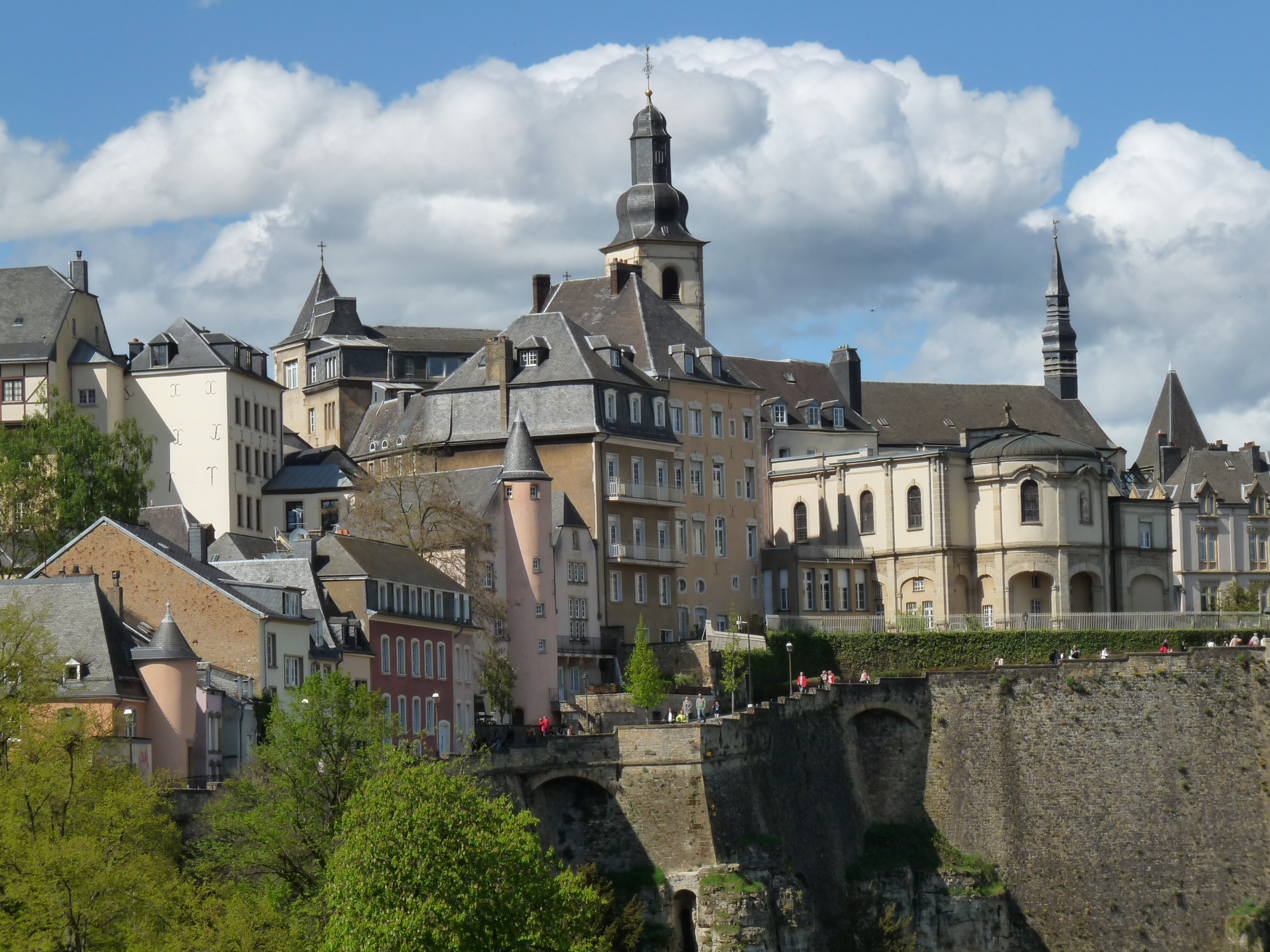
St Michael's Church

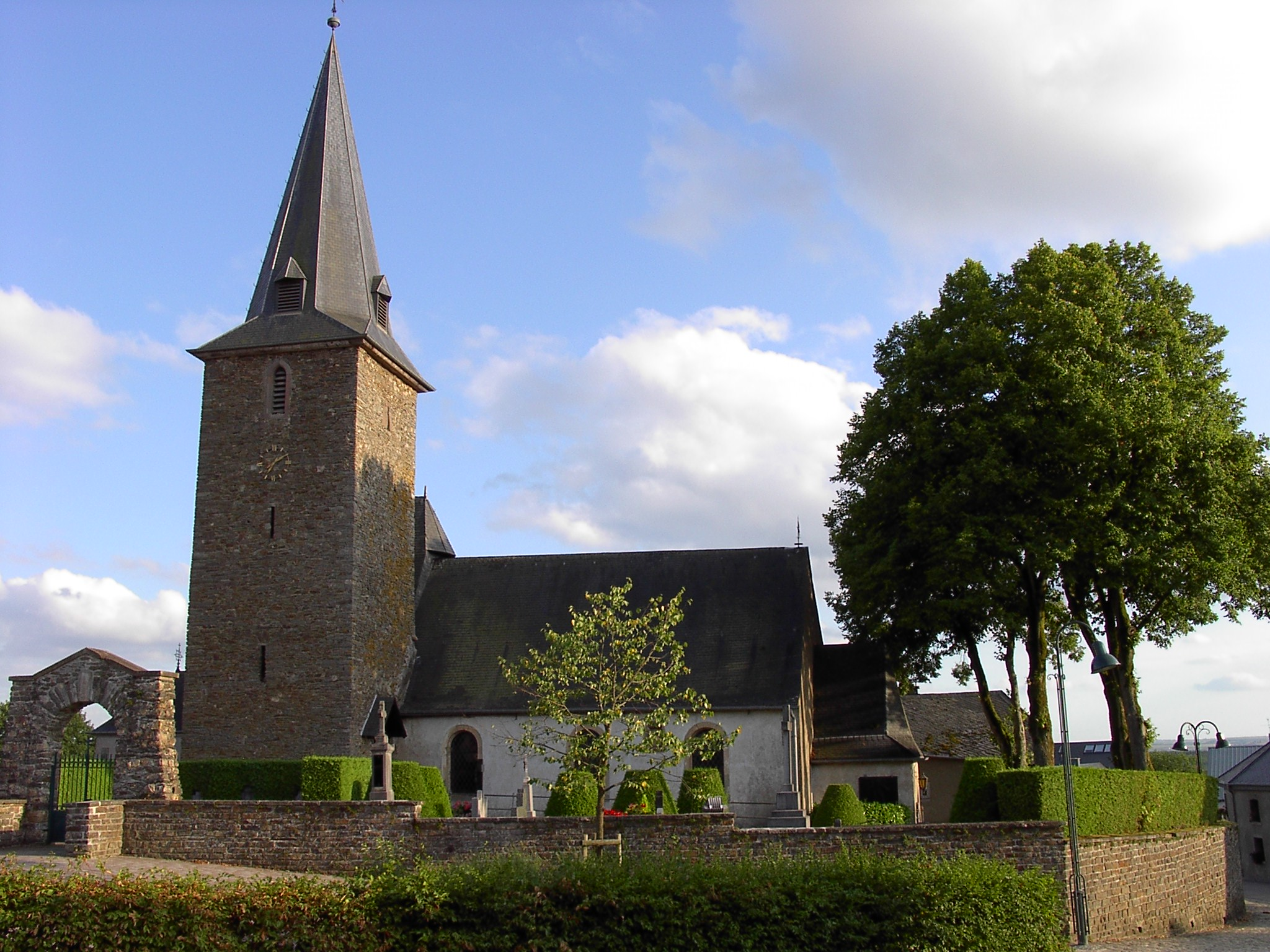
Munshausen Church

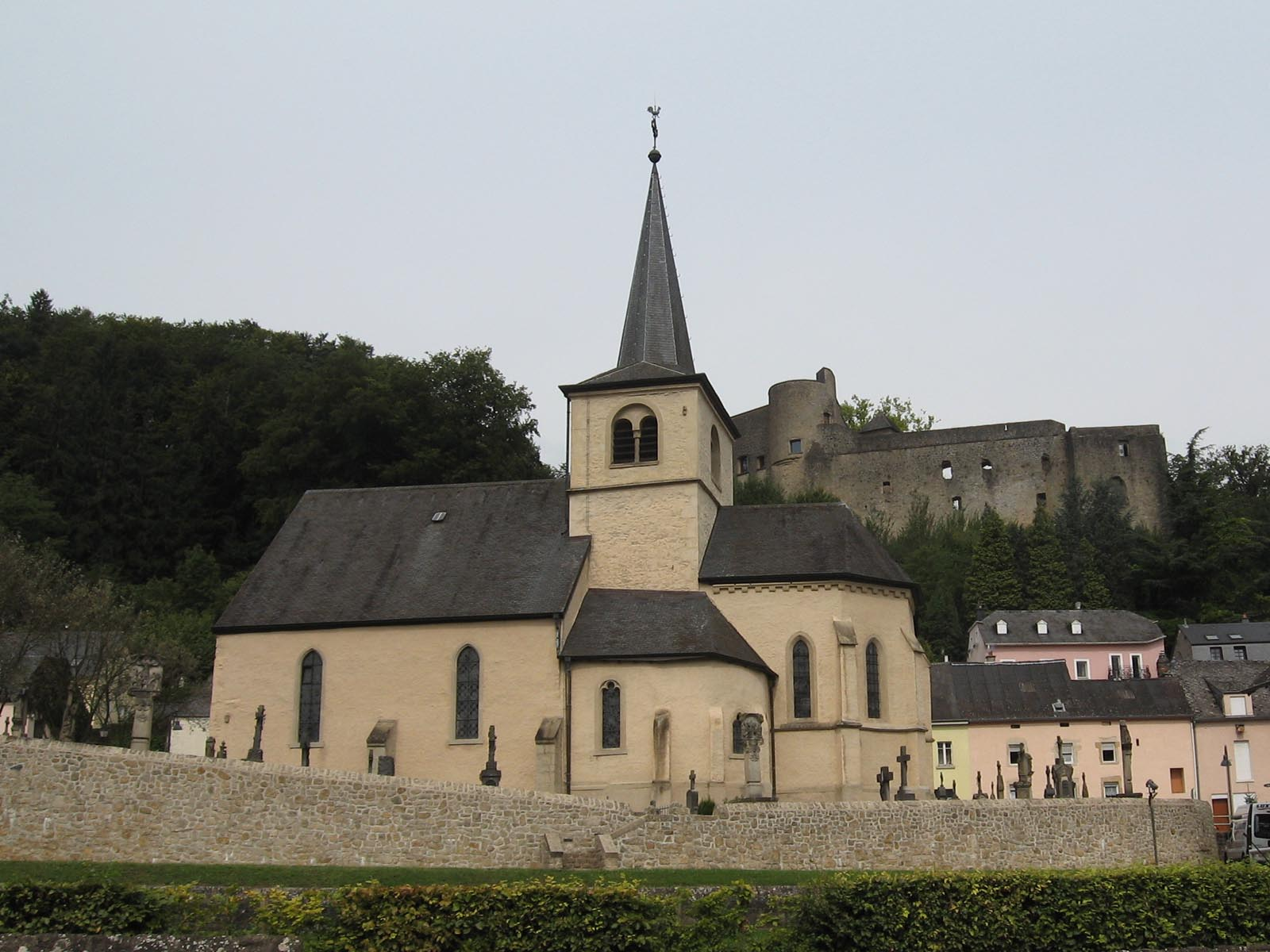
Septfontaines Church

== Bridges ==
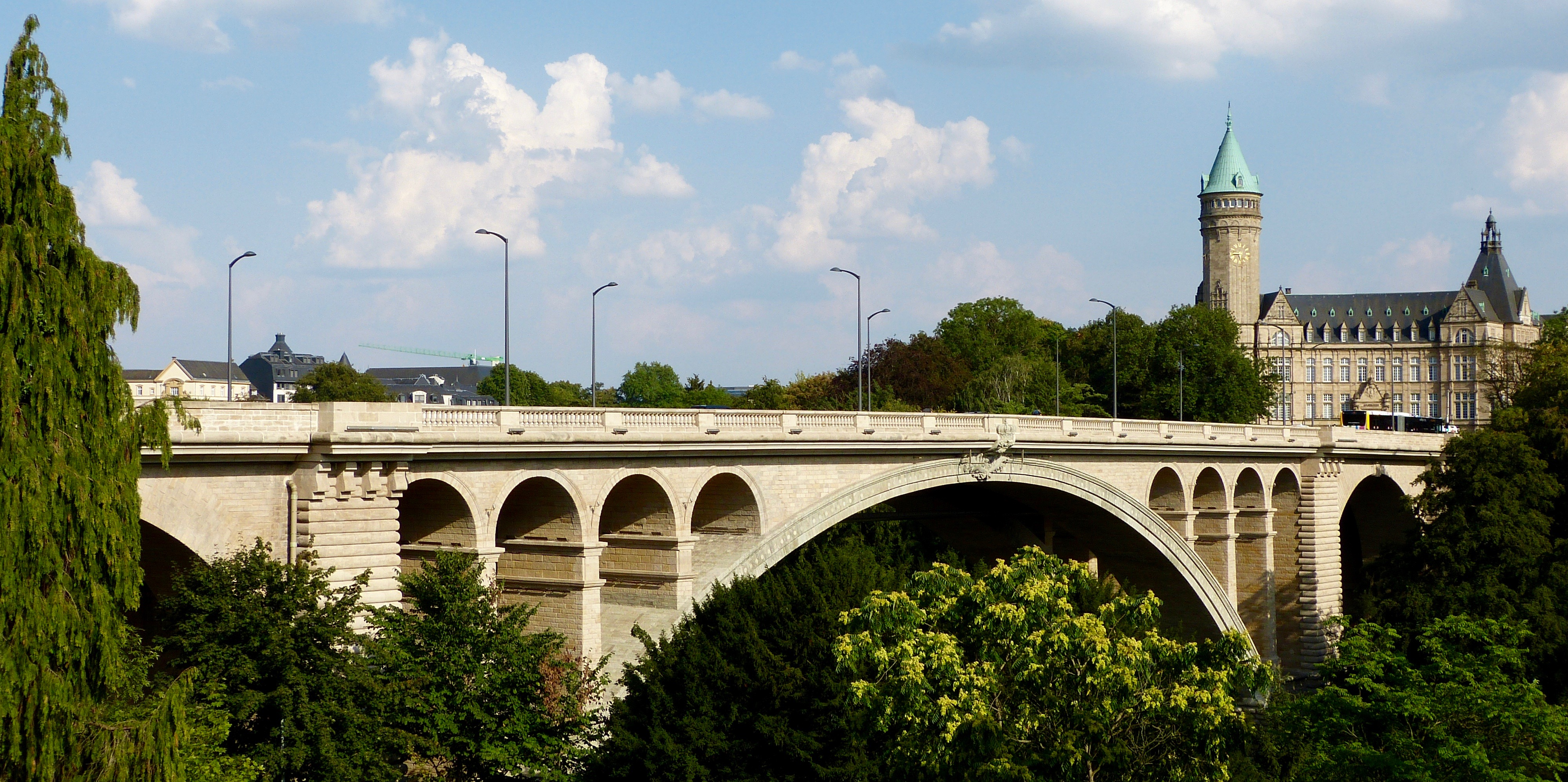
Adolphe Bridge designed by Paul Séjourné (1902)

Luxembourg City has several distinctive bridges. The Adolphe Bridge, connecting the old town centre or Ville Haute to the more recent Gare district to the south, was completed by French engineer Paul Séjourné in 1902. The bridge consists of a large central arch flanked by smaller arches on either side. With a span of 84.65 m (277.72 ft), the central arch was the largest of its day. The bridge is currently being widened to accommodate a new tram line. The design of Walnut Lane Bridge in Philadelphia was copied from the Adolph Bridge.

The Passerelle, designed by Edouard Grenier and Auguste Letellier, was completed in 1861. The bridge is 290 m (951 ft) long, with 24 arches, and rises 45 m (148 ft) above the Pétrusse valley floor. It connects the city center with the railway station to the south.

The Grand Duchess Charlotte Bridge, completed in 1965, was designed by the German architect Egon Jux. Carrying road traffic on three lanes in each direction, it connects the city centre with European Institutions and the financial district on the Kirchberg Plateau. It towers above the little bridge known as de Béinchen (1786) which forms part of Vauban's fortifications.

The two-storey Pont du château (Castle Bridge), built of sandstone by the Austrians in 1735, replaces an old drawbridge between the cliffs of the Bock. It provides access to the eastern end of the old town up the hill from Clausen. In addition to the roadway at the top, it also has three other means of crossing: one across the four upper arches, one through a spiral staircase inside the lower arch and one under Sosthène Weis, the street below, through a passage leading to the casemates.

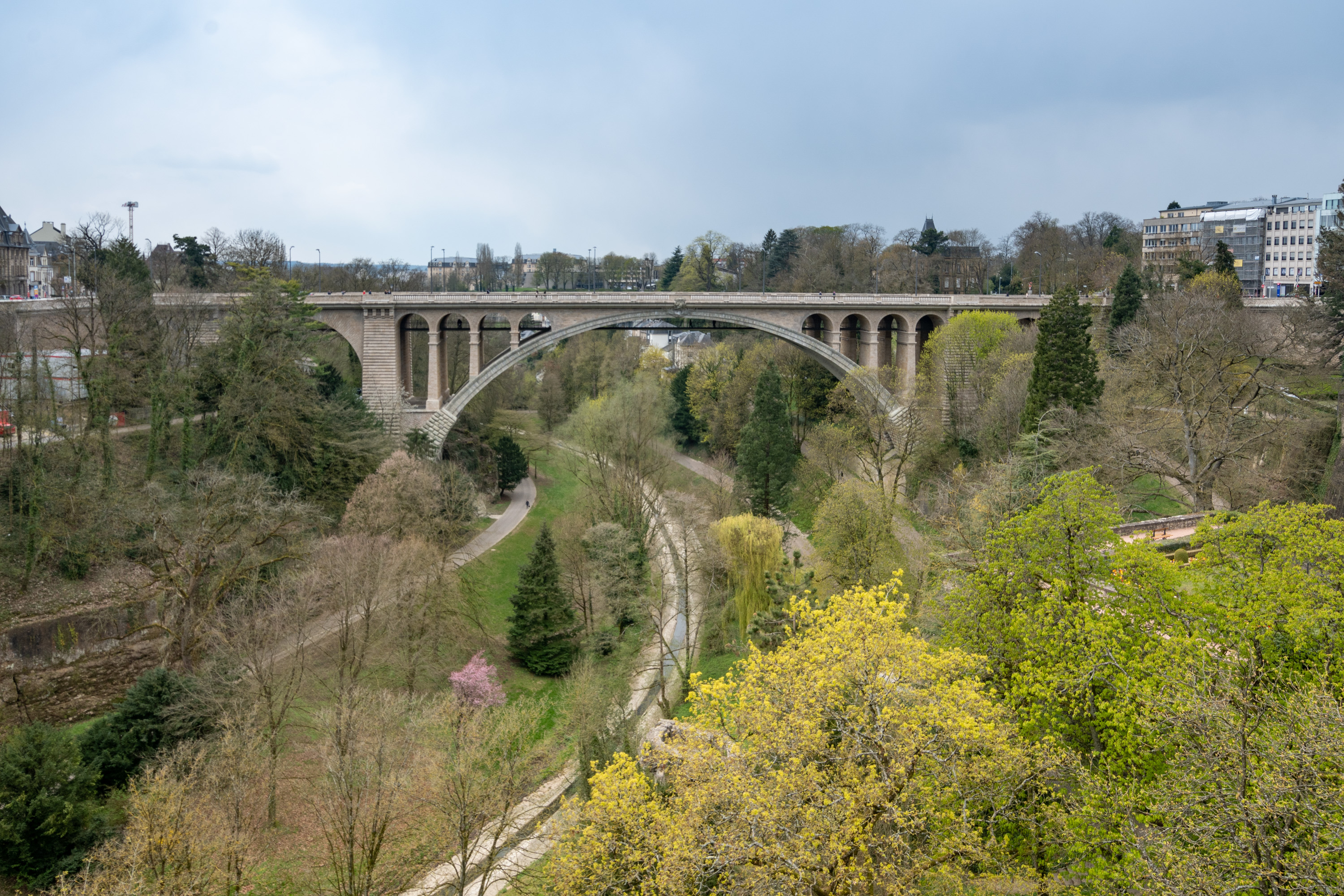
A view of the suspended lower deck of the Adolphe Bridge opened in 2018 as a cycle and pedestrian route.

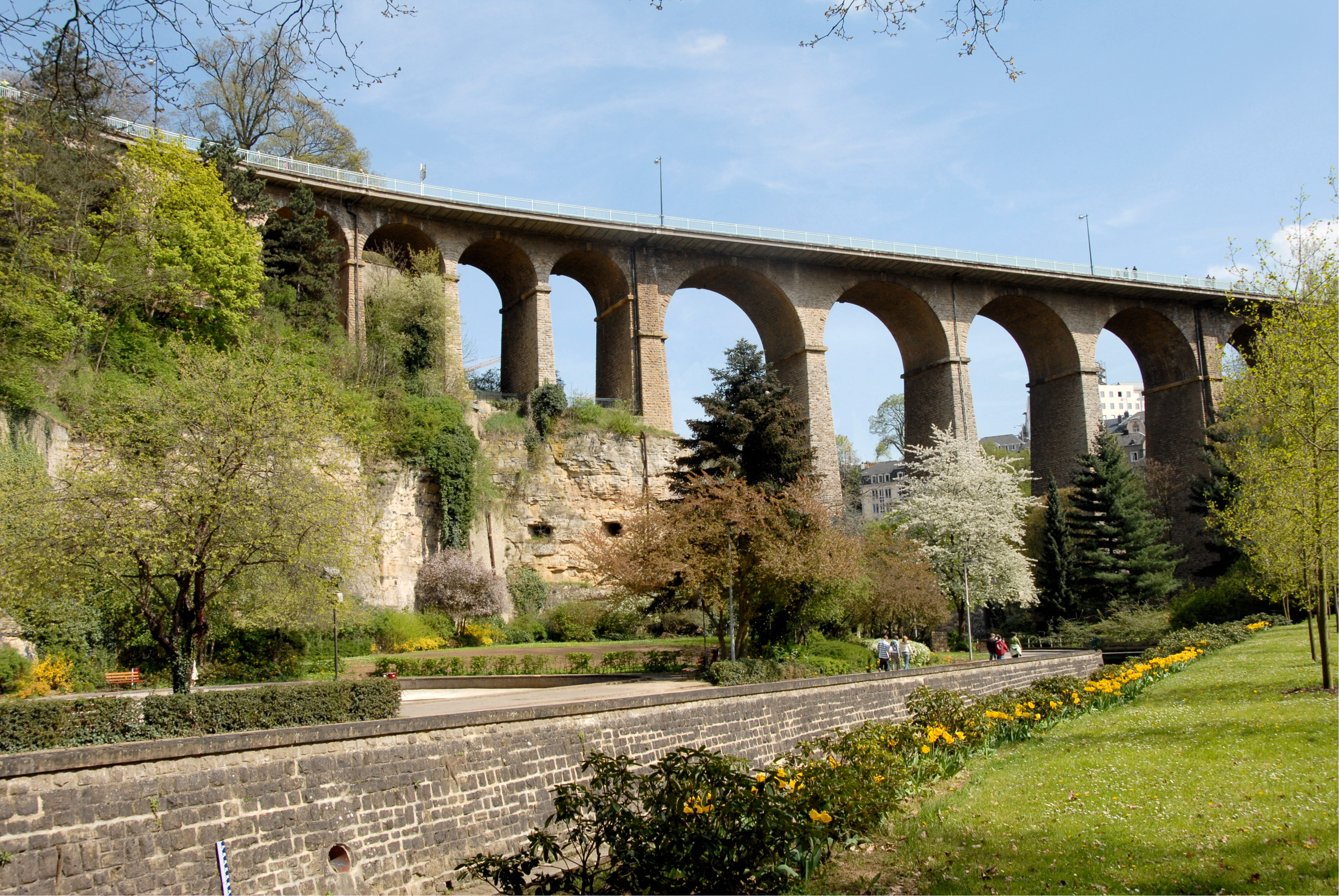
The Passerelle (1861)

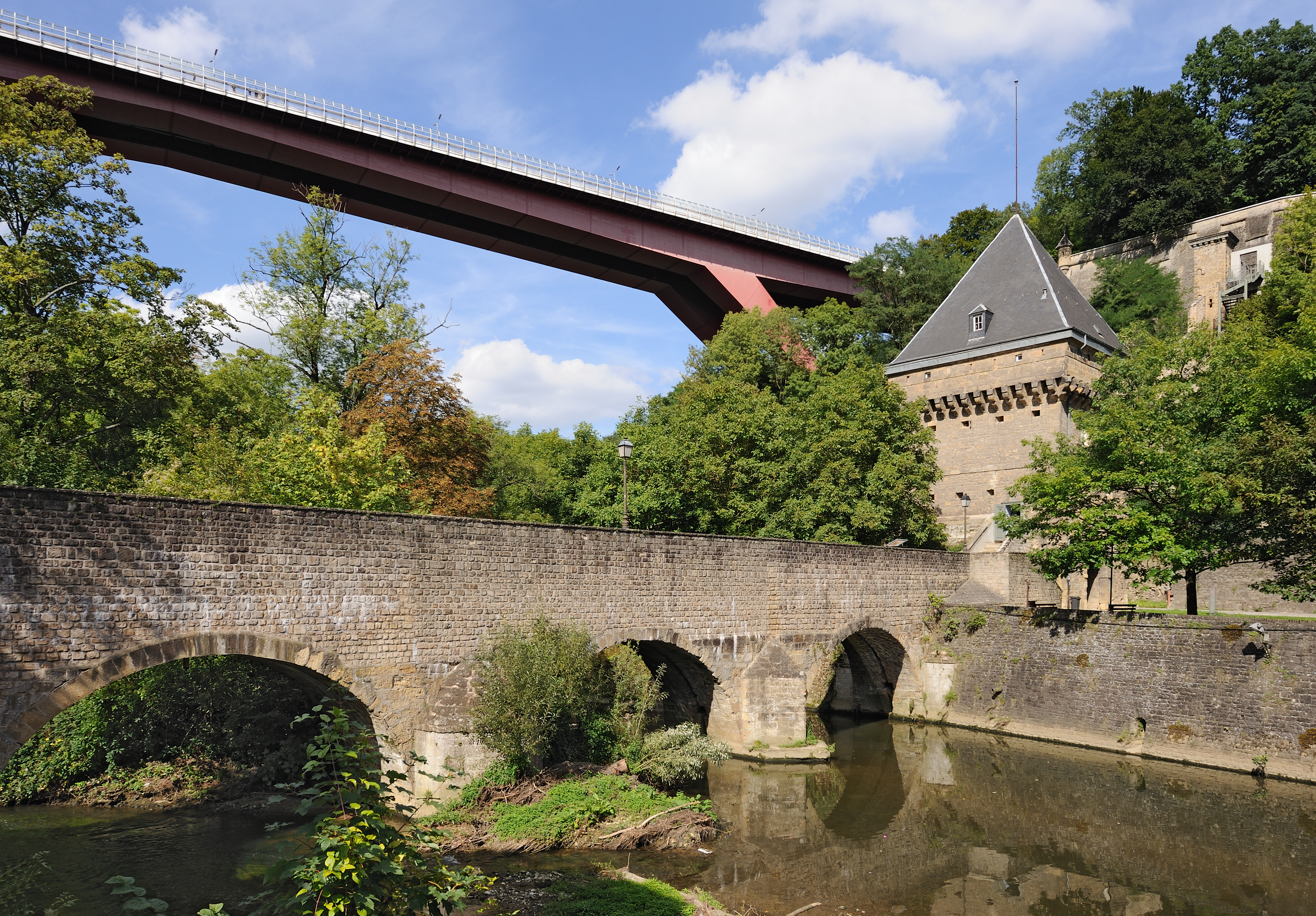
The Grand Duchess Charlotte Bridge above de Béinchen

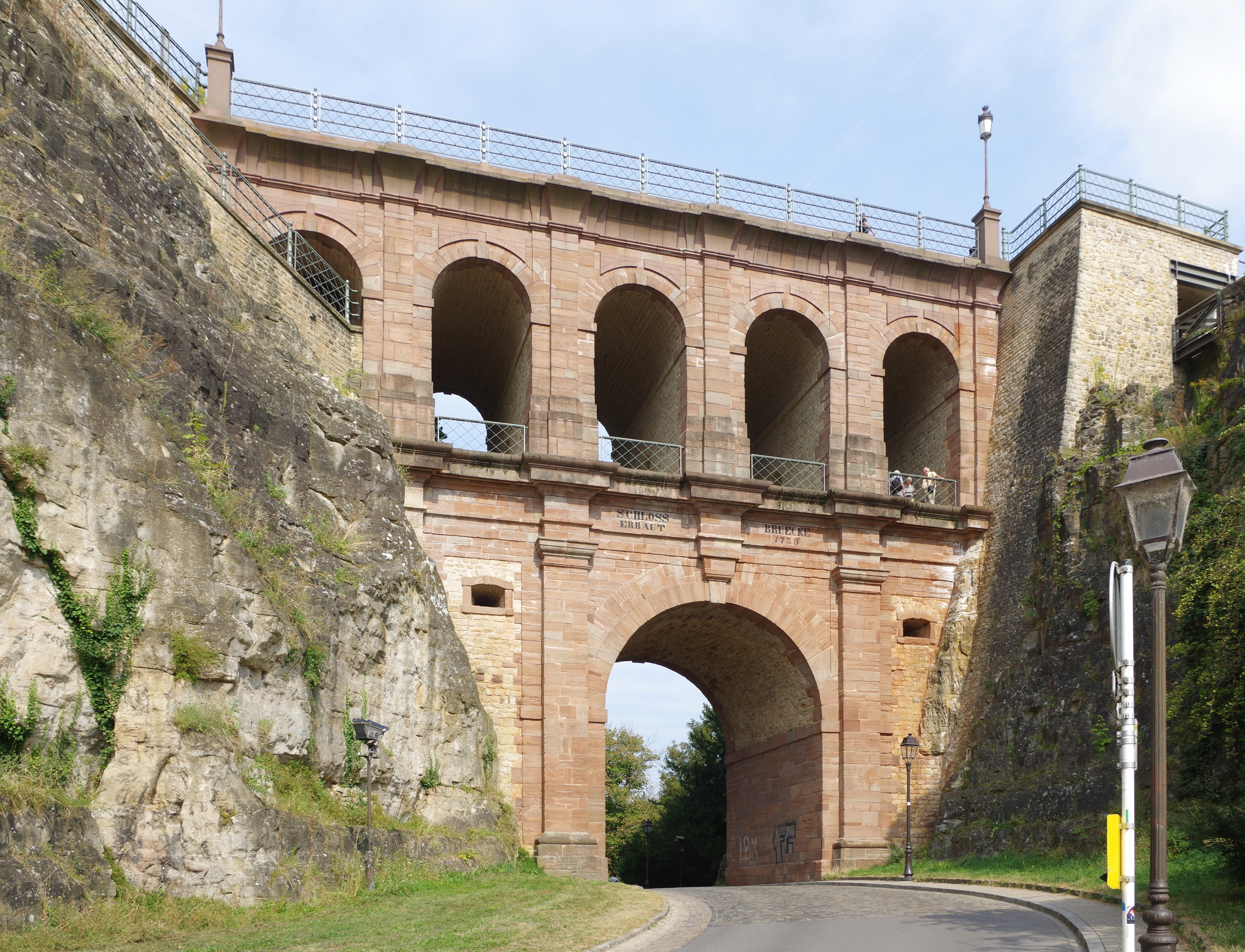
Pont du château (1735)

== Other buildings of note ==
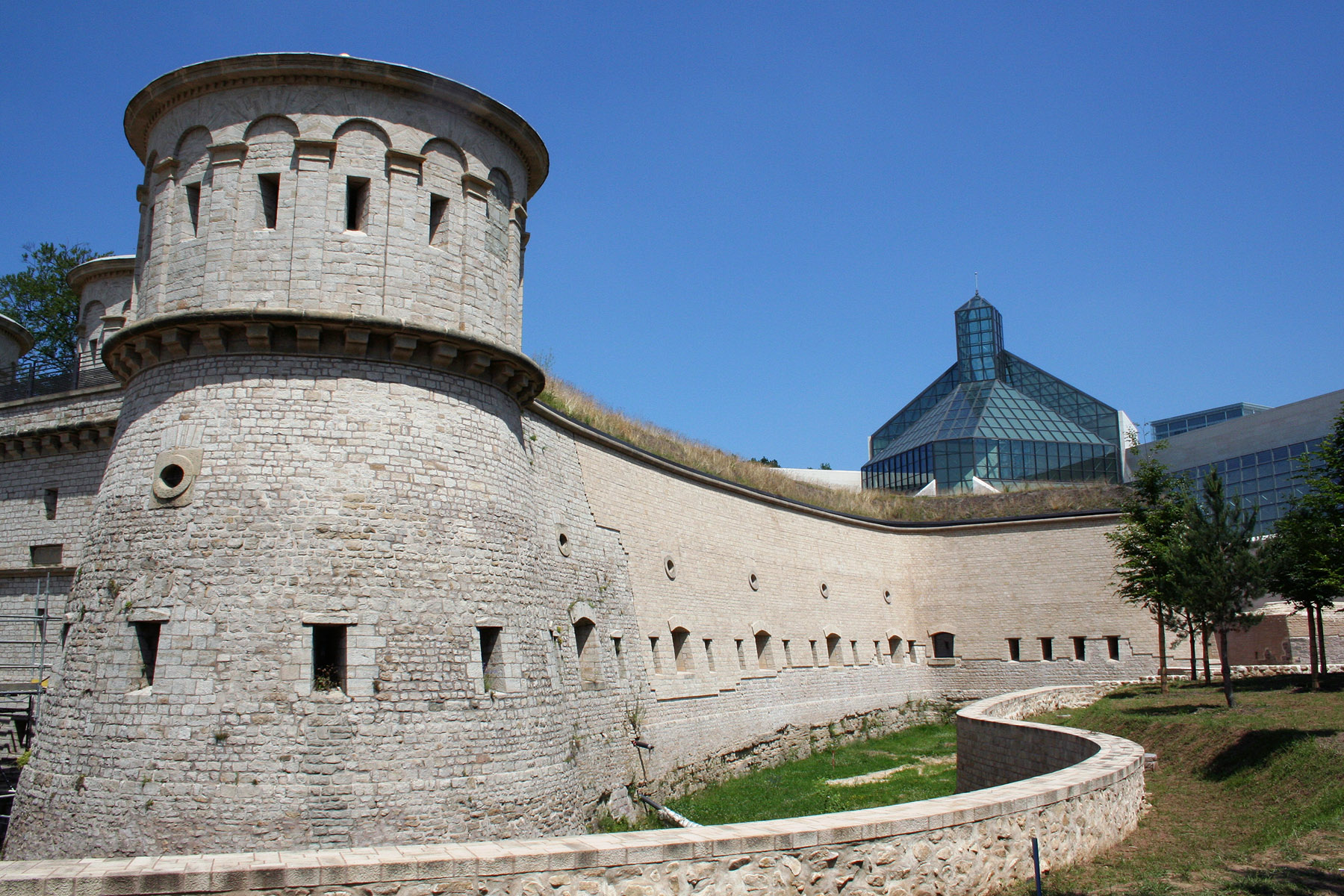
Fort Thüngen (1733)

There are a number of other buildings of architectural interest in the city of Luxembourg.

- The Grand-Ducal Palace was originally built as Luxembourg's city hall in 1573. Count Pierre Ernest de Mansfeld, the governor, was probably involved in the design. After serious damage during the siege by Vauban, major repairs were carried out in the first half of the 18th century.
- Fort Thüngen located next to the Museum of Modern Art in Luxembourg City was built by the Austrian engineer Simon de Beauffe in 1733. It was extended by the Prussians in 1837 and 1860 but was destroyed in 1874. It has now been restored.
- Neimënster Abbey in the Grund district of Luxembourg City was constructed by the Benedictine monks in 1688 and extended in 1720. It has now been fully restored and is open to the public.
- The Cercle Municipal on the Place d'Armes in the centre of Luxembourg City was built at the beginning of the 20th century as an administrative centre with reception rooms. It is now used for hosting concerts and other cultural events.
- The Hôtel de la Caisse d'Epargne, the headquarters of the Luxembourg savings bank, was constructed in the centre of Luxembourg City on the Place de Metz in 1909. The architect of the Neo-Renaissance building was the Luxembourger Jean-Pierre Koenig.
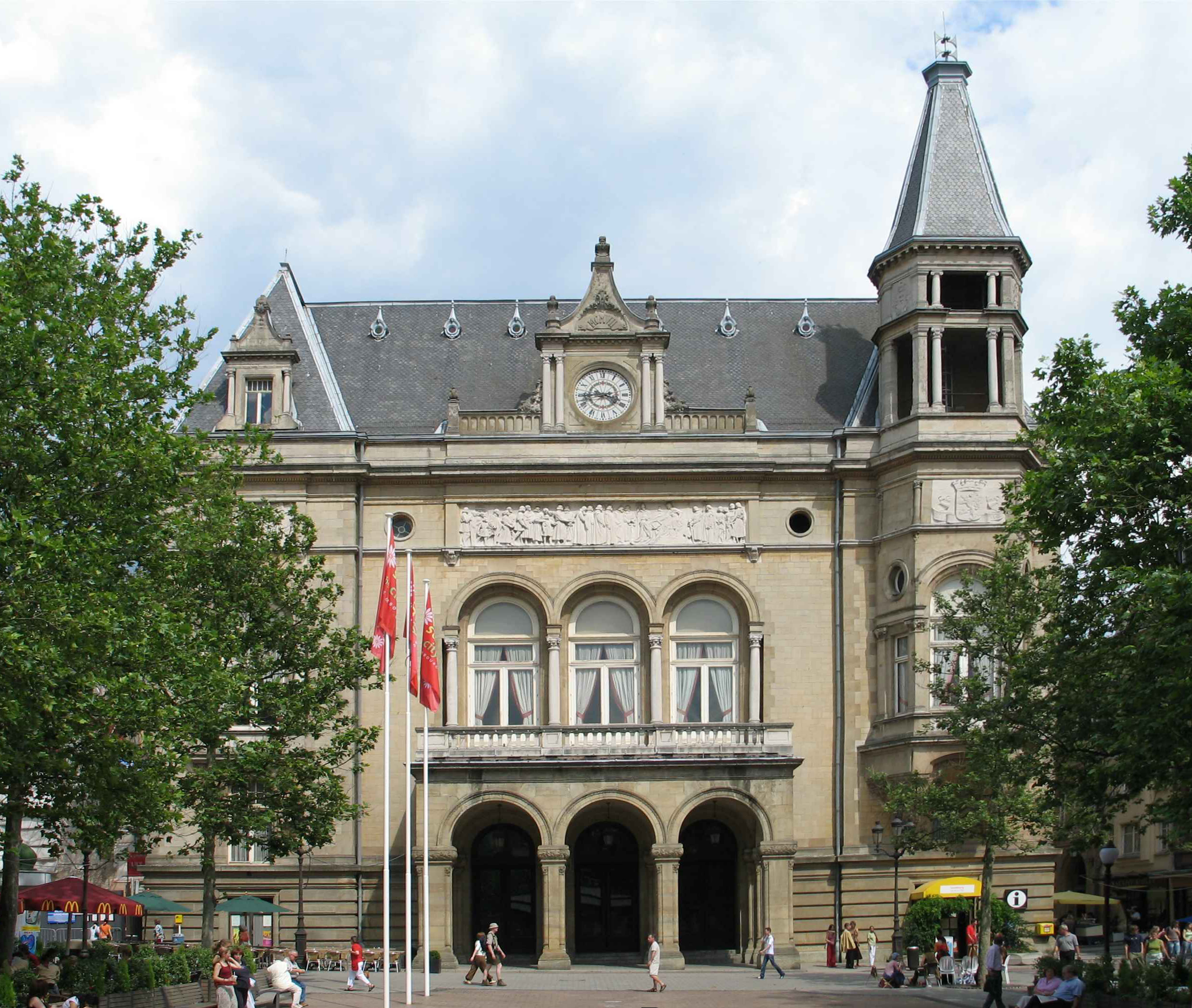
Cercle Municipal (1906)

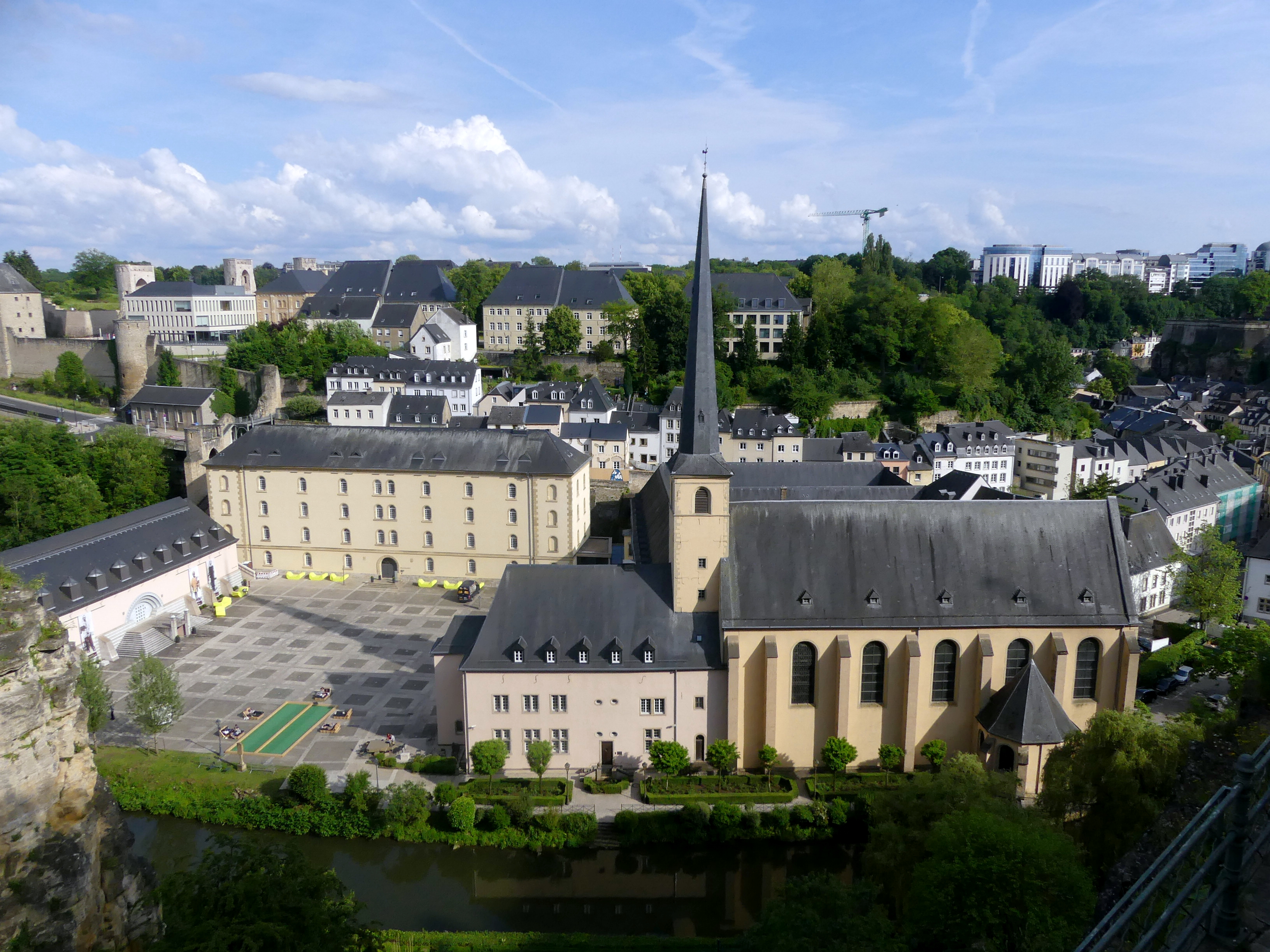
Neimënster Abbey (1688)

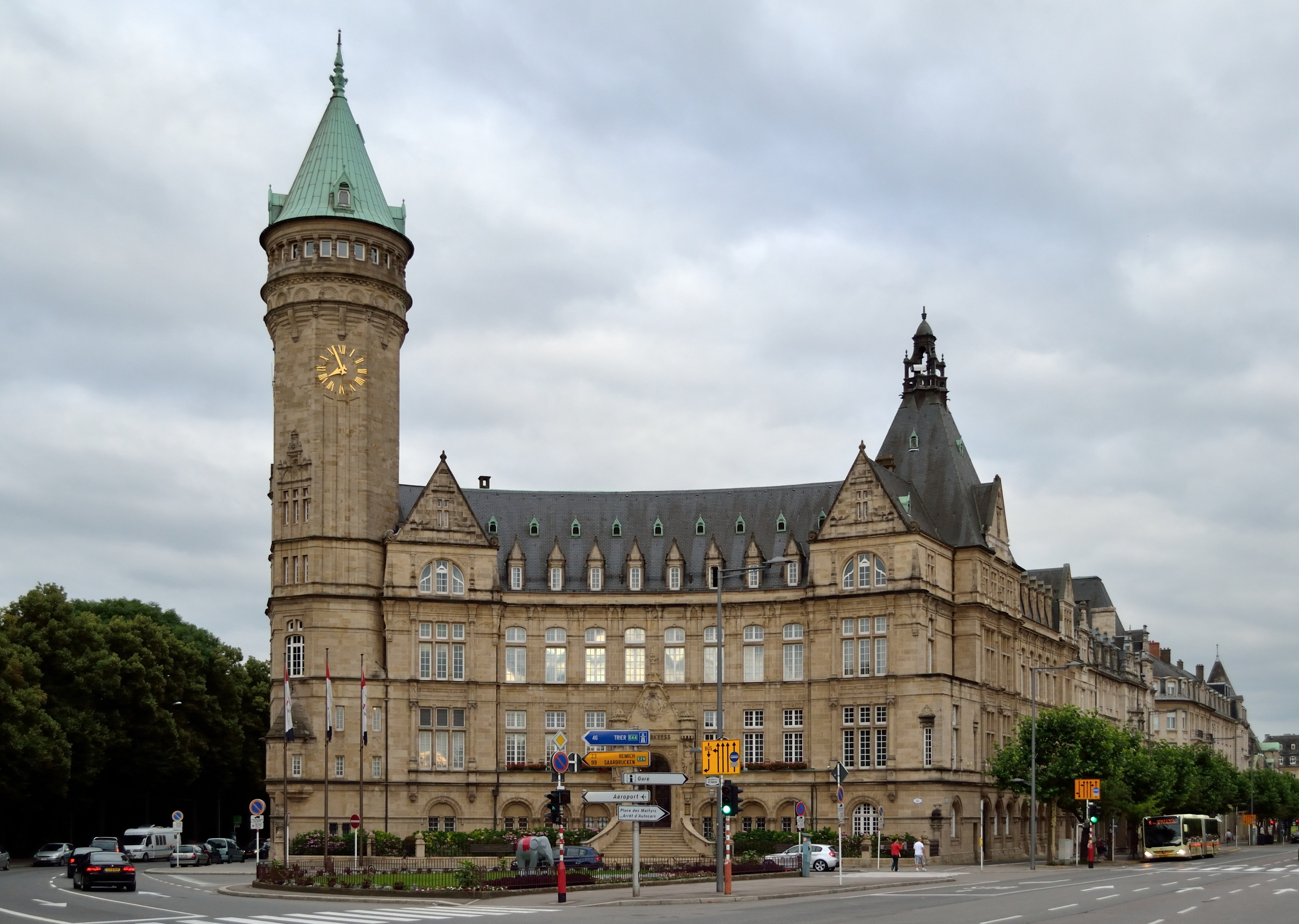
Banque et Caisse d'Épargne de l'État

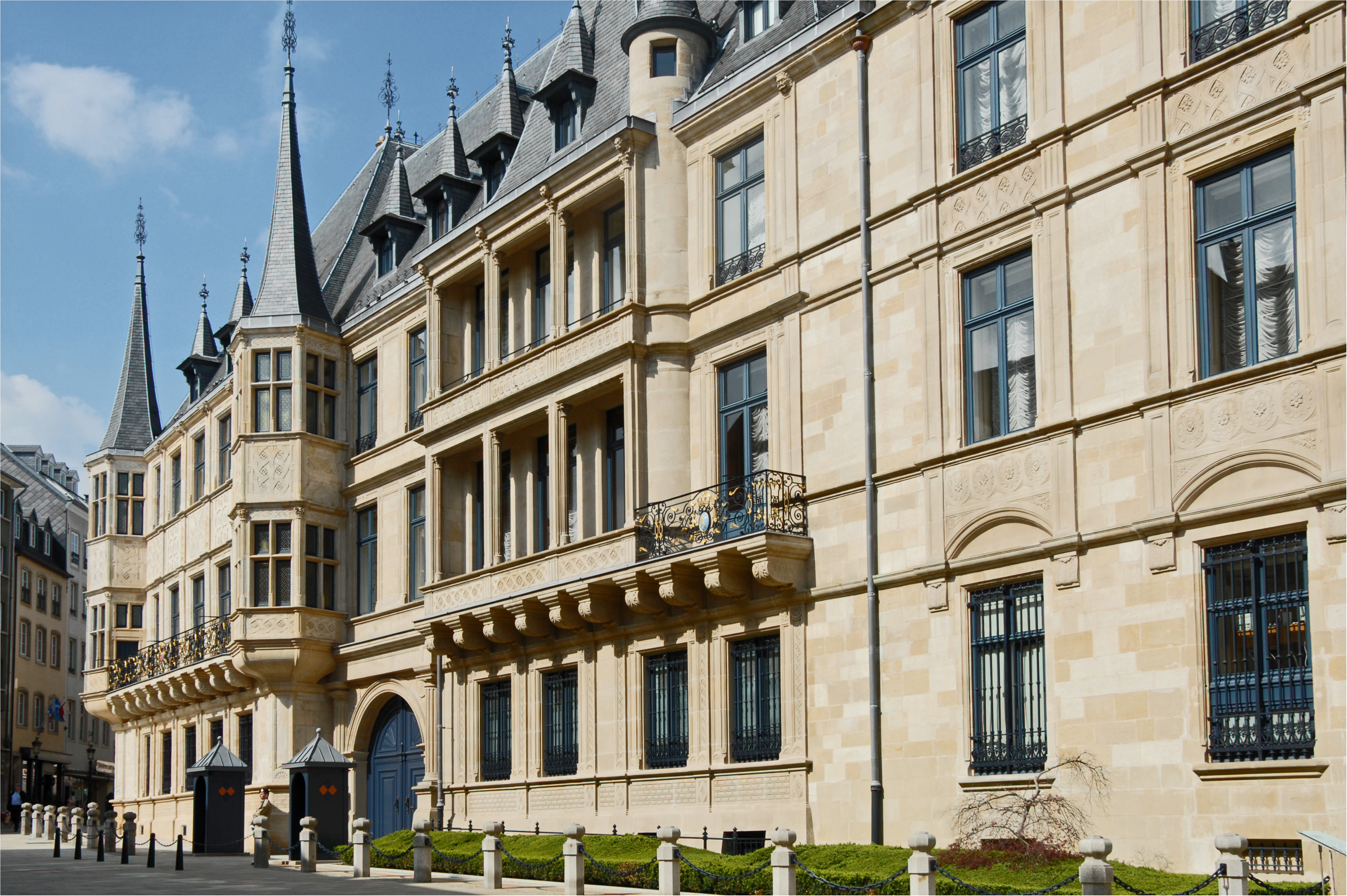
The Grand Ducal Palace (1573)

== Contemporary developments ==
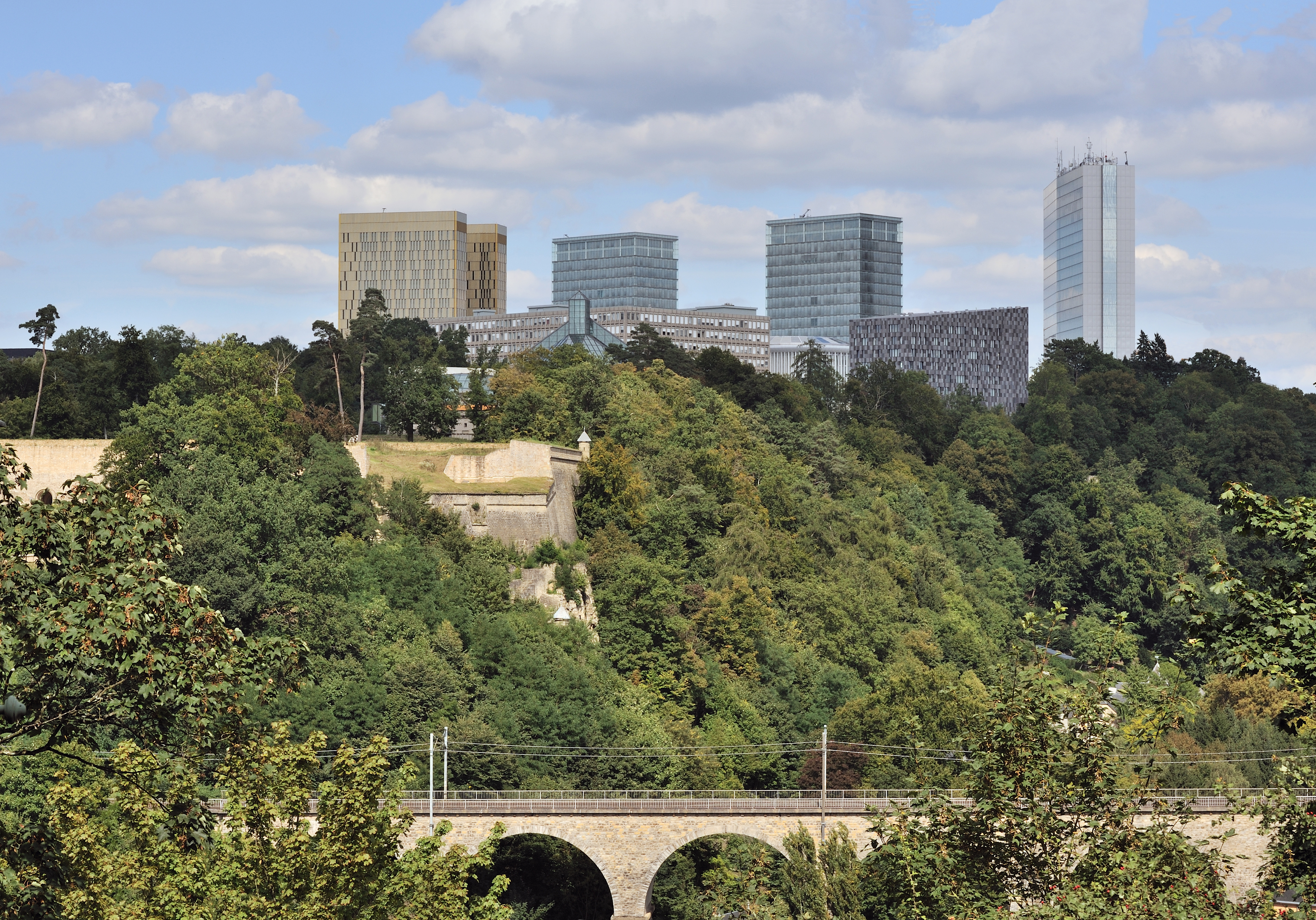
Kirchberg is home to Luxembourg's European Institutions

The 1990s were characterised by a progressive internationalization of Luxembourg's art scene, marked by the designation of the City of Luxemburg as World Heritage Site in 1994 and European Capital of Culture in 1995. This process was manifest in the architectural debate around the design of the new National Museum of History and Art by Christian Bauer et Associés, opened in 2002. International design competitions also contributed to this process, attracting notable architects like Dominique Perrault, winner of the 1996 competition for a major extension of the Court of Justice of the European Union and Bolles+Wilson, winners of the 2003 design competition for the National Library of Luxembourg.

There are several other fine examples of modern architecture in Luxembourg. These include:

- The Museum of Modern Art (2006) designed by the Chinese-American architect I. M. Pei who was responsible for the famous glass pyramid as part of his renovation of the Louvre.
- The Philharmonie (2005) concert hall designed by Christian de Portzamparc. Located on the Kirchberg plateau, the Philharmonie consists of a peristyle with 827 columns giving the impression of a cliff bearing luminous faults.
- The new European Investment Bank building (2008) designed by Christoph Ingenhoven of Ingenhoven Architects, Düsseldorf.
- The National Sports and Cultural Centre, commonly known as the Coque in view of its shell-like appearance. Designed by the French architect Roger Taillibert, it was completed in 2001.
