= Egon Jux =

German architect

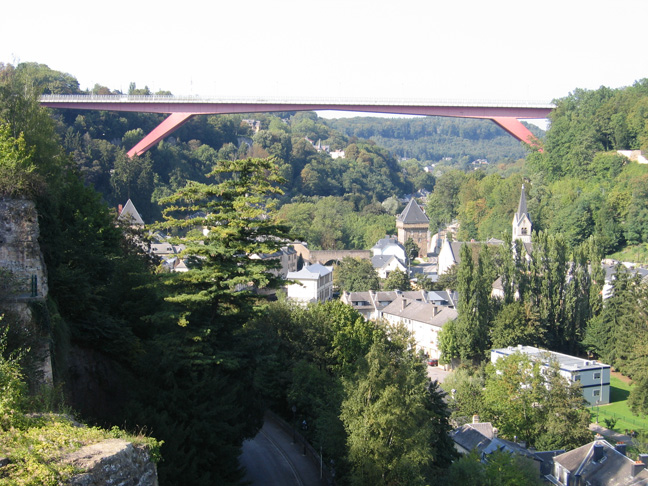
Grand Duchess Charlotte Bridge, completed in 1965

Egon Jux (17 July 1927 in Königsberg – 19 August 2008) was a German architect.

He is best known for road bridge design, including the Grand Duchess Charlotte Bridge in Luxembourg, and the Köhlbrandbrücke, Hamburg.

Jux was a student of the Swiss architect Le Corbusier.
