= Grand Duchess Charlotte Bridge =

Grand Duchess Charlotte Bridge Red Bridge Groussherzogin-Charlotte-Bréck Rout Bréck
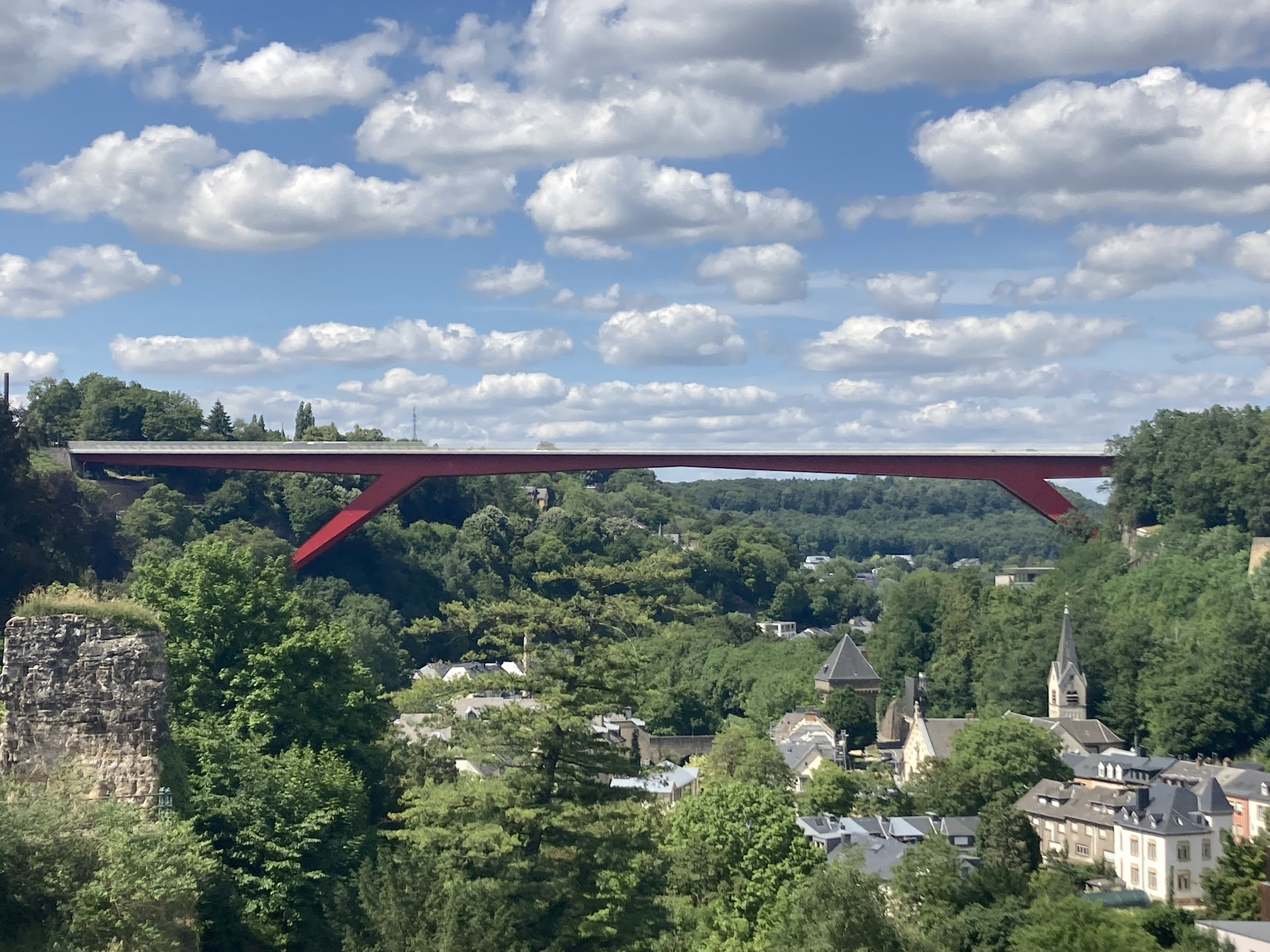
- The bridge connects Limpertsberg (left) to Kirchberg (right)
- Coordinates: 49°37′04″N 06°07′51″E
- Carries: 4 lanes of the N51, City Tram Line 1, national Cycle Path 2, pedestrians
- Crosses: River Alzette, Luxembourg City District of Pfaffenthal
- Locale: Luxembourg City
- Official name: Grand Duchess Charlotte Bridge
- Other name: Red Bridge
- Named for: Grand Duchess Charlotte
- Website: www.luxembourg-city.com/en/place/monuments/grand-duchess-charlotte-bridge

Characteristics
- Design: Batter-post rigid-frame bridge
- Material: Steel
- Total length: 355 m (1,165 ft)
- Width: 26.58 m (87 ft)
- Height: 75 m (246 ft)
- Longest span: 234.10 m (768 ft)
- No. of spans: 3

History
- Architect: Egon Jux
- Construction start: 20 April 1962 (Initial foundation works); 20 June 1963 (Ceremony for the arrival of the first segment of the support structure)
- Construction end: 2 June 1965
- Opened: 24 October 1966; 60 years ago

Location
- Interactive map of Grand Duchess Charlotte Bridge; Red Bridge

The Grand Duchess Charlotte Bridge (Luxembourgish: Groussherzogin-Charlotte-Bréck, French: Pont Grande-Duchesse Charlotte, German: Großherzogin-Charlotte-Brücke) is a road bridge in Luxembourg City, in southern Luxembourg. It carries the N51 across the Alzette, connecting Avenue John F. Kennedy, in Kirchberg, to Boulevard Robert Schuman, in Limpertsberg. The bridge is also known as the Red Bridge (Luxembourgish: Rout Bréck, German: Rote Brücke, French: Pont Rouge) on account of its distinctive red paintwork. It is the main route connecting the city centre, Ville Haute, to Kirchberg, the site of the city's European Union institutions.

== Name ==
The bridge was officially named after Grand Duchess Charlotte of Luxembourg during ceremony for the arrival of the first section of the support structure on 20 June 1963. Owing to the distinctive red colour coating of its box girder structure, residents have often referred to it as the "Red Bridge". Reaffirming this popular title for the bridge, LuxTram settled on the name of "Rout Bréck - Pafendal", for its new tram stop immediately prior to the bridge on the Kirchberg approach, which opened on 10 December 2017.

== Routes ==
The Grand Duchess Charlotte bridge carries motor vehicles, trams, pedestrians and bicycles. Together with its Kirchberg approach road, Avenue John F. Kennedy, and its Limbertsberg approach road, Boulevard Robert Schuman, the bridge forms part of the Luxembourg National Route 51 (N51). Since 28 July 2018, the bridge also forms part of the City Tram Line 1, operated by LuxTram, utilising rails installed in the surface of the deck during renovation works carried out from 2015 to 2018. Trams operating on the bridge section of the line, amongst others, use onboard batteries for traction power, charged by overhead lines elsewhere on the route. Additionally, the bridge's cycle lane is formally designated as part of Luxembourg's national Cycle Path 2, heading towards Echternach.

== History ==
=== Design Competition ===
In 1952, following a failure between the partner countries to agree on a permanent location, Luxembourg became the temporary seat of the institutions of the newly created European Coal and Steel Community (ECSC). In 1957, the "inner six" states of the ECSC agreed to accelerate cooperation with the 1958 establishments of the European Atomic Energy Community (Euratom) and the European Economic Community (EEC). In a bid to become the permanent 'capital' of what would later become known as the European Communities the Luxembourg Government sought to promote the development of the Kirchberg plateau for their use. However, the key factor in Kirchberg's largely undeveloped terrain, despite its proximity to the city centre, was its relative inaccessibility from the Luxembourg plateau, upon which Luxembourg City's historical centre is situated. In 1957, the Luxembourg Government launched a competition for designs of a bridge that would span the 75 m deep Pfaffenthal valley, through which the Alzette flows, and link the Kirchberg plateau, with Limpertsberg, on the Luxembourg plateau. Sixty-nine designs were submitted with authorities settling on a winning design by German architect Egon Jux.

=== Construction ===
Construction work on the foundations of the bridge started on 20 April 1962, with the first segment of the bridge structure arriving on 20 June 1963, marked by a ceremony attended by the Government in the presence of Grand Duchess Charlotte. The components of the twin box girders forming the structure of the bridge were first assembled in Germany, before being transported, in 3 m by 13 m segments, to the site by train and then by road. The last box girder was lifted into place on 28 October 28, 1964, with construction works completed on 2 June 1965. The bridge was subjected to overload tests involving the simultaneous passage of twelve M48 Patton tanks, of 42 tons each, made available by the Belgian army. Finally, the bridge was officially opened to traffic on 24 October 1966 by Grand Duchess Charlotte.

=== Renovations ===
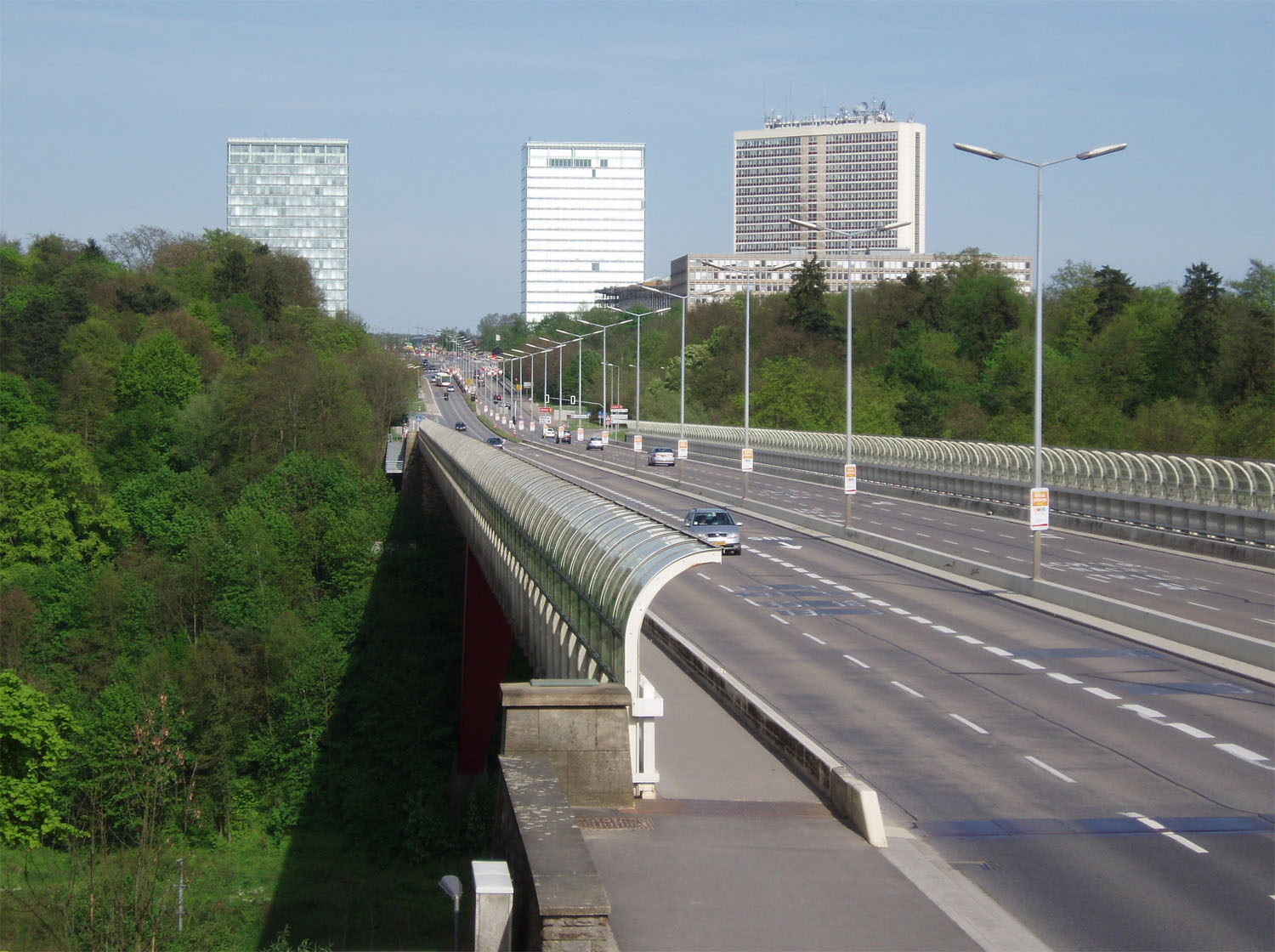
View of the bridge deck in 2005, prior to renovation

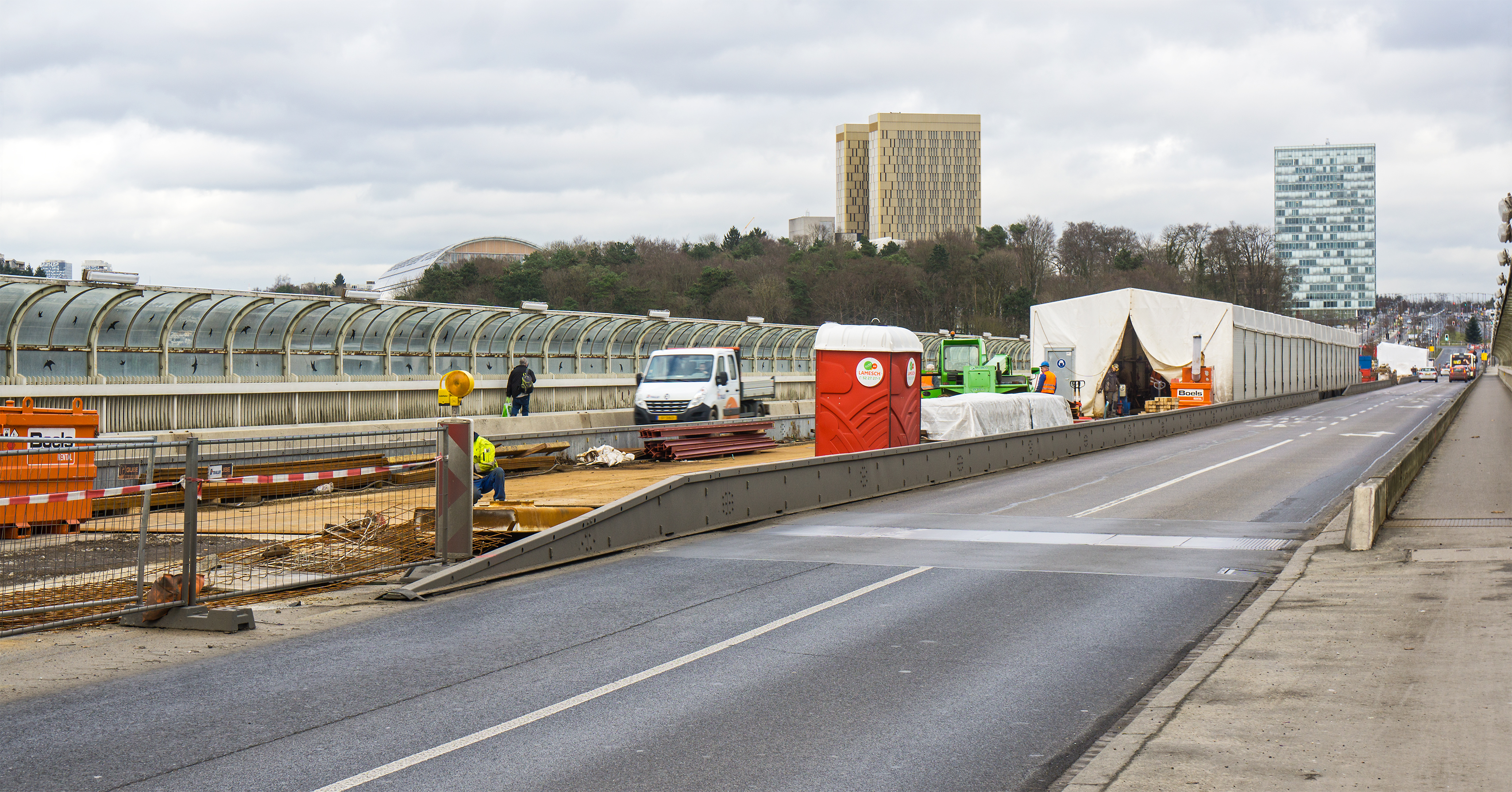
Renovation works in 2016

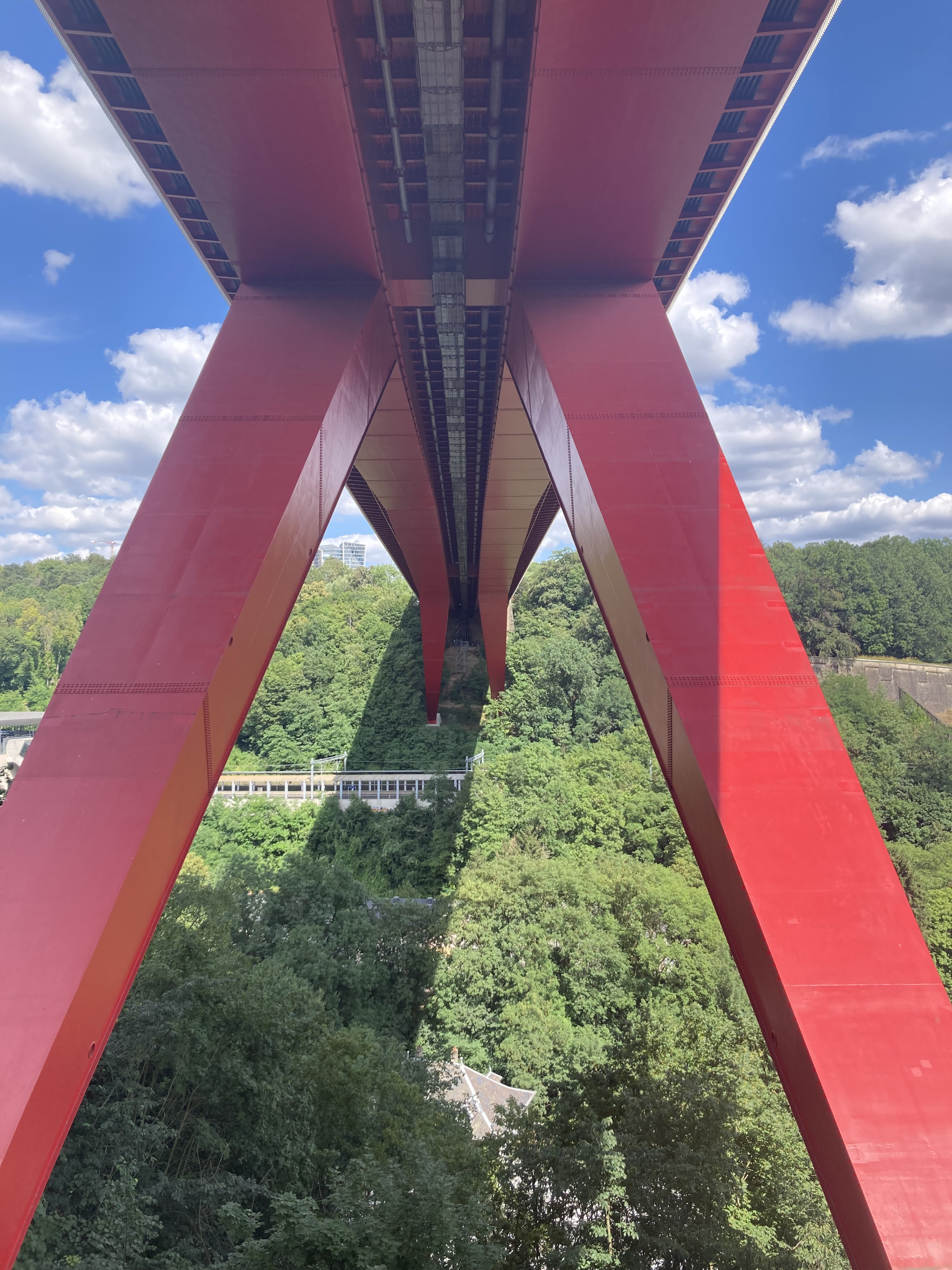
The bridge's underside, as seen from Côte d'Eich

Between 1980 and 1985, the bridge deck was resurfaced and in 1989 the bridge was repainted for the first time. Plexiglass safety barriers were erected in 1993.

Significant alterations and renovations to the bridge took place between 2015 and 2018, costing approximately €40 million, as part of plans to reintroduce trams to Luxembourg City's transport infrastructure. The road deck was strengthened and widened, and two tram lines were added, reducing road traffic from three to two lanes in each direction. Additionally, the bridge received a fresh coat of paint, new safety barriers, and new lighting.

== Characteristics ==
=== Structure and Features ===
The Grand Duchess Charlotte Bridge is of a batter-post rigid-frame bridge design. The inclined legs vary in length, with those on the Limpertsberg side measuring 40.6 m while those on the Kirchberg side measure 38.7 m.

The deck is 355 m in length and composed of three elements, respectively 95.42 m, 152.56 m and 107.02m in length. The road deck sits 75 meters above the Alzette River and is composed of an orthotropic slab of steel supported by two parallel box girders, each 6 m wide. The paved pedestrian footpaths, were originally 2.1 m each wide, with renovations carried out between 2015 and 2018, increasing this to 3.69 m on the south side, and 2.55 m on the north side. Either side of the width of the bridge deck is protected by a 2.70 m high safety barrier composed of stainless steel slats. In total, post the 2018 renovation works, the bridge deck width was increased from 25.07m to 26.58 m.

Prior to the completion of renovation works in 2018, lighting was provided by conventional tall street lights lining the middle of the central traffic barrier on the bridge deck. Post renovation works, lighting is now diffused onto the bridge deck from LEDs mounted along the interior facing sides of the steel slat safety barriers, and either side of the traffic barrier separating directions of travel, at alternating intervals, with the aim to produce a more aesthetically pleasing look, and allow a direct line of sight from one side of the bridge to the other, unobscured by street lamps.

The total weight of the bridge is approximately 5,200 tonnes including 4,785 tonnes of steel.

The distinctive red paint coat of the box girder structure results from a deliberate decision by the designers to make the bridge noticeable, even in foggy or obscure conditions.

Rails attached to the interior of the box girders beneath the bridge deck, permit the use of a vehicular platform for bridge maintenance.

=== Deck Layout ===
Following the completion of the 2018 renovation works, the bridge deck layout, from north to south includes:

- a 2.55 m wide pedestrian footpath;
- a two-lane tramway, usable by emergency vehicles, with a total width of 6.60 m;
- a 0.4 m safety buffer for road traffic;
- a roadway consisting of two traffic lanes 3 m wide each, carrying traffic towards Limbertsberg;
- a 1 m wide traffic buffer zone with barrier;
- a roadway consisting of two traffic lanes 3 m wide each, carrying traffic towards Kirchberg;
- a 0.4 m safety buffer for road traffic;
- a 3.69 m wide lane marked for use as a pedestrian footpath and bidirectional bicycle path.

== Legacy ==
=== Development of Kirchberg's European District ===
Though the EC, and later the European Union (EU), never decided on a single a seat for their basis, construction of the Grand Duchess Charlotte Bridge made it possible for Luxembourg City to today be considered one of the EU's three de facto capitals. Among other institutions based on Kirchberg are the Court of Justice of the EU, the European Investment Bank and the European Court of Auditors. The establishment of the European district in Kirchberg, led to the further successful urban development of the district promoted by the Fonds du Kirchberg.

In 2016, for the fiftieth anniversary of the bridge's inauguration, a postage stamp made by the German artist Anita Wünschmann and a 2 euro commemorative coin were issued.

=== Suicides ===
Between the Grand Duchess Charlotte Bridge's opening in 1966 and the present day, more than 100 people have committed suicide by jumping off the bridge. In 1991, Luxembourgish director Geneviève Mersch shot a short 21-minute documentary, called "The Red Bridge" (lb), in which residents of Pfaffenthal, below the bridge detailed their gruesome and macabre experiences upon witnessing the aftermath of the suicides. In 1993 the Luxembourgish government decided to erect a Plexiglas safety barrier to prevent more suicides from happening. As part of renovation work on the bridge, these were replaced in 2017, with the new stainless steel slat design.
