= Bourscheid Castle =

Coordinates: 49°54′19″N 6°04′47″E

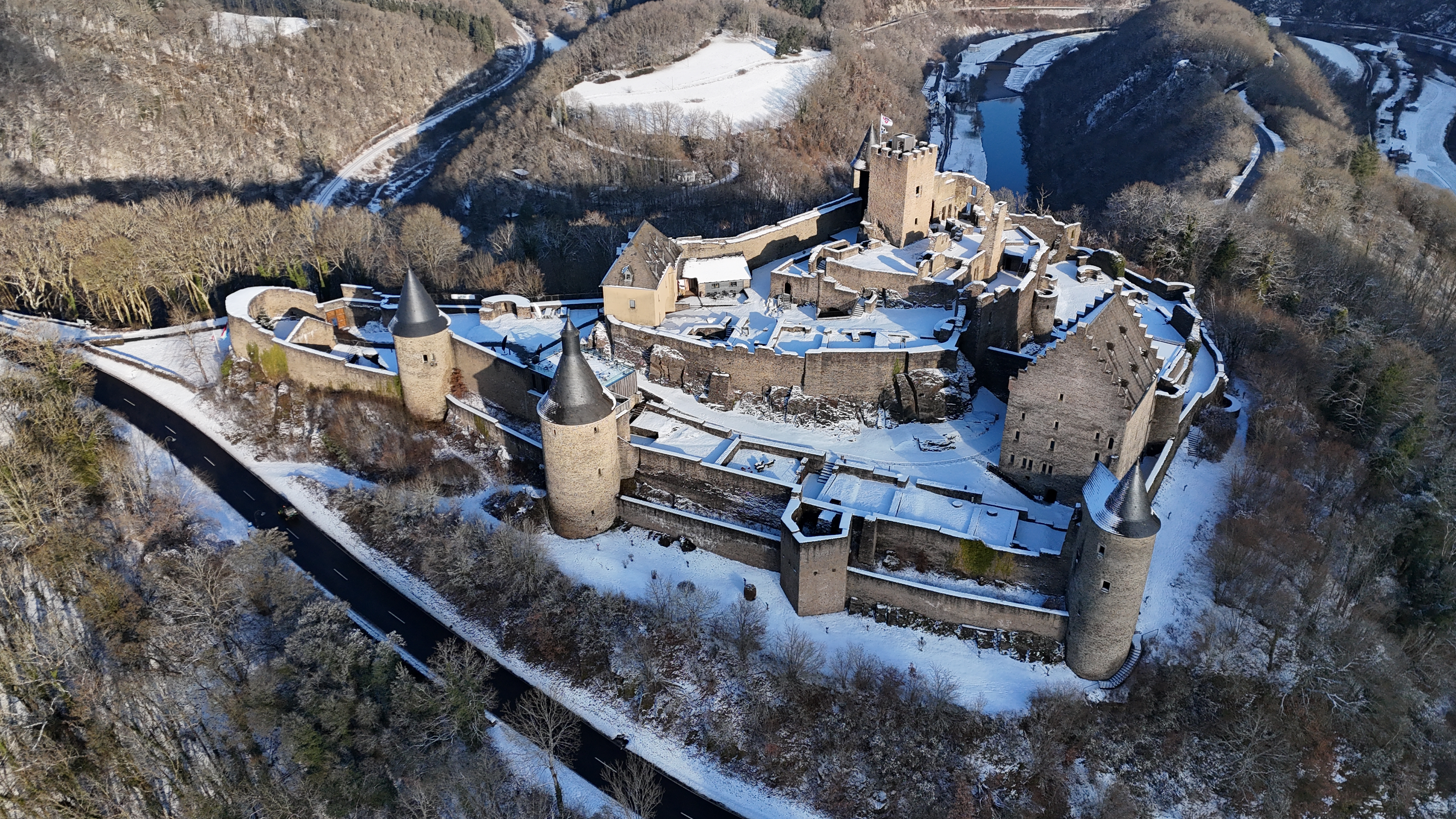
Aerial view of Bourscheid Castle in winter

Bourscheid Castle (French: Château de Bourscheid, German: Burg Bourscheid, Luxembourgish: Buerg Buerschent) is located near the village of Bourscheid in north-eastern Luxembourg. The medieval castle stands on a site with archeological evidence of structures dating back to Roman times. Standing majestically some 150 metres (490 ft) above the River Sûre, it is enclosed by a circular wall with 11 watchtowers.

== History ==
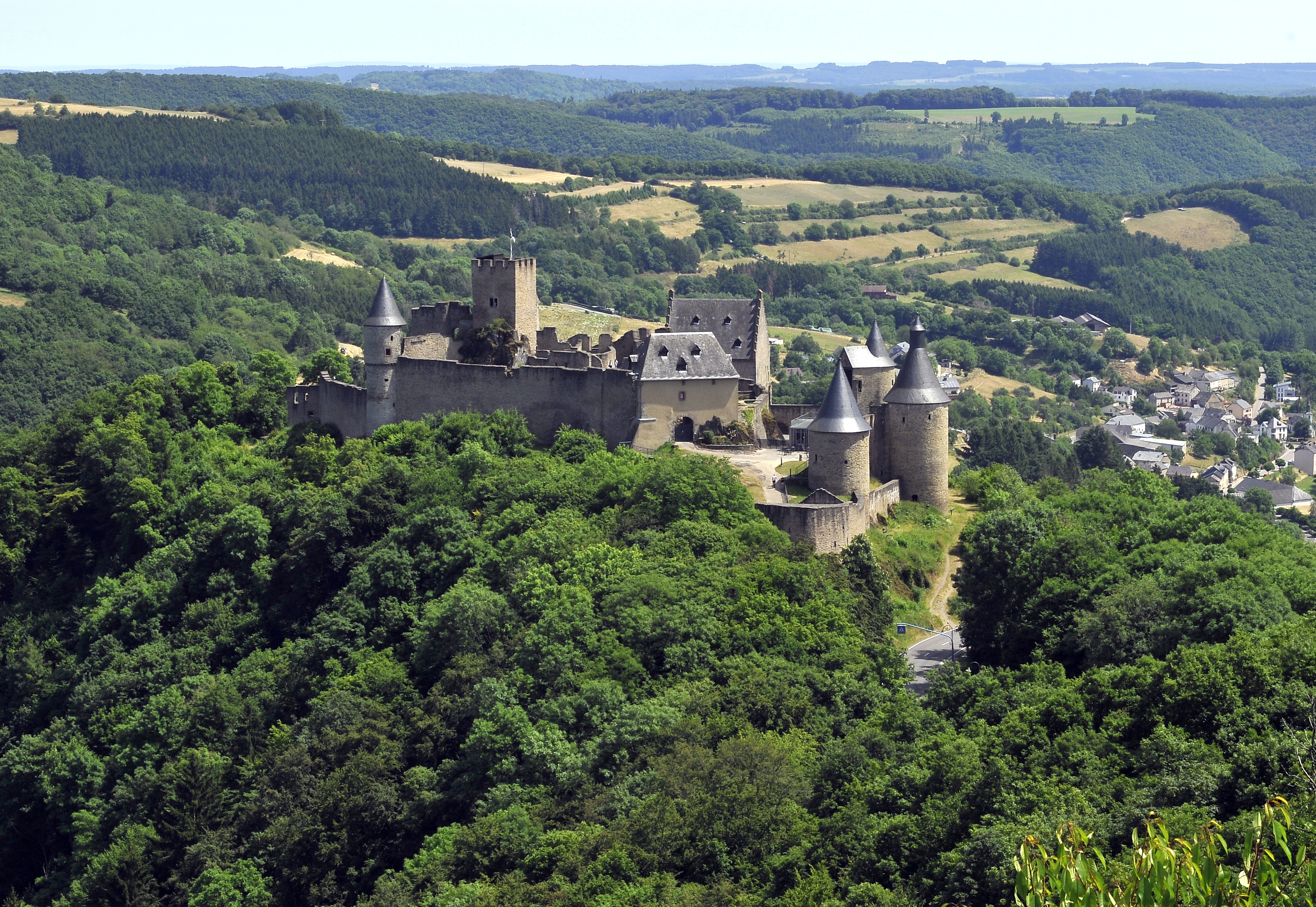
The castle and its surrounding landscape

Although first mentioned in records from 1095, the castle appears to have been built around the year 1000 on earlier foundations, in what was then the County of Luxemburg, part of the Holy Roman Empire. It was extended on several occasions: the outer wall dates from 1350, the Stolzembourg house from 1384, and the courtyard from 1477. Behind the gateway from the end of the 15th century, a ditch protected by four towers barred access to the upper and lower castles. The southern and eastern towers are from 1498 and the artillery bastions were built in the 16th century.

The extension of the upper part of the castle took place in the 15th century while the great fireplace and tall chimney were completed about a hundred years later. After 1626 it was owned by the House of Metternich, before the French Revolution put an end to their feudal power. Schenk von Schmidtburg, who acquired the castle at the end of the 18th century, undertook some repair work but was unable to prevent further degradation. In the 19th century, after the chapel collapsed, there was talk of demolishing the building. However, in 1936 it became a listed site and in 1972, with the encouragement of an association called the Friends of the Castle of Bourscheid, the State acquired the building and undertook extensive repairs. As a result of restoration work, the castle is now fully accessible to visitors, but remains a predominantly open-air ruin. An audio tour is available in Luxembourgish, German, French, Dutch, and English. Publication of the Bourscheid historical archives has provided details of the castle and its former inhabitants.

== Visiting times ==
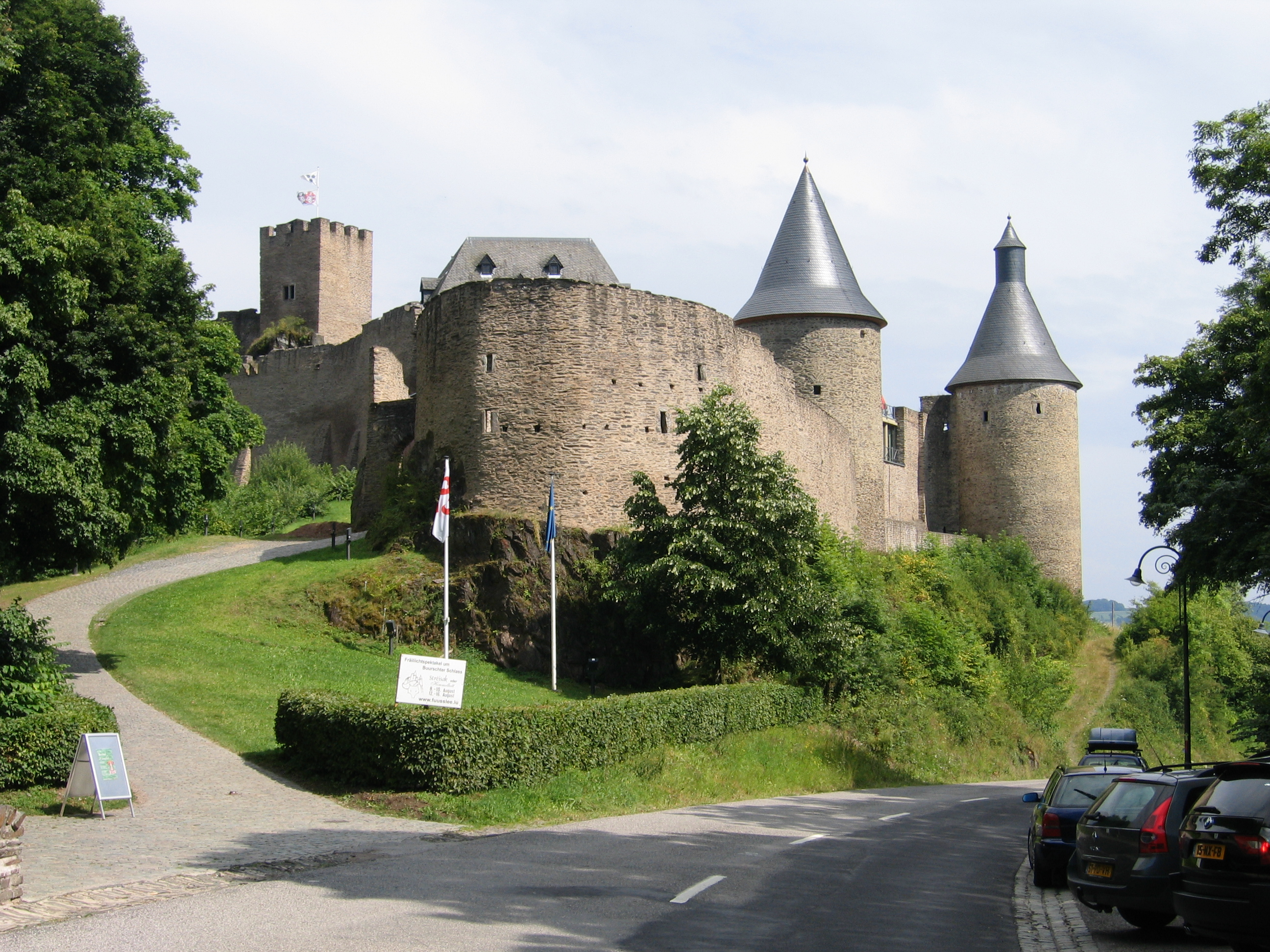
Entrance to Bourscheid Castle

The castle is open to visitors all the year round: 1 April to 15 October from 9.30 am to 6 pm and 16 October to 31 March from 11 am to 4 pm.

Full-price admission to the castle costs seven euros, with discount prices available for adults, students, and children. Admission includes an audio-guide. Audio guides are not available for guests who arrive within 90 minutes of closing.

== See also ==
- List of castles in Luxembourg
