= Bourbon Plateau =

Plateau and neighbourhood of Luxembourg City, Luxembourg

Coordinates: 49°36′18″N 6°07′42″E

Bird's eye view of the neighbourhood

The Bourbon Plateau is a plateau and neighbourhood of Luxembourg City that was named after the Fort Bourbon, part of the Fortress of Luxembourg.

== Overview ==
The Bourbon Plateau appears as a homogeneous urban constructed whole, within the more varied-looking Gare district. Through its imposing structures and historicist facades, and its tree-covered pavements, it is described as giving off a certain Parisian flair. The Bourbon Plateau neighbourhood consists of eight building complexes with closed perimeter development and the former ARBED building, with the Rose Garden in the middle. It is bordered lengthwise by the bridgehead with the Banque et Caisse d'Épargne de l'État at the Adolphe Bridge and the Place de Paris, and crosswise by the Boulevard de la Pétrusse and the Rue Zithe. The Avenue de la Liberté – originally the Avenue Adolphe – forms the spine of the Bourbon Plateau and reaches down to the railway station, which is visible from the Adolphe Bridge.

== History ==
The 1867 Treaty of London declared Luxembourg a neutral and independent state, and obliged the Prussian garrison to withdraw. The fortifications of the Fortress of Luxembourg were to be demolished or rendered unusable. When the corset of the fortifications had disappeared, the city could expand for the first time since the 14th century. This opened up areas outside the old city centre and fortress for development, including the Bourbon Plateau.

=== Plan and development ===
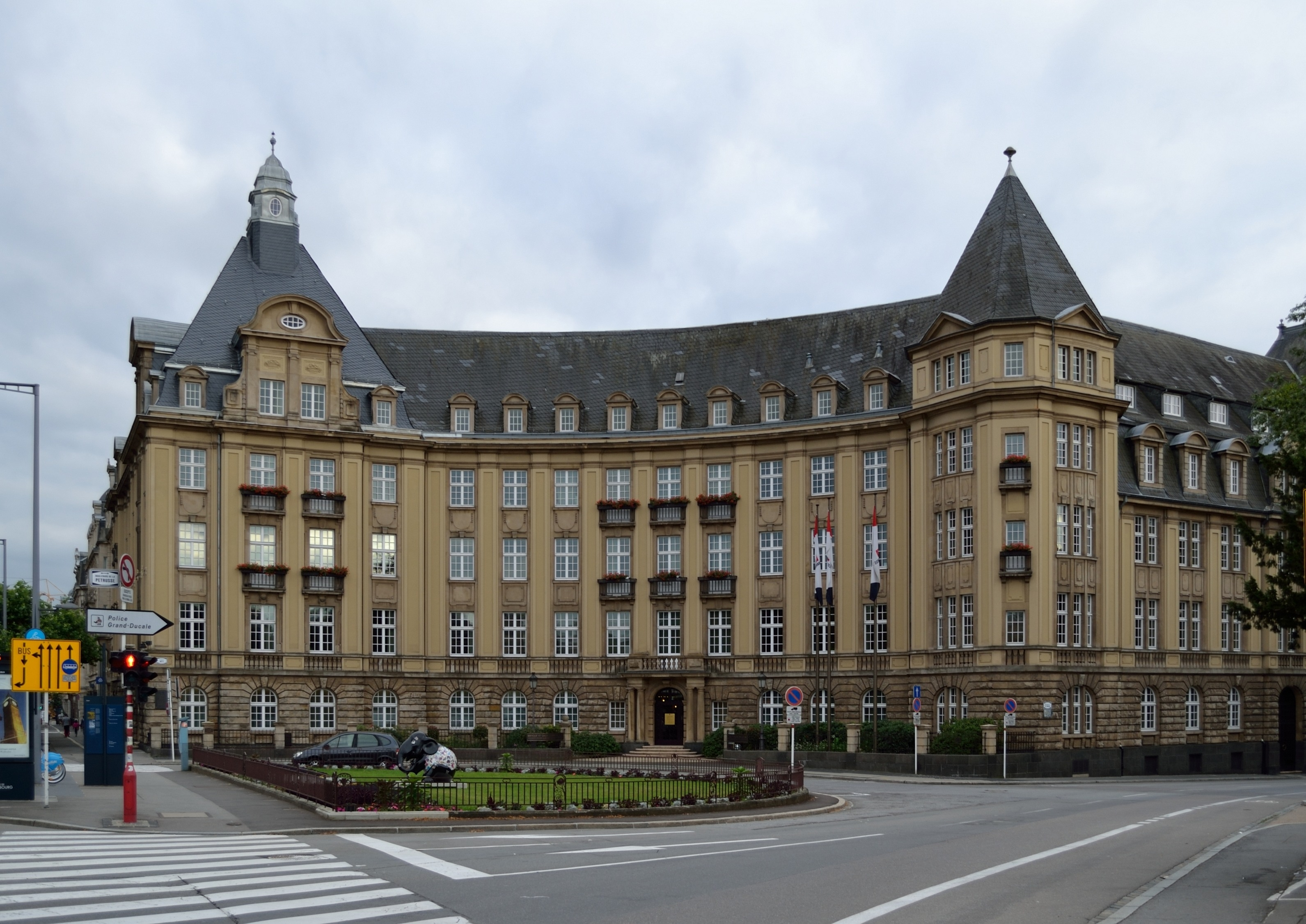
BCEE building on the Place de Metz, formerly the seat of the European Coal and Steel Community

The Bourbon Plateau developed in a more homogeneous way than the area around the railway station. Its layout was planned according to an overall concept elaborated by the public authorities, with the cooperation of renowned experts such as Joseph Stübben and Edouard André. Its development was executed by young, Luxembourgish architects educated at prestigious European schools of architecture, under the oversight of the government architect Sosthène Weis. The primary driving force behind the plan was the prime minister Paul Eyschen, who endeavoured to give the capital city a visual identity.

The newly created district was constructed according to a strict set of government rules, inspired by the historicist, Neo-Renaissance, Neo-Baroque, or the then-popular Neo-classicist styles. The Banque et Caisse d'Épargne de l'État building (BCEE) (1910) was constructed by the architect Jean Pierre König and later extended by Jos Nouveau and Léon Muller. The design of the buildings at the bridgehead of the Pont Adolphe was intended to create a counterpart to the old city centre. This ensemble was only completed with the headquarters of German Imperial Railways in Alsace-Lorraine (architect: Karl Jüsgen). The building in the German Wilhelmist style appears more austere than the BCEE building with its richly designed facade, its alcoves and towers. It later served as the seat of the European Coal and Steel Community.

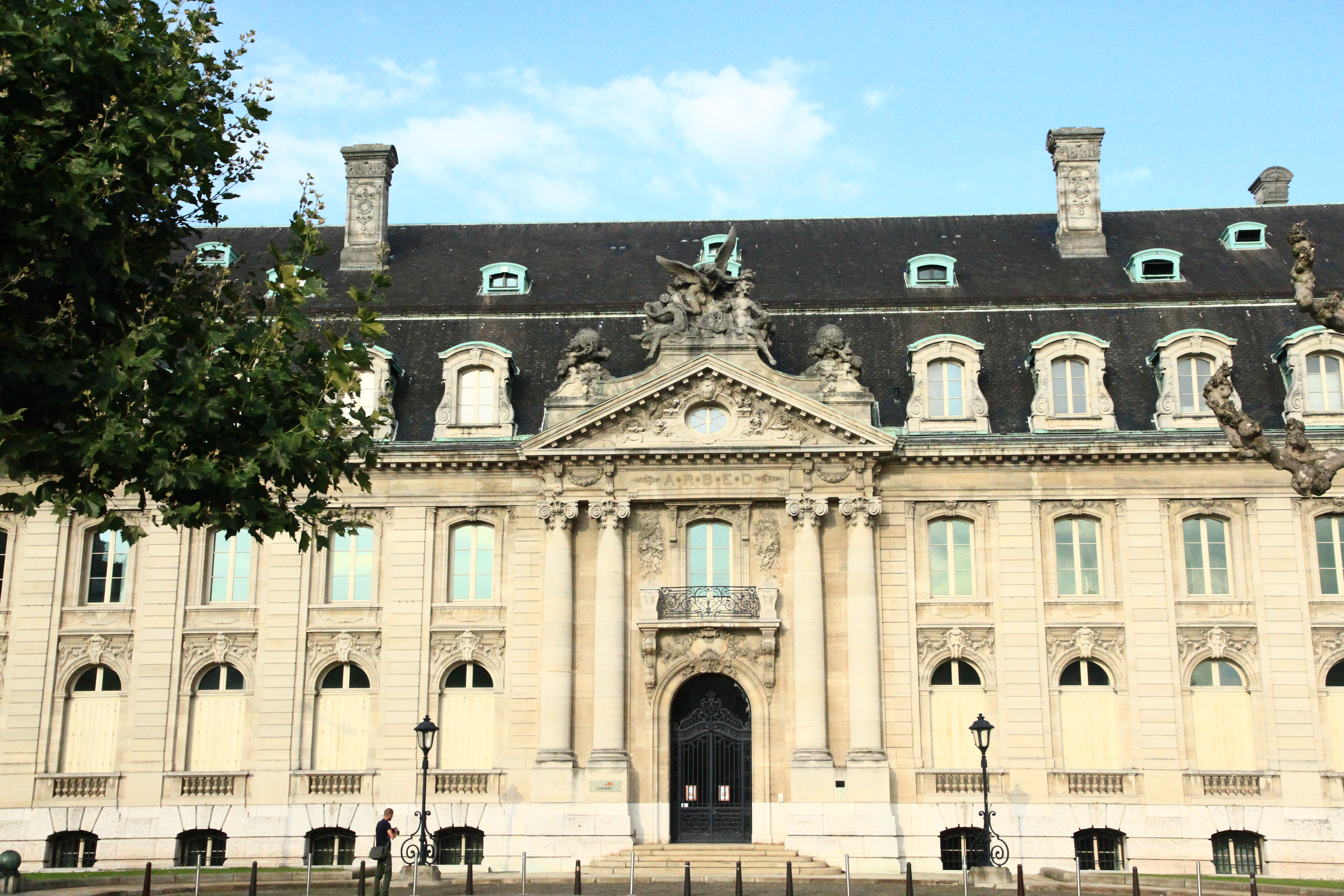
ARBED building

The Belgian René Théry drew up the plans for the ARBED headquarters in 1920. The former government architect Sosthène Weis was responsible for the execution. As a symbol of power, the palace-like building was built with four wings and an inner courtyard, showing an undeniable French 18th century influence. Further noteworthy buildings on the Bourbon Plateau are the Jugendstil Villa Clivio for the building contractor Cesare Clivio, the Maison Pier (1903), a highly structured town house of the architect Mathias Martin and the Streckeisen (Lux.: "flat iron") (1907), which came into being through the intersection of three streets at the Boulevard de la Pétrusse (architect: Jean Guill). In 2006 this building was turned into student flats.

=== Building regulations ===
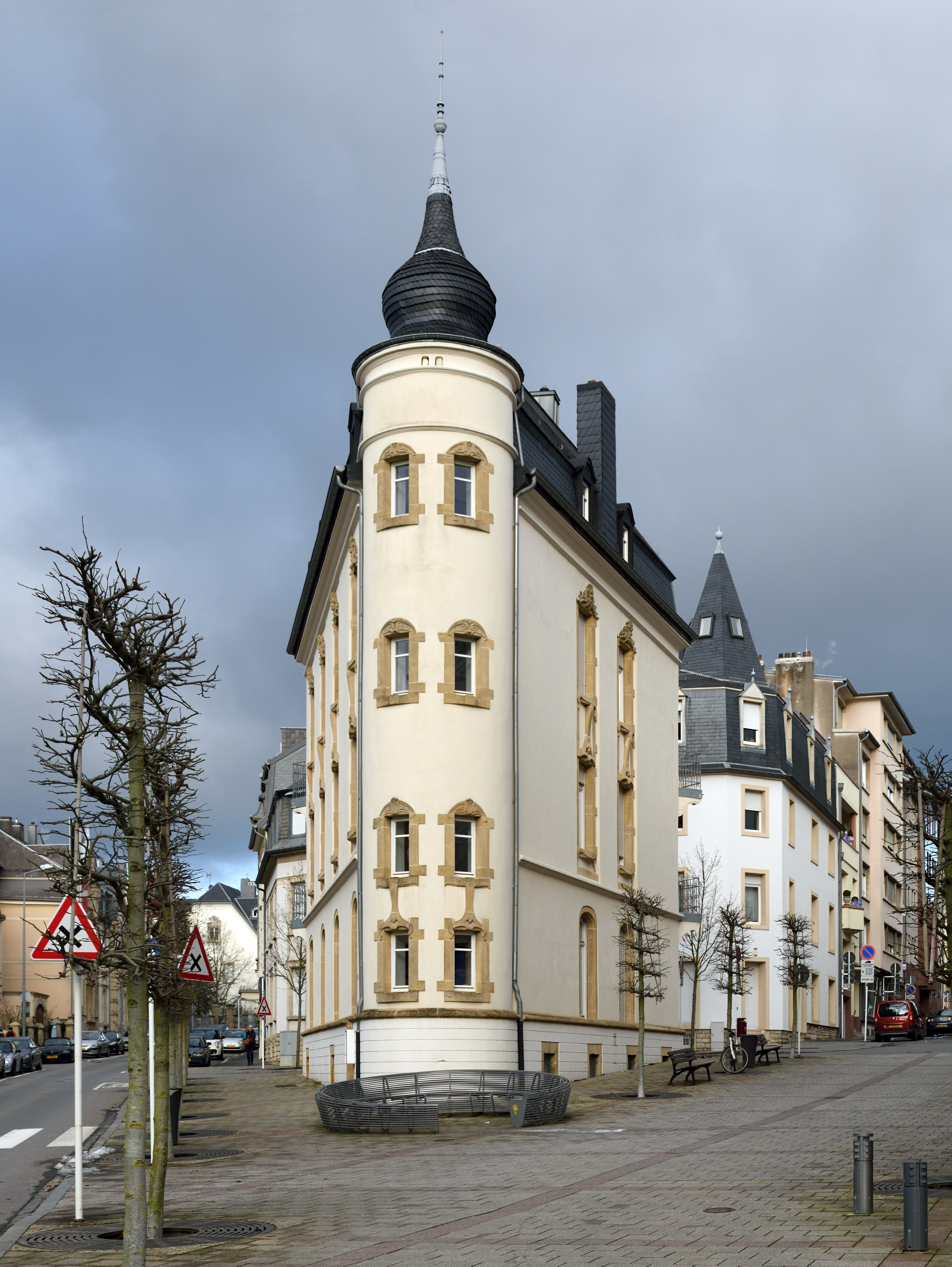
The "Flat Iron" building, constructed 1907

Some districts of the city have undergone significant architectural change in recent decades. This includes the districts in and around Ville Haute, the large Boulevards and the southern part of Limpertsberg as well as the area round the railway station. These areas had come into being as part of the city's expansion in the late 19th and early 20th centuries. Many older houses here were replaced by new constructions, to get a higher rate of income from real estate or because renovating the buildings would have cost money and time. This is a still on-going process in the city, from which few districts have been spared. One of these is the Bourbon Plateau, where building regulations contain provisions to protect the cityscape, so that building facades principally need to be preserved.

== See also ==
- ARBED building
- Avenue de la Liberté
- Place des Martyrs
- Banque et Caisse d'Épargne de l'État

== References and further reading ==
- Langini, Alex (2007). "«Il faut que ce soit pittoresque»" (PDF). forum (in French) (267/268): 29–30.
- Linster, Alain (2010). "Luxembourg in Progress - Ein architektonischer Streifzug durch die Stadt" (PDF). ons stad (in German) (95): 4–11.
- Lorang, Antoinette (2010). "Plateau Bourbon: Ein späthistoristisches Bauensemble" (PDF). ons stad (in German) (95): 22–27.
