= Am Tunnel =

Coordinates: 49°36′23″N 06°07′42″E

Am Tunnel is a contemporary art gallery, situated in a tunnel in Luxembourg City, in southern Luxembourg. The gallery is located in part of the underground casemates of the city's ancient fortress, under the Bourbon plateau, in the northern part of the Gare district. It is connected to the former headquarters of Banque et Caisse d'Épargne de l'État (BCEE), the third-largest bank based in Luxembourg.

In 1987, BCEE launched a plan to extend the former casemate, so that it would connect the bank's four buildings that lie on the plateau. The possible usage of the tunnel itself was debated, and the idea was formed to turn the tunnel into a gallery. Construction began in 1992, and the gallery was opened in 1993. It is primarily dedicated to hosting works by more than a hundred Luxembourgish artists, particularly the photographer Edward Steichen, to whom a permanent collection is dedicated. However, the gallery also hosts retrospectives of other artists.
