= Hôtel de la Chambre =

- Chambersgebai
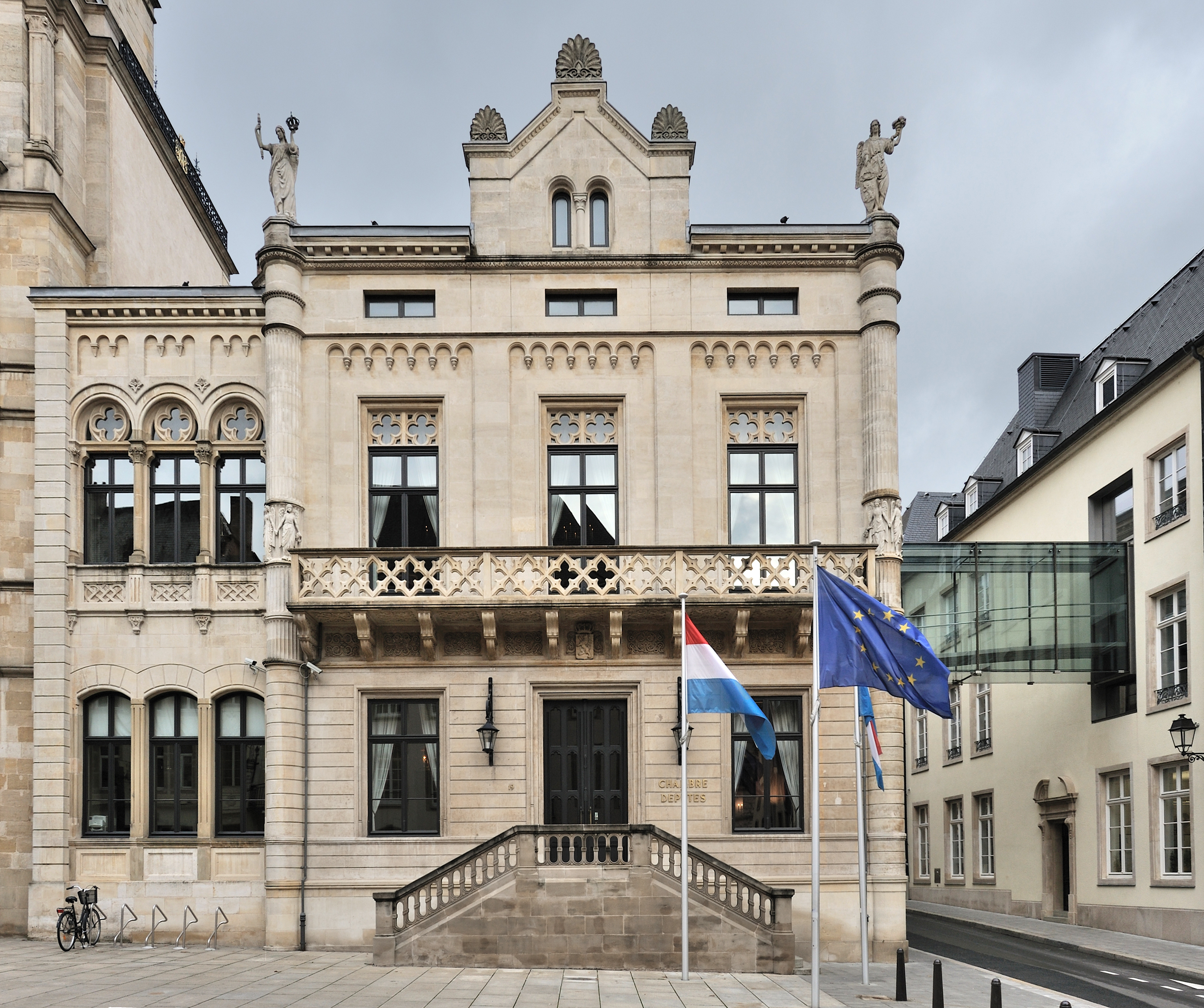
- Interactive map of the Hôtel de la Chambre area

General information
- Type: Legislative building
- Location: Ville Haute, Luxembourg City, 19 Rue du Marché-aux-Herbes, L-1728, Luxembourg
- Coordinates: 49°36′38.25″N 06°07′59.06″E
- Current tenants: Seat of the Chamber of Deputies
- Construction started: 27 July 1858
- Inaugurated: 30 October 1860; 165 years ago
- Renovated: 1881; 1997–1999
- Owner: State of Luxembourg

Design and construction
- Architect: Antoine Hartmann

The Hôtel de la Chambre des Députés (English: Hall of the Chamber of Deputies) is the meeting place of the Luxembourgish national legislature, the Chamber of Deputies, in Luxembourg City, in southern Luxembourg.

It is located on the Krautmaart (French: Rue du Marché-aux-Herbes), an irregularly shaped street in the Ville Haute, the historic heart of the city. Adjacent to the Chamber is the Grand Ducal Palace, the official residence of the Grand Duke of Luxembourg, to which it has a direct link via a gangway built in the 19th century and expanded since.

Due to the Hôtel's location, 'Krautmaart' has become a metonym for the Chamber of Deputies itself.

== History ==
Until 1860, the Chamber of Deputies had no regular meeting place, variably holding sessions in the Grand Ducal Palace, Luxembourg City Hall, and the Hôtel du Gouvernement. For a period after the promulgation of Luxembourg's constitution in 1848, the Chamber met in a primary school in Ettelbruck, in the north of the country. By the late 1850s, this was becoming untenable, and to restore the Grand Ducal Palace to the use of the Grand Ducal Family, plans were laid for the construction of a dedicated home for the Chamber in 1857 by Antoine Hartmann. Construction began on 27 July 1858, and the building was inaugurated on 30 October 1860, upon the opening of a new parliamentary session.

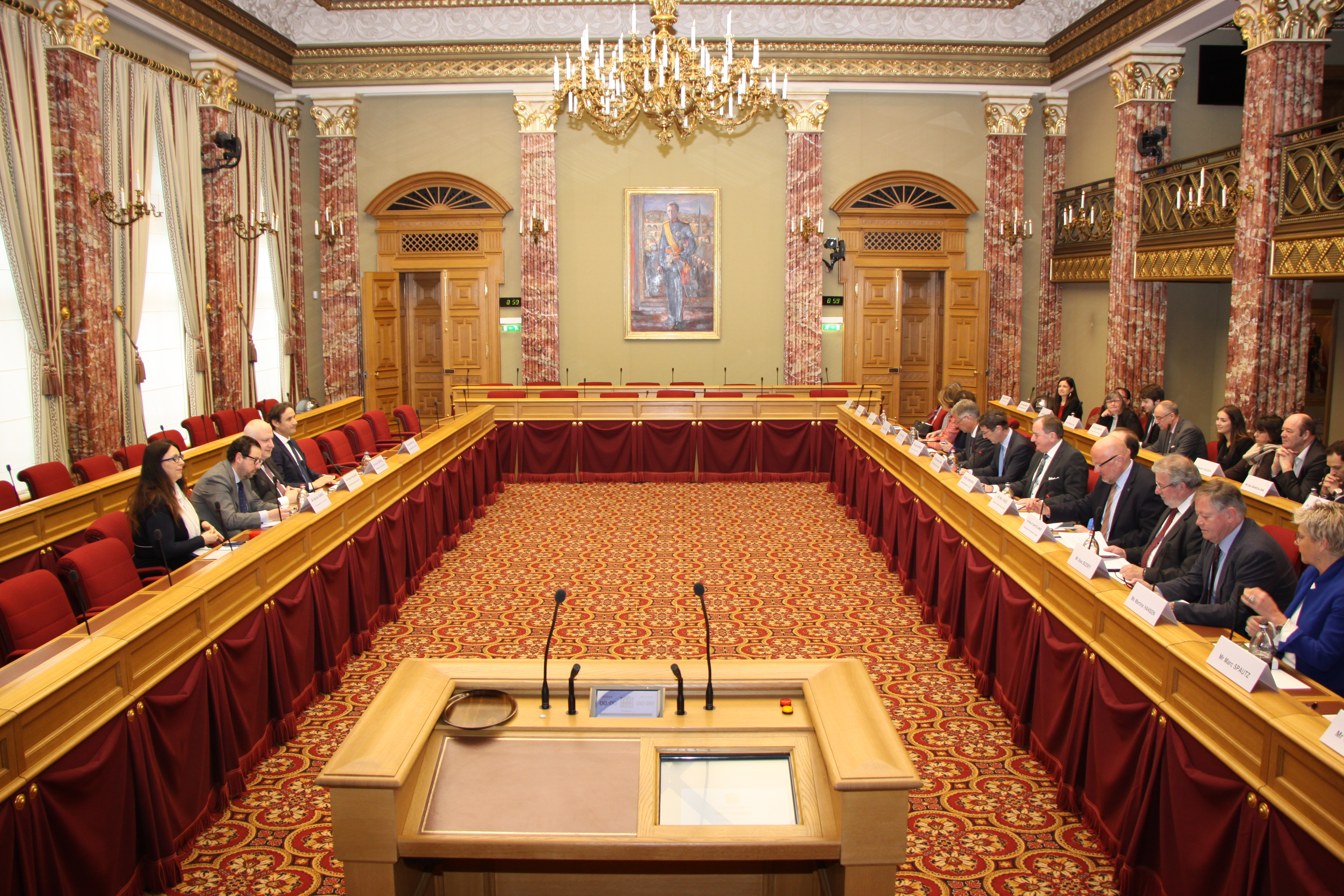
The plenary meeting room viewed from the President's chair during a meeting with OECD representatives

During the German occupation of Luxembourg in World War II, the Chamber of Deputies was abolished and the building's functions made subservient to those of the occupation forces. The building was turned into the headquarters of the Luxembourgish branch of the Reich Propaganda Office (German: Reichspropagandaamt), and minor modifications were made, such as Luxembourgish state symbols being painted over and an Imperial Eagle (German: Reichsadler) being displayed in the plenary hall. The balcony was decorated with a large sign hailing the Heim ins Reich, while, later on, large Swastika flags were flown on the outside.

=== Proposals for a new Chamber seat ===
As early as 1880, complaints were made by deputies that the Hôtel de la Chambre was too small, and that this deprecated the working conditions for parliamentary proceedings. In 1901, then-Chamber President Charles-Jean Simon lodged an official complaint with the government, to little avail. These grievances persisted over the course of the 20th century, leading to a number of proposals being made to move the Chamber of Deputies to a larger, more accommodating seat, but none of these were realised.

In the mid-1950s, it was suggested to build a spacious new seat for the Chamber on the Place des Martys, just across from the ARBED building in the Gare district. This project was abandoned in order the fund the construction of new headquarters for the CFL instead.

Some 20 years later, in the 1970s, a similar plan was to erect a new headquarters with a hemicycle plenary hall and ample space for offices and meeting rooms on the Saint-Esprit plateau, at the south-eastern edge of the Ville Haute. In July 1980, the Chamber even passed a bill authorising its construction, but the project was ultimately shelved due to budgetary constraints, as the Luxembourgish economy was in the midst of a steel crisis. The Saint-Esprit plateau would later become the site of the new Judiciary City designed by Luxembourgish New Classical architect Rob Krier.

In 1995, a bill introduced by Public Works Minister Robert Goebbels proposed to completely transform the Maisons Printz et Richard building complex, adjacent to the Hôtel de la Chambre, and turn into a new seat for the Chamber, designed by Krier and notably featuring a new, semicircular plenary hall. The project was quickly abandoned, with it being apparent that the City of Luxembourg, on the grounds of preservation of built heritage, would not deliver a construction permit, and with the Chamber voting unanimously to maintain the old plenary hall.

Between 1997 and 1999, as the Chamber's seat had become excessively small compared to the institution's size, as well as outdated in terms of safety and accessibility norms, major renovations were undergone, and the building expanded to accommodate the public. The dilapidated wooden decor was replaced by replicas in the original style, with the structural supports strengthened and reconfigured to comply with more stringent health and safety standards. Meanwhile, the expansion, to receive the public and perform ancillary functions, was built in a modern style. During this time, the Chamber convened in the City Hall, just as it had 140 years previously.
