= Spuerkeess Building =

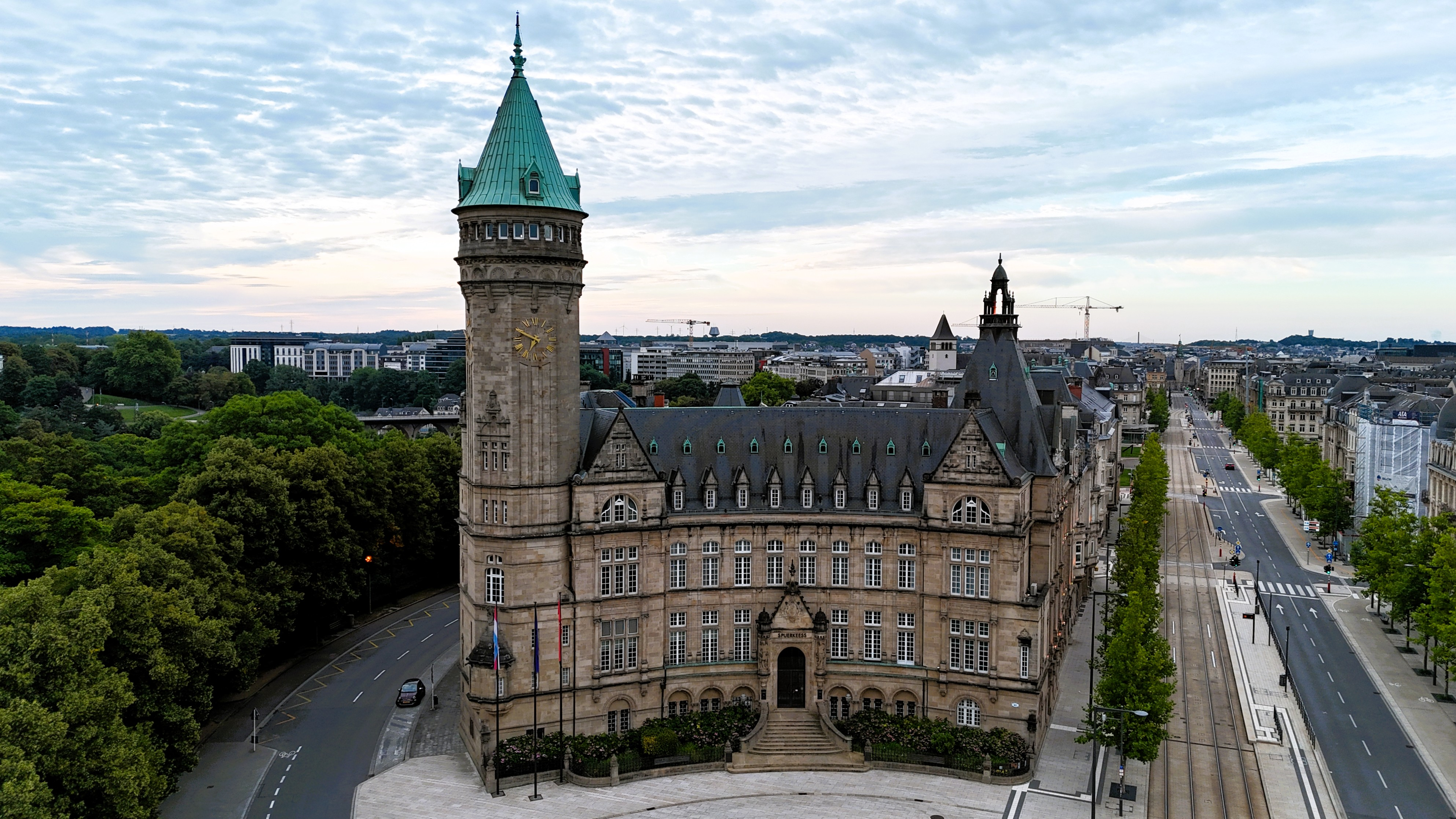
- The Spuerkeess Building in 2025
- Click on the map for a fullscreen view

General information
- Location: Luxembourg City, Luxembourg
- Coordinates: 49°36′26.33″N 6°07′42.67″E

The Spuerkeeess Building (French: Palais de la Banque et caisse d'épargne de l'État, Luxembourgish: Spuerkeessgebai) is a historic building located in Luxembourg City, Luxembourg.

== History ==
The building, designed by architect Jean-Pierre Koenig, was built to house the Luxembourgish bank Spuerkeess. The building was inaugurated on November 15, 1913, without an official ceremony, three years after construction began.

== Description ==
The building, located on Place de Metz near the Adolphe Bridge in the Gare district of Luxembourg City, features a French-inspired Neo-Renaissance style with Art Nouveau elements. Its most prominent feature is its clock tower, which has a polygonal shape and stands 46 meters high.

The main entrance is flanked by two sculptures by Jean Mich. On the left is Mercury, the Roman god of commerce, dressed in a short tunic and cloak, holding a cornucopia in one hand and a scroll in the other. To the right of the entrance is the goddess Fortuna, dressed in a long robe and cloak, holding a full purse and a scroll in her hands.

== Gallery ==
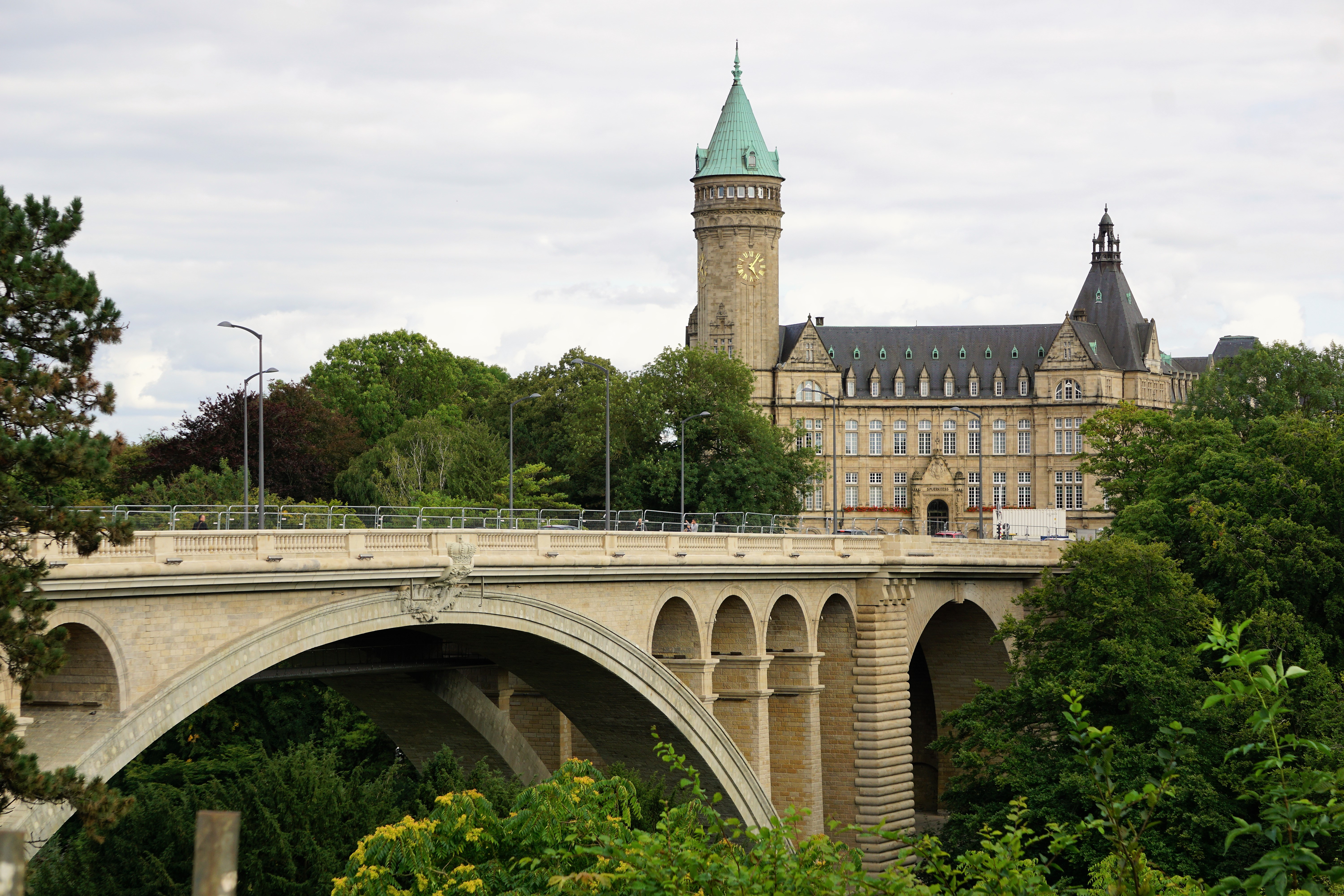

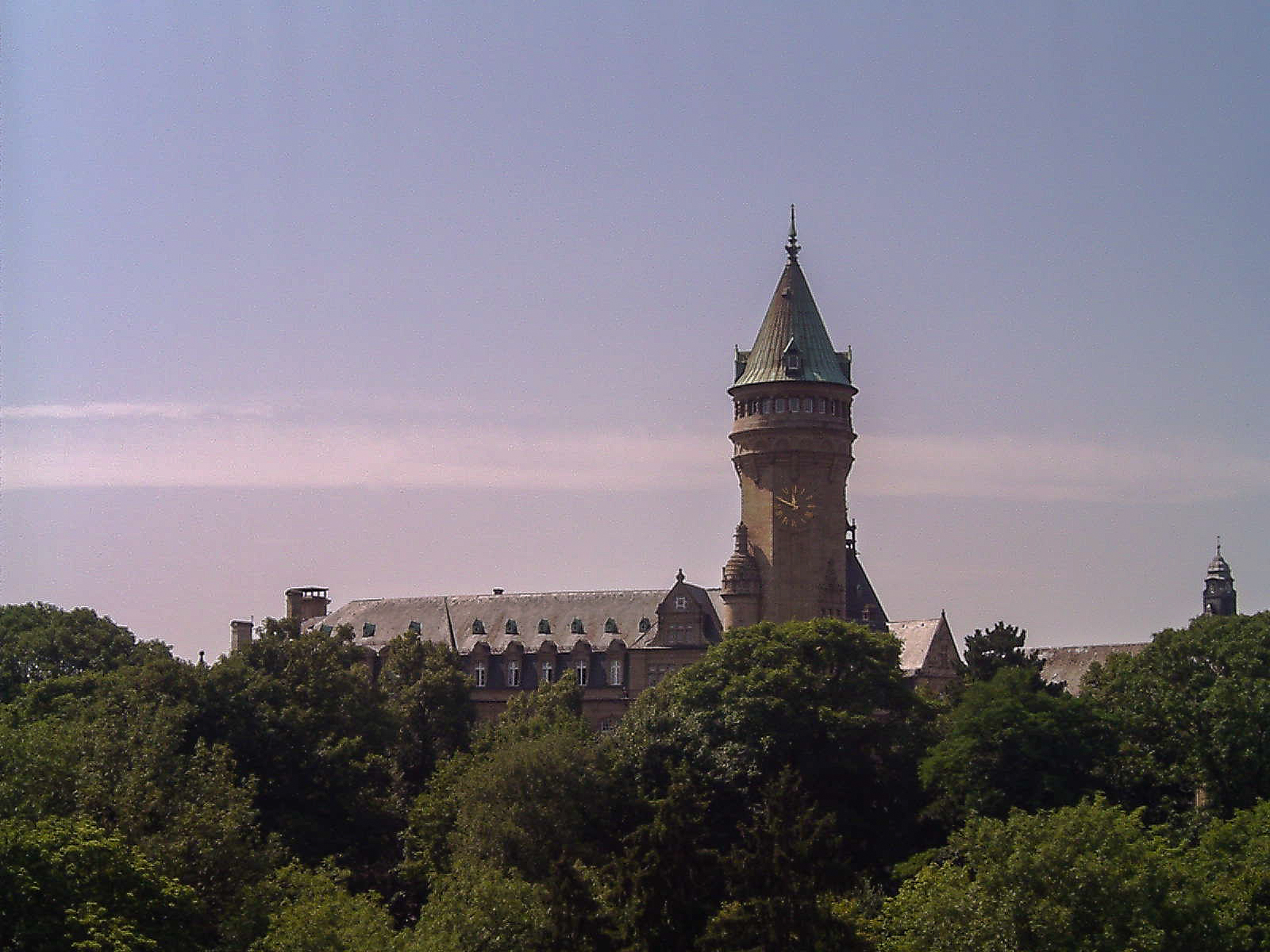

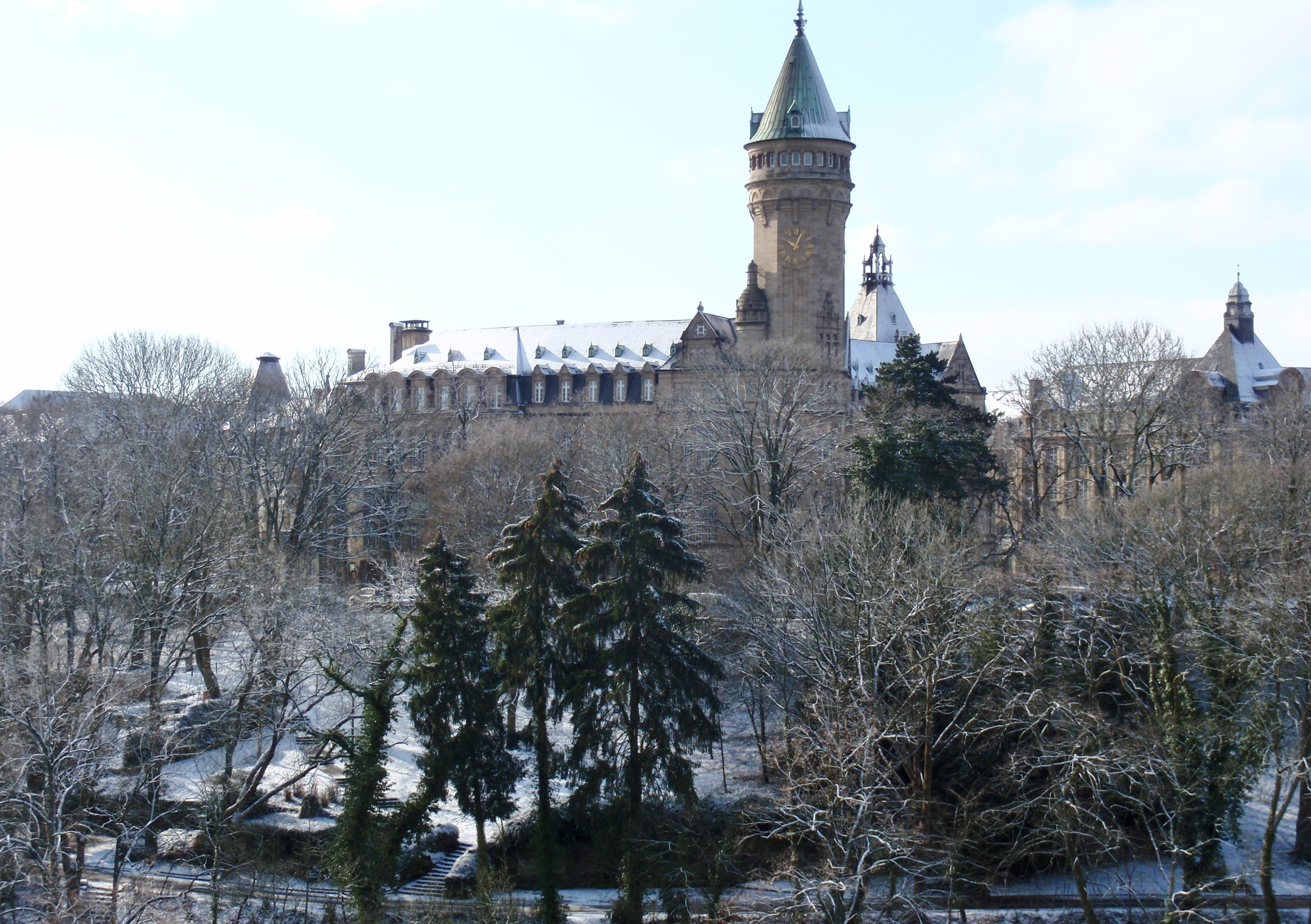
