= Boulevard Royal =

Street in Luxembourg City

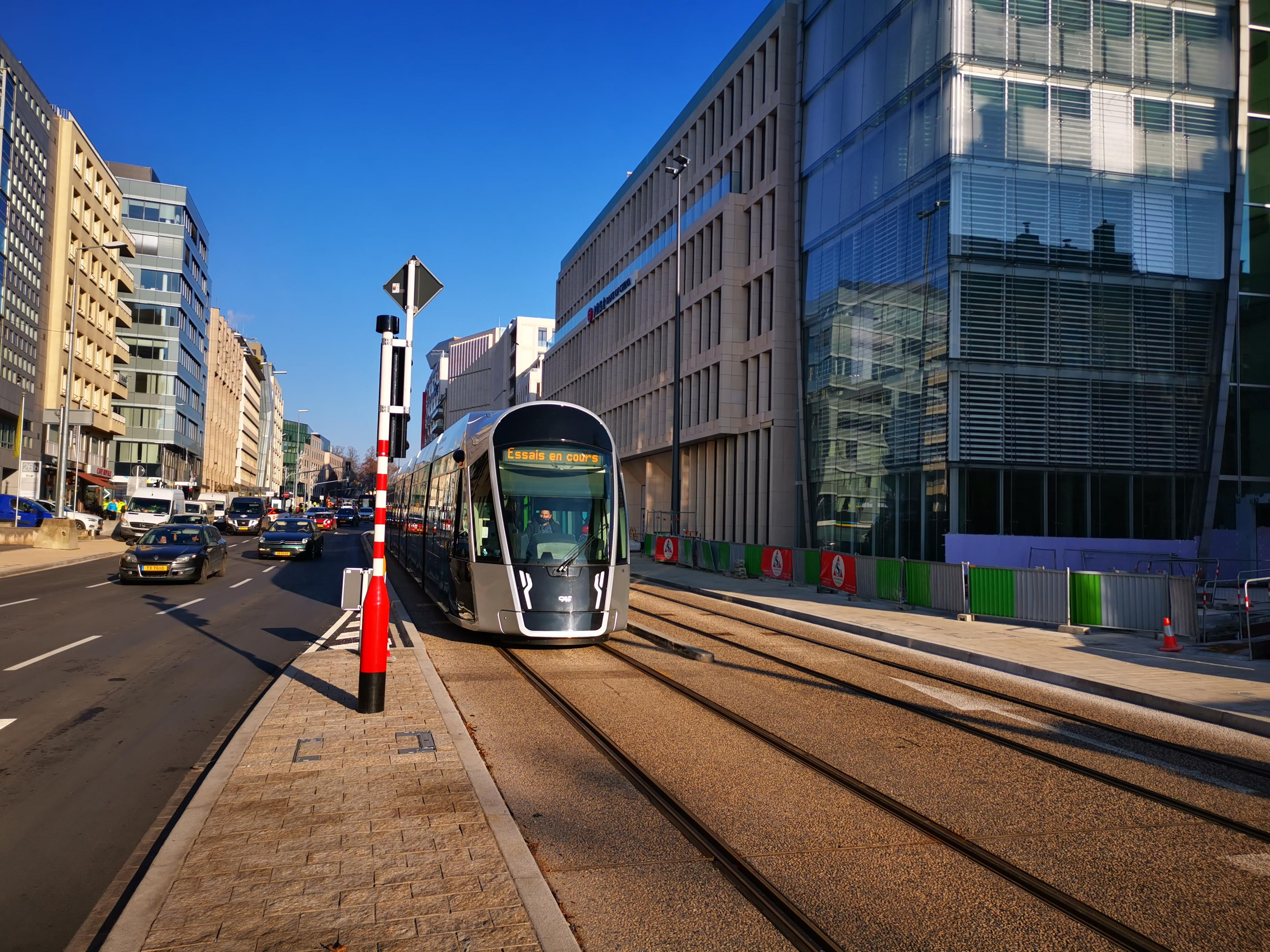

Boulevard Royal (French pronunciation: [bulvaʁ ʁwajal], "Royal Boulevard") is a street in Luxembourg City, in southern Luxembourg. The boulevard is a one-way arterial road that runs around the northern and western parts of the city centre, Ville Haute. Besides its importance as one of Luxembourg City's primary arteries, it is also the home of much of Luxembourg's large financial services industry, including the Banque Centrale du Luxembourg (No.2), Banque de Luxembourg (No.14), and Quintet Private Bank (No.43).

== Route ==
Boulevard Royal's route runs from the Côte d'Eich, in the north-east of Ville Haute, west-south-westwards for approximately 330 metres (1,000 ft), before taking a hard southward turn, whereupon it continues for 400 metres (1,200 ft). At the street's southern end, in the south-west corner of Ville Haute, it leads to the Adolphe Bridge, which takes road traffic across the Pétrusse to join Avenue de la Liberté.
