= ARBED building =

Coordinates: 49°36′20″N 6°07′47″E

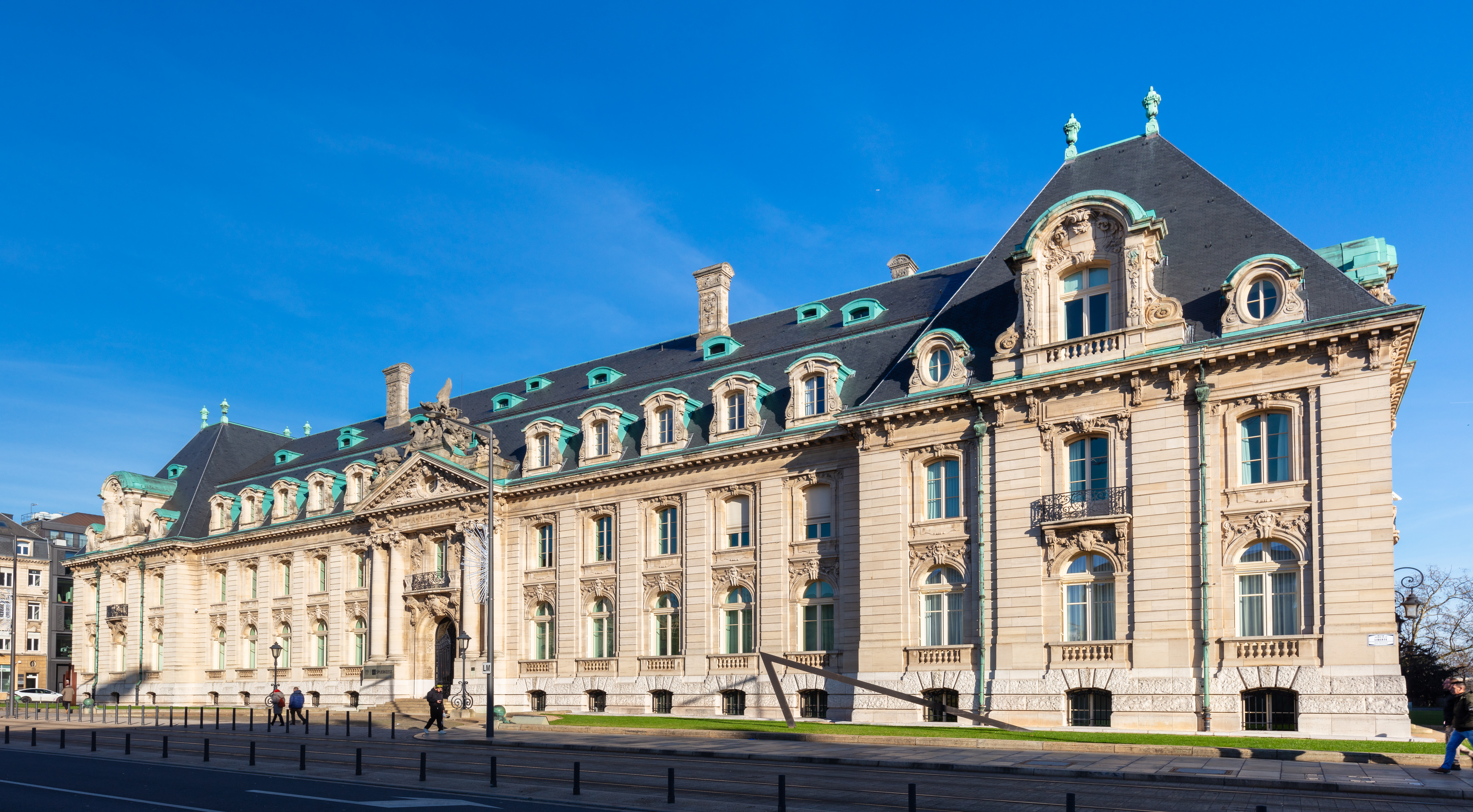
The ARBED building in 2023

The ARBED building is the generally used name for the former headquarters of ArcelorMittal and one of its predecessors, the ARBED steel manufacturing company, which was completed in 1922 on the Avenue de la Liberté, opposite the Rose Garden in Luxembourg City. The architect was the Frenchman René Théry, and construction was overseen by Sosthène Weis.

== Description ==
The building stands on a plot of 59,37 acres, and contains 15,000 square-metres of usable space. When the building was opened, it also included salons, smoking rooms, conference rooms, a restaurant, a library, a ceremonial hall, a bowling lane and a gym. Its style is inspired by French châteaux of the 17th and 18th centuries. It was built of steel and reinforced concrete, but the façade is made of sandstone. Over the main entrance is a sculpture by René Rozet, which shows Victoria crowning Mercury, in the presence of an allegorical sculpture representing science. At their feet are coins and a cog, which symbolise the economic success of industry. Next to them are putti carrying a globe made of copper, a reference to the world-wide activity of business. Some sculptures on the façade are by Duilio Donzelli.

== History ==
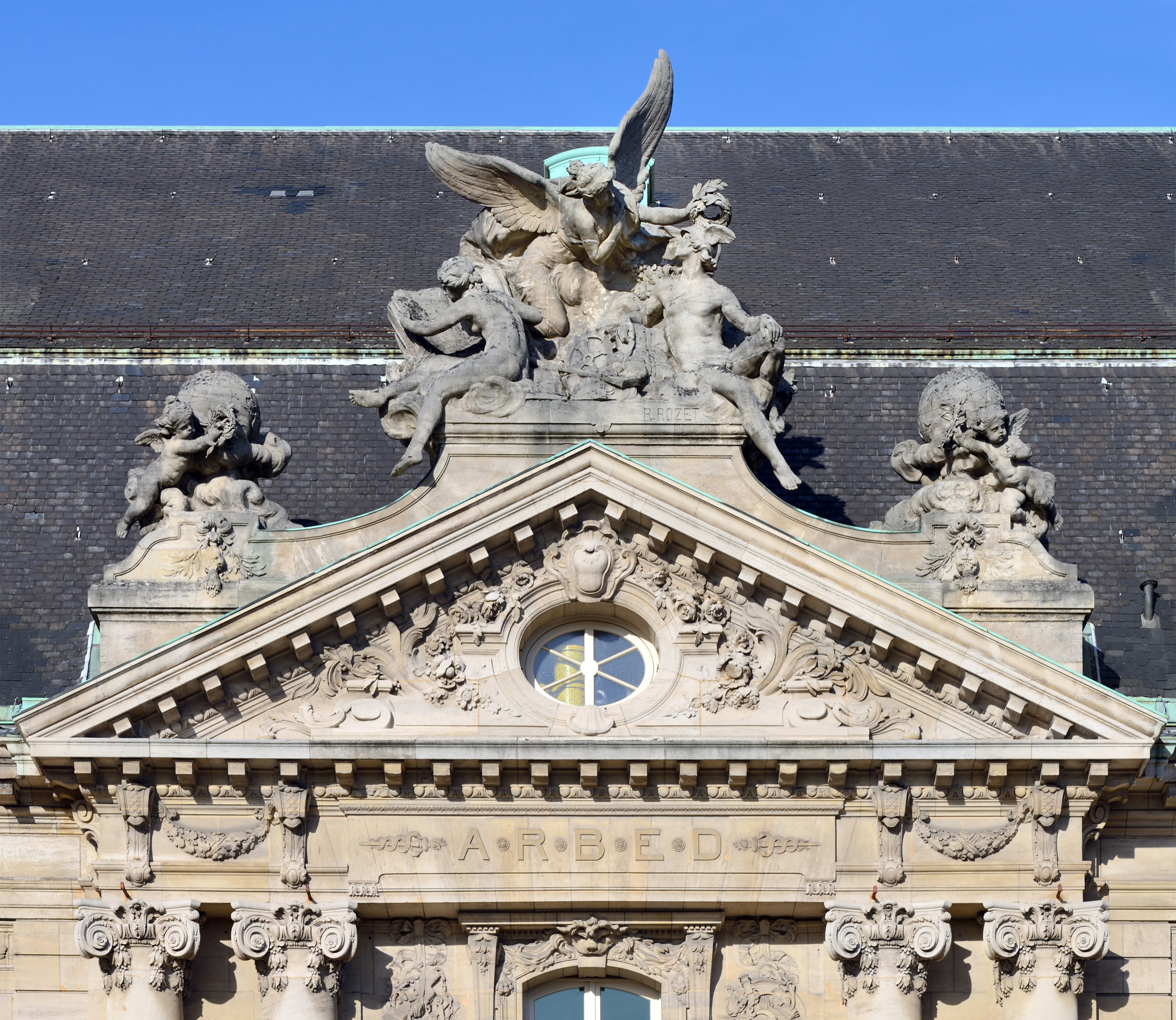

After ARBED emerged from World War I in a strong position, having bought some of the steel plants that Gelsenkirchener Hütten A.G. was forced to sell due to the German defeat, it quickly decided to build a new, grand HQ for their central administration. Its staff picked a spot in the railway quarter, along the axis between the Adolphe Bridge and the railway station. The French architect René Théry designed the building, and Sosthène Weis oversaw construction. After Théry's death in 1922, Weis continued work alone. It was inaugurated on 9 December 1922.

In 2002, ARBED merged with other European steel companies to form Arcelor, which in turn merged with Mittal Steel in 2006 to form ArcelorMittal, and the building changed ownership accordingly. ArcelorMittal no longer used the building as its headquarters, but used it for training. In November 2012 ArcelorMittal announced that it would not use the building from 2013, due to the high maintenance costs. A procedure was then started to have the building registered as a national monument. The city council consented to this on 28 January 2013, and registration was complete on 4 April 2013.

Though some members of the Chamber of Deputies expressed concern over the fate of the iconic building, suggesting it could house a public cultural institution in future, the government declared on 20 April 2013 it had no intention of purchasing the building, citing the state's financial constraints.

For a while, the building's future was in doubt. Various politicians had called for it to be turned into a cultural venue, such as a library or museum. There was also speculation that it might become a hotel, or a mixed-use space with offices, restaurants and boutiques. However, in 2014 the bank Banque et Caisse d'Épargne de l'État (BCEE) purchased the site. After 18 months of refurbishment, the building had a grand re-opening in July 2016. The BCEE moved various parts of its business to the site, including its marketing, private banking and branch management departments. One media commentator opined: "Much like Luxembourg’s economy moved from steel to finance, so has this iconic building transitioned."
