= Place des Martyrs, Luxembourg =

Garden square in Luxembourg City, Luxembourg

Coordinates: 49°36′19″N 06°07′44″E

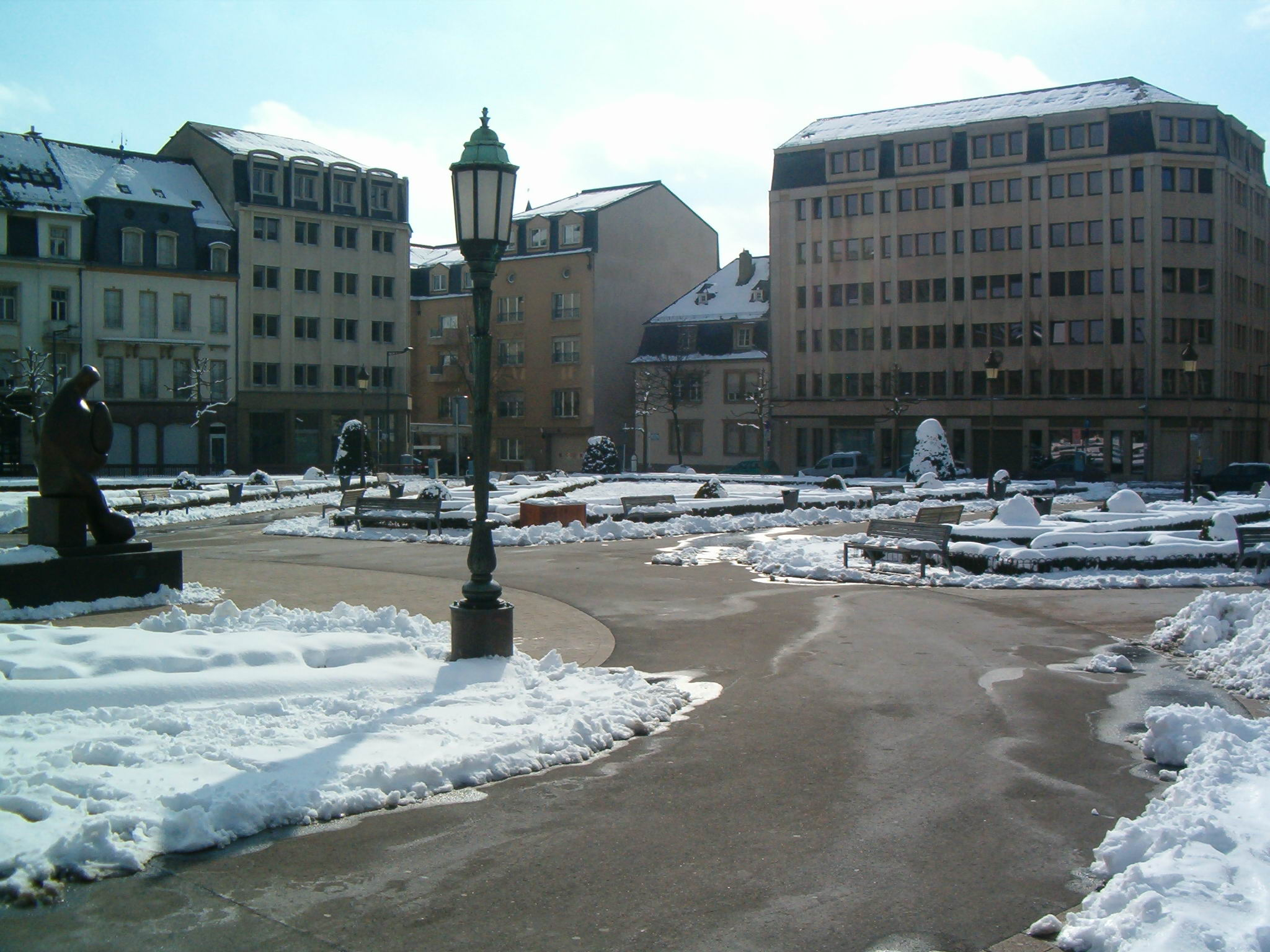
Place des Martyrs in winter

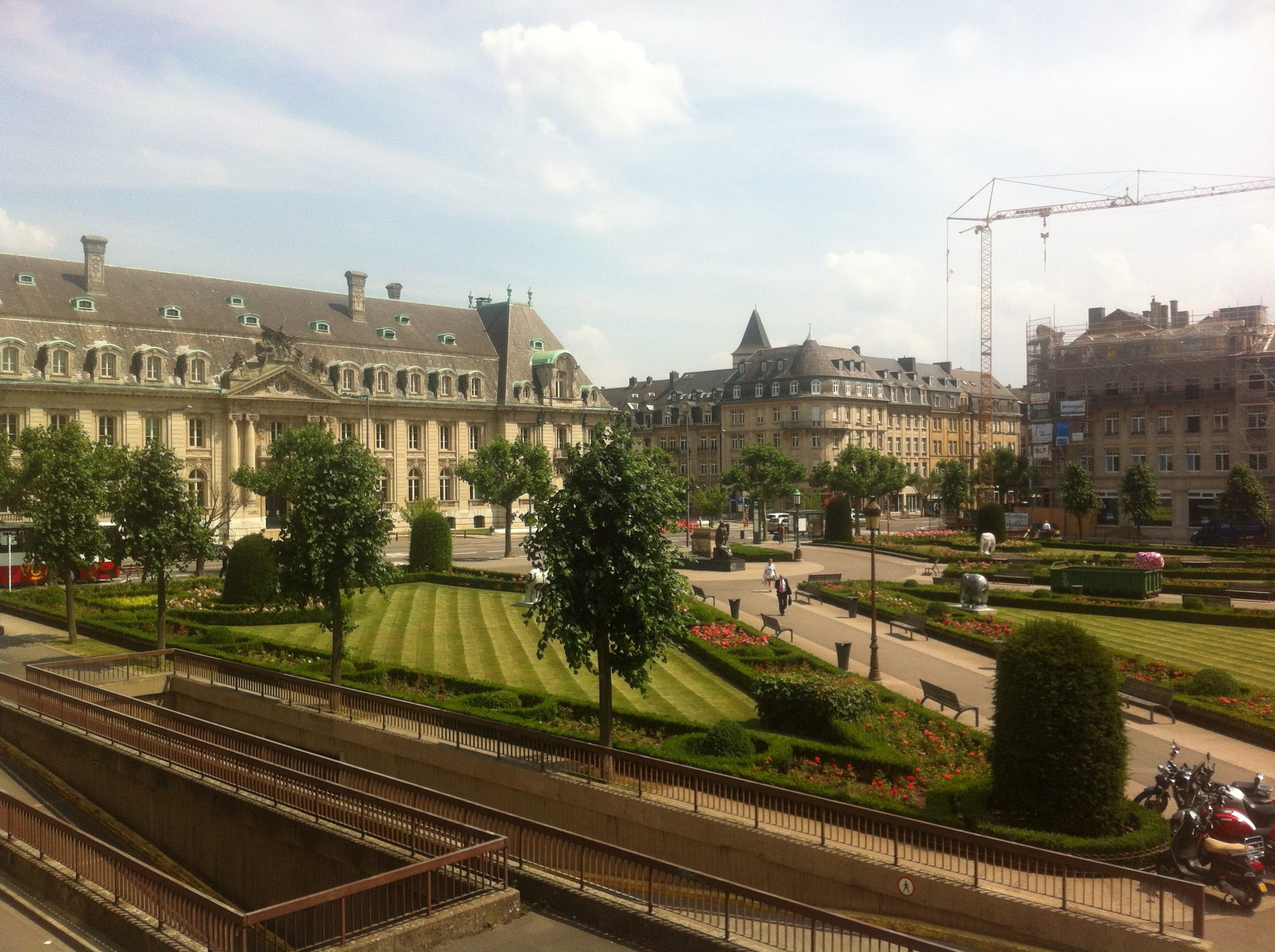
Place des Martyrs, Luxembourg

The Place des Martyrs is a garden square in Luxembourg City, in southern Luxembourg. The square lies to the south of the Pétrusse valley, in the district of Gare. It is colloquially known as the Rose Garden (Luxembourgish: Rousegäertchen), on account of the red roses that dominate the garden's floriculture.

Along its north-eastern side runs the Avenue de la Liberté, one of Luxembourg City's main thoroughfares. To the south-west runs the Rue Sainte-Zithe, whilst the Rue du Plébiscite and the Rue de la Grève make up the south-east and north-west sides of the square respectively. The former headquarters of ArcelorMittal, the world's largest steelmaker, were located on the Place des Martyrs, across the Avenue de la Liberté.

The square was laid out in the 1920s, after the German occupation of the First World War. Three radial paths run through the square, meeting at a point in front of the Arcelor headquarters, where a work by the British sculptor Henry Moore, depicting a mother and child, provides a focus.
