= Sosthène Weis =

Luxembourgish painter and architect (1872–1941)

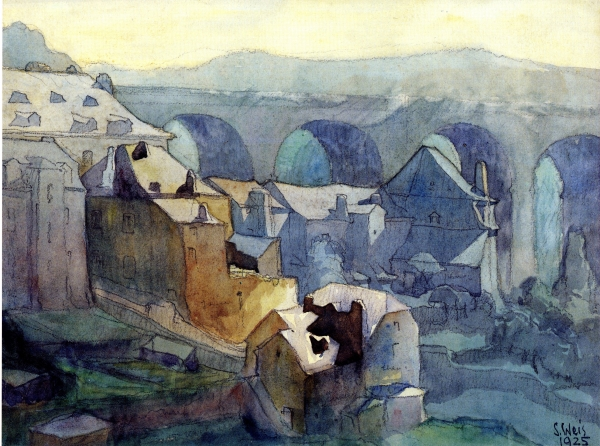
Sosthène Weis: Vue vers les maisons de la rue Vauban et le Viaduc (1925)

Sosthène Weis (29 January 1872 – 28 July 1941) was a Luxembourgish artist and architect who painted over 5,000 watercolors, mostly of Luxembourg City and its surroundings.

== Early life ==
Weis was born in Niedermertzig near Ettelbruck on 29 January, 1872. He was the son of François Weis, a tanner and sawyer. After completing high school at the Athénée in Luxembourg City where Michel Engels first introduced him to graphic art, Weis studied civil engineering from 1891 at the Polytechnic in Aachen and then at the Technical University in Munich.

== Architectural work ==
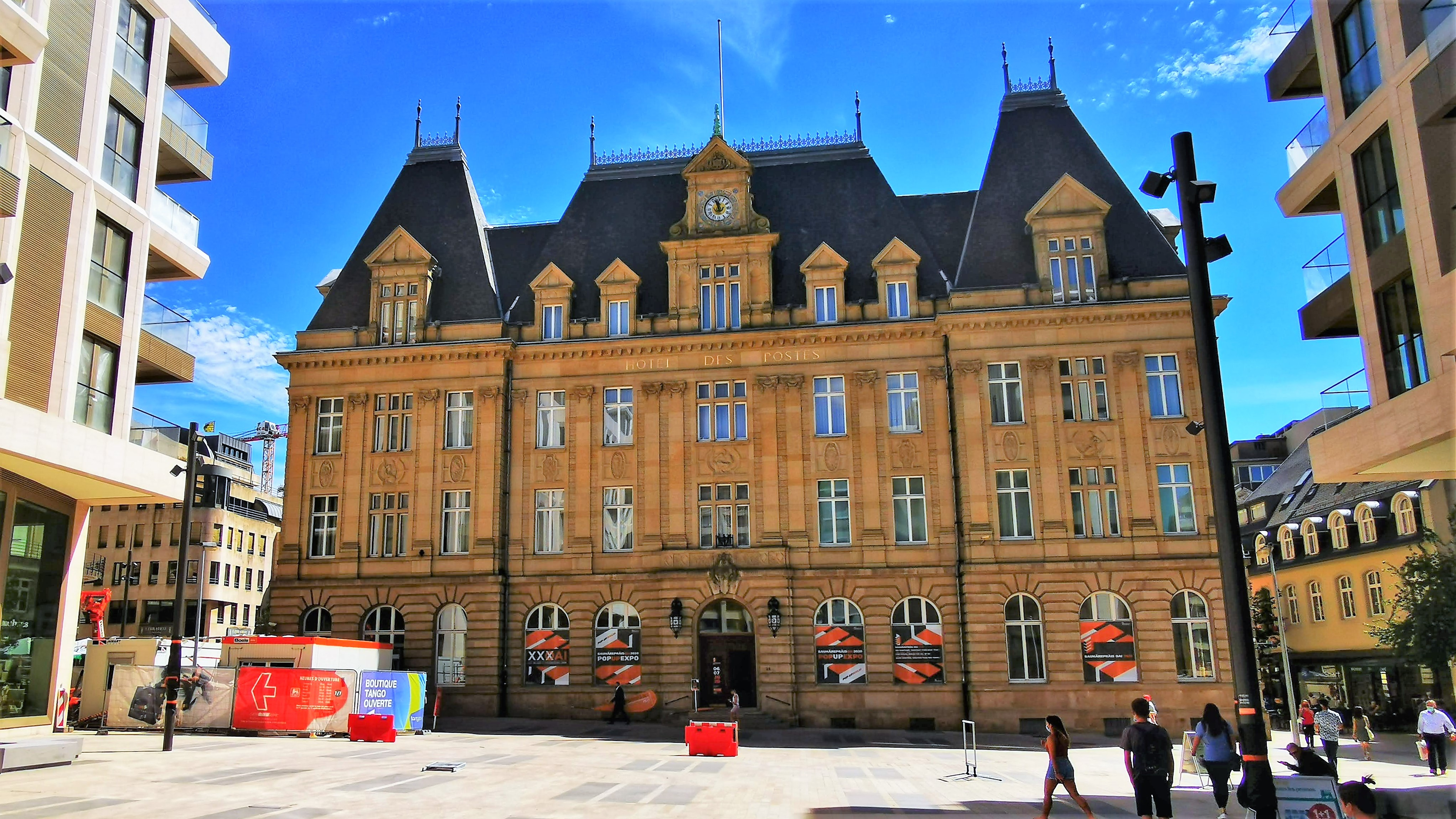
The Hôtel des Postes

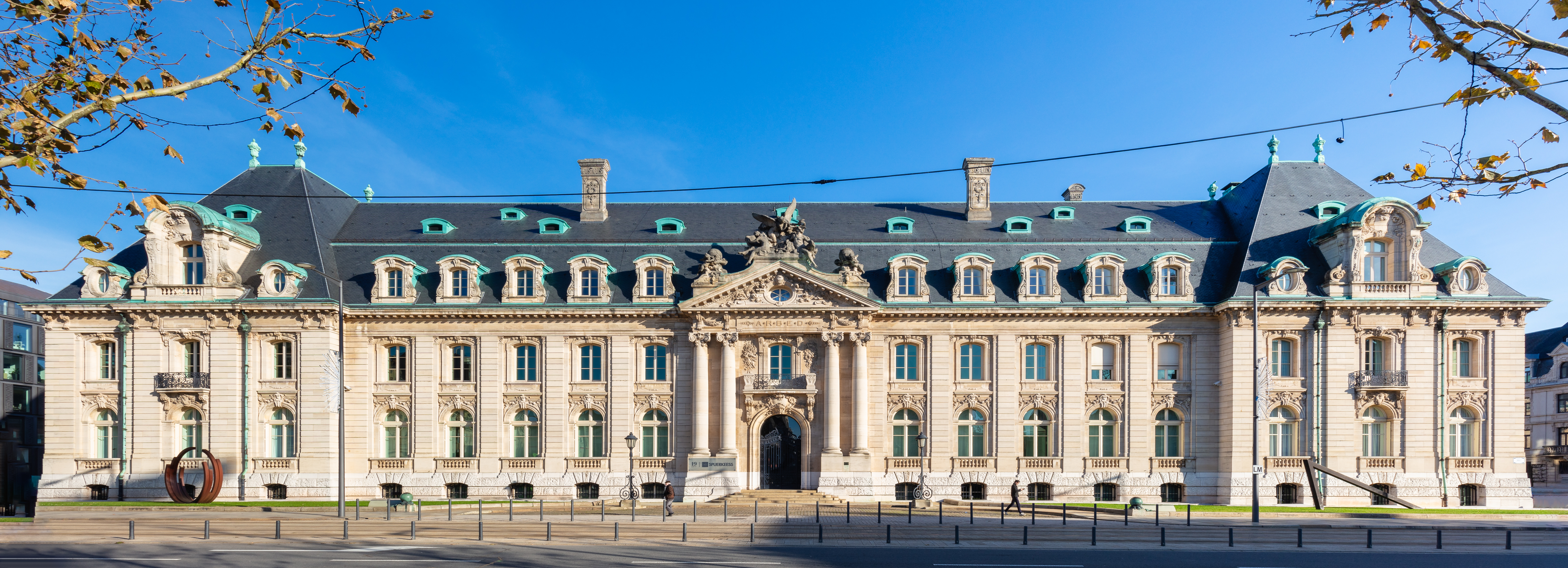
The ARBED building

After his studies, he first worked for a few years for the renowned Munich architect Hans Grässel. After returning to Luxembourg, in 1902 he married Marie Pütz with whom he had three children. The same year, the government charged him to conduct a study in connection with the Maison de Santé in Ettelbruck.

In 1904, he designed the Benedictine Convent in Peppange. In 1905, he succeeded Prosper Biwer as government architect and in 1917, he became chief architect for the ARBED steel company. There, together with René Théry from Brussels, he supervised the construction of the new company headquarters in Luxembourg City, as well as housing for the employees and workers. Among his most important works are the Hôtel des Postes, which was Luxembourg City's main post office until 2017, the Lycée technique des arts et métiers in Limpertsberg, extensions to the spa facilities at Mondorf-les-Bains, and the ARBED building.

== Painting ==
Weis exhibited interest in art from a young age, decorating his letters with floral designs. When he was abroad, he followed art courses and studied watercolor painters, especially William Turner. He became fond of watercolor painting, taking his brush and paints wherever he went. In Luxembourg City, he often visited the Pétrusse or the Alzette valleys, or the suburbs, to find interesting scenes to paint. He often returned to paint the same location when the light had changed, sometimes years later. While most of his pictures are of the City of Luxembourg and its surroundings, Weis travelled across Luxembourg, painting scenes from the Moselle, the mining towns to the south and the mountains to the north. Additionally, he painted scenes in the countries bordering Luxembourg and, during his travels, in Turkey, Tunisia, Greece, and Yugoslavia.

His earlier paintings, up to 1900, show the influence of his architectural interests, as buildings are depicted with accurate precision. Thereafter, his own romantic post-impressionist style begins to emerge, especially after 1915. Warm colors predominate with an abundance of violets, blues and ochres. As the time passed, Weis concentrated on the essentials and painted less precise and more suggestive paintings. He would rapidly draw the main lines of his scenes, then apply washes of colour with breadth and freedom.
