= Adolphe Bridge =

Double-decked arch bridge in Luxembourg City

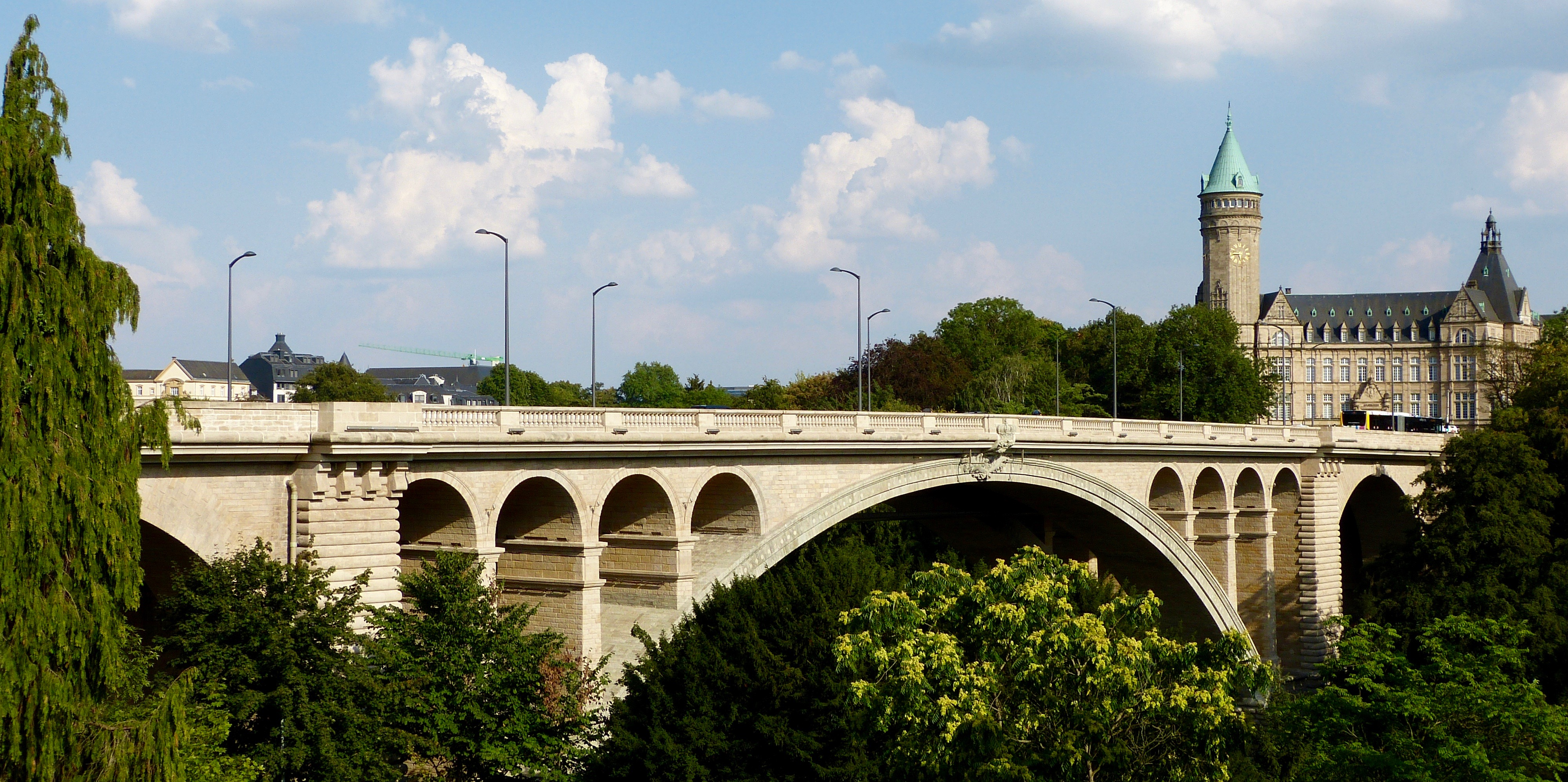
- View of the Adolphe Bridge with the Spuerkeess Building in the background
- Coordinates: 49.6083°N 6.1270°E
- Carries: Trams, road traffic and pedestrians (upper deck); Pedestrians and bicycles (lower deck)
- Crosses: Pétrusse river
- Locale: Luxembourg City
- Official name: Pont Adolphe
- Named for: Grand Duke Adolphe
- Maintained by: Administration des ponts et chaussées

Characteristics
- Design: Open spandrel deck arch bridge with suspended lower-deck
- Total length: 153 metres (502 ft)
- Width: 17.20 metres (56.4 ft)
- Longest span: 84.65 metres (277.7 ft)
- Clearance below: 42 metres (138 ft)

History
- Construction start: 14 July 1900
- Construction end: 24 July 1903
- Opened: 24 July 1903

Location
- Interactive map of Adolphe Bridge

The Adolphe Bridge (Luxembourgish: Adolphe-Bréck, French: Pont Adolphe, German: Adolphe-Brücke) is a double-decked arch bridge in Luxembourg City, in southern Luxembourg. The bridge provides a one-way route for road traffic across the Pétrusse, from Boulevard Royal, in Ville Haute, to Avenue de la Liberté, on the Bourbon Plateau in Gare. Its upper deck is 153 m (502 ft) in length and carries two lanes of road traffic, and two pedestrian footpaths. Its lower deck, opened in 2018, suspended beneath the upper deck, is 154 m (505 ft) in length, and carries a dedicated bidirectional bicycle path, with access provided for pedestrian use. As of 13 December 2020, following the completion of the second phase of the construction of the city's new tramline, the bridge carries bidirectional tram traffic on its upper deck.

The Adolphe Bridge has become an unofficial national symbol of sorts, representing Luxembourg's independence, and has become one of Luxembourg City's main tourist attractions. The bridge was designed by Paul Séjourné, a Frenchman, and Albert Rodange, a Luxembourger, and was built between 1900 and 1903. Its design was copied in the construction of Walnut Lane Bridge in Philadelphia, the United States.

The bridge was named after Grand Duke Adolphe, who reigned Luxembourg from 1890 until 1905, and was the first monarch to hold the title not in personal union with another. Although it is now over 100 years old, it is also known as the New Bridge (Luxembourgish: Nei Bréck, French: Nouveau pont, German: Neue Brücke) by people from Luxembourg City. The 'old bridge' in this comparison is the Passerelle, which was built between 1859 and 1861.

== History ==
=== Beginnings ===
With the demolition of the city's famous fortification, the 1867 Treaty of London, and the decline of its strategic importance, Luxembourg City reverted to the normality enjoyed by other cities. The city's built-up area spread southwards from Haute Ville, over the Pétrusse, where Luxembourg City's railway station was already located. However, the only existing link to the south bank of the Pétrusse was the old viaduct, which (at 5.50 m wide) was too narrow to accommodate all the traffic that would be expected between two halves of the city.

In 1896, the government hired Albert Rodange to draw up plans for a new bridge. Rodange identified the future bridge's position, connecting with the main axis of Boulevard Royal, and drew up initial plans for a large stone viaduct. However, as Rodange lacked experience in bridge building, the government invited a foreigner with specific expertise in the field to help design the bridge. Paul Séjourné, a Frenchman with years of experience designing similar viaducts in southern France, was chosen.

=== Design ===
Although Séjourné concurred with Rodange's site and basic design, he made many major modifications. Instead of several medium-sized arches, Séjourné sought to build the bridge around a large central arch, flanked by smaller arches. The plan, which was adopted, called for:

- Twin parallel 84.65 m arches in the centre, surmounted by eight smaller arches of 5.40 m each.
- Two arches of 21.60 m flanking the central arch.
- Two further arches of 6.00 m outside the medium-sized arches.

In total, the bridge would have a length of 153 m. The plans were audacious for that day and age; at 84.65 m, the central span was to be the largest stone arch in existence. The roadway was constructed of reinforced concrete, a material that had only recently come into use, the weight of which was carried on the columns of the smaller arches, thereby saving the heavy infilling used in a conventional arched bridge. The arches and columns were constructed from sandstone, quarried locally at Ernzen, Dillingen, Gilsdorf, and Verlorenkost. This design was later replicated by Séjourné in a bridge over the River Garonne at Toulon and was copied in concrete for the Walnut Lane Bridge in Philadelphia.

=== Construction ===
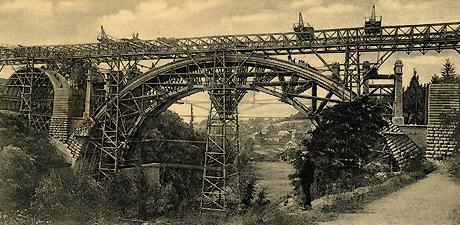
Charles Bernhoeft: Pont Adolphe under construction (1901)

The foundation stone of the bridge was laid on 14 July 1900, and it was inaugurated just over three years later, on 24 July 1903. Originally, the bridge carried both road and rail traffic; two rail/tram tracks over the bridge formed part of the railway route from Luxembourg City to Echternach, which was opened on 20 April 1904.

=== Renovations (1903-2003) ===
In its century of operations between 1903 and 2003, the bridge faced four periods of renovation. Minor changes were made in 1961 and 1976, including the removal of rail lines following the end of the first generation of trams in Luxembourg. In 1990, the Luxembourgish government launched an investigation into the state of the bridge and found that it showed signs of extensive damage, to both the stonework and steel. Between September 2003 and August 2004, the central arches were strengthened by the addition of 258 prestressed steel bars, with a total force of 25,600 tonnes (251 MN).

=== Conversion to a double-decked bridge ===
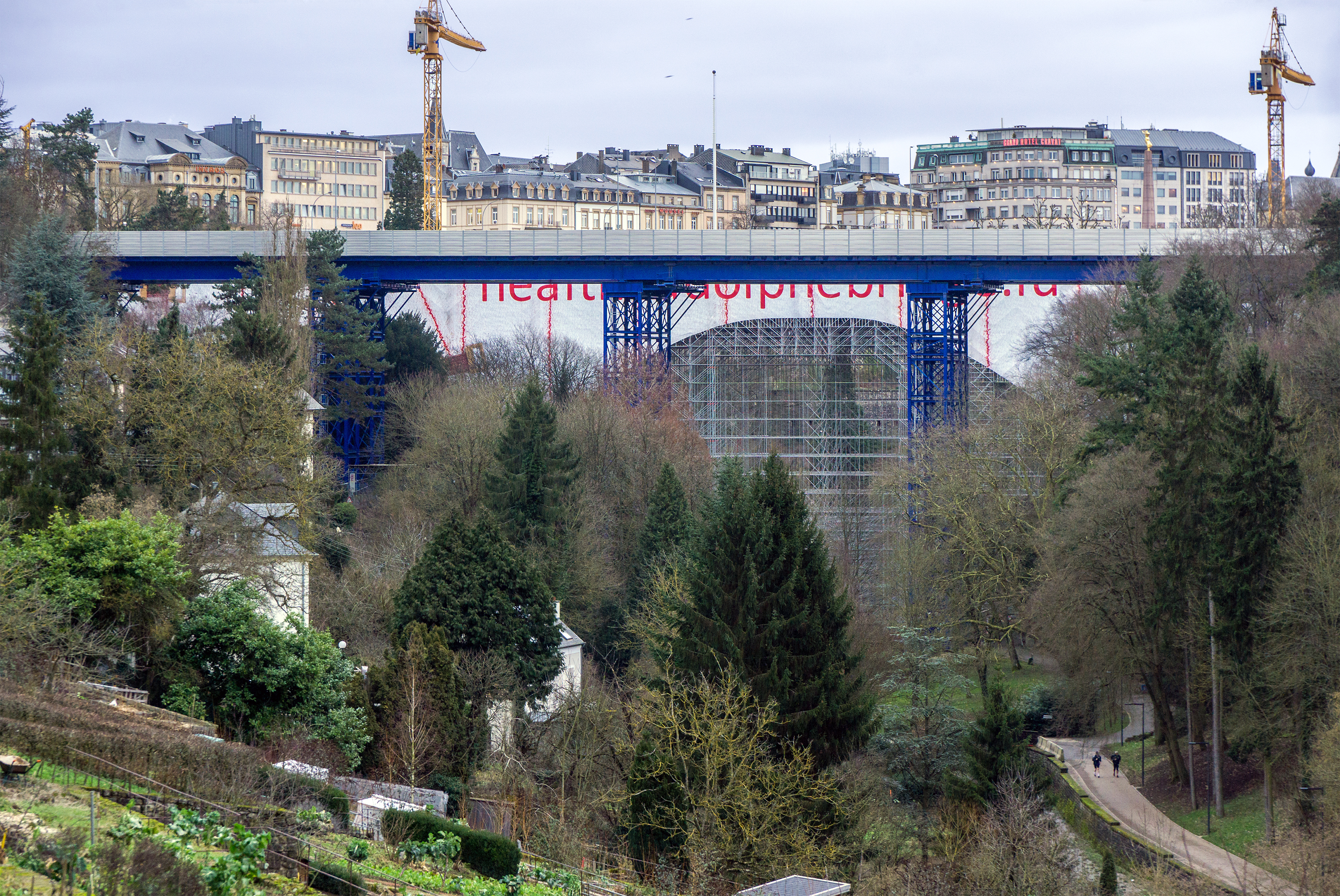
The temporary "Blue Bridge", with the Adolphe Bridge under renovation behind it

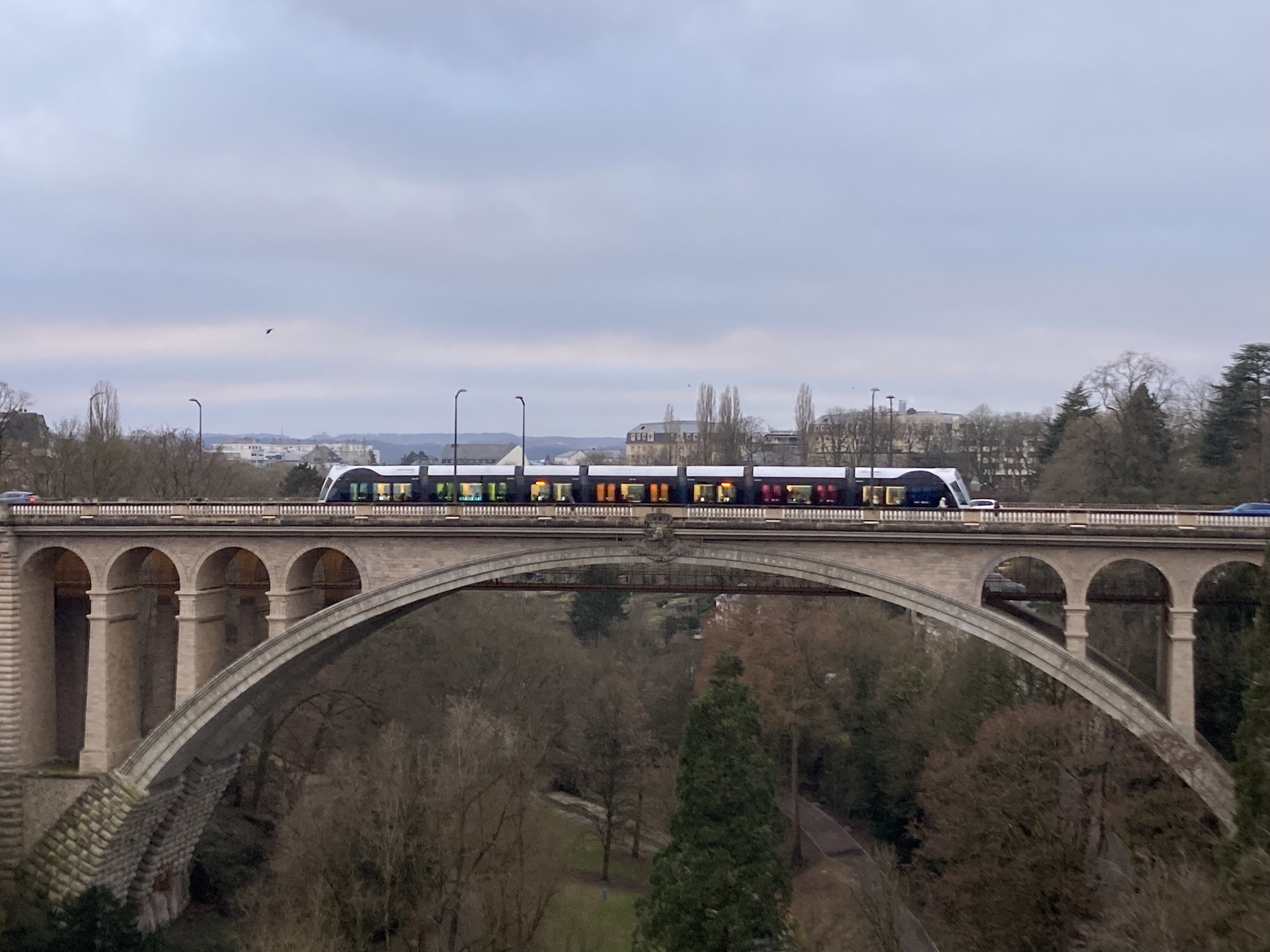
A Luxembourg City tramway passing on the bridge.

In concordance with the reintroduction of trams in Luxembourg, major redesign and renovation work occurred between 2014 and 2017, with a temporary bridge constructed parallel operating in the interim. The Adolphe Bridge was widened and reinforced to accommodate the new tramlines installed on its upper-deck. Additionally, a 154 m-long (505 ft) and 4 m-wide (13 ft) lower deck was suspended beneath the existing deck, between the arches of the bridge, to act as dedicated bidirectional bicycle path and footpath. Bicycle-friendly sloped approaches were dug on the western side of both ends of the bridge, and an additional stairwell was added on the eastern side of the Ville Haute approach.

== See also ==
- History of rail transport in Luxembourg
- Trezzo Bridge
- Construction photo gallery
