= Avenue de la Liberté =

Street in Luxembourg City, Luxembourg

Bird's eye view of Avenue de la Liberté, facing south

Avenue de la Liberté (French pronunciation: [avny də la libɛʁte], "Liberty Avenue") is a street in the Gare district of Luxembourg City, Luxembourg. In Luxembourgish language, it is usually referred to by its informal name Nei Avenue ("New Avenue", as opposed to the older Avenue de la Gare).

Following significant alterations to its layout during renovation works, which occurred between 2018 and 2021, the avenue is separated into a dedicated bidirectional two-lane tramway on its eastern-side, followed by a two-lane one-way arterial road for motor vehicle traffic heading south towards Luxembourg station, and a bidirectional dedicated cycle-path on its western-side. All this is flanked by two wide tree-lined paved pedestrian footpaths. Prior to the works, which formed part of Luxembourg City's efforts to reintroduce tram transport, the avenue was a four-lane arterial road for motor vehicles with a one way designation for all traffic, excepting public buses.

== Route ==
At its north end, the Avenue de la Liberté meets the Adolphe Bridge, which acts as a route for tram, motor vehicle, pedestrian, and bicycle traffic over the Pétrusse valley to join the Boulevard Royal in the city centre, Ville Haute.

The avenue's tramway, which forms part of the T1 line, is the location of two tram stops, "Place de Metz", and "Place de Paris/Paräiser Plaz".

One-quarter of the way down the road, it runs along the eastern side of the Place des Martyrs, opposite which was the headquarters of ArcelorMittal, the world's largest steel-manufacturer. At its south, the street reaches the city's central station, where it becomes Place de la Gare, part of the N3 road.
