= Krautmaart =

Coordinates: 49°36′38″N 06°07′57″E

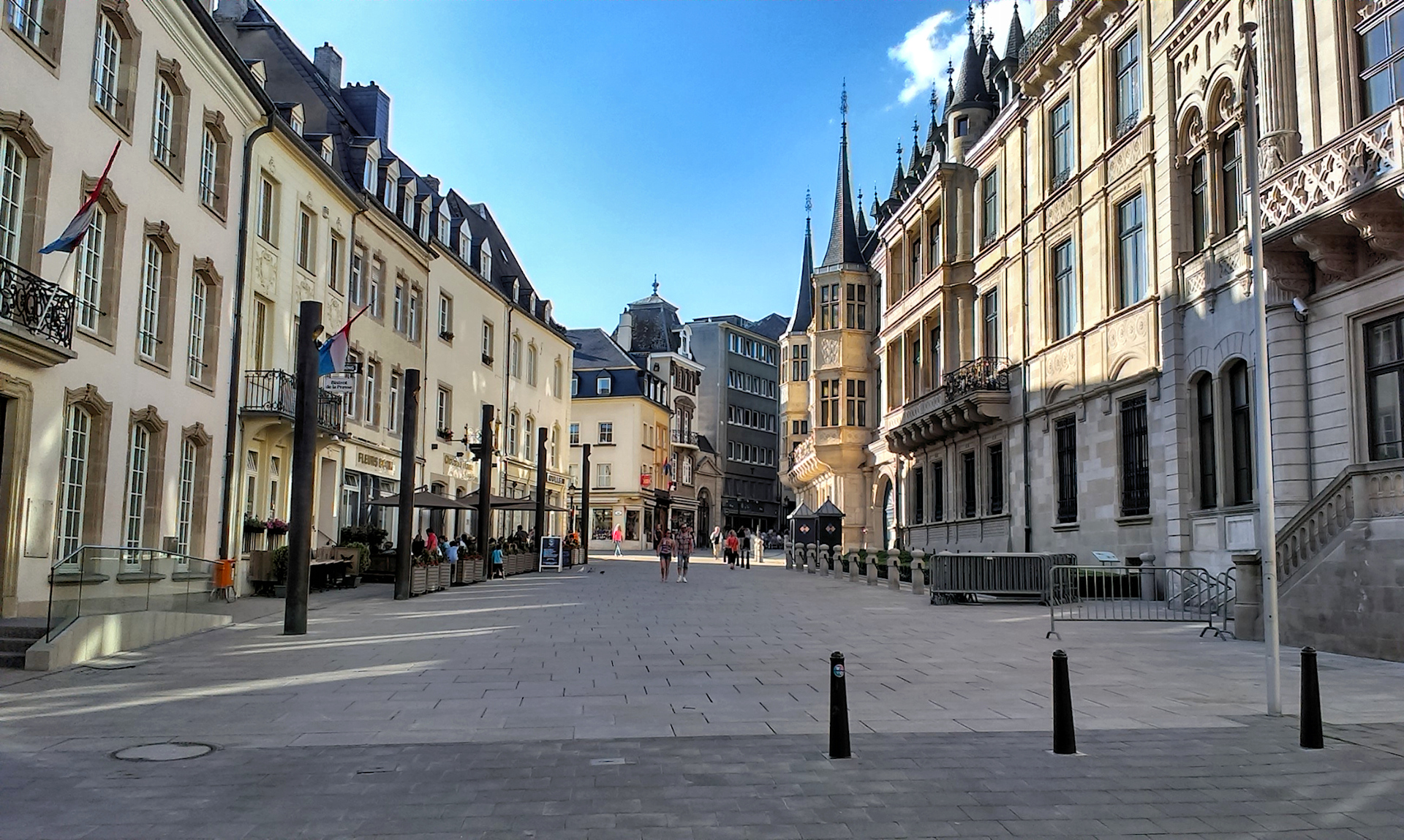
The Krautmaart in 2013

The Krautmaart (Luxembourgish), rue du Marché aux Herbes (French, pronounced [ʁy dy maʁʃe oz‿ɛʁb]), or Krautmarkt (German, pronounced [ˈkʁaʊtmaʁkt]), is an irregularly-shaped street in Luxembourg City, in southern Luxembourg. The street, whose name translates into English as Herb Market street, is situated in Ville Haute, the historic heart of the city. It lies to the east of Place Guillaume II, across the rue du Fossé.

Due to the presence of the seat of Luxembourg's Chamber of Deputies on the street, 'Krautmaart' is used as a metonym for the Luxembourgish legislature. Despite this, it is the adjoining Grand Ducal Palace that dominates Krautmaart.
