= Banque et caisse d'épargne de l'État =

Luxembourgish state-owned commercial bank

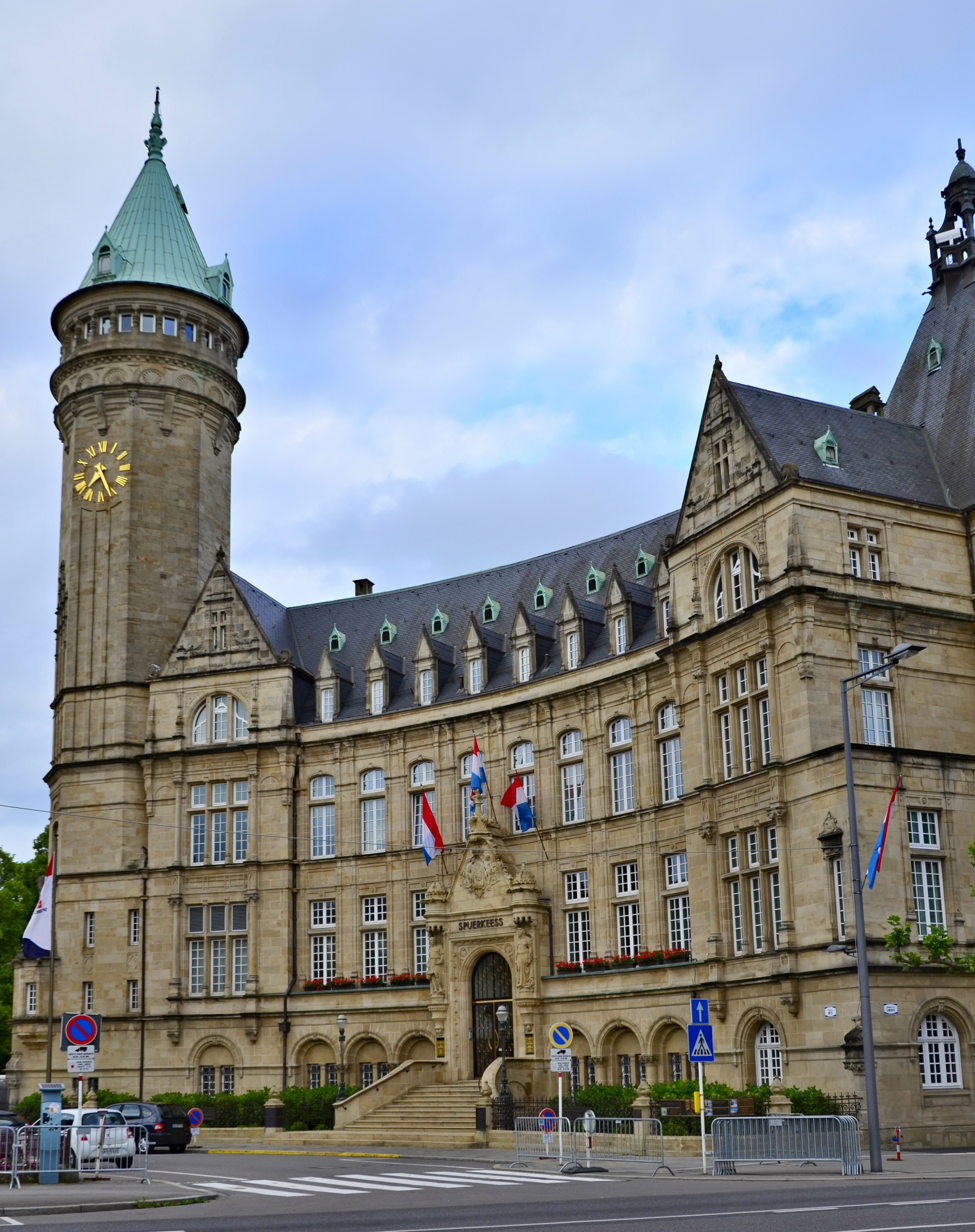
- Bank headquarters on Place de Metz, Luxembourg City
- Type: State-owned enterprise
- Industry: Banking
- Founded: 21 February 1856
- Headquarters: Luxembourg City, Luxembourg
- Area served: universal bank of Luxembourg
- Key people: Françoise Thoma (CEO, President of the Executive Committee) and Camille Fohl (Chairman of the Board)
- Operating income: €603.6 m (2019)
- Net income: €183.9 m (2019)
- Total assets: €48,063.2 m (2019)
- Number of employees: 1,840 work units (2019)
- Website: spuerkeess.lu

The Banque et caisse d'épargne de l'État (French pronunciation: [bɑ̃k e kɛs depaʁɲ də leta], State Bank and Savings Bank), also known by its Luxembourgish name Spuerkeess (lit. 'Savings Bank'), is the leading national financial institution founded in 1856 and governed by the law of 24 March 1989. Spuerkeess is a commercial bank wholly owned by the government of Luxembourg.

Nowadays, it provides all the functions of a commercial bank, including retail banking and private banking. In terms of total assets Spuerkeess is the third-largest bank in Luxembourg and the largest bank with domestic capital.

BCEE has been designated as a Significant Institution since the entry into force of European Banking Supervision in late 2014, and as a consequence is directly supervised by the European Central Bank.

== History ==
Spuerkees was founded by Grand Duke William III as "Caisse d'épargne de l'État du Grand-Duché de Luxembourg" due to a Law on 21 February 1856. The board of directors had three members and had their first meeting on 18 August 1859 under the presidency of Professor Nicolas Martha. Headquarters of the Spuerkeess at that time were seated in Haus Ketter in Dräikinneksgaass in the city, while their desk offices were at the Krautmaart, at the headquarters of the government commission, which is today's Palais.

Since its foundation in 1856, the bank has been solely owned by the Luxembourg State. The statutory missions of the Bank consist in promoting savings, facilitating access to housing and supporting the development of the national economy.

Since 1862 it was allowed that foreigners could deposit their money at the Spuerkeess. The trust of the public was high from the first day on, one of the reasons the deposit already reached an amount of one million francs in 1869.

== See also ==
- List of banks in the euro area
- List of banks in Luxembourg
