= Gare, Luxembourg City =

District of Luxembourg City, Luxembourg

Gare: Gare (French); Garer Quartier (Luxembourgish); Bahnhofsviertel (German)
- District

- Gare is one of 24 districts in Luxembourg City
- Country: Luxembourg
- Commune: Luxembourg City

Area
  - Total: 1.0526 km^{2} (0.4064 sq mi)

Population (31 December 2025)
  - Total: 11,292
  - Density: 10,728/km^{2} (27,785/sq mi)

Nationality
  - Luxembourgish: 18.41%
  - Other: 81.59%
- Website: Gare

Gare (French pronunciation: [ɡaʁ]; Luxembourgish: Garer Quartier [ˌɡaːʀɐ ˈkɑχtjeː]; German: Bahnhofsviertel [ˈbaːnhoːfsˌfɪʁtl̩]) is a district in central Luxembourg City, in southern Luxembourg. The district has, since 1859, been the location of Luxembourg's principal railway station and terminus, Luxembourg station, around which it subsequently developed. The district's name translates into English, from the French Gare, to "station".

Geographically, the district is situated on the Bourbon plateau, and is separated from the Ville Haute district, heart of Luxembourg's ancient fortifications, by a steep valley where the Pétrusse joins the Alzette river in the Grund district. The valley was first spanned by the Passerelle viaduct, opened in 1859.

Following the 1867 Treaty of London, which ordered the dismantling of Luxembourg's fortifications, the district expanded rapidly, notably with the construction of the Adolphe Bridge, opened in 1903, and connected to the station by the grand Avenue de la Liberté.

As of 31 December 2025, the district has a population of 11,292 inhabitants.

== Gallery ==
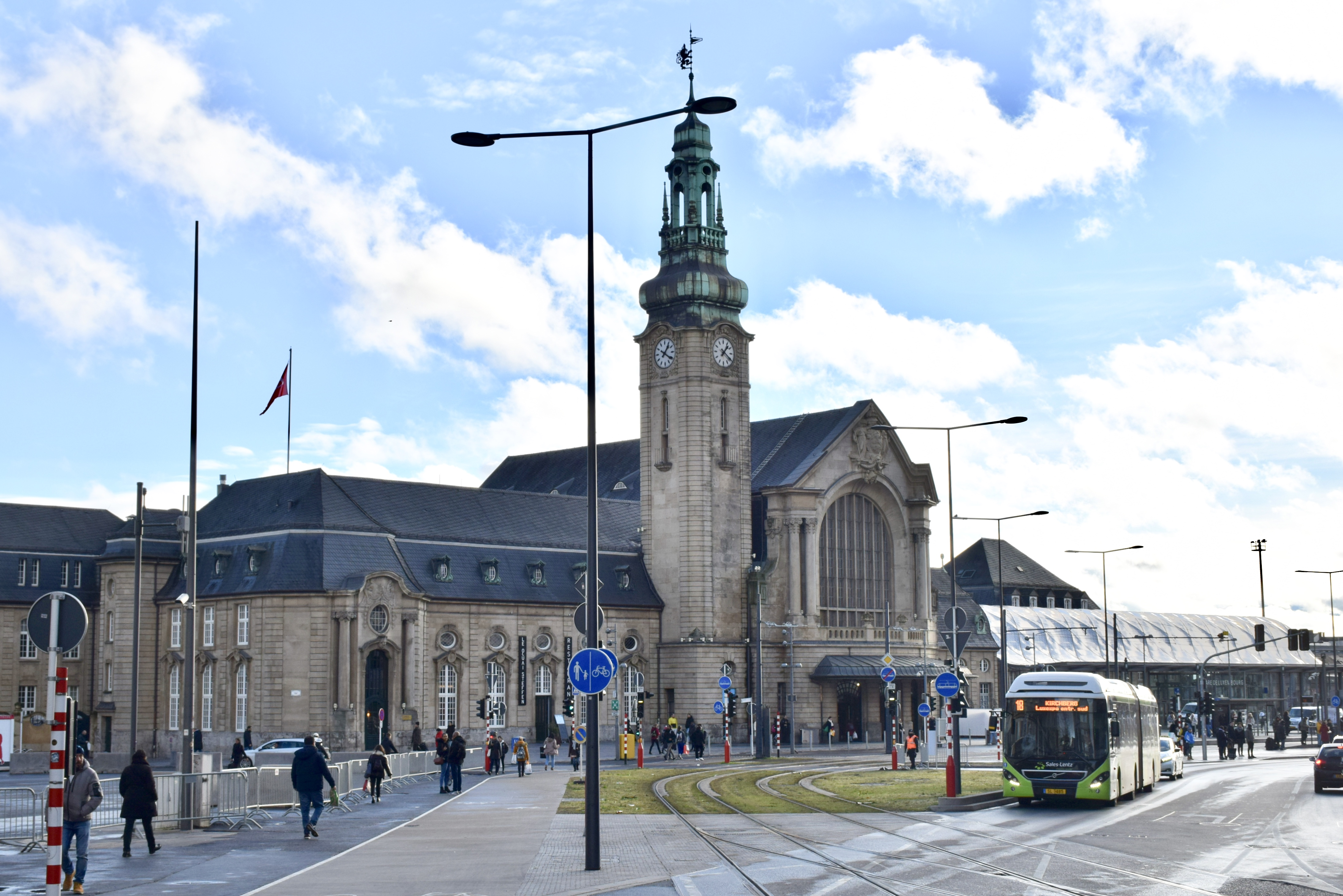
Luxembourg railway station

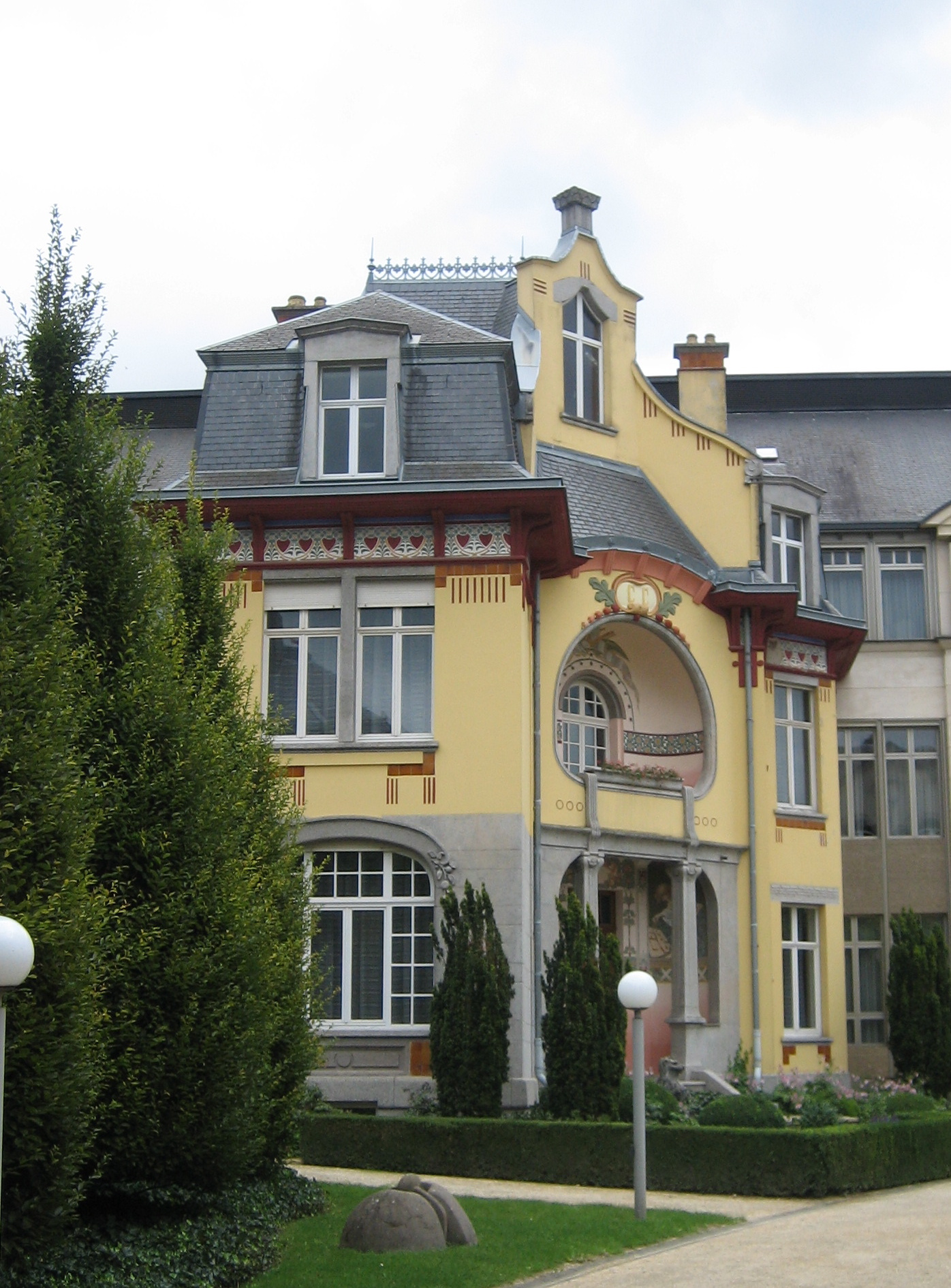
Villa Clivio

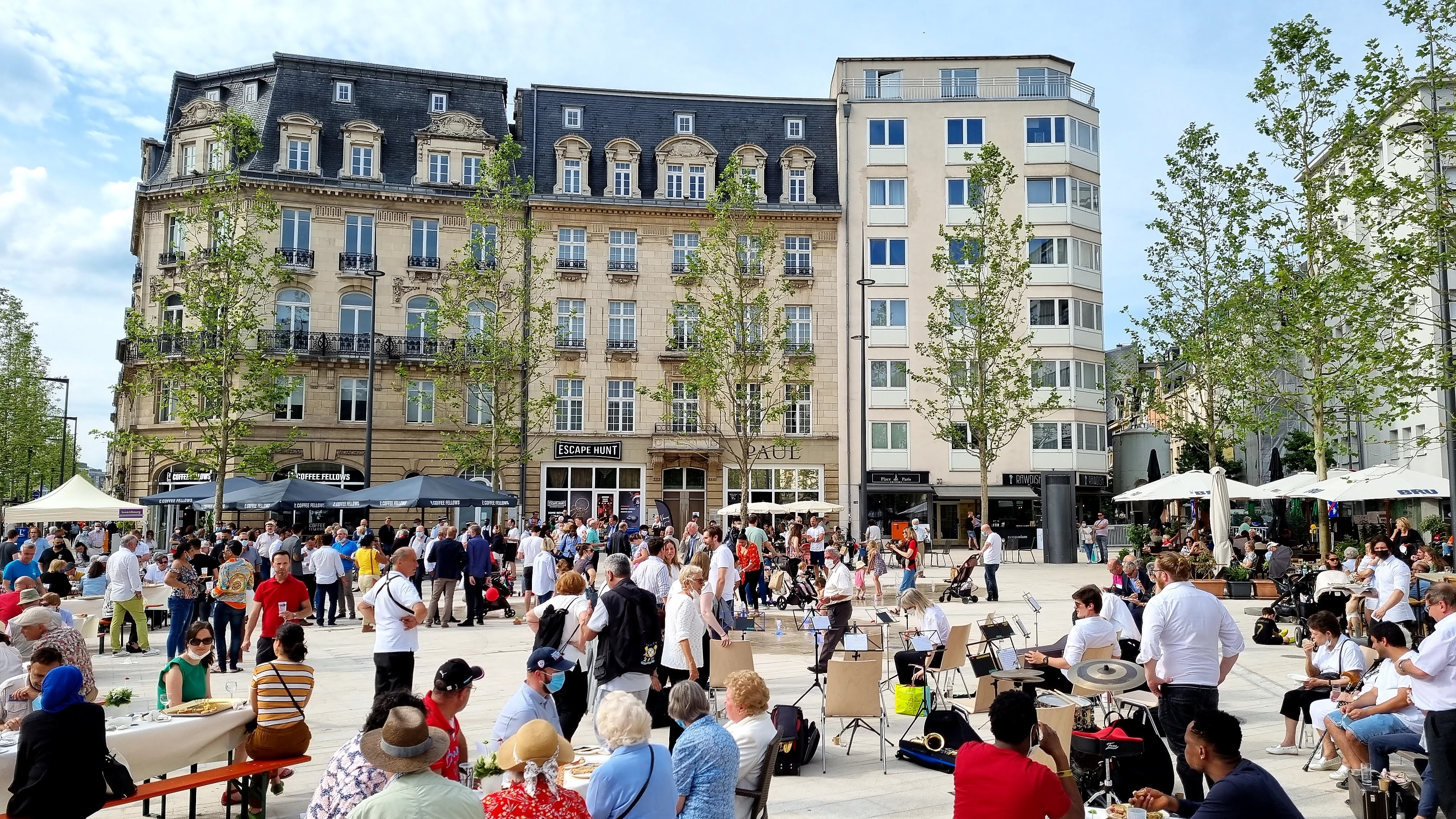
Place de Paris

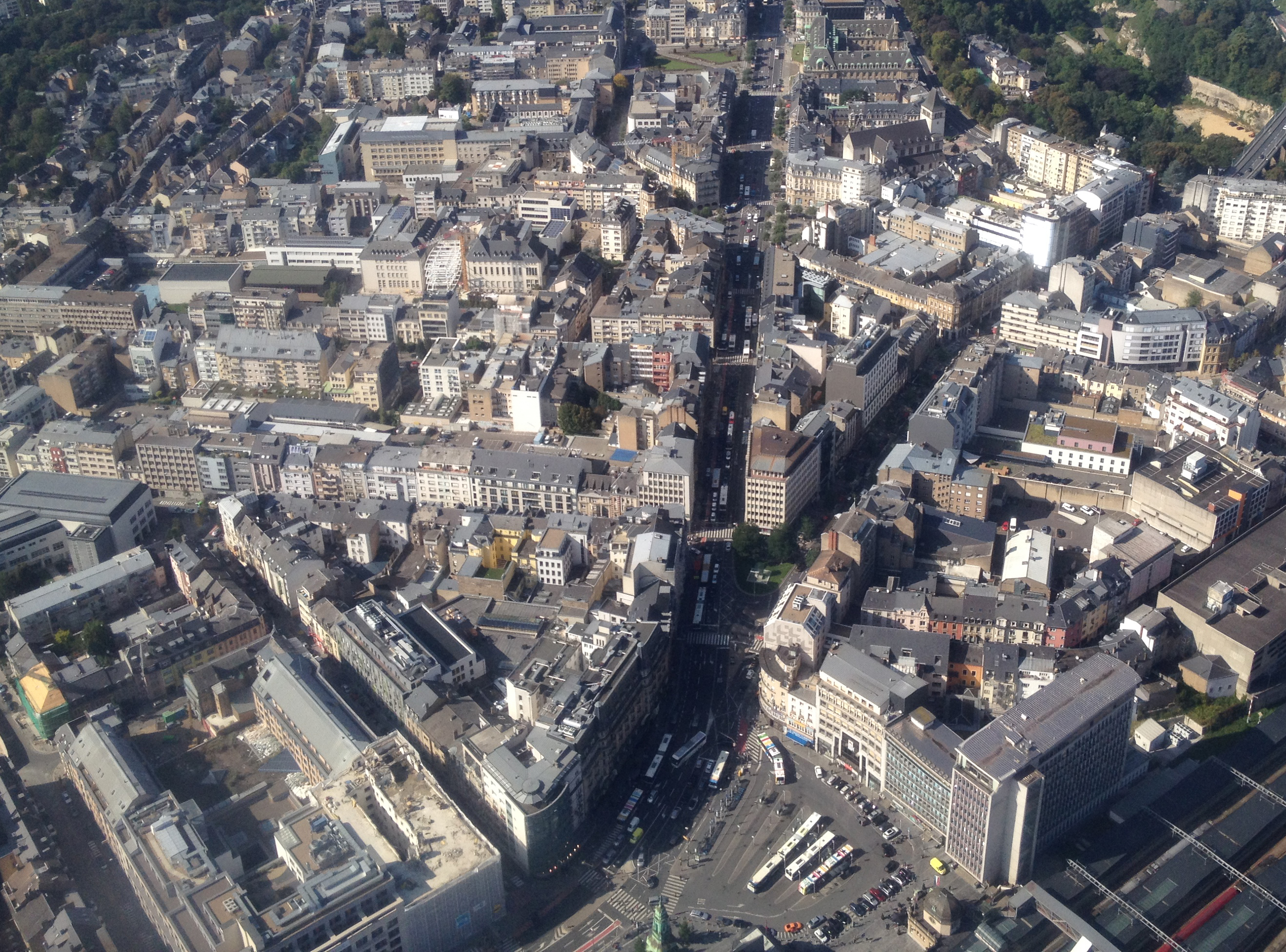
Aerial view of the district around Avenue de la Liberté
