= Pétrusse =

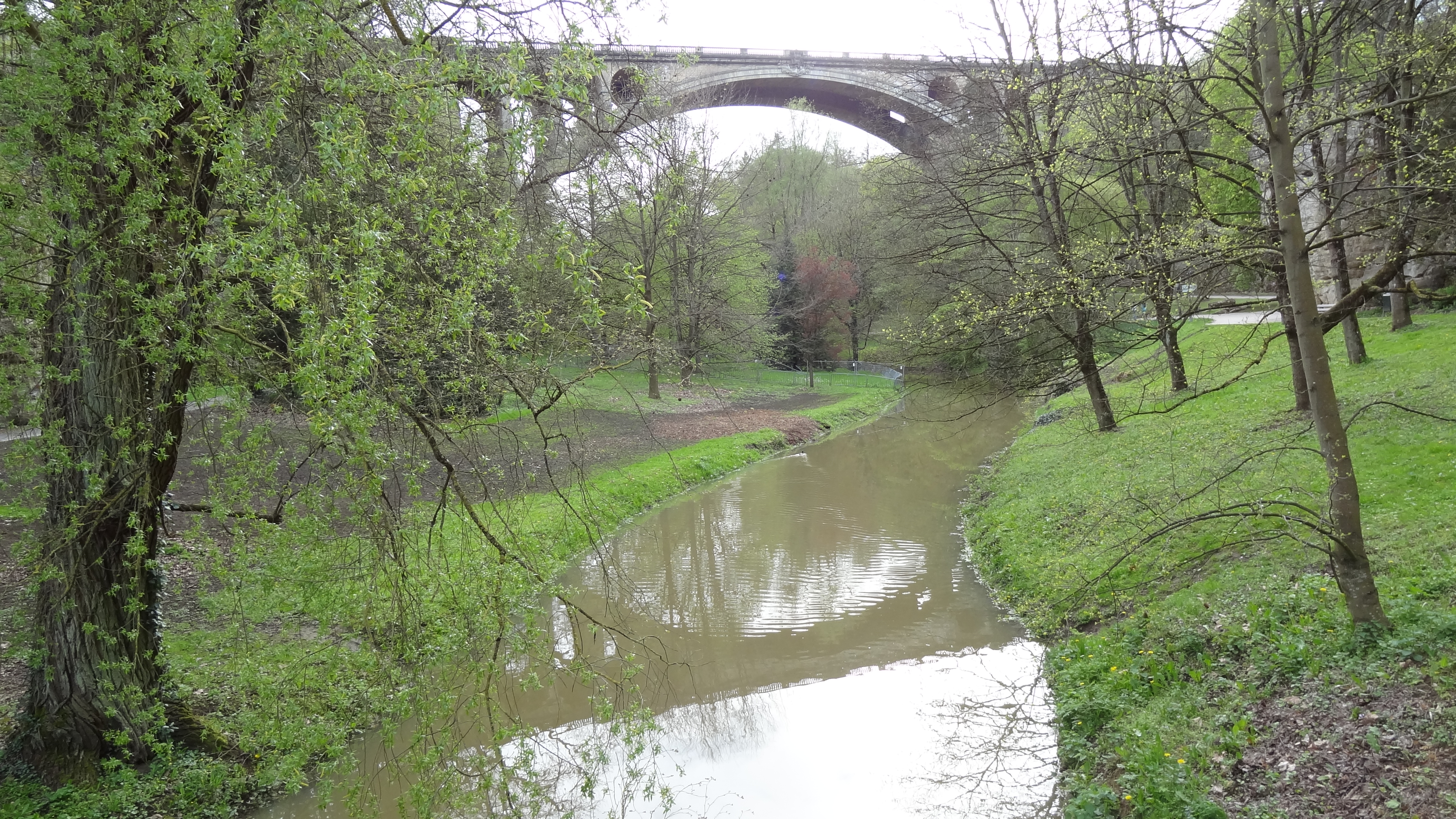

Location
- Country: Luxembourg

Physical characteristics
- Source
  - location: Dippach
- Mouth: Alzette
  - location: Luxembourg City
  - coordinates: 49.6074°N 6.1373°E
- Length: 11 km (6.8 mi)

Basin features
- Progression: Alzette→ Sauer→ Moselle→ Rhine→ North Sea

The Pétrusse (French pronunciation: [petʁys]; Luxembourgish: Péitruss [ˈpɜɪ̯tʀus]; German: Petruss) is a river flowing through Luxembourg, joining the Alzette at Luxembourg City. It flows through the town of Hollerich, and is 11 kilometres (6.8 mi) long and 50 metres (160 ft) deep.
