= Rosport =

Rosport Rouspert
- Coat of arms

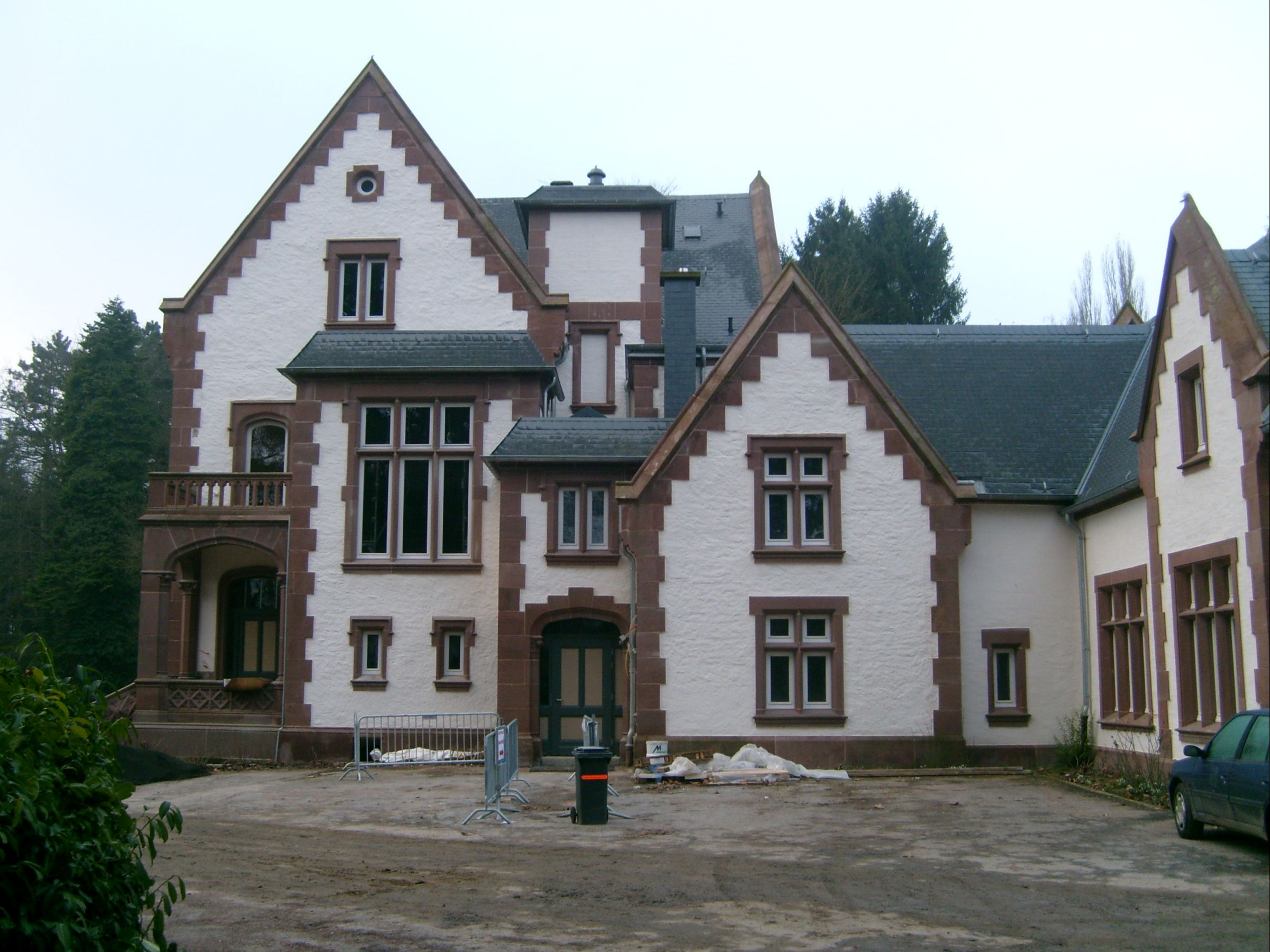
- Country: Luxembourg
- Canton: Echternach
- Commune: Rosport-Mompach

Government
  - Mayor: Romain Osweiler

Area
  - Total: 29.5 km^{2} (11.4 sq mi)

Population (2017)
  - Total: 2,293

Rosport (Luxembourgish: Rouspert) is a town in the commune of Rosport-Mompach, in the canton of Echternach, in eastern Luxembourg.

It was a separate commune until 1 January 2018, when it merged with Mompach to form the new commune of Rosport-Mompach.

As of September 2026, the town of Rosport has a population of 881.

Rosport Castle, built in 1892, was the home of the Luxembourg inventor Henri Tudor. Since May 2009, the castle has been home to the Tudor Museum where there is an exhibition based on his development of the lead–acid battery.

== Former commune ==
The former commune consisted of the villages:

- Dickweiler
- Girst
- Hinkel
- Osweiler
- Rosport
- Steinheim
- Fromburg (lieu-dit)
- Girsterklaus (lieu-dit)
