= 2021 European floods =

July 2021 flooding in Europe

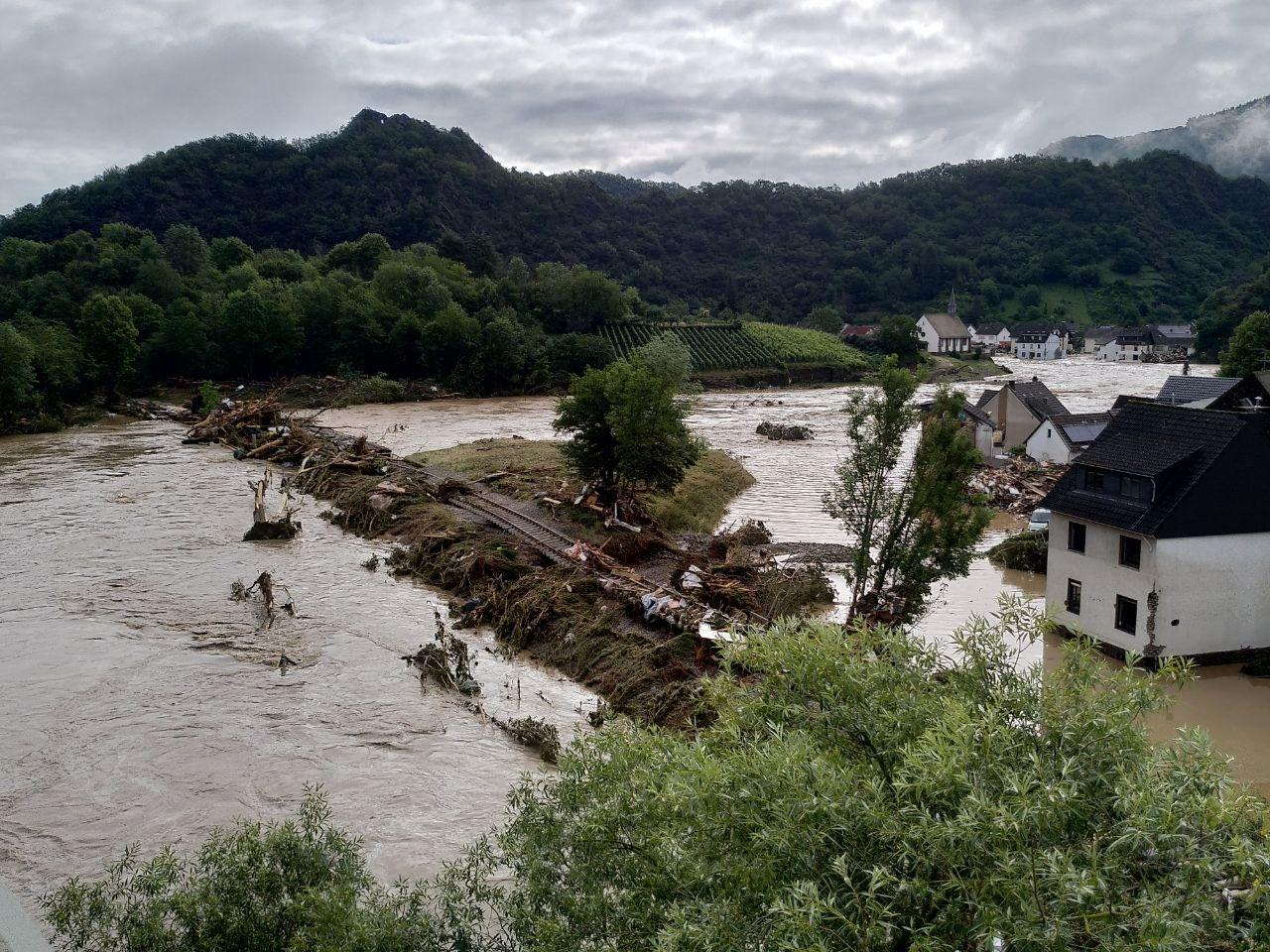
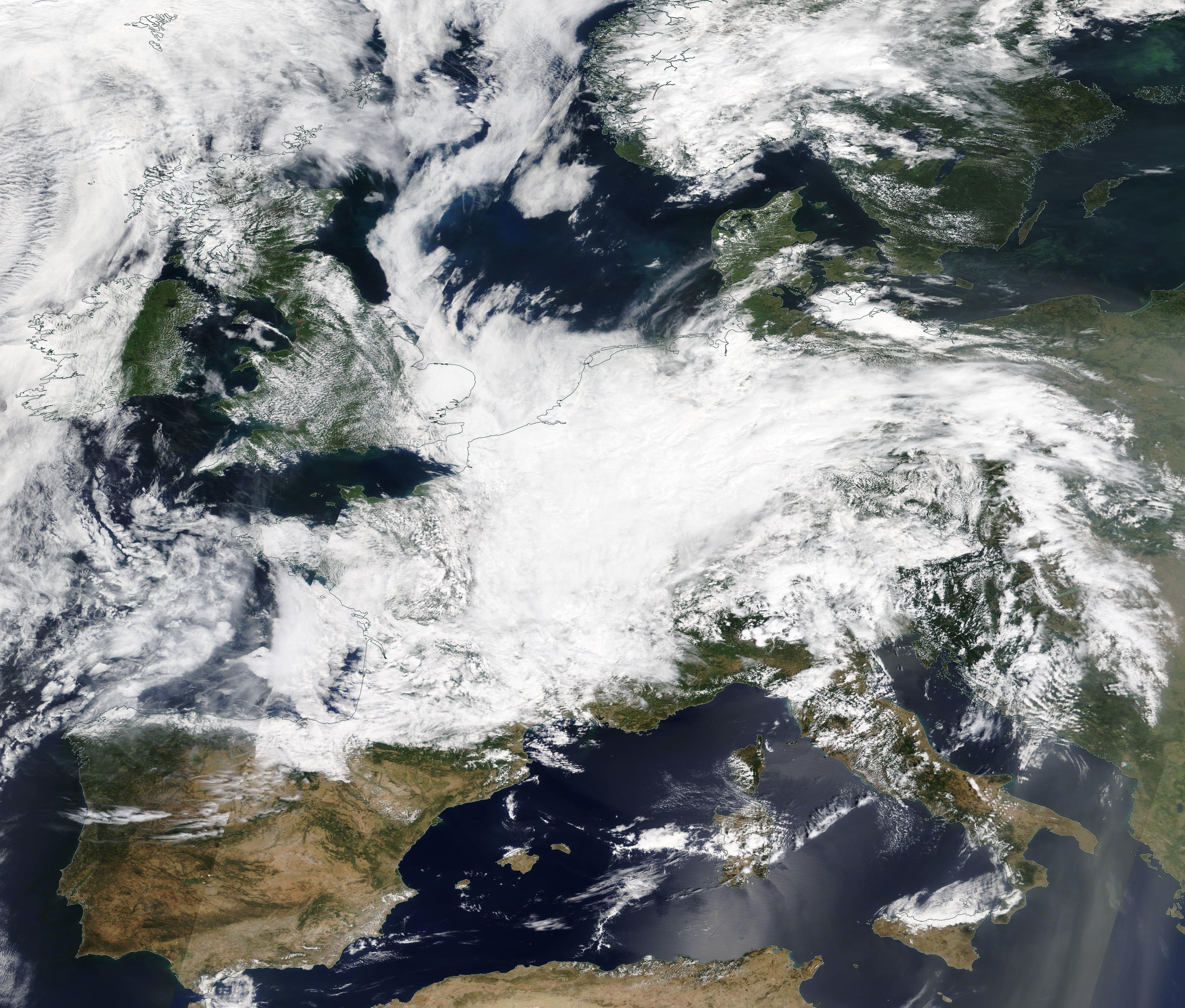
- From top: Flood and damage in Altenahr, Germany; the storm over Europe on 14 July.
- Date: 12–25 July 2021
- Location: Austria; Belgium; Czech Republic; Croatia; France; Germany; Italy; Luxembourg; Netherlands; Romania; Switzerland; United Kingdom
- Deaths: 243: 196 in Germany; 39 in Belgium; two in Romania; one in Italy; one in Austria
- Property damage: $54 billion (2021 USD): 200,000 properties left without power

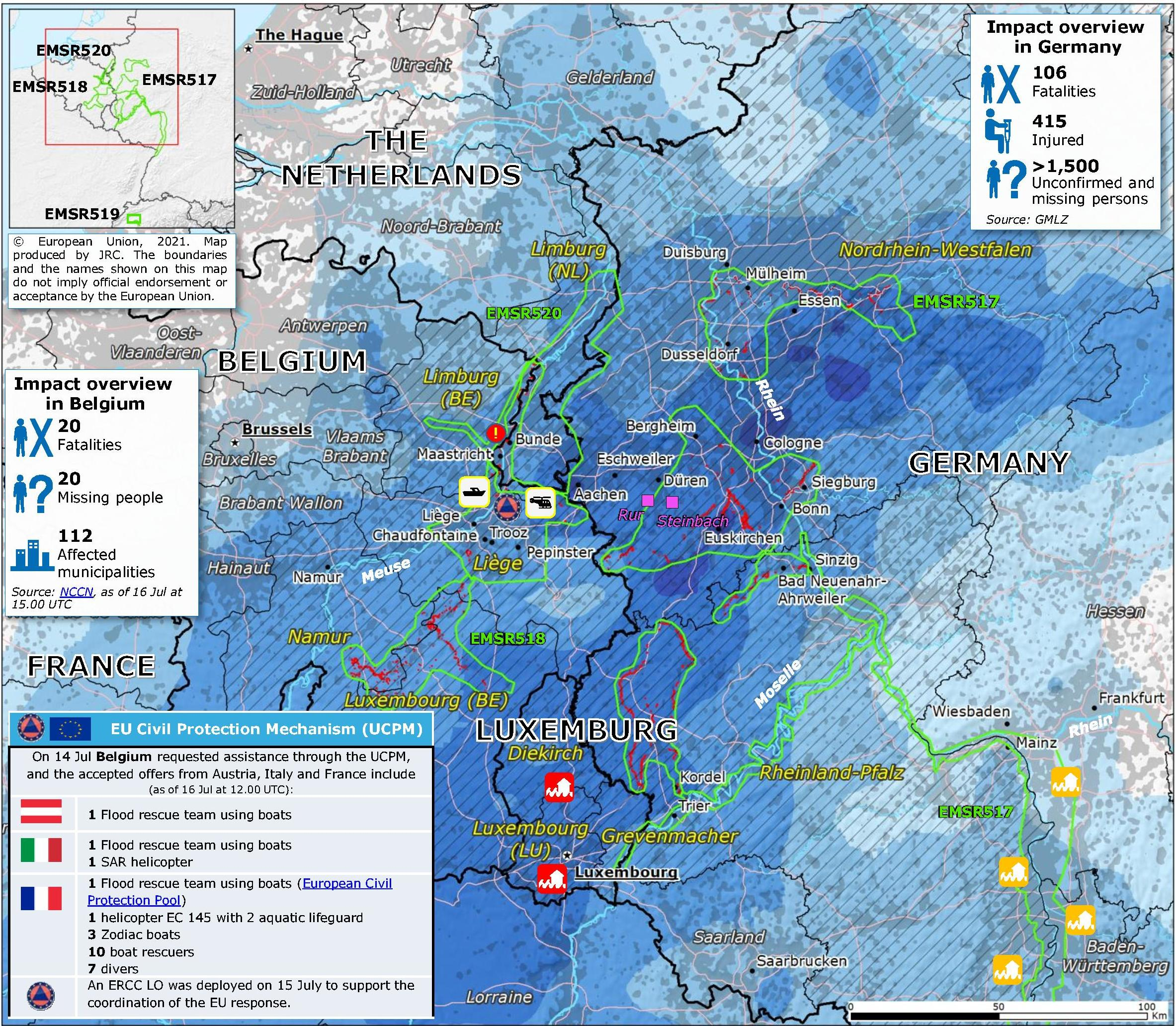
Areas affected, EU Emergency Response Coordination Centre (ERCC)

In July 2021, several European countries were affected by severe floods. Some were catastrophic, causing deaths and widespread damage. The floods started in the United Kingdom as flash floods causing some property damage and inconvenience. Later floods affected several river basins across Europe including Austria, Belgium, Croatia, Germany, Italy, Luxembourg, the Netherlands, and Switzerland. At least 243 people died in the floods, including 196 in Germany, 39 in Belgium, two in Romania, one in Italy and one in Austria.

Belgian Minister of Home Affairs Annelies Verlinden described the events as "one of the greatest natural disasters our country has ever known." German minister-president Malu Dreyer of the Rhineland-Palatinate state called the floods "devastating". In addition to the confirmed fatalities, the flooding led to widespread power outages, forced evacuations and damage to infrastructure and agriculture in the affected areas. The damage to infrastructure was especially severe in Belgium and Germany. The floods are estimated to have cost at least €2 billion (US$2.35 billion) in insured losses, with the total damage costs being much higher, amounted to be €46 billion (US$54 billion). In the aftermath, scientists, activists and reporters all highlighted the connection to global trends in extreme weather, especially more frequent heavy rainfall caused by climate change.

== Weather events ==
Between 12 and 15 July 2021, heavy rain fell across the United Kingdom, western Germany, and neighbouring Netherlands, Belgium, and Luxembourg. A storm complex moved east from France into Germany and stalled over the region for two days. Precipitation was intense in the East of Belgium, with 271.5 millimetres (10.69 in) of rain over 48 hours in Jalhay and 217 millimetres (8.5 in) over 48 hours in Spa. Heavy rainfall was also seen in the south of North Rhine-Westphalia and north of Rhineland-Palatinate in Germany where accumulations averaged 100 to 150 mm (3.9 to 5.9 in) in 24 hours, equivalent to more than a month's worth of rain. In Reifferscheid, 207 mm (8.1 in) fell within a nine-hour period while Cologne observed 154 mm (6.1 in) in 24 hours. Some of the affected regions may not have seen rainfall of this magnitude in the last 1,000 years. Floods started in Belgium, Germany, the Netherlands, and Switzerland on 14 July 2021 after record rainfall across western Europe caused multiple rivers to burst their banks.

The European Flood Awareness System (EFAS) issued alerts of life-threatening floods in advance, which, although very vague, were delivered to national authorities.

== Impact ==
=== Austria ===
On 17 July, a flash flood swept through Hallein, a town close to the German border. Rescue workers in the states of Salzburg and Tyrol were placed on high alert for flooding, and Chancellor Sebastian Kurz tweeted "heavy rains and storms are unfortunately causing severe damage in several places in Austria." A man died in Saalbach-Hinterglemm during the floods.

=== Belgium ===
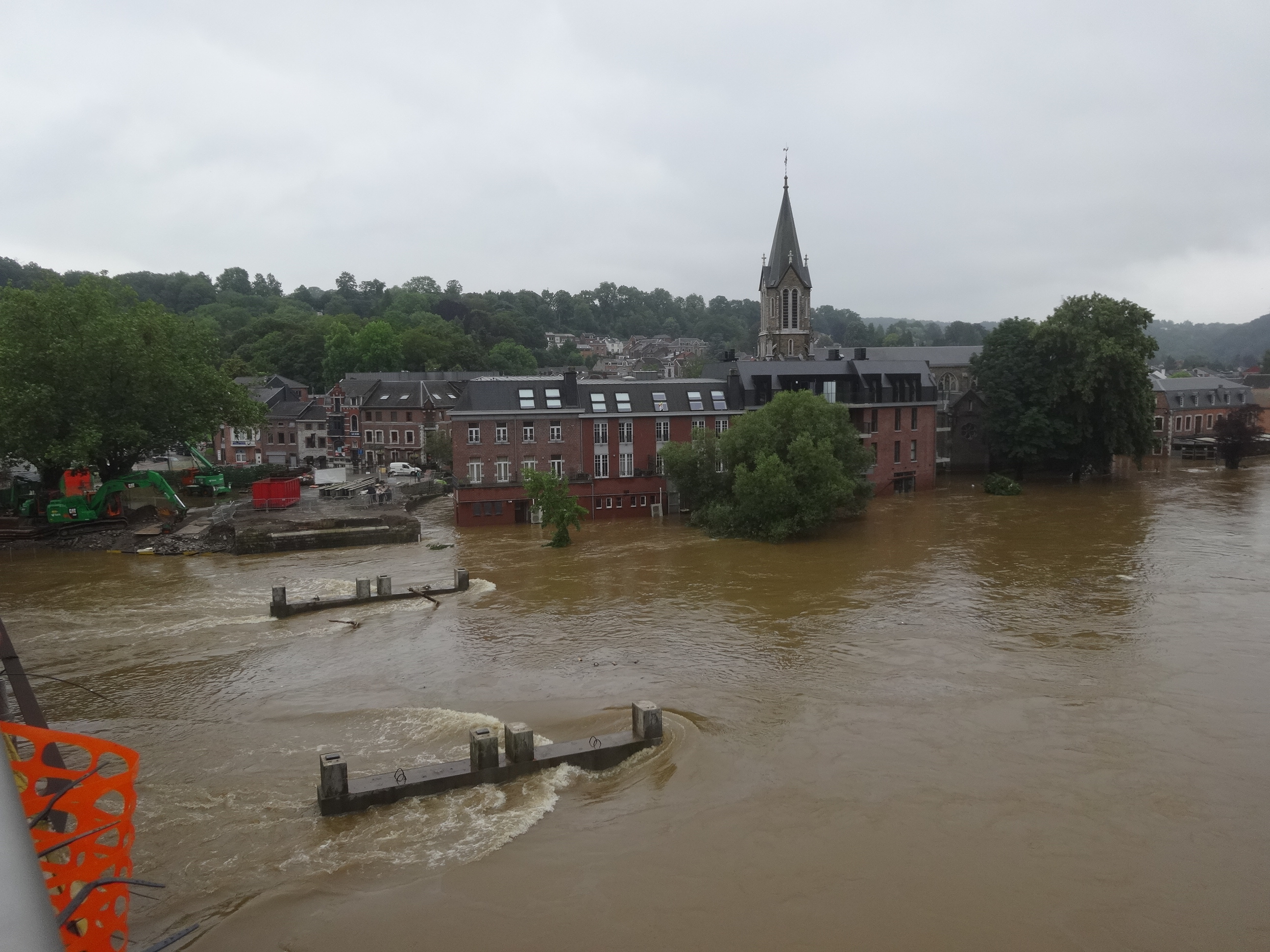
Flood damage in Tilff, Belgium

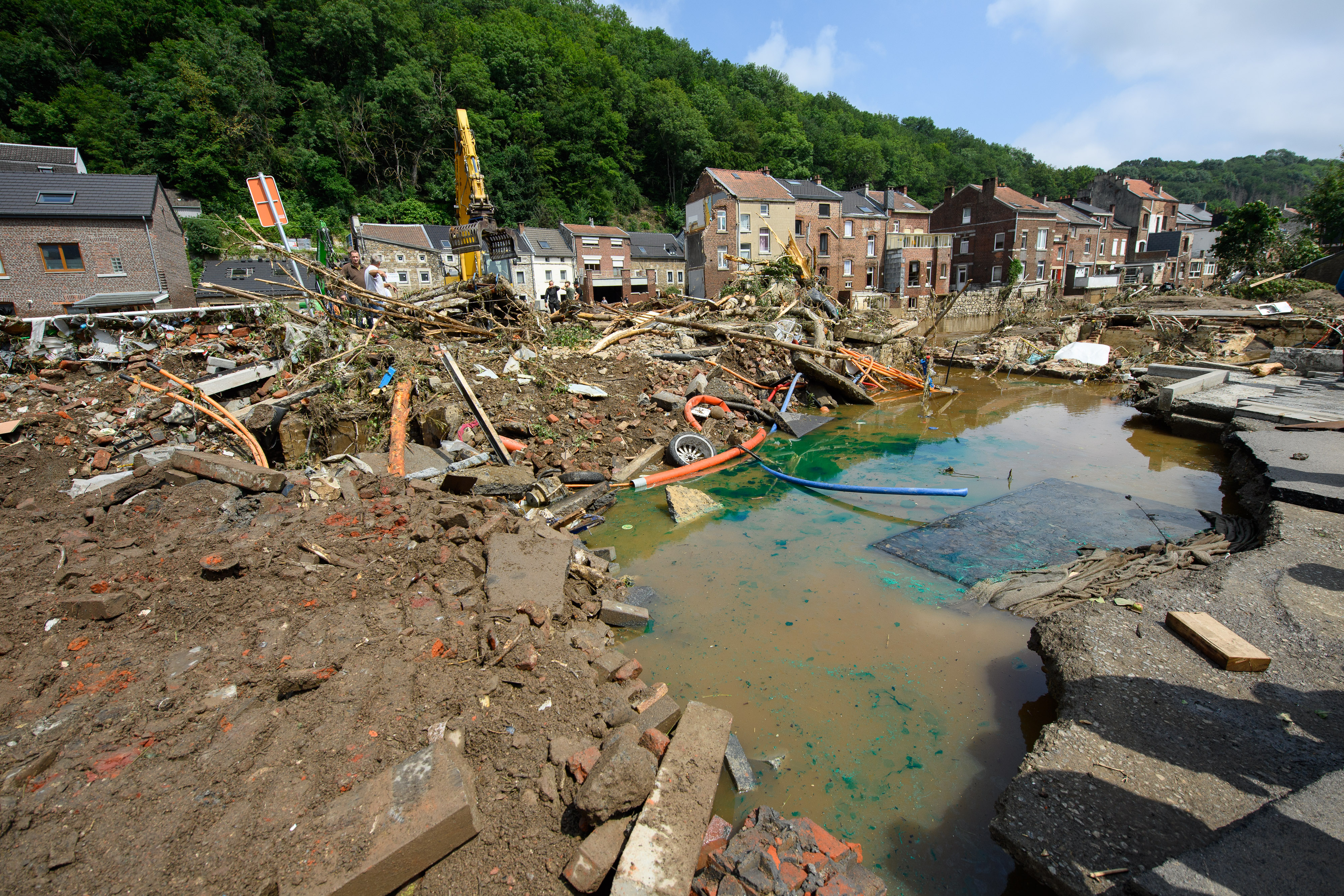
Flood damage in Pepinster, Belgium on 17 July

On 15 July, all residents of the city of Liège with a population of approximately 200,000 were urged to evacuate amidst fears that the Meuse river was on the verge of bursting its banks and that a dam bridge could collapse. No vehicles were allowed into the city centre of Liège; traffic was only allowed to leave as part of the evacuation. By 16 July, several smaller municipalities in Limburg Province were also given the order to evacuate. In addition, due to the heavy flooding and because tens of home fuel tanks had broken loose and started leaking into rivers, a number of municipalities in Liège and Namur provinces were left without potable tap water. Around 41,000 households were left without electricity in Wallonia. Foundations of buildings near rivers became eroded and buildings collapsed. In the town of Pepinster on the banks of the river Vesder, at least 20 houses collapsed and 23 of the 31 casualties as of 18 July were found here. The town of Verviers was also badly affected and has more than 10,000 of its residents having to be moved because of homes having become uninhabitable. Looting was also reported.

Precipitation was most intense in the east of Belgium, with 271.5 millimetres (10.69 in) of rain over 48 hours in the municipality of Jalhay, in the province of Liège—an absolute record for Belgium, almost three times the average rainfall over one month in this location for July. In the town of Spa, also in Liège, 217 millimetres (8.5 in) of rain fell over 48 hours.

An empty passenger train derailed at Grupont when the track bed was washed out by floodwater, with debris strewn across the track. The Charleroi–Namur–Liège line, and all railway lines in Belgium south east of that line, were closed. The overall damage to the rail network was estimated to take several weeks to repair. Early estimates also pointed to severe damage to the agricultural sector of the country, including long-term effects like soil erosion. During the flooding itself, farms and livestock had to be evacuated and many fields were damaged and crops destroyed by inundation. The Circuit de Spa-Francorchamps suffered damage to access roads and its digital safety infrastructure. The circuit was due to hold the 2021 Belgian Grand Prix on 29 August; damage was repaired sufficiently to allow the race to go ahead, although it was ultimately cut short after just one lap by further torrential rainfall and flooding at the circuit.

Belgian Prime Minister Alexander De Croo declared 20 July a national day of mourning.

In the evening of 24 July, southern and central parts of Belgium were hit again by severe flash floods as a result of intense but shorter thunderstorms. Particularly the city of Dinant and its surroundings in the province of Namur were badly hit, where tens of floating cars resulted in a pile-up and in damage to railroads.

=== Croatia ===
The Slavonia region was affected by floods. Communities such as Našice, Županja, Nova Gradiška, and Osijek were flooded and heavy rain caused serious damage, especially for farmers. No deaths were reported.

=== Czech Republic ===
Heavy rainfall led to flooding especially in North Bohemia, and several communities near Česká Lípa had to be evacuated. The country promised emergency aid to those affected by the floods of up to 57,900 koruna (2270 euro).

=== France ===
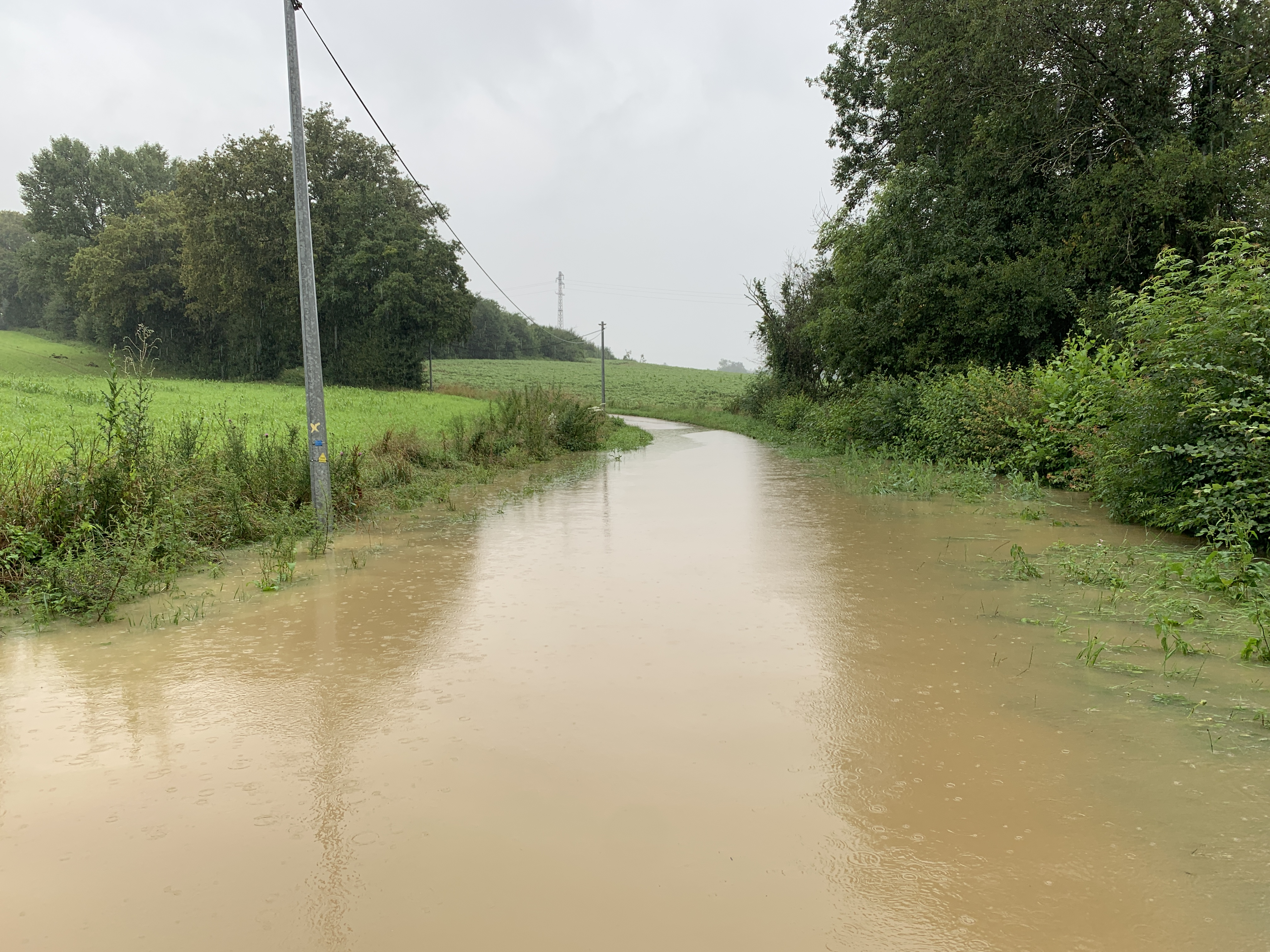
Floods in Saint-Cyr-sur-Menthon, France, 15 July

According to Météo-France, between 12 July, 8:00 and 16 July, 12:00, 199 millimetres (7.8 in) of rain fell in Châtel-de-Joux (Jura), 160 millimetres (6.3 in) in Plainfaing (Vosges), 159 millimetres (6.3 in) in Le Fied (Jura) and 158 millimetres (6.2 in) in Villiers-la-Chèvre (Meurthe-et-Moselle).

No deaths were reported.

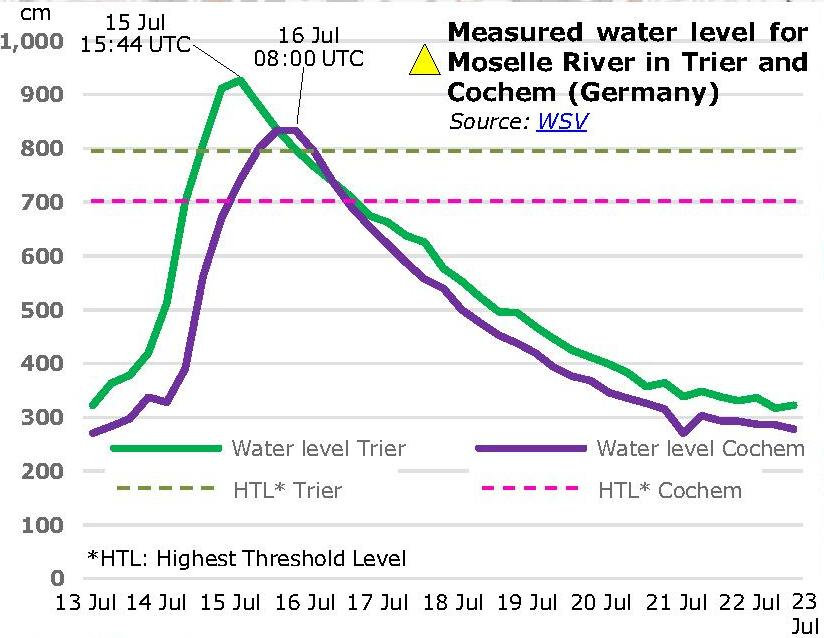
Measured water level for the Moselle River in Trier and Cochem

=== Germany ===
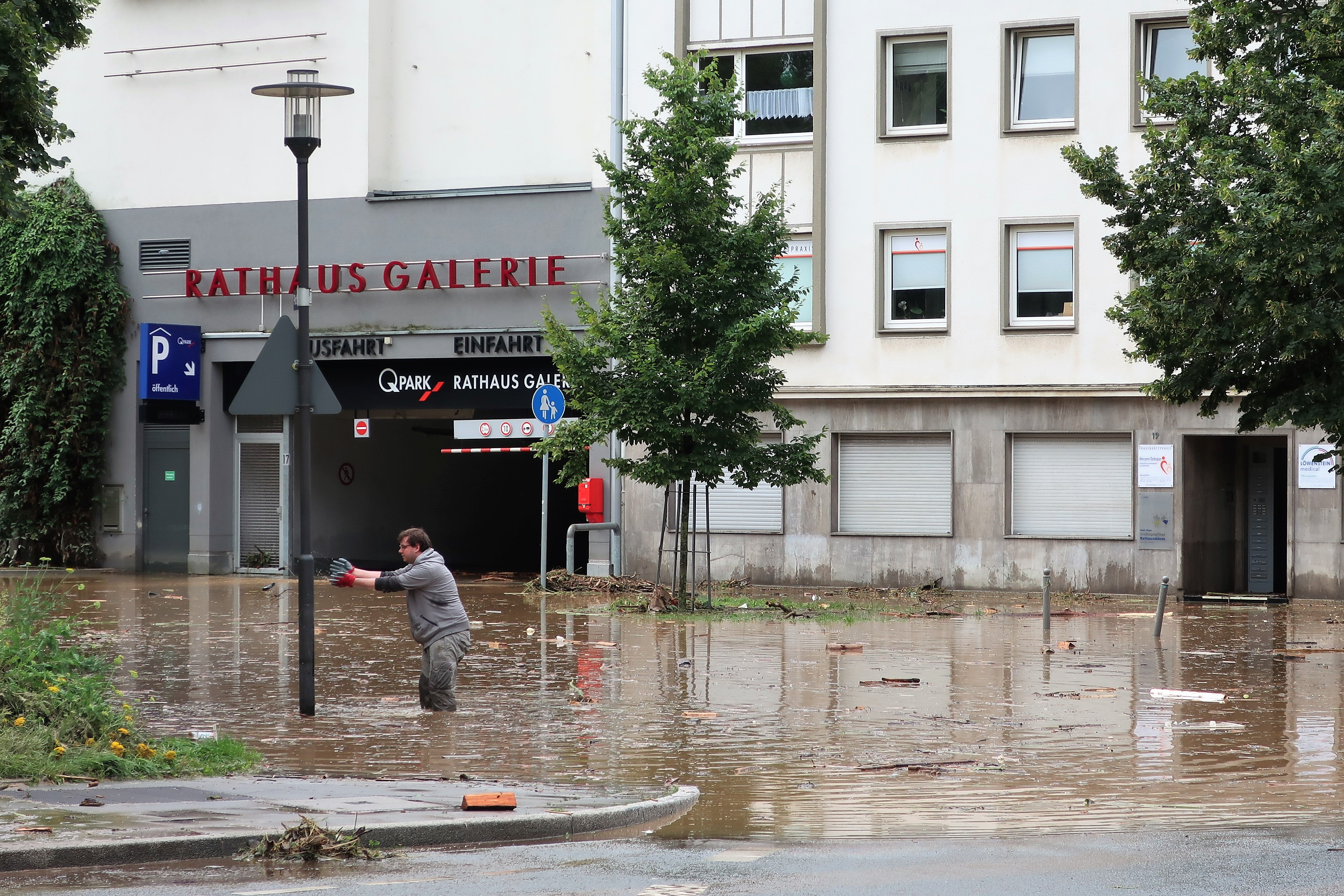
Flood damage in Hagen, NRW, Germany

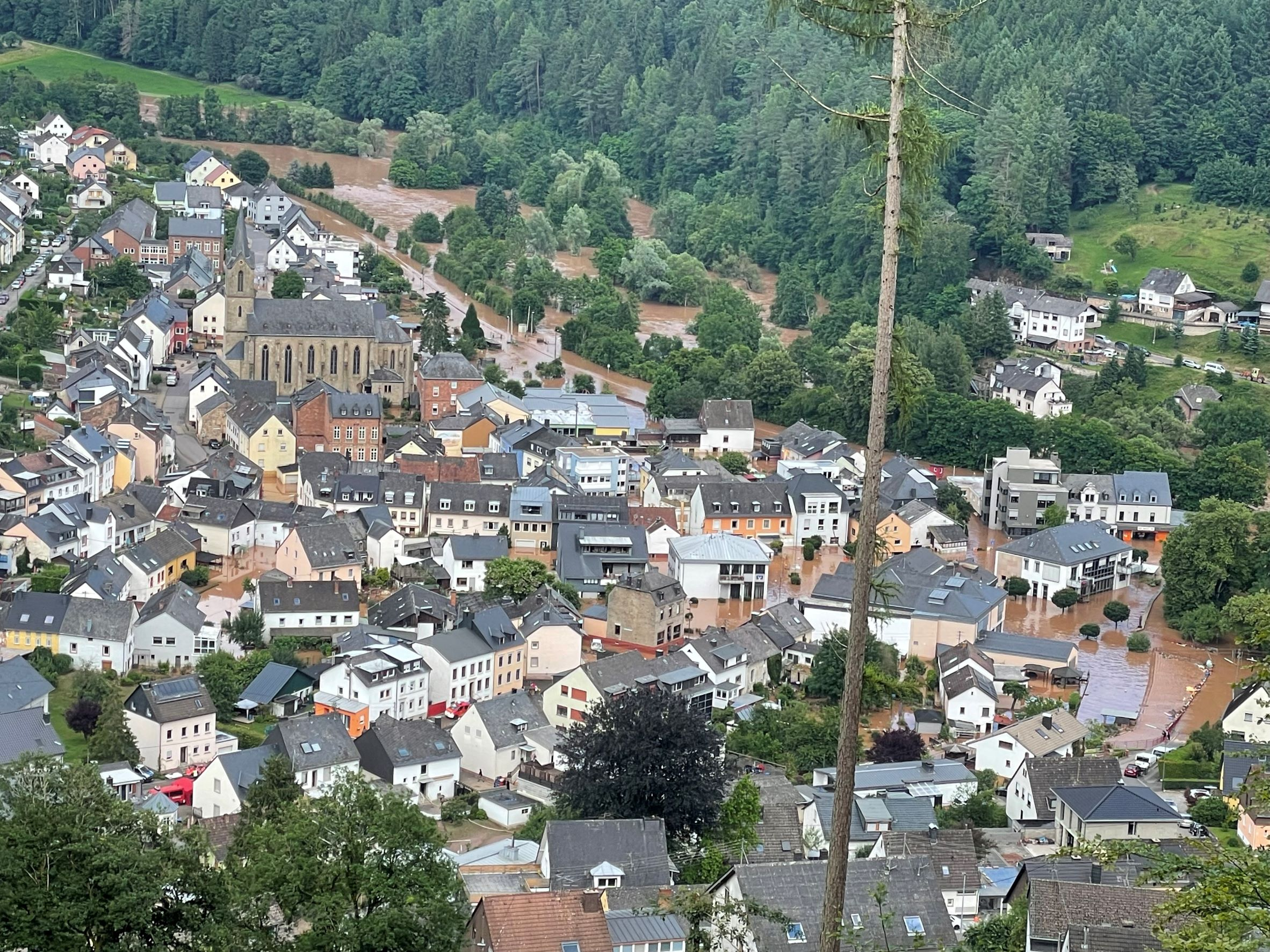
Flooding in Kordel, Rhineland-Palatinate, Germany

With at least 184 deaths, the floods are the deadliest natural disaster in Germany since the North Sea flood of 1962. 1,300 people had been initially reported as missing on 16 July, but mostly due to mobile networks being down in some regions which made it difficult to call people. It was considered unlikely that the number of deaths would rise that high, and while on 19 July the exact number of missing persons remained unclear, a search was ongoing for at least 150 people. Some 15,000 police, soldiers and emergency service workers were deployed in Germany to help with search and rescue.

During the floods, 135 people died in Rhineland-Palatinate (all of whom were in the district of Ahrweiler), 47 in North Rhine-Westphalia (twenty-seven of whom in Euskirchen), and two in Bavaria. Four firefighters were among the dead. Westnetz, Germany's biggest power distribution grid, stated on 15 July that 200,000 properties in the North Rhine-Westphalia and Rhineland-Palatinate regions were without power, and that it would be impossible to repair substations until roads were cleared. On 16 July, around 102,000 people were still without power. The German Weather Service reported that the quantity of rain in some areas of Germany was the highest in over 100 years, possibly higher than any seen in the last 1,000 years. They reported that some areas had received a month's average rainfall in one day.

Some of the worst damage from the flood was in the district of Ahrweiler, Rhineland-Palatinate, where the river Ahr rose, destroying many buildings and causing at least 110 deaths. The topography of Ahr valley in western Germany, with some sections resembling gorges, may have exacerbated the effects of the heavy rainfall. The flooding here was the worst since 1910 when up to 200 people were killed in flash flooding. On 14 July, the city of Hagen declared a state of emergency, after the Volme river started overflowing its banks. The village of Kordel in Trier-Saarburg, which has around 2,000 residents, has been completely cut off. Several rivers reached their highest water level to date, including the Kyll, which rose from an average level of 1 metre (3.3 ft) to 7.85 metres (25.8 ft).

A study published in Nature Communications presents a high-resolution, impact-based early warning system for riverine flooding, demonstrated using the 2021 European Summer Floods. The researchers used numerical weather prediction and hydrodynamic modeling to generate near-real-time flood inundation and impact forecasts, providing authorities with up to 17 hours of lead time. Their findings highlight the need for integrating such high-resolution forecasts into operational flood early warning systems to improve disaster preparedness and response.

On 15 July, Thalys train services to Germany were suspended, and Deutsche Bahn stated that many rail services in North Rhine-Westphalia were also cancelled. Deutsche Bahn reported that over 600 kilometres (370 mi) of track was affected in North Rhine-Westphalia. The Cologne–Wuppertal–Hagen–Dortmund and Cologne–Bonn (Main Central Station)–Koblenz lines were closed. The Cologne–Bonn Beuel–Koblenz line remained open, but trains were subject to delay and cancellation. Customers were asked to avoid travel within and to North Rhine-Westphalia by train. The train connection from Dresden to Prague was also suspended after mudslides buried the tracks. Along the Ahr Valley Railway, at least seven railway bridges have been destroyed.

In Blessem, floodwaters of the Erft river inundated a quarry on 16 July, leading to a major landslide with several people possibly dead. Several buildings collapsed including parts of Burg Blessem. Around 40 meters of the nearby Bundesautobahn 1 broke away and fell into the Erft, but no cars were on the highway since it was closed. Experts voiced concerns on 15 July that the Steinbachtal Dam was unstable and could burst, and 4,500 people were preemptively evacuated from parts of Euskirchen, and later several thousand more from parts of Rheinbach and Swisttal. Drones were deployed to inspect the dam; while no cracks were found, local politicians said the situation as of 16 July remained "critical". Several other dams in North Rhine-Westphalia, such as the Rur Dam, were also overflowing, but there were no concerns about their structural integrity. Regardless, on 16 July a dam of the Rur burst near Wassenberg, prompting the evacuation of Ophoven. Around 360 inmates had to be evacuated from a prison near Euskirchen due to a failing supply of water and electricity. In Eschweiler, all of the more than 300 patients of the St.-Antonius-Hospital Eschweiler had to be evacuated. The neighbouring town of Stolberg was also badly affected in the town centre and three districts. On 14 July, in Hagen, a veteran soldier rescued a 13-year-old girl who required mechanical ventilation as well as two elderly people using a MAN KAT1 which was usually exhibited in a local museum, after regular rescue vehicles were unable to get there in time.

Strong rainfall also led to flooding in the states of Baden-Württemberg and Saxony. As of 15 July, one person in Saxony remains missing.

Further strong rainfall on 17 July caused flooding in Saxony and Bavaria e.g. Berchtesgadener Ache, where at least one person died. The flooding damaged the Königssee bobsleigh, luge, and skeleton track where it washed away part of the track that will take until October 2022 to rebuild.

Direct damage caused by the flooding in Germany was estimated at €33.4 billion (US$39.3 billion) with further €7.1 billion (US$8.36 billion) in indirect damage.

=== Italy ===
On 14 July, the storms reached Northeastern Italy and caused damage to agricultural crops. In Trentino-Alto Adige, a fallen tree damaged a cable car and several roads were damaged, and in Veneto one person died.

=== Luxembourg ===
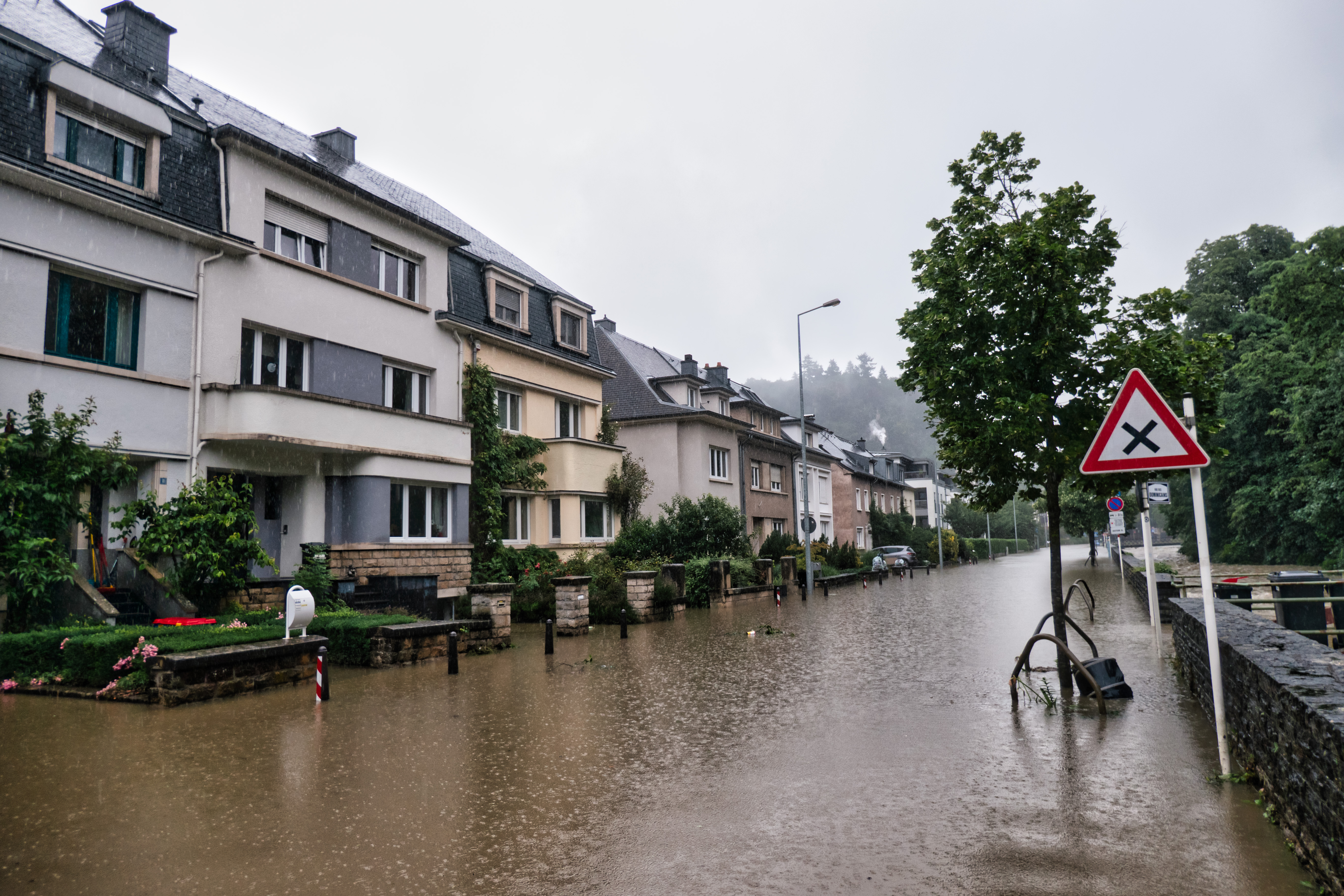
Flooded street in Clausen in Luxembourg City

In Luxembourg, hundreds of people were evacuated from their homes in Echternach and Rosport. Many homes in Mersch, Beringen and Rollingen lost electricity. The camping ground in Rosport had to be evacuated as a matter of urgency early on Thursday morning. Six people were brought to an emergency shelter in Osweiler cultural centre. Rosport sports centre was also used as emergency accommodation for people made to leave their homes. Mayor Romain Osweiler of Rosport explained the two buildings had been selected because they were accessible to people across the municipality.

=== Netherlands ===
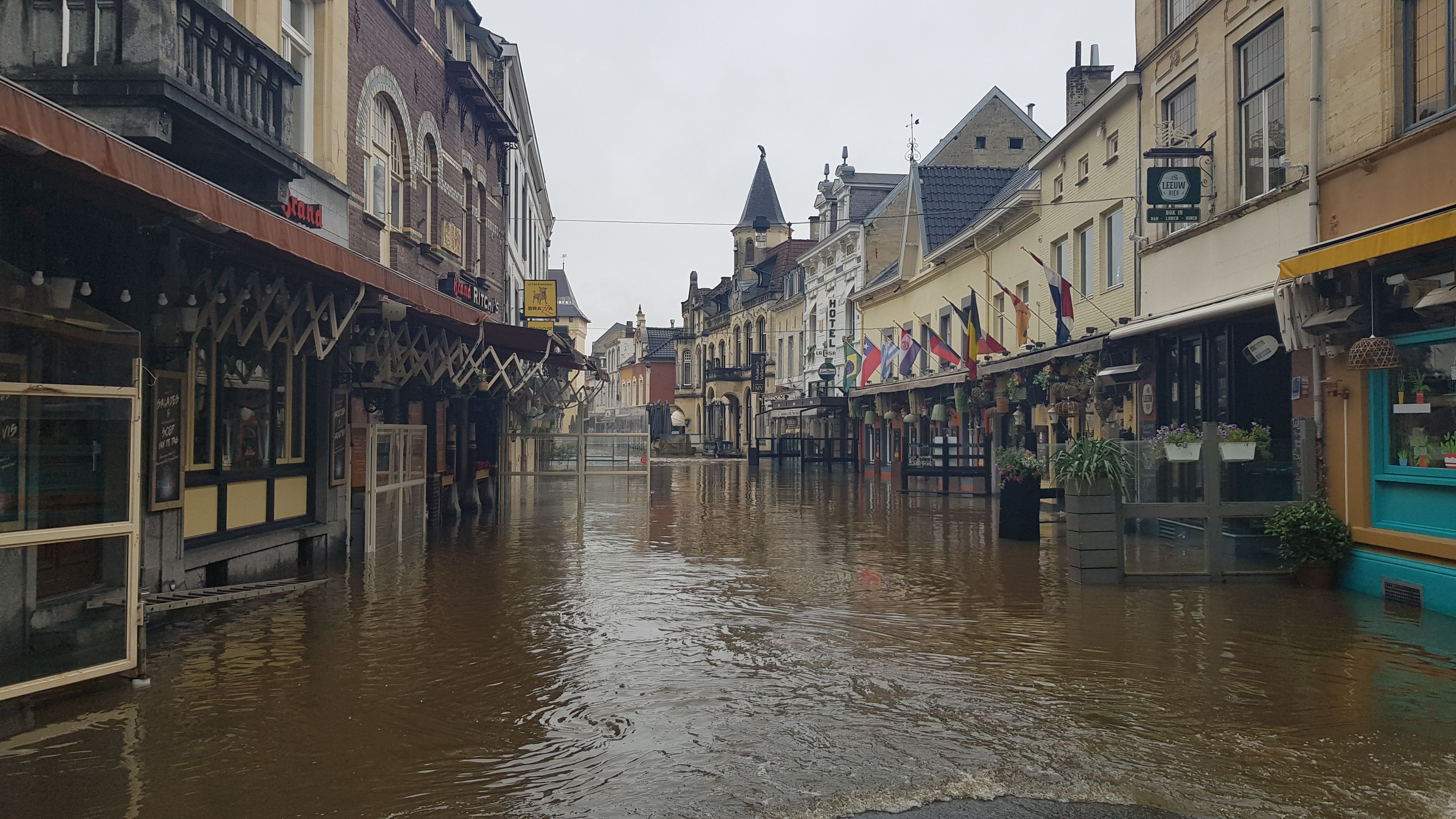
Flood of the Geul in the centre of Valkenburg aan de Geul, Netherlands

In the Netherlands, the southern town of Valkenburg aan de Geul and other areas in the valley of the river Geul were worst affected. In Valkenburg, several streets in the town centre were flooded as well as an area to the west of the town centre where an emergency evacuation took place in three care homes. On 15 July, King Willem Alexander and Queen Máxima visited the town. After the floodwaters had receded, damage was assessed at €400 million, half of which was physical damage and half being business losses. 2,300 families were affected in the town, 700 homes were rendered uninhabitable, and a bridge had collapsed. As of 21 July, the town was still subject to an evacuation order.

The River Meuse in Limburg reached its highest summertime level in over 100 years, according to authorities, and was expected as of 15 July to surpass the winter records set in 1993 and 1995. On 14 July, the Royal Netherlands Meteorological Institute gave a code red highest warning for Limburg. It was lowered to a yellow warning at around 03:50 local time on 15 July. Over 400 houses in Limburg lost power according to electricity company Enexis. As of 16 July 2021, mass evacuations started in Limburg and 300 military personnel were deployed.

On 16 July, a dyke on the Juliana Canal seemed on the verge of breaking, leading to the evacuation of several villages. In the end, the dyke held. The Dutch government declared the flooding to be an official disaster. More than 10,000 people were evacuated in Venlo and the neighbouring communities Belfeld, Steyl and Arcen on the same evening. The VieCuri Hospital in Venlo was also evacuated as a precaution against flooding from the Maas. A total of 240 patients were transferred to other hospitals in the region. It reopened on 21 July. Rainfall was in excess of 100 millimetres (3.9 in) in a day and 200 millimetres (7.9 in) over three days, said to be a once-in-a-millennium event. The state of emergency in Limburg was lifted on 21 July. The Dutch Army was drafted in to assist in the cleanup and with repairing damage.

Heavy rain in the early hours of 25 July caused flooding in the north west of Friesland. In De Westereen, 104.7 millimetres (4.12 in) of rain fell. A nursing home was flooded and evacuated.

=== Romania ===
In Alba County, rains and storms destroyed three houses and severely damaged another 20 in Ocoliș. More than 220 liters of precipitation per square meter fell in this area in five hours. A hailstorm also affected Cluj-Napoca on the night of 19 July. The Heroes' Avenue was completely flooded, cars were damaged by falling trees, some neighborhoods were left without electricity and two people were injured by flying debris. Two people were killed by floods in Satu Mare and Iași. Between 15 and 20 July, heavy rains caused flooding in 80 localities in 20 counties.

=== Switzerland ===
Video of a swollen river (Aare) in Thun, Switzerland, on 13 July 2021

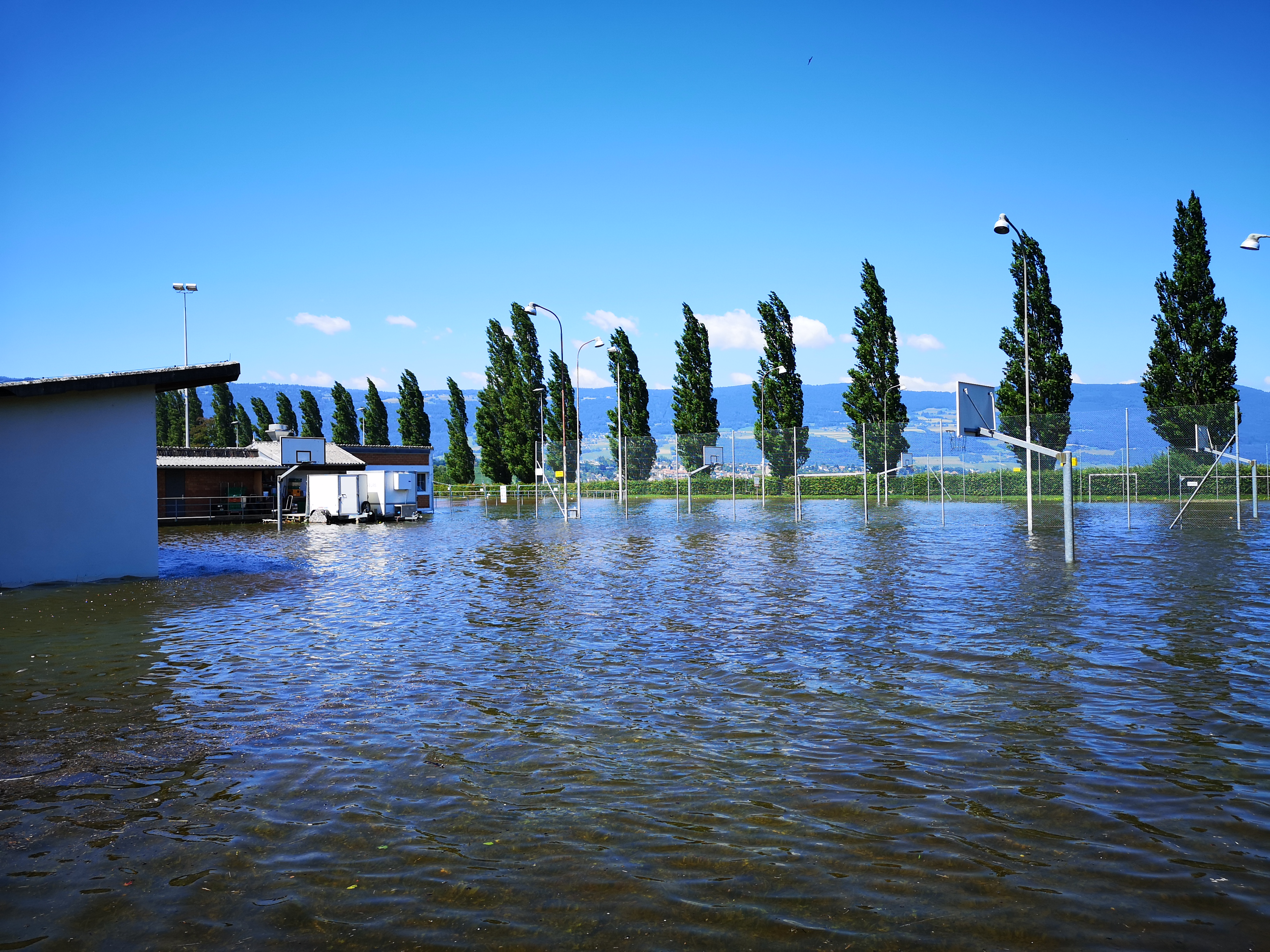
Flooded basketball court in Yverdon-les-Bains, Switzerland

On 15 July, Switzerland's weather service warned that flooding in the country would worsen over the next few days, potentially equalling the levels of the 2005 "flood of the century" and that there was a particularly high risk of flooding on Lake Biel, Lake Thun and Lake Lucerne, as well as a risk of landslides. That day, the water level in Lake Lucerne reached the highest warning level. While water levels on most lakes were receding by 20 July, Lake Neuchâtel still remained on the highest level since 1954. Several rail services were temporarily suspended, and a ban on large watercraft like container ships on the Rhine was affecting the country's access to some goods like petroleum products due to the high reliance on the Port of Switzerland.

=== United Kingdom ===
The cut-off low that caused the severe flooding across western Europe first moved over the United Kingdom on 12 July, resulting in more than the average monthly rainfall total to be recorded in a 24-hour period across parts of the country. Particularly severe flash flooding was reported in the London area, where 47.8 mm (1.88 in) of rainfall was recorded on 12 July at Kew, marking the third-wettest day on record for that weather station and the wettest since 6 July 1983. Both Putney in London and Chipstead in Surrey recorded more than 31 mm (1.2 in) of rainfall in a one-hour period, while other areas of London recorded over 76.2 mm (3.00 in) of rain in 90 minutes. The London Fire Brigade received more than 1,000 calls relating to flooding incidents, as houses were evacuated and cars were submerged by quickly rising floodwaters.

Heavy rainfall caused sewer systems to overflow, unable to handle the sudden intensity of the rainfall, resulting in streets and buildings being flooded by sewage. Thames Water received more than 2,500 calls relating to overflowing sewage, stating that the rainfall had surpassed the design capability of their sewage system; the heaviest rainfall occurred close to high tide, resulting in sewers that empty into the River Thames being unable to do so. In Notting Hill, floodwaters rose by 1.5 ft (0.46 m) in less than five minutes.

Sloane Square tube station was closed after floodwater from street level surged down stairways into the underground station; Chalk Farm, Hampstead and Wimbledon stations were also closed due to flooding. There was also a reduced level of service at Euston railway station, the London terminus of the West Coast Main Line and across the London Overground and Thameslink networks.

Overnight into 13 July, more than 120 residents of the Royal Borough of Kensington and Chelsea were placed into emergency accommodation due to severe flooding in the borough. Elsewhere in England, flooding was reported in the city of Southampton, blocking roads and railway lines.

On 25 July, London was again hit by thunderstorms and flash floods. Areas affected included Camberwell, Clapham, Hackney Wick, Woodford, and Nine Elms.

== Response ==
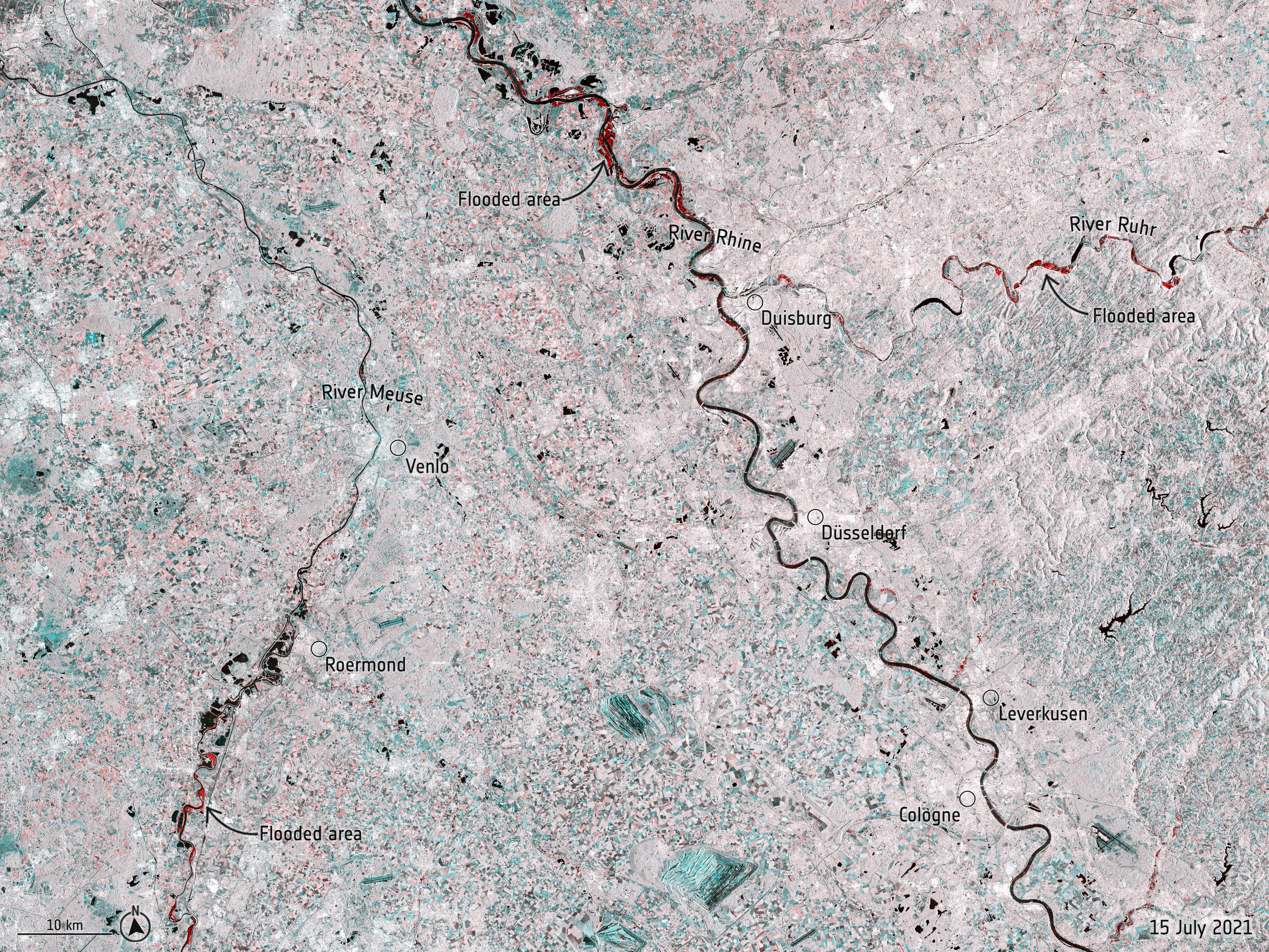
EU satellite imagery, 15 July 2021, showing flooded areas marked in red on the rivers Meuse (Belgium and Netherlands), Rhine (Germany) and Ruhr (Germany). Flooded areas extend beyond the field of this image.

German Chancellor Angela Merkel said she was "shocked by the catastrophe that so many people in the flood areas have to endure" and that her "sympathy goes out to the families of the dead and missing." Malu Dreyer, the minister-president of the Rhineland-Palatinate state, told the regional parliament: "There are people dead, there are people missing, there are many who are still in danger. We have never seen such a disaster. It's really devastating." On 16 July, the German Ministry of Defence declared a state of emergency in the parts of the country that were most affected. German Finance Minister Olaf Scholz on 17 July announced plans for a federal emergency aid of 300 million Euro.

The Belgian Minister of Home Affairs Annelies Verlinden described the events as "one of the greatest natural disasters our country has ever known" at a press conference on 19 July. On 15 July, the Belgian royal couple King Philippe and Queen Mathilde traveled to Chaudfontaine, which had been particularly badly hit by the flooding.

The President of the European Commission Ursula von der Leyen, the EU Council President Charles Michel and the European Commissioner for Crisis Management Janez Lenarčič all quickly provided statements of condolence for the victims and that the European Union was ready to help. After a Belgian request, the European Union Civil Protection Mechanism was activated on 14 July, and a helicopter and a flood rescue team was sent from France to Belgium immediately after this. The EU also provided satellite imagery and mapping of affected areas.

British Prime Minister Boris Johnson also said the UK was ready to provide assistance, while Italy and Austria offered to send flood rescue teams to affected areas in Belgium. Pope Francis sent condolences and prayers.

The Italian firefighters sent to Belgium to rescue the victims of the flood that hit Central Europe rescued at least 40 people in Tilff, an area south of Liège. Firefighters evacuated people who were stranded in their homes and in a nursing home.

== Connection to global climate change ==
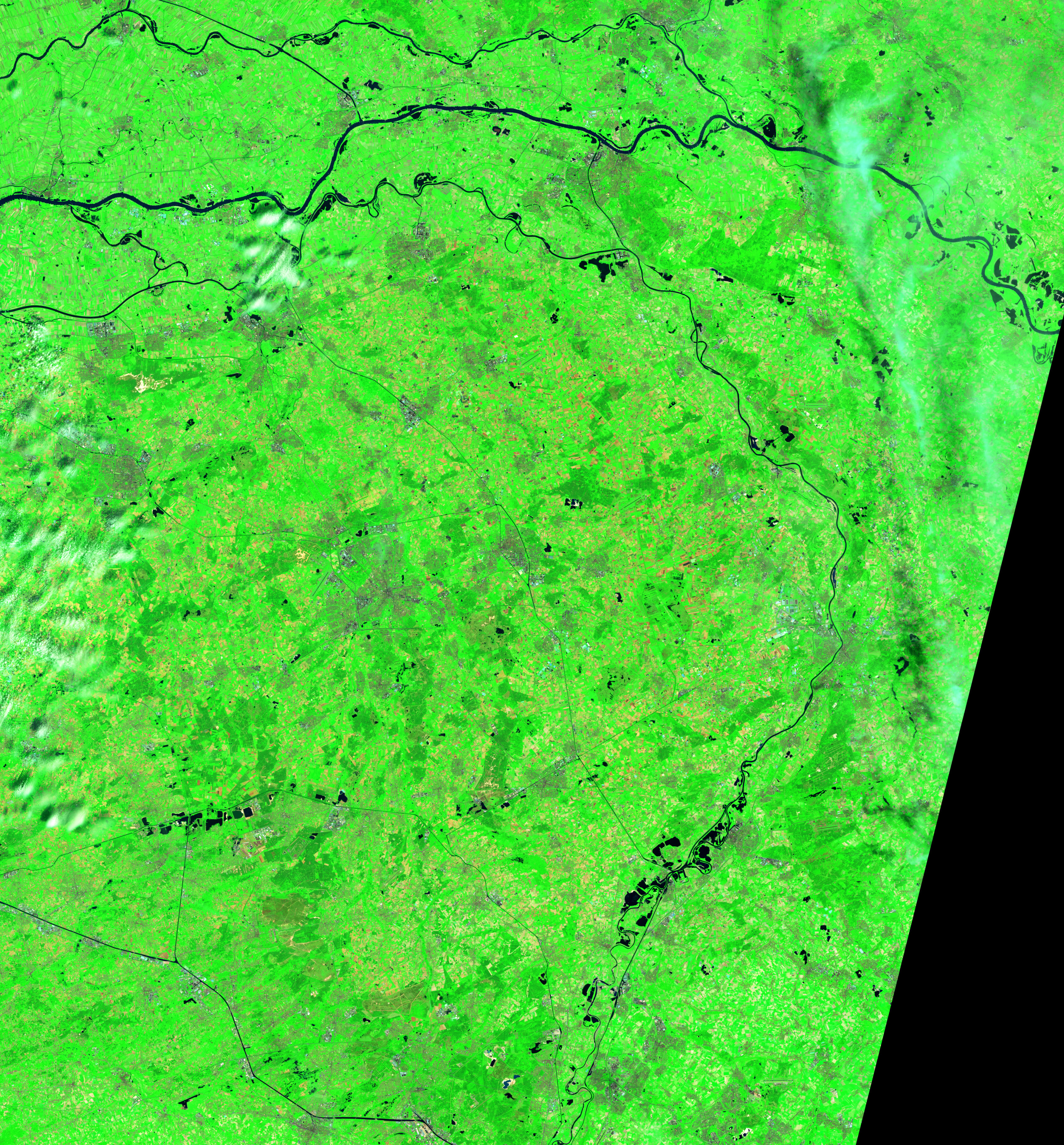
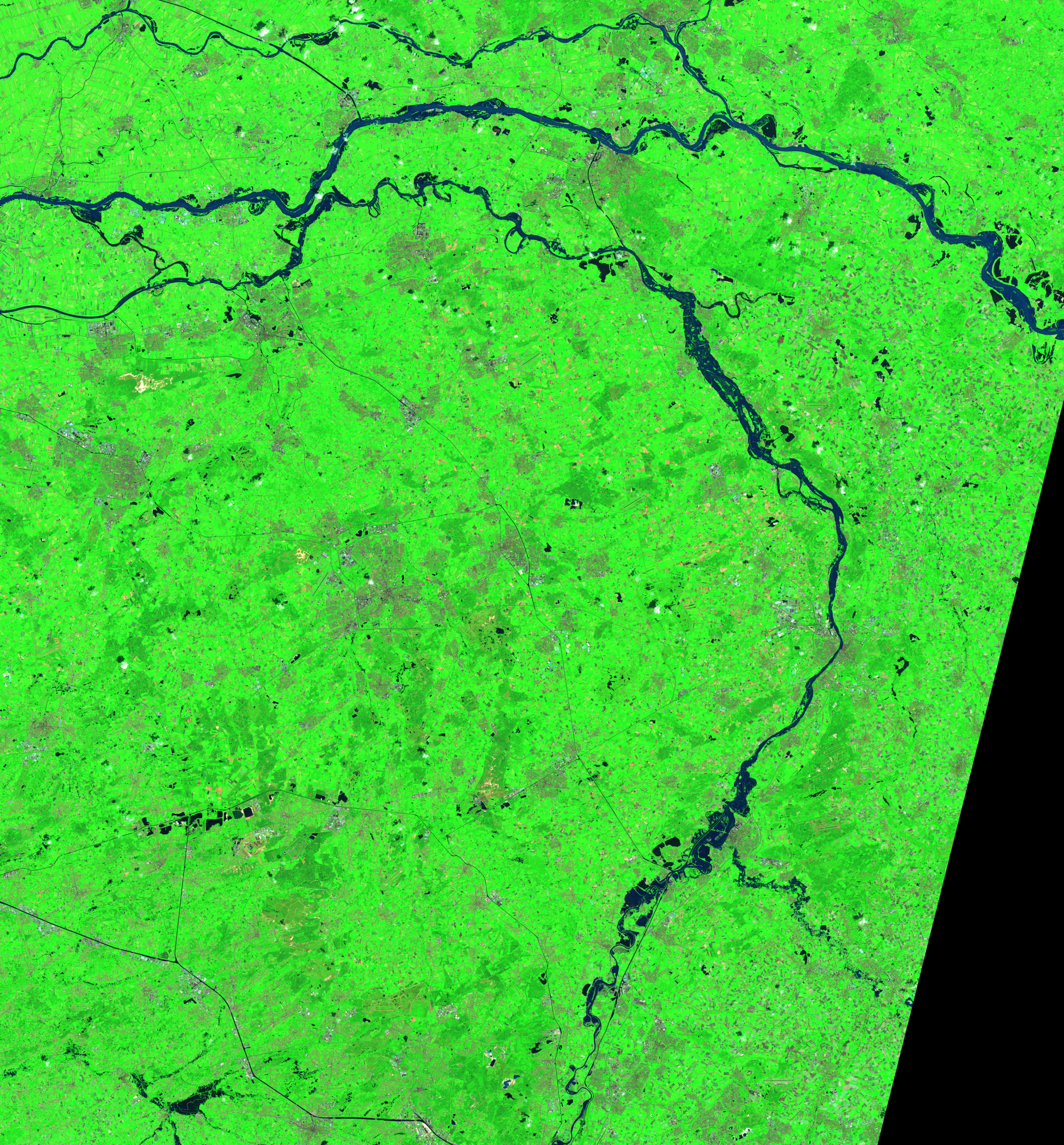
An image of the Meuse and Roer rivers on 16 June (left) and on 18 July (right) as captured by the Operational Land Imager (OLI) on Landsat 8 shows flooding along the rivers.

The floods followed unprecedented heat waves in the Pacific Northwest and Northern Europe, prompting scientists to evaluate a possible connection to climate change. Prior to the floods, scientists had warned that extreme weather events would become more common as a consequence of climate change. Examples of such extreme events would include heavy rainfall; an increase in the atmosphere's temperature allows it to absorb more water vapour, resulting in more precipitation. Climate change might also have resulted in the jet stream becoming more erratic, which could lead to more frequent extreme weather phenomena. Further research and analysis are needed to understand the extent of climate change's role in the floods.

Antonio Navarra, climatologist at the University of Bologna and president of the Euro-Mediterranean Center Foundation on Climate Change, said that there is a clear correlation between the increase in the concentration of CO_{2} in the atmosphere and the frequency and intensity of floods, heat waves and drought periods. Carl-FriCreedrich Schleussner of Humboldt-Universität Berlin said the question was not whether climate change had contributed to the event, but rather "how much". Dieter Gerten, a researcher from the Potsdam Institute for Climate Impact Research, characterised the magnitude of the floods and other extreme weather events as exceeding predictions from current climate change models, noting that the abrupt increase in the frequency and intensity of extreme weather may indicate that a tipping point has been crossed. Michael E. Mann from Penn State University, Hayley Fowler of Newcastle University and Kai Kornhuber of Columbia University pointed to a slowing in the jet stream as a possible explanation. Stefan Rahmstorf of the University of Potsdam warned that further losses of Arctic ice would likely result in a weaker jet stream and more extreme weather, saying "we should not play with this sensitive climate system".

In the aftermath of the flooding, a spokesperson of the World Meteorological Organization called for more action against climate change. On 13 July 2023, the European Union declared 15 July as the Annual EU Day for the Victims of the Global Climate Crisis, the date was chosen to commemorate the floods of 2021.

== See also ==
- List of deadliest floods
- List of floods
- List of floods in Europe
- List of flash floods
- 2021 Turkish floods
- 2021 Henan floods
- 2021 Maharashtra floods
- 2021 in climate change
- 2020–21 European windstorm season
- 2020–22 North American drought
- 2018–2021 Southern African drought
- 2021 floods in Bosnia and Herzegovina
- Return period
- managed retreat
