= Born, Luxembourg =

Coordinates: 49°45′N 6°31′E

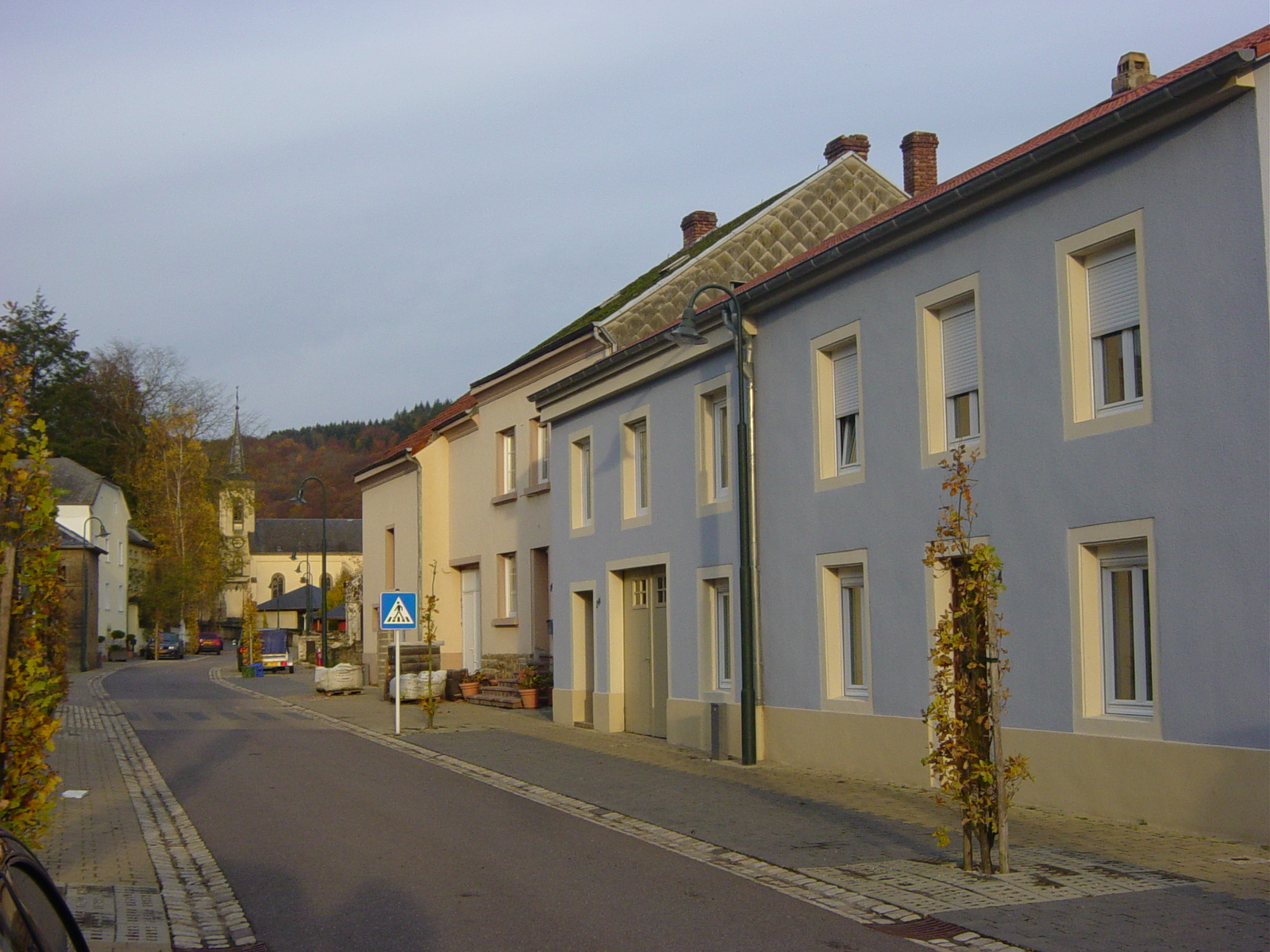
Centre of Born.

Born (German pronunciation: [bɔʁn]; Luxembourgish: Bur) is a village on the River Sauer in the commune of Mompach, in eastern Luxembourg. It lies on the N10, 14 km (9 mi) south of Echternach and 8 km (5 mi) north of Wasserbillig. Only a 5 minute drive from the E44 motorway from Luxembourg City to Trier, it is popular with tourists and day-trippers who walk, cycle or fish along the banks of the river.

As of September 2026, Born has a population of 417.

Luxembourg's sole cider making company, Ramborn, is located in Born.

== History ==
Around 54 BC, the Romans overcame the Treveri, a Gallic tribe who had lived in the area for several hundred years. The Romans became firmly established in nearby Trier or Augusta Treverorum, a prosperous regional capital, but they also developed communities in the Moselle and Sauer valleys, especially at Wasserbillig (Biliacum), the bridge over the Sauer on the Roman road from Trier to Reims (Civitas Remorum), and Echternach, the bridge on the road from Arlon (Orolaunum), to Bitburg (Vicus Beda). Despite a number of attacks from the middle of the third century, the Romans maintained their influence in the area until about 450 when they were finally conquered by Germanic tribes.

There is ample evidence of the Gallo-Roman civilization in the surroundings, not only the terraced orchards and vineyards but also Roman gravestones and monuments along the Sûre valley. Roman ruins have also been found at Pafebierg, not far from Born.

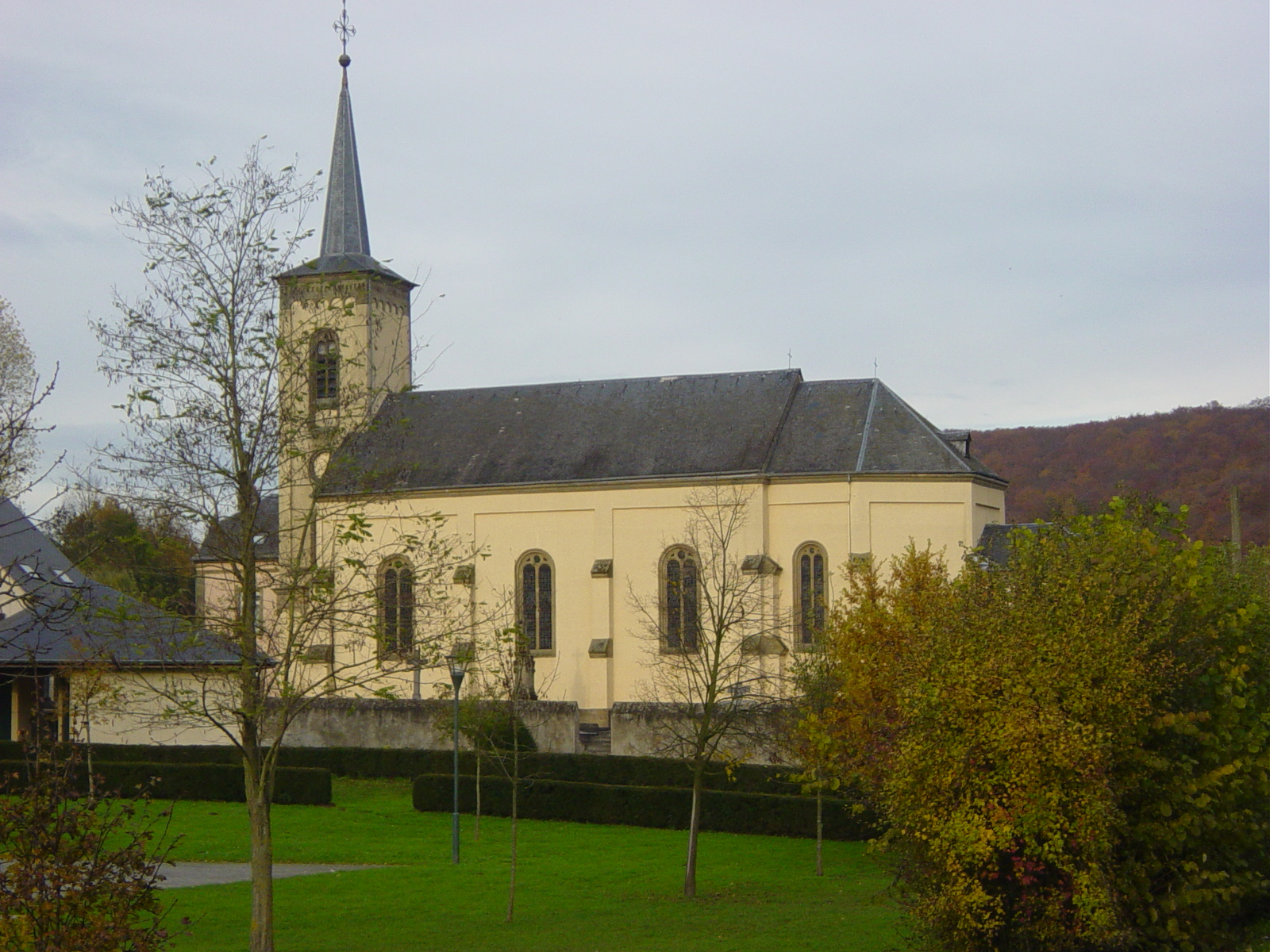
Born, Luxembourg - The Church

It seems probable that the area where Born now lies later came under the rule of the Abbey of Echternach around the 8th century although it is not specifically mentioned until 1286.

The parish church dates back to 1856 while Born Castle was built in the early 18th century although there are remains of much older buildings on the site and references dating back to the 13th century . The castle was originally owned by the Lords of Born consisting of members of the Hattstein, Faust d'Aschaffenbourg and de Villiers families.

The Prince Henri railway line from Echternach to Wasserbillig (via Born) was opened in 1874 and remained in service until 1963. The old track has now been converted into a cycle route.

== Geography and climate ==
Born, altitude 145 m (476 ft), is located between Rosport and Wasserbillig on the East bank of the River Sauer which forms the border between Luxembourg and Germany's Rhineland-Palatinate. Moersdorf is about 2 km (1 mi) south of Born, opposite the German village of Metzdorf. The steep hills on either side of the river reach a height of about 280 m (919 ft) and are used mainly for cattle grazing, orchards and forestry.

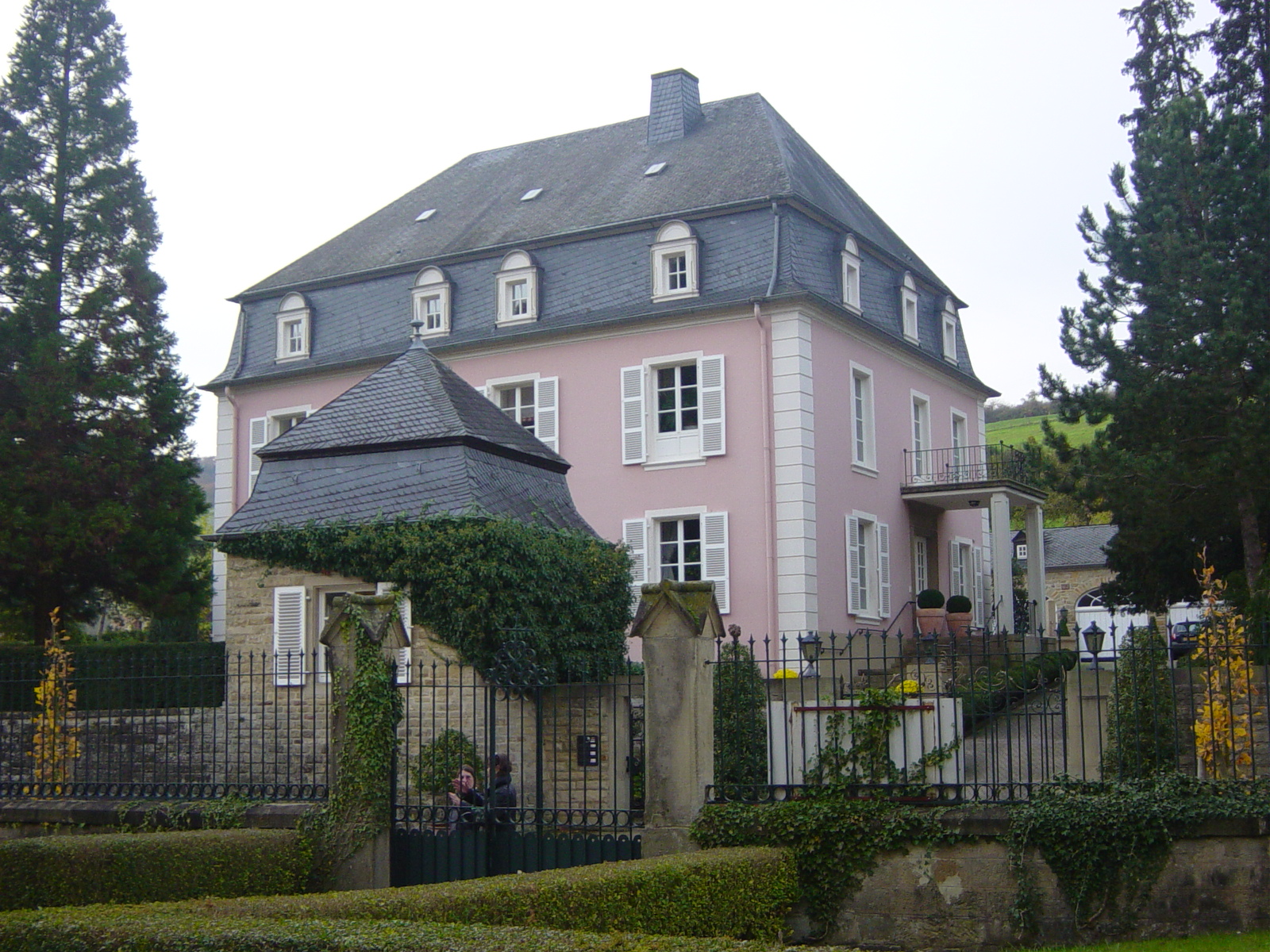
Château de Born, Luxembourg

In view of the NE-SW orientation of the river at Born, the community enjoys long periods of sunshine, unlike many of the villages along the Sauer which often lie in the shade of the hills. Summer temperatures average about 18 °C (64 °F) but often reach 30 °C (86 °F) and more. Rainfall is moderate. There is sometimes a little snow in the winter. Occasionally the River Sauer floods its banks, with the possibility of flooding in the village itself.

== Local services ==
Born is served by the Wasserbillig-Echternach bus route with buses every half-hour. From Wasserbillig, there are trains to Luxembourg and Trier.

Born has is a large camping site beside the river as well as two hotels and restaurants. There are several large supermarkets and stores in Wasserbillig (8 km or 5 mi) but there are also smaller shops in Rosport (4 km or 2.5 mi) and in the German village of Langsur (6 km or 3.7 mi) on the other side of the river.

The new primary school was opened in 2004. The Centre Polyvalent is used for concerts, exhibitions and local events.

== Tourism ==
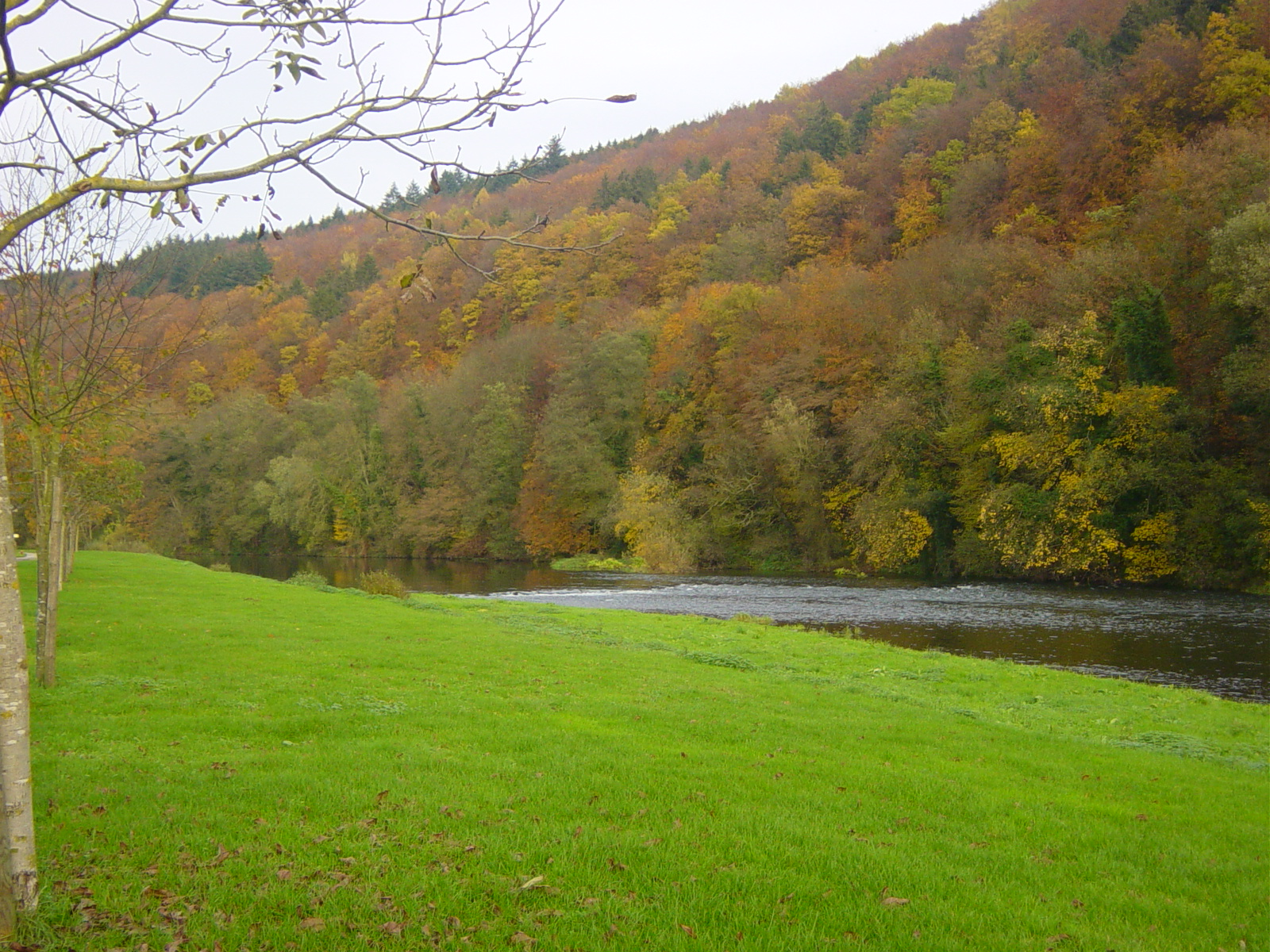
Banks of the River Sauer, Born, Luxembourg

Born is a riverside resort and visited by both Luxembourgers and foreign tourists, including from Germany and the Netherlands. The cycle track along the River Sauer is within reach of the Moselle Valley, Trier and Echternach. There are also a number of signposted walks in the area, offering views from the surrounding hills. And, at all times of the year, there is fishing along the banks of the Sauer.

During the summer months, there are several village fêtes, grill parties and brass band concerts in the town.
