= Herborn =

Herborn may refer to:

- Herborn, Hesse, a German town in the state of Hesse
- Herborn, Rhineland-Palatinate, a German village in the state of Rhineland-Palatinate
- Herborn, Luxembourg, a village in Luxembourg
- Herborn, Illinois, an unincorporated community in Shelby County, Illinois
- Herborn, New South Wales, a parish in Raleigh County, New South Wales
