= Tudor Museum =

Castle and science museum in Rosport, Luxembourg

Coordinates: 49°48′16″N 6°30′00″E

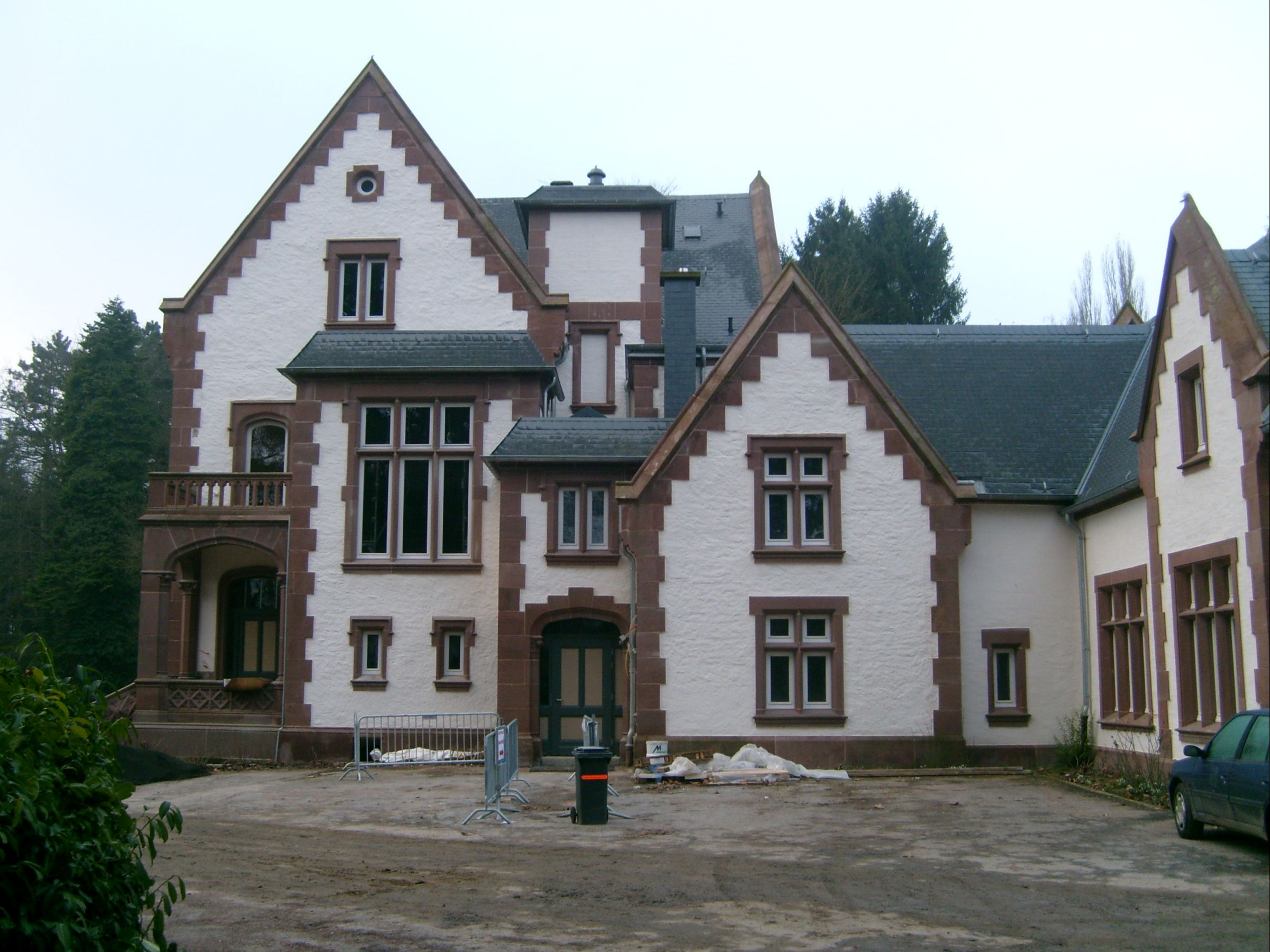
Henri Tudor Museum, Rosport

The Tudor Museum (French: Musée Tudor), also known as Rosport Castle (French: Château de Rosport, Luxembourgish: Schlass vu Rouspert), is located in the little town of Rosport (Luxembourgish: Rouspert) in north-eastern Luxembourg. Built in 1892, it was the home of the Luxembourg inventor Henri Tudor. Since May 2009, the castle has housed the Tudor Museum.

== Location ==
The building is located not far from the Irminenhof and is surrounded by magnificent gardens. Locally it is known as the neit Schlass or new castle.

== History ==
During the German occupation of Luxembourg in the Second World War, the castle was used to accommodate girls assigned to the Reichsarbeitsdient who performed farming and house-keeping work. Around 1957, it became a guest house and, in 1964, the American firm Monsanto converted it into a hotel. However business was not very successful and in 1970, the Commune of Rosport bought the castle for its own administrative offices while continuing to rent out the first-floor apartments to vacationers. In 1972, these were replaced by a holiday home for old people.

After restoration work was completed in 1999, serious consideration was given to opening a museum on the premises. In 1981, the celebrations for Tudor's 100th anniversary had included an exhibition on the development of the lead–acid battery, his principal success. Although the decision to go ahead with the museum was reached in 1995, many difficulties had to be overcome and it was only in May 2009 that the "Friends of the Henri Tudor Museum" were finally able to open it to the public.

== The castle today ==
In addition to the museum, the building houses the administrative offices of the commune of Rosport-Mompach. The museum itself is open all year round from Wednesday to Sunday, 2 pm to 6 pm. In July and August, it is also open on Monday and Tuesday afternoons.

== See also ==
- List of castles in Luxembourg
- List of museums in Luxembourg
