= Born Castle =

Coordinates: 49°45′39″N 6°30′53″E

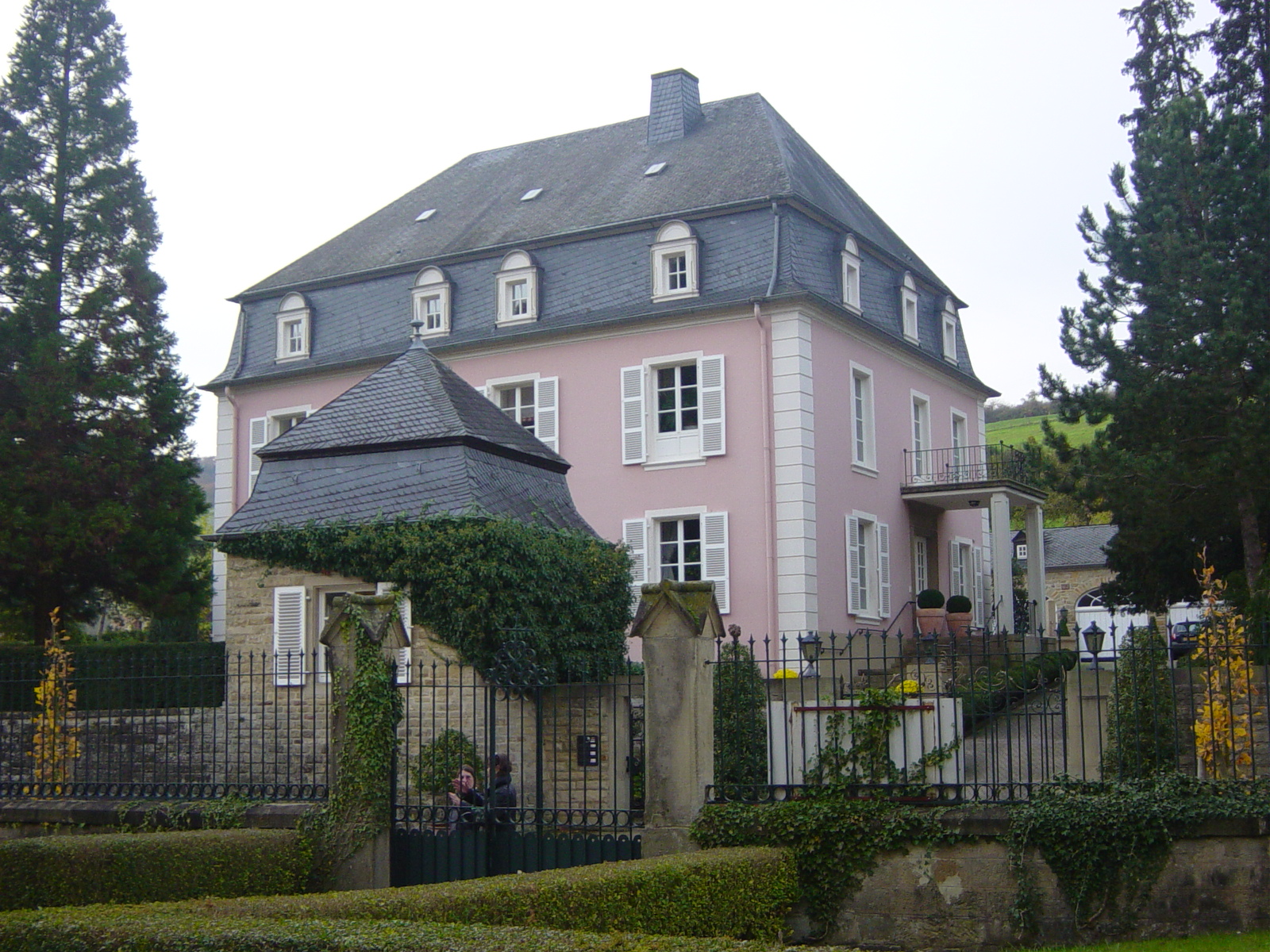
Born Castle

Born Castle (Luxembourgish: Schlass Bur; French: Château de Born; German: Schloss Born) is located in the centre of the little village of Born some 8 km (5 mi) north of Wasserbillig in south-eastern Luxembourg. It has a history dating from 1286 when the Lords of Born lived there. In particular, they were associated with the families of Hattstein, Faust d'Aschaffenbourg and de Villers. Today's castle was built on the old site in the 18th century and is privately owned.

== See also ==
- List of castles in Luxembourg
