= Canton of Echternach =

Canton of Echternach Kanton Iechternach (Luxembourgish) Kanton Echternach (German)
- Canton
- Coat of arms

- Coordinates: 49°48′N 6°24′E
- Country: Luxembourg
- Legislative constituency: Est
- LAU 1: LU00010
- Communes (cities in bold): Beaufort; Bech; Berdorf; Consdorf; Echternach; Rosport-Mompach; Waldbillig

Area
  - Total: 185.5 km^{2} (71.6 sq mi)
  - Rank: 10th of 12
- Highest elevation (9th of 12): 414 m (1,358 ft)
- Lowest elevation (3rd of 12): 141 m (463 ft)

Population (2026)
  - Total: 20,683
  - Rank: 8th of 12
  - Density: 111.5/km^{2} (288.8/sq mi)
  - Rank: 8th of 12

Echternach (Luxembourgish: Iechternach) is a canton in the east of Luxembourg. It is largely coterminous with the Mullerthal region. It borders Germany.

== Administrative divisions ==
Echternach Canton consists of the following seven communes:

- Beaufort
- Bech
- Berdorf
- Consdorf
- Echternach
- Rosport-Mompach
- Waldbillig

== Mergers ==
- On 1 January 2018 the former communes of Rosport and Mompach were merged to create the commune of Rosport-Mompach. The law creating Rosport-Mompach was passed on 24 May 2011.

== History ==
The origin of the Canton of Echternach, like that of all the cantons of the Grand Duchy, dates back to a decree of 31 August 1795, by the Committee of Public Safety in the final days of the Convention.

The Canton of Echternach was bordered to the north by the cantons of Vianden and Bitbourg, to the west by the cantons of Diekirch and Mersch, and to the south by the canton of Grevenmacher.

Originally, the Canton of Echternach was quite different in its territory from what it is today since it extended over both banks of the Sûre, from Dillingen to Moersdorf. On the left bank, in current German territory, it included Bollendorf, Ernzen, Irrel, Edingen, Ralingen, Wintersdorf, Metzdorf, Grevenich, Fusenich, Mesenich, and Liersberg. The population at that time was 7,751 inhabitants.

At the creation of the canton with 2,030 inhabitants, the capital, Echternach, was by far the most important locality. It was followed from a distance by Bollendorf, with 694 inhabitants, and other localities, all having less than 500 inhabitants. In the 1947 census, Echternach appeared with 3,141 inhabitants.

Upon the establishment of the Forêts department in 1795, the 37 cantons of the department were grouped into 4 districts (arrondissements): Bitbourg, Diekirch, Luxembourg, and Neufchateau. There was no Moselle district. Of the three cantons that currently make up this district, those of Remich and Grevenmacher fell under the arrondissement of Luxembourg, while the Canton of Echternach belonged to the arrondissement of Bitbourg. As the district capital, Bitbourg was the seat of a lower court. However, in 1810, this court was transferred to Echternach because this locality had extensive premises for public services in the disused abbey buildings. However, the sub-prefecture remained in Bitbourg.

This was the situation when, in 1815, the Grand Duchy lost the territories east of the Our, Sûre, and Moselle, and consequently, the Canton of Echternach lost a third of its territory. The administrative reorganization following this dismemberment divided Luxembourg into 32 cantons grouped into 5 districts: Marche, Saint-Hubert, Neufchâteau, Diekirch, and Luxembourg. This time, the Canton of Echternach was part of the Diekirch district, which was supplemented by the remnants of the former Bitbourg district not annexed by Prussia, i.e., the part of the Canton of Echternach on the right bank of the Sûre. This resulted in Echternach, which had been the seat of the Bitbourg district court, now only serving as the magistrate's seat for the canton.

The administrative and judicial subordination to Diekirch caused deep dissatisfaction in Echternach. The inhabitants felt that the downgrade of their city — with 3,400 inhabitants, the second-largest city in the Grand Duchy — in favour of Diekirch, with only half that population, was an unjust degradation.

In 1819, the Regency, i.e., the municipal council of Echternach, sent an address to the King of the Netherlands requesting that the city be established as the capital of an administrative and judicial district, consisting of the cantons of Echternach, Grevenmacher, and Betzdorf.

The officials recounted the misfortunes that had befallen the city since the French invasion in 1795. First, the abolition of the abbey, a source of wealth, they said, through the influx of foreigners and a source of work for labourers. Then, in 1815, the new border drawn on the Sûre had two disastrous consequences: the abolition of the Bitbourg district court established in Echternach and the loss of the hinterland constituted by the Bitbourg district on the other side of the Sûre. Although a sub-prefecture, Bitbourg, with barely a thousand inhabitants, could not compare as a commercial, industrial, intellectual, and religious center with the old abbey city. It had been the true centre of the district. The loss of this region, now blocked by Prussian customs, led to the decline of trade and industries in Echternach, such as pottery, textiles, leather, and boat manufacturing.

This depiction of the difficulties faced by Echternach at the time is confirmed by Governor Willmar's report on the inspection tour he made in 1821 in the region. It stated that "the administrators of the city of Echternach painted vivid pictures of the distress weighing on all classes of inhabitants."

In the 1819 address to the sovereign, speaking of the rival town of Diekirch, the officials of Echternach did not mince words. They described Diekirch as a "poorly built town," where there was a shortage of housing. "The only resource until now," they said, "has been a poorly built, unhealthy convent where, at great cost, the sous-intendant [term for the district commissioner], a judge, two lawyers, a tax collector, the vicar of the parish, and a bailiff reside. This convent is to be sold."

Echternach's request had two demands. Firstly, the allocation of a new district court. This request was rejected by the government of the Netherlands.

Secondly, the creation of a district of Echternach. Consulted on this matter for advice, the Provincial States of the Grand Duchy also rejected this demand because, they said, Echternach, "forming the extreme border of the Grand Duchy towards Prussia, is in a position obviously contrary to the good of the service."

By royal decree of 2 January 1832, the extent of the districts was reduced, and their number increased from 5 to 8. Thus, the Moselle district of Grevenmacher was born, of which the Canton of Echternach was a part. As one might imagine, this time too, the inhabitants of Echternach were not pleased to see that the choice of the capital had fallen on a locality that, at the time, had just over 2,000 inhabitants, while the old abbey city had 3,400.

At that time, the canton had nine municipalities: Beaufort, Bech, Berdorf, Born, Consdorf, Mompach, Rosport, and Waldbillig, plus Echternach, administratively designated not as a municipality but as a city.

Later, the canton underwent minor modifications. In 1829, the municipality of Born was abolished, with the Born section being merged with the municipality of Mompach, and the other sections (Dickweiler, Girst, and Hinkel) being attached to the municipality of Rosport. Thus, the Canton of Echternach was reduced to the 8 municipalities it currently possesses.

This was the situation when, the political ties of the Grand Duchy with the Netherlands and Belgium having been severed by the London Treaty of 1839, Luxembourg, reduced to a third of its territory and half of its population, acquired the character of a state.

At that time, Echternach, surrounded by a strong wall with five gates, had 3,417 inhabitants. In terms of industry, it had two pottery factories, and the production of woollen fabrics employed many artisans at home. Nevertheless, with its rich historical past, it was an isolated locality from the rest of the world since no major road led there. The first road leading to it came from Luxembourg and was only built in 1847. It was traversed daily by a stagecoach.

No road led from Echternach either to Diekirch at the junction of the main road from Liège and Aix-la-Chapelle or to Wasserbillig at the junction of the main road from Trier. The road from Echternach to Diekirch was only built in 1867. However, as the connections between the two cities were important, before the construction of the road, the private merchant and banker Joseph Tschiderer of Diekirch had created around 1849 a boat service between Diekirch and Echternach for the transport of passengers.

== Population ==
Historical population

Year	Pop.	±%
1821	10,696	—
1851	15,150	+41.6%
1900	12,639	−16.6%
1910	12,389	−2.0%
1922	11,750	−5.2%
1935	11,152	−5.1%

Year	Pop.	±%
1947	10,293	−7.7%
1960	9,820	−4.6%
1970	9,934	+1.2%
1981	10,649	+7.2%
1990	11,649	+9.4%
2000	13,422	+15.2%

Year	Pop.	±%
2005	14,899	+11.0%
2010	16,041	+7.7%
2015	17,728	+10.5%
2020	19,189	+8.2%
2021	19,463	+1.4%

Source data

== See also ==
- Little Switzerland, a nickname given to this area of Luxembourg.
