= Herborn, Luxembourg =

Village in the commune of Rosport-Mompach in Luxembourg

Coordinates: 49°44′N 6°26′E

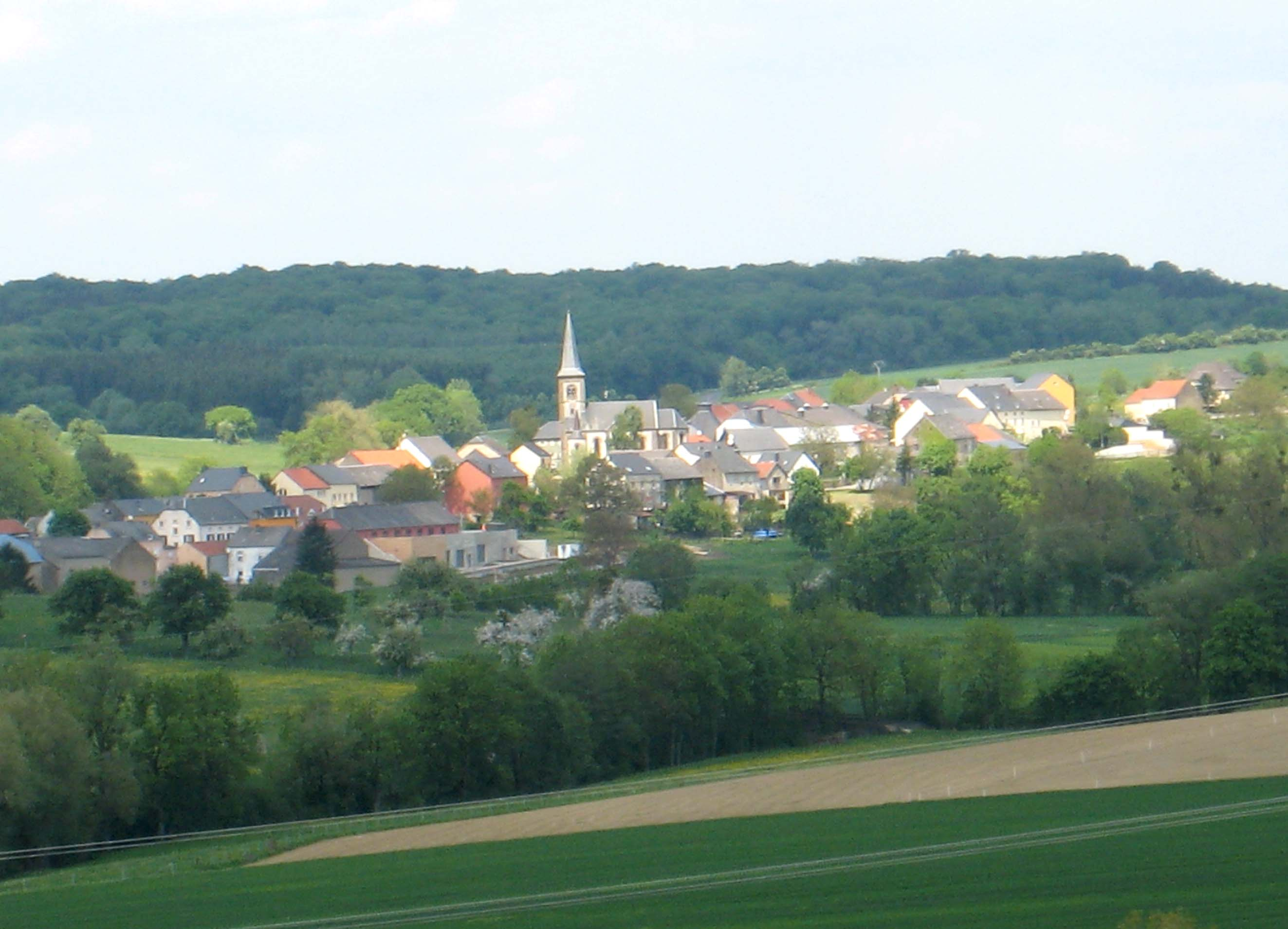
View of Herborn

Herborn (German pronunciation: [ˈhɛʁbɔʁn]; Luxembourgish: Hierber) is a village in the commune of Rosport-Mompach, in eastern Luxembourg. As of September 2026, the village had a population of 199.
