= Dickweiler =

Coordinates: 49°47′N 6°28′E

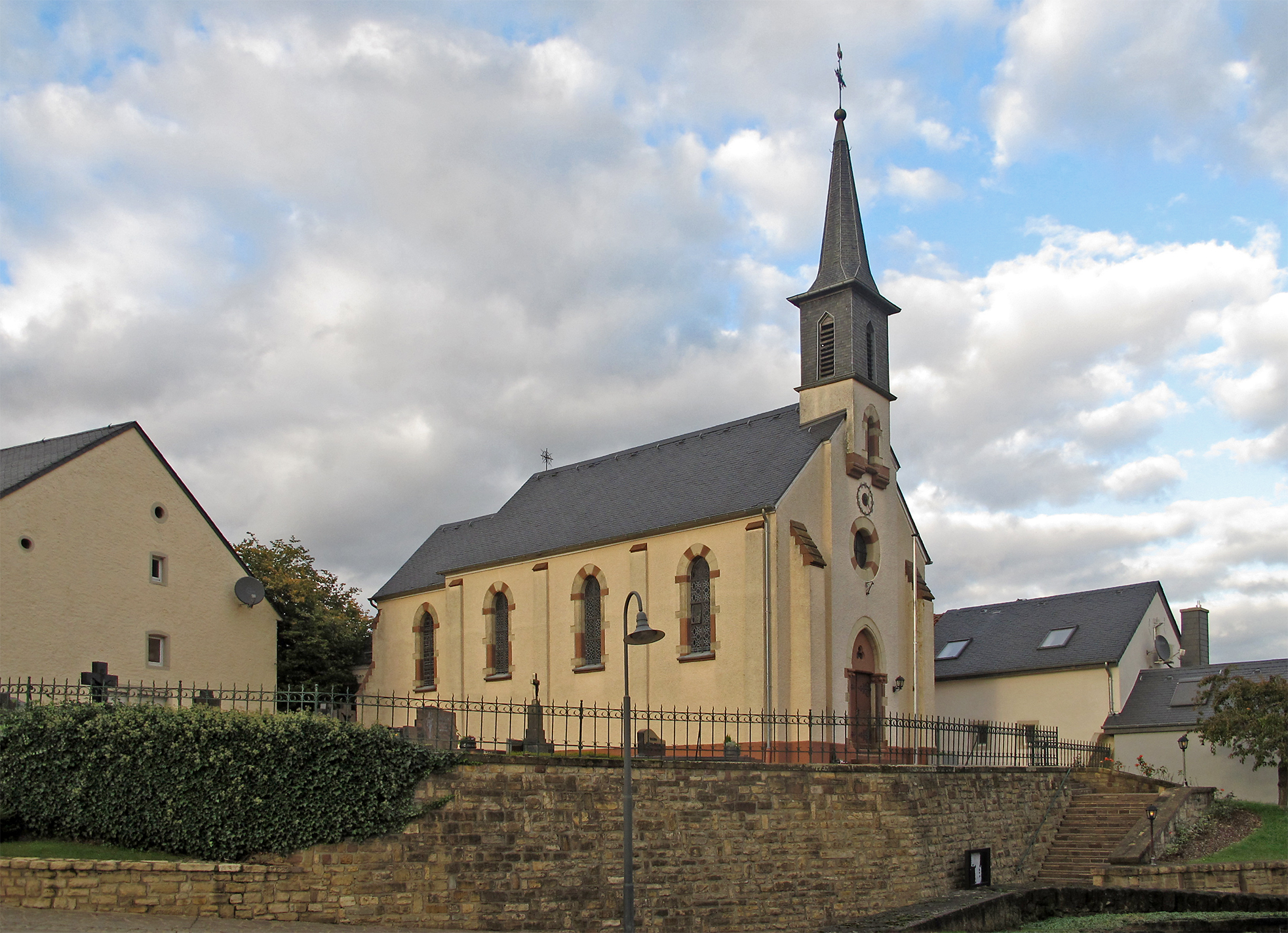
Church of Dickweiler, Luxembourg

Dickweiler (German pronunciation: [ˈdɪkvaɪlɐ]) is a village in the commune of Rosport-Mompach, in eastern Luxembourg. As of September 2026, the village has a population of 146.
