= Moersdorf =

Coordinates: 49°44′44″N 6°30′02″E

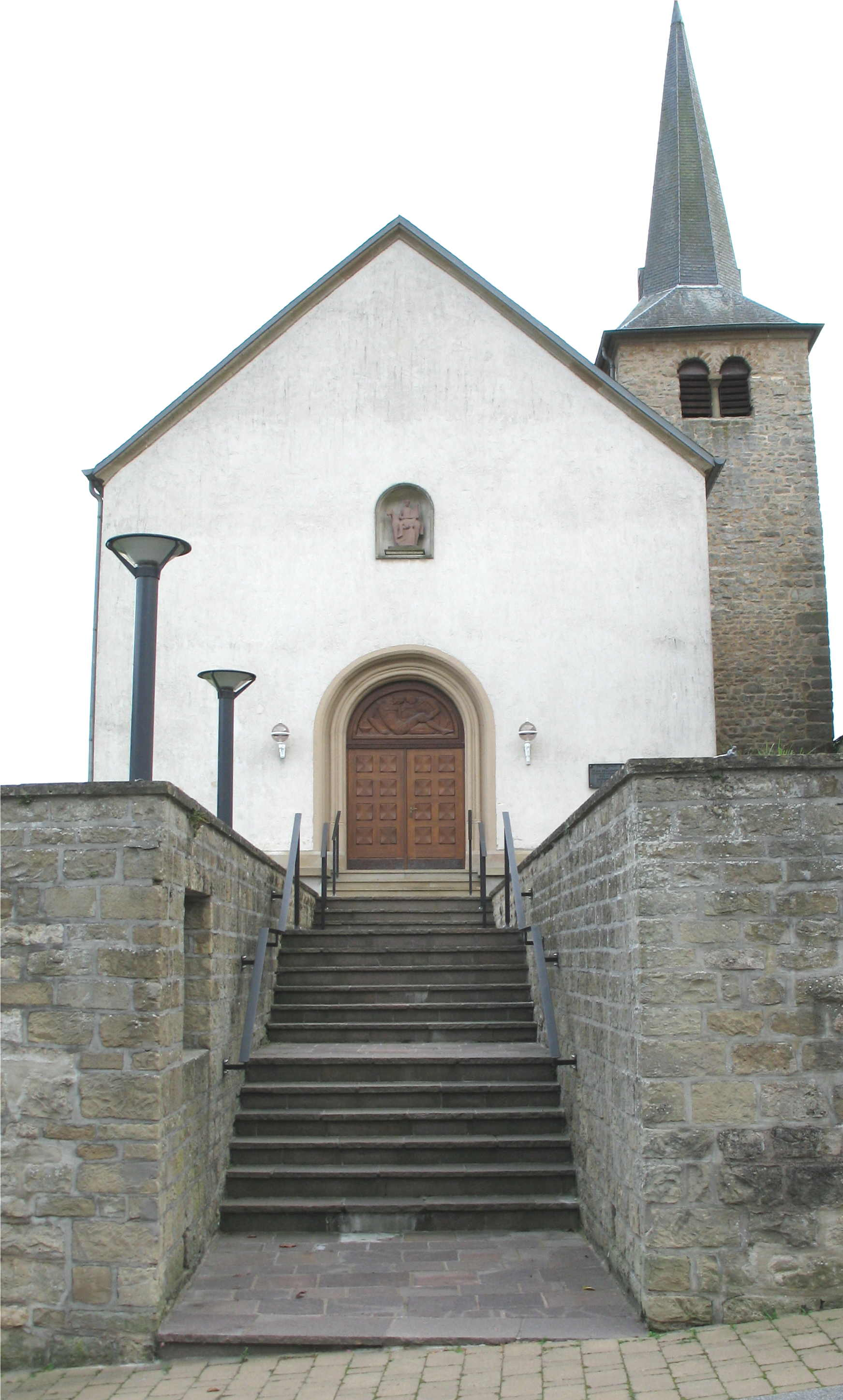

Moersdorf (Luxembourgish: Méischdref) is a small town in the commune of Rosport-Mompach, in eastern Luxembourg. As of September 2026, the town has a population of 534.
