= Osweiler, Luxembourg =

Town in the Luxembourgish commune of Rosport-Mompach

Coordinates: 49°47′N 6°26′E

Osweiler (Luxembourgish: Uesweller) is a town in the eastern Luxembourgish commune of Rosport-Mompach, with a population of 527 as of September 2026.
