= Hinkel =

Hinkel is a surname. Notable people with the surname include:

- Andreas Hinkel (born 1982), German footballer
- Arthur Hinkel (1916–1993), American electrical engineer
- Hans Hinkel (1901–1960), German journalist
- Roy Henkel (1905–1981), Canadian ice hockey player whose surname is often seen as "Hinkel"
- Volker Hinkel (born 1965), German guitarist and pianist, member of the band Fools Garden
- Adenoid Hynkel, villain of Charlie Chaplin's film The Great Dictator
