= Rosport-Mompach =

Rosport-Mompach Rouspert-Mompech (Luxembourgish)
- Commune
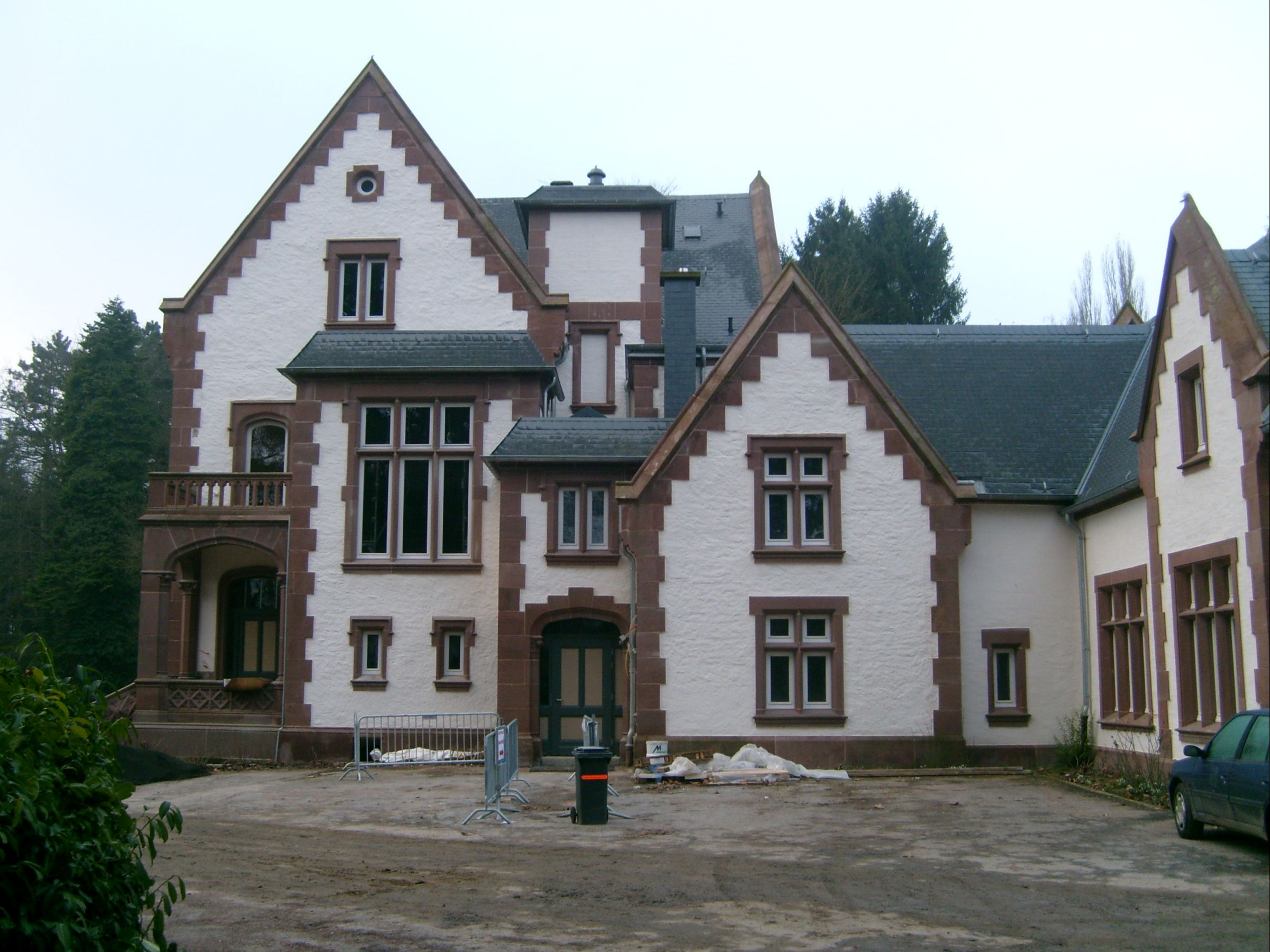
- The municipal house of Rosport, former home of Henri Tudor

- Map of Luxembourg with Rosport-Mompach highlighted in orange, and the canton in dark red
- Coordinates: 49.8°N 6.5°E
- Country: Luxembourg
- Canton: Echternach

Government
  - Mayor: Stéphanie Weydert

Area
  - Total: 57.07 km^{2} (22.03 sq mi)
  - Rank: 5th of 100
- Highest elevation: 399 m (1,309 ft)
  - Rank: 51st of 100
- Lowest elevation: 141 m (463 ft)
  - Rank: 5th of 100

Population (2025)
  - Total: 3,755
  - Rank: 48th of 100
  - Density: 65.80/km^{2} (170.4/sq mi)
  - Rank: 86th of 100
- Time zone: UTC+1 (CET)
  - Summer (DST): UTC+2 (CEST)
- LAU 2: LU0001006
- Website: www.rosportmompach.lu

Rosport-Mompach (Luxembourgish: Rouspert-Mompech) is a commune of Luxembourg located in the canton of Echternach.

== History ==
The commune was created on 1 January 2018 with the merging of the communes of Rosport and Mompach.

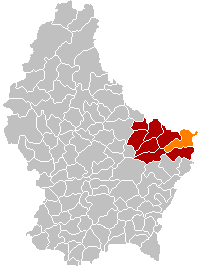
Rosport

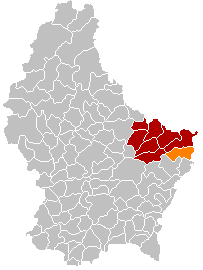
Mompach

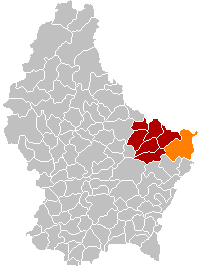
Rosport-Mompach

=== Populated places ===
The commune consists of the following villages:

Rosport Section:

- Dickweiler
- Girst
- Hinkel
- Osweiler
- Rosport
- Steinheim
- Frombuerg (lieu-dit)
- Girsterklaus (lieu-dit)

Mompach Section:

- Born
- Givenich
- Herborn
- Moersdorf
- Mompach
- Boursdorf (lieu-dit)
- Lilien (lieu-dit)

== Population ==
Historical population

Year	Pop.	±%
1821	2,208	—
1851	3,010	+36.3%
1900	2,980	−1.0%
1910	2,977	−0.1%
1922	2,865	−3.8%
1935	2,620	−8.6%

Year	Pop.	±%
1947	2,446	−6.6%
1960	2,232	−8.7%
1970	2,019	−9.5%
1981	2,139	+5.9%
1990	2,285	+6.8%
2000	2,683	+17.4%

Year	Pop.	±%
2005	2,924	+9.0%
2010	3,098	+6.0%
2015	3,383	+9.2%
2020	3,613	+6.8%
2021	3,631	+0.5%

Source data

== Economy ==
The commune forms part of the zone d'appellation of Crémant de Luxembourg.

The carbonated water factory Sources Rosport SA is located in Rosport.

The cider company Ramborn Co. is located in Born.

== Residents ==
- Henri Tudor (1859–1928), engineer
