= Steinheim, Luxembourg =

Coordinates: 49°49′N 6°29′E

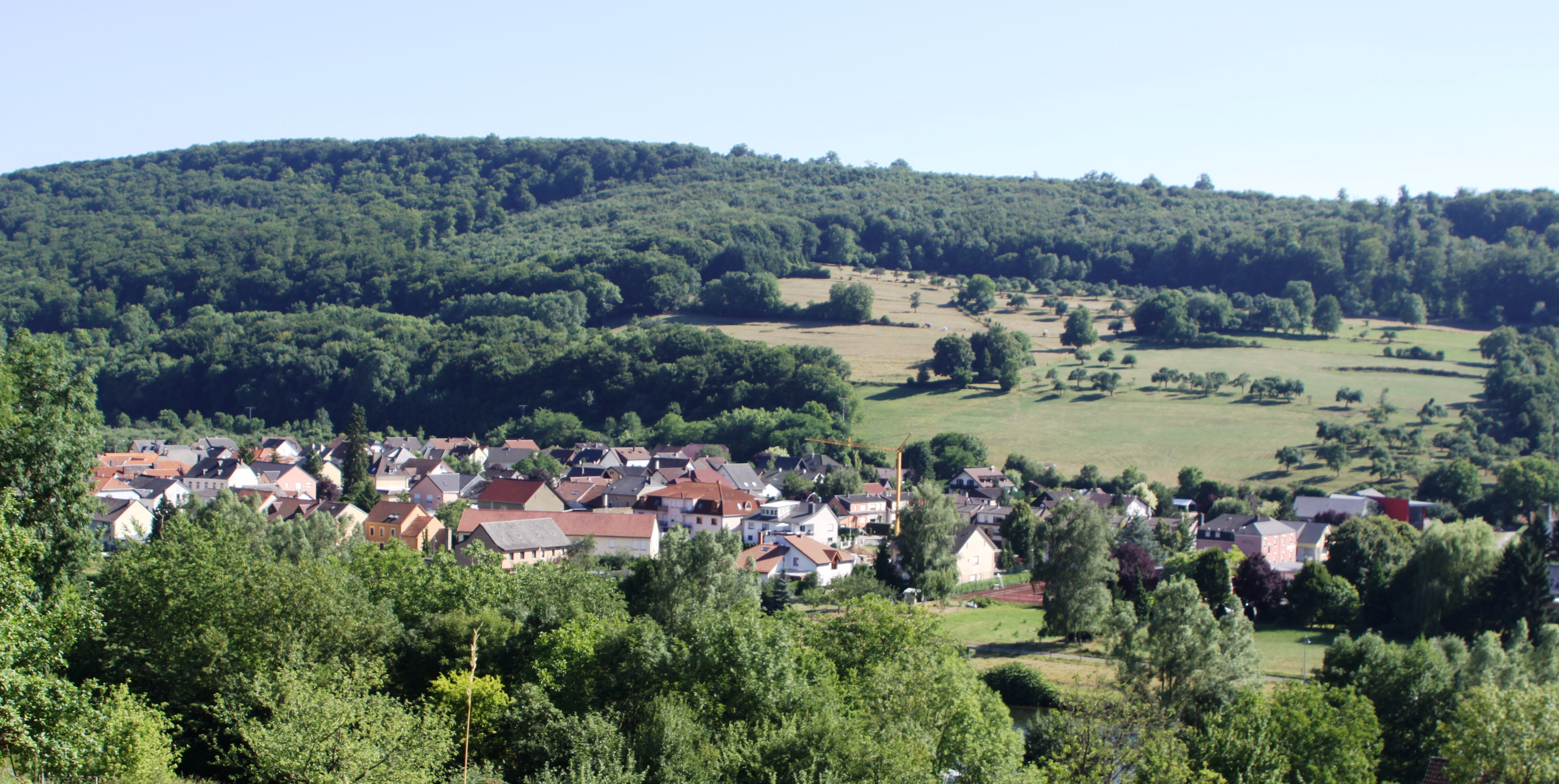
View of Steinheim, Luxembourg

Steinheim (German pronunciation: [ˈʃtaɪnhaɪm]; Luxembourgish: Steenem) is a town in the commune of Rosport-Mompach, in eastern Luxembourg. As of September 2026, the town has a population of 703.
