= Girst =

Coordinates: 49°46′N 6°30′E

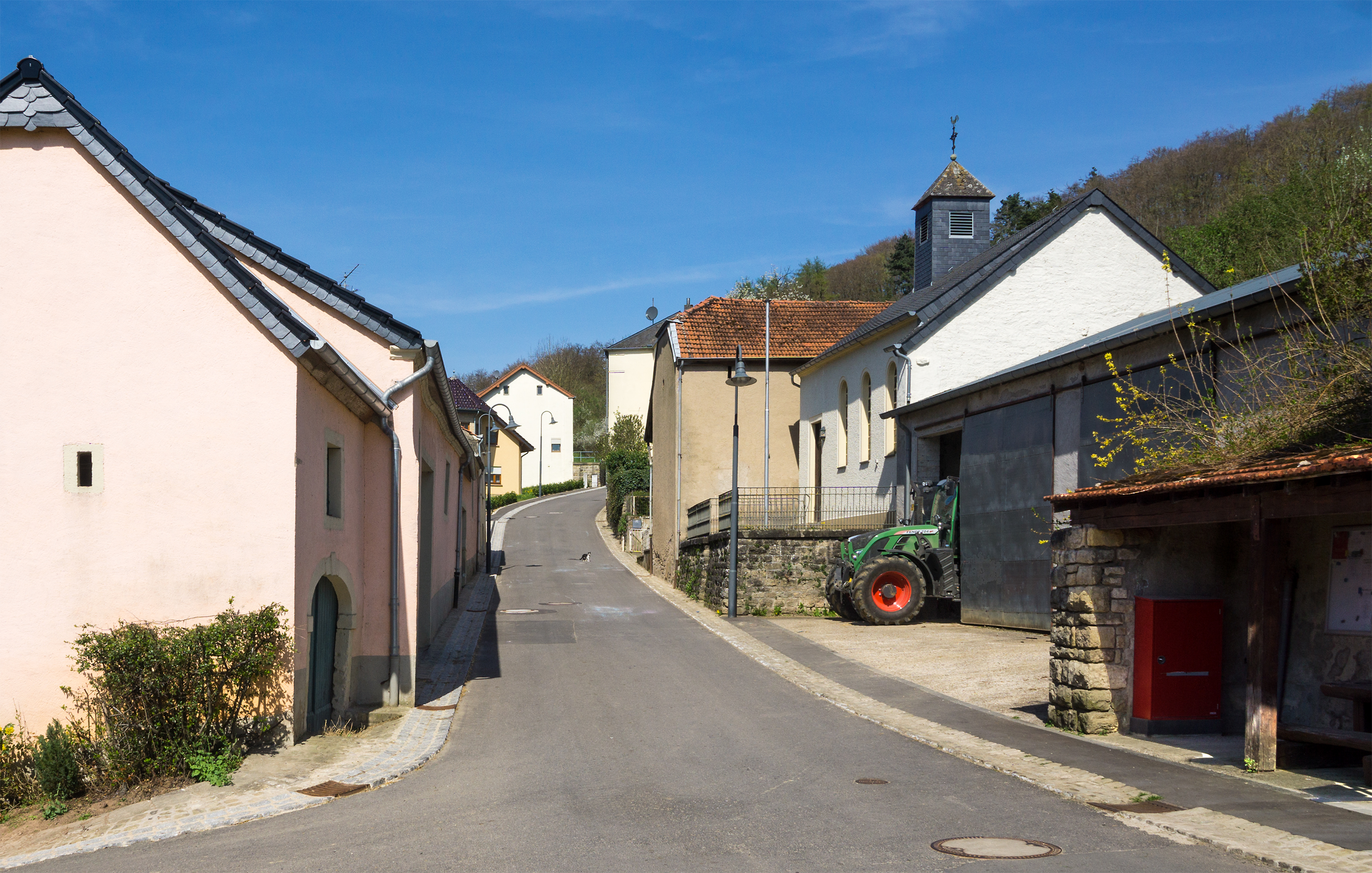
main street in Girst (2015).

Girst (German pronunciation: [ˈɡɪʁst]; Luxembourgish: Giischt) is a village in the commune of Rosport-Mompach, in eastern Luxembourg. As of September 2026, the village had a population of 102.
