= List of castles in Luxembourg =

By some optimistic estimates, there are as many as 130 castles in Luxembourg but more realistically there are probably just over a hundred, although many of these could be considered large residences or manor houses rather than castles.

The present list of castles in Luxembourg runs to about 50 and includes all the well-known fortresses and residential chateaux in the country. Below the main list, there is a sublist mentioning some of the other castles which may be included at a later date.

== Main list ==
Image	Name	Construction date	Location	Current state
	Ansembourg Castle	1135	Ansembourg	Privately owned, no visitors
	New Castle of Ansembourg	1639	Ansembourg	Privately owned, renovated, gardens open to the public
	Aspelt Castle	1590	Aspelt	Undergoing restoration
	Beaufort Castle	11th century	Beaufort	Ruin, open to visitors
	Beggen Castle	1895	Dommeldange	Now Russian Embassy
	Berg Castle	1911	Colmar-Berg	Grand-ducal residence
	Bettange-sur-Mess Castle	1753	Bettange-sur-Mess	Rehabilitation centre for mentally handicapped persons
	Bettembourg Castle	1733	Bettembourg	Town hall of Bettembourg
	Bettendorf Castle	1728	Bettendorf	Privately owned, no visitors
	Betzdorf Castle	17th century	Betzdorf	Owned by SES communications, no visitors
	Birtrange Castle	13th century	Schierenermillen	Privately owned
	Born Castle	18th century	Born, Luxembourg	Privately owned
	Bourglinster Castle	11th century	Bourglinster	Hotel and conference centre
	Bourscheid Castle	1095	Bourscheid	Partly restored, open to visitors
	Brandenbourg Castle	13th century	Brandenbourg	Ruin, no longer open to visitors
	Clemency Castle	1665	Clemency, SW Luxembourg	Fully restored, occasionally open to visitors
	Clervaux Castle	12th century	Clervaux	Fully restored, open to visitors
	Colpach Castle	18th century	Colpach-Bas	Convalescent centre
	Differdange Castle	1577	Differdange	Miami University
	Dommeldange Castle	17th century	Dommeldange	Chinese Embassy
	Dudelange Castle	15th century	Mont St. Jean, Luxembourg	Now just a ruin
	Erpeldange Castle	1630	Erpeldange	Commune offices
	Esch-sur-Sûre Castle	13th century	Esch-sur-Sûre	Ruins, site open to visitors
	Fischbach Castle	17th century	Fischbach	Grand-ducal residence
	Grand Ducal Palace, Luxembourg	1572	Luxembourg City	Grand-ducal palace
	Heisdorf Castle	19th century	Heisdorf	Old people's home
	Hesperange Castle	13th century	Hesperange	Ruin, privately owned, not accessible
	Hollenfels Castle	11th century	Hollenfels	Educational centre for young people
	Koerich Castle	13th century	Koerich	Ruins, site open to visitors
	La Fontaine Castle	1563	Clausen, Luxembourg City	Today almost nothing remains of the former palace
	Larochette Castle	11th century	Larochette	Open to the public in summer
	Lucilinburugh	963	Luxembourg Bock	Only ruins, Open to the public
	Mamer Castle	1830	Mamer	Town hall and communal offices
	Mersch Castle	16th century	Mersch	Commune's administration, site can be visited
	Meysembourg Castle	1880	Near Larochette	Privately owned, no visitors
	Munsbach Castle	1775	Munsbach	Educational institution
	Pettingen Castle	16th century	Pettingen	Ruin, open to the public
	Rosport Castle	1892	Rosport	Museum open to the public
	Sanem Castle	1557	Sanem	Children's home
	Schengen Castle	19th century	Schengen	Hotel and convention centre
	Schoenfels Castle	17th century	Schoenfels	Site open to the public
	Schuttbourg Castle	1404	Near Kautenbach	Privately owned, no visitors
	Schauwenburg Castle	16th century	Bertrange	Town hall and communal offices
	Senningen Castle	1750	Near Niederanven	Governmental conference centre, no visitors
	Septfontaines Castle	13th century	Septfontaines	Privately owned, no visitors
	Septfontaines, Rollingergrund	1775	Luxembourg City	Convention centre
	Stadtbredimus Castle	1724	Stadtbredimus	Wine cooperative
	Stolzembourg Castle	1898	Stolzembourg	Privately owned, no visitors
	Urspelt Castle	1860	near Clervaux	Hotel
	Useldange Castle	12th century	Useldange	Ruins open to the public
	Vianden Castle	Mainly 11th to 14th century	Vianden	Fully restored, open to the public throughout the year
	Walferdange Castle	1824	Walferdange	University of Luxembourg
	Wiltz Castle	1727	Wiltz	school
	Wintrange Castle	1610	Wintrange	Privately owned, Event venue. National Historic Monument.

== Sublist ==
This is a list of less important castles or castles which are not yet covered by articles in the English Wikipedia.

- Belenhaff in Junglinster (converted to a golf course and clubhouse)
- Berlaymont Castle in Clervaux (small 12th-century castle rebuilt 1635, now a hotel)
- Birtrange Castle near Schieren (privately owned)
- Ell Castle near Redange (once a minor fort, now used for agricultural activities)
- Heringen in the Mullerthal (an unimpressive ruin)
- Kockelscheuer Castle just south of Luxembourg City (19th century private residence)
- Mertert Castle near Wasserbillig (built in the 1870s, offers accommodation)
- Moestroff Castle near Bettendorf in eastern Luxembourg (dates from 1433, privately owned)
- Schorels Castle near Eschette (only remnants of walls remain)
- Schrassig Castle, now demolished dated from the 17th century
- Syrdall Castle
