= Luxembourg School of Business =

Graduate business school

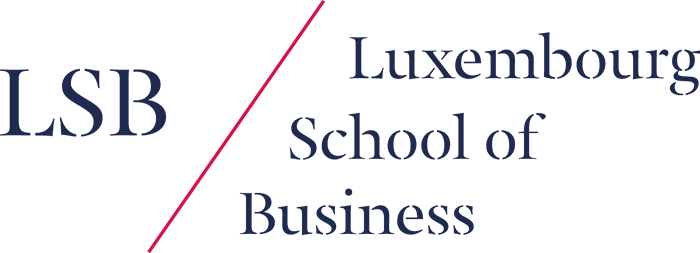
- Type: Private business school
- Established: 2014
- Dean: Prof. Dr. Patrick Vanhoudt
- Location: Luxembourg; 49°36′25.338″N 6°6′29.278″E
- Website: www.luxsb.lu

The Luxembourg School of Business (LSB) is the first graduate business school in Luxembourg, delivering high-quality management education. LSB offers five accredited degree programs:

- a part-time Master in Business Administration (Weekend MBA) (60 ECTS)

- Full-time MBA (60 ECTS)

- Master in Management (120 ECTS)

- Master in International Finance (120 ECTS) and

- Bachelor in International Business (180 ECTS).

Founded in 2014, it is the first business school in Luxembourg which had to meet the requirements of the new legal framework put in place in 2016, focused on raising the quality standards. LSB is accredited by the Luxembourg Ministry of Higher Education and Research via a ministerial decree dated as of 29 August 2017 for the duration of five years.

Also accredited as a training provider inside the Lifelong Learning initiative of the L'Institut national pour le développement de la formation professionnelle continue of Luxembourg. LSB holds Erasmus accreditation for the period of 2021 – 2027.

== Campus ==
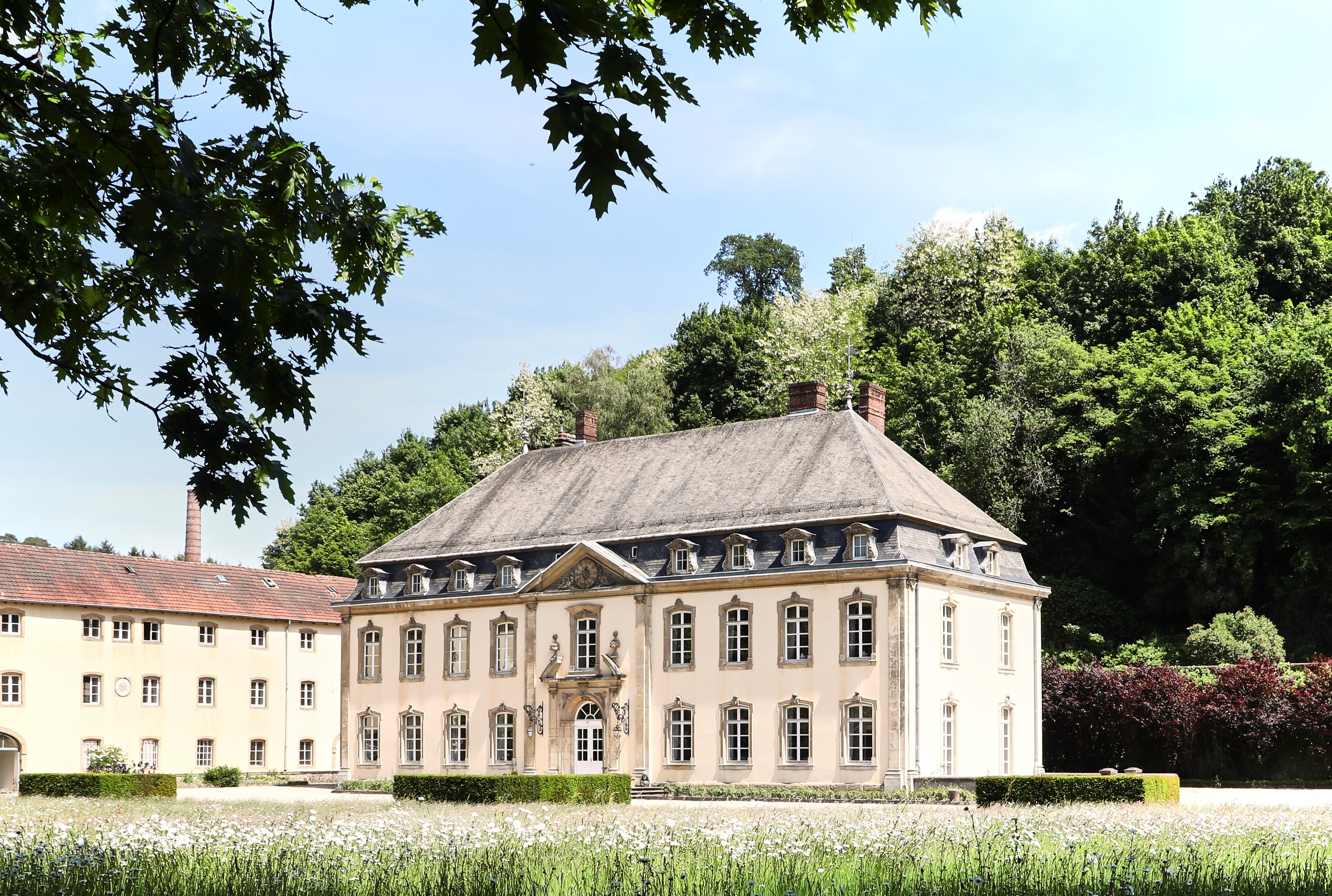
Château de Septfontaines

The Luxembourg School of Business campus is located at the Château de Septfontaines and the former porcelain manufactory Faïencerie Villeroy & Boch, a historical area close to the center of Luxembourg City.

== Faculty ==
LSB Faculty Members cooperate with business schools and universities around the world.
