= Dudelange Castle =

Luxembourg Castle Ruins

Coordinates: 49.49046°N 6.06033°E

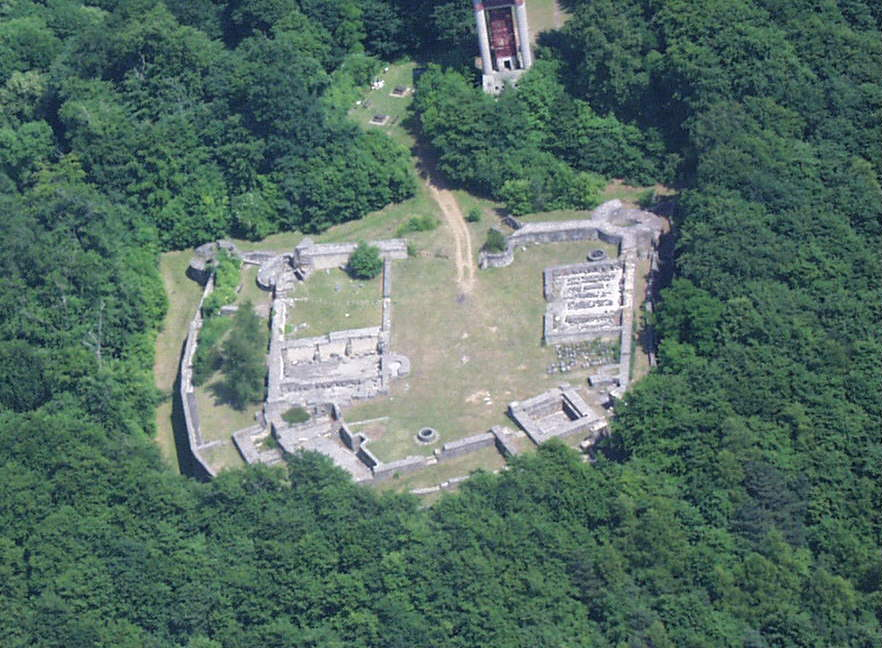
Aerial photograph of the site

The ruins of Dudelange Castle (Luxembourgish: Buerg um Gehaansbierg; French: Château de Dudelange) are located on Mont St Jean, a forested hill to the west of Dudelange in the south of Luxembourg. The castle was completed in the early 16th century but was destroyed in 1552.

== History ==
While the site of the ruins bears traces of Gallo-Roman structures, the first evidence of a castle in the area is in Dudelange itself where a castle belonging to the Lords of Gymnich was destroyed around 1400 by Robert de Bar. At the beginning of the 15th century, work began on building a fortified castle which was completed early in the 16th century with Gothic and Renaissance influences. The finely cut stones and sculptures show how much the lords of Gynmich, Boulay, Neufchâtel, Hunolstein and Isembourg invested in their luxurious fortress. However from 1542 the castle was taken and retaken when Francis I and Henry II of France were at war with Emperor Charles V. In 1552, the castle was destroyed and deprived of any strategic value. Thereafter the ruins were used as a quarry for the surrounding villages.

Since the 1970s, the Amis de l’Histoire de Dudelange et du Mont Saint-Jean (Friends of the History of Dudelange and Mont St. Jean) have explored the ruins, discovering the foundations of several towers, the palace, living quarters, stables and outhouses. Three wells and a reservoir were partly unearthed. The ditches and the entrance to the castle can still be seen.

== See also ==
- List of castles in Luxembourg
