= Mont-Saint-Jean =

Mont-Saint-Jean may refer to several places:

Several French communes.

- Mont-Saint-Jean, Aisne
- Mont-Saint-Jean, Côte-d'Or
- Mont-Saint-Jean, Sarthe

== Other ==
- Mont-Saint-Jean, Belgium the name of a hamlet in Wallonia on the reverse slope of the escarpment where the Battle of Waterloo was fought and is one of the French names for the battle (bataille de Mont Saint-Jean)
- Mont St. Jean, Luxembourg is a hill, castle, and religious site in the commune of Dudelange, in southern Luxembourg. The summit is at 417 metres.
