= Bettange-sur-Mess Castle =

Building in Luxembourg

Coordinates: 49°34′32″N 5°58′57″E

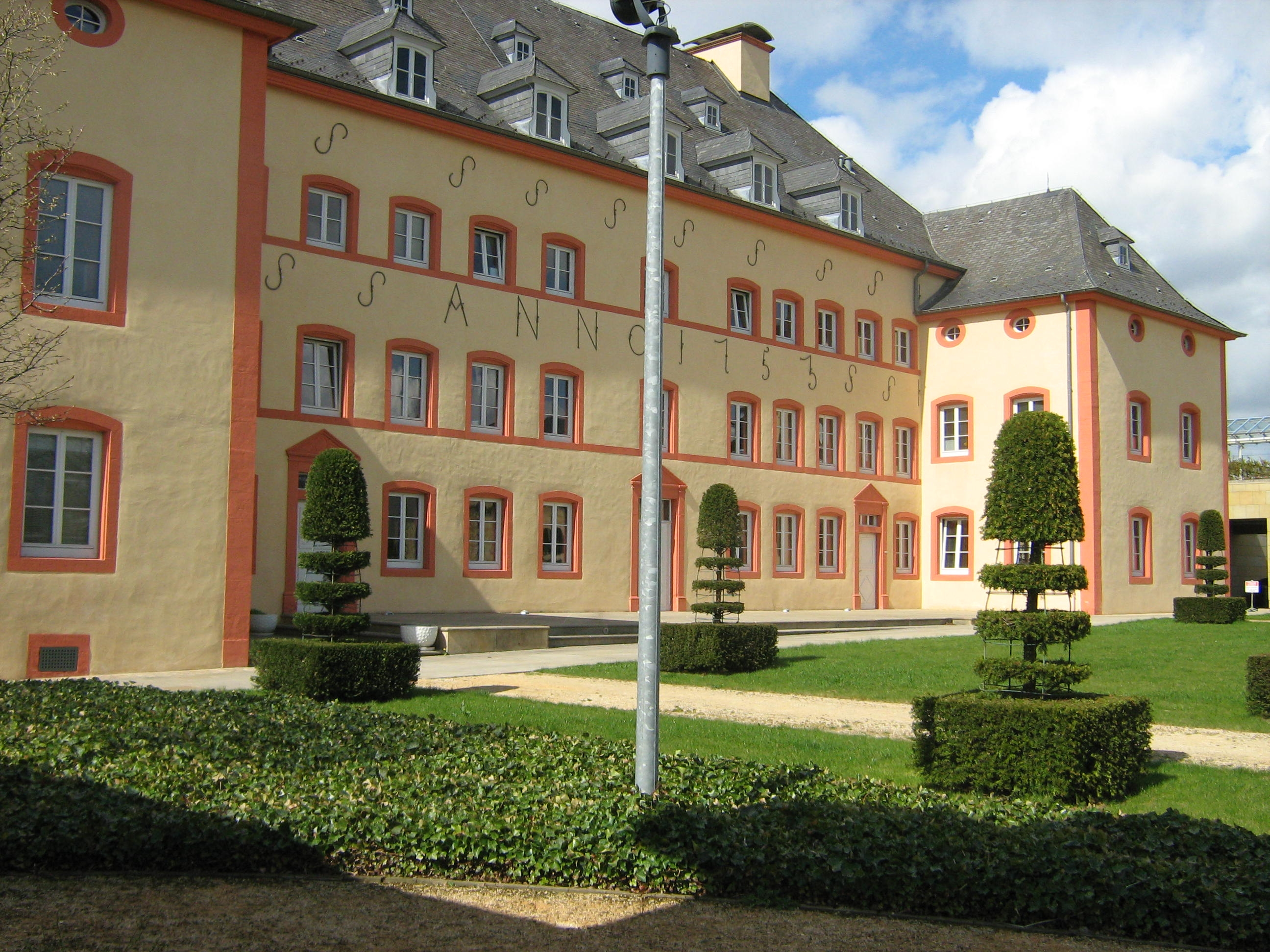
Bettange-sur-Mess Castle

Bettange-sur-Mess Castle (Luxembourgish: Bettenger Schlass; French: Château de Bettange-sur-Mess) is located in the village of Bettange-sur-Mess near Dippach in the southwest of Luxembourg. Built in 1753 by René Louis de Geisen, the castle has changed ownership several times. Since 1996, it has been a retraining centre for learning disabled persons run by the Association des Parents d’Enfants Mentalement Handicapés.

== See also ==
- List of castles in Luxembourg
