= Vieux Luxembourg =

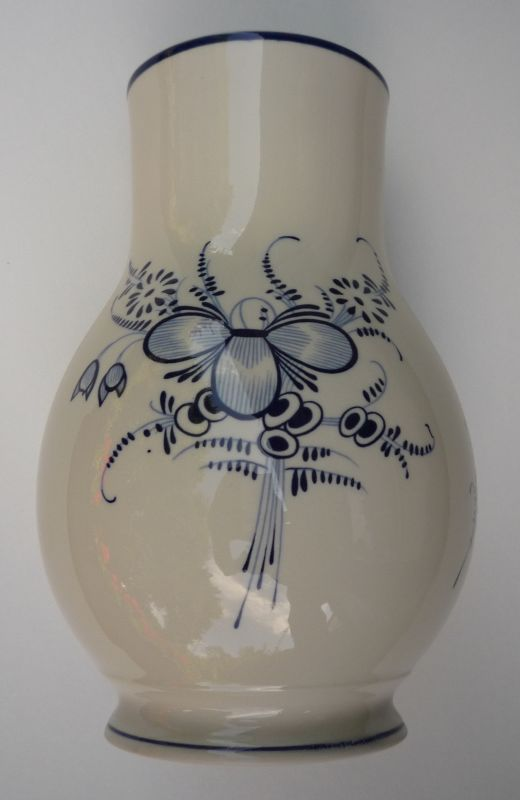
Vase with the Vieux Luxembourg decor

Vieux Luxembourg is a porcelain design used by Villeroy & Boch. One of the oldest European porcelain manufacturers, Villeroy & Boch’s first pattern, Vieux Luxembourg is still in production.

Villeroy and Boch’s Vieux Luxembourg is reminiscent of the designs that were imported from the Orient during the 16th and 17th centuries. The porcelain body of Vieux Luxembourg is accented with a scalloped rim and cobalt blue trim. Floral sprays are spread across the body of each piece.

For Villeroy & Boch, that step was the establishment of a pottery in Audun-le-Tiche, Lorraine on April 1, 1748 their first pattern, Vieux Luxembourg. Just a few decades later, the enterprise counted among the finest of European craftsmen, acclaimed as “Francois Boch et Freres, Manufacture Imperiale et Royale” in a place named Septfontaines (Luxembourgish: Siwebueren), in today's Rollingergrund neighbourhood of Luxembourg city.
