= Moestroff =

Coordinates: 49°52′N 6°14′E

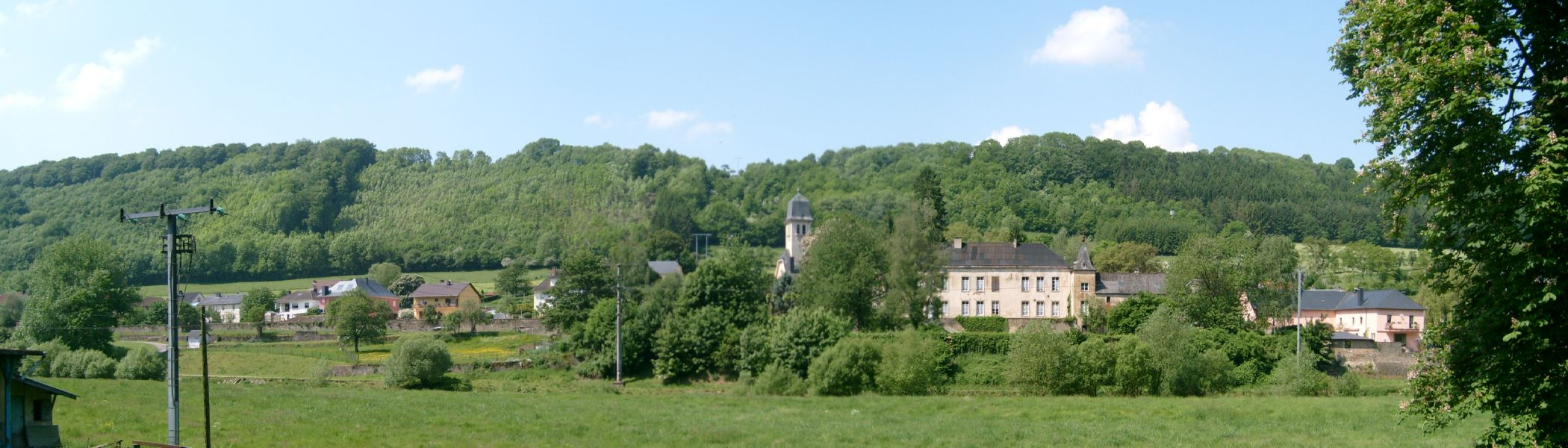
Moestroff Panorama

Moestroff (Luxembourgish: Méischtref) is a small town in the commune of Bettendorf, in north-eastern Luxembourg. As of September 2026, the town has a population of 541.
