= Tessy Antony de Nassau =

Luxembourgish businesswoman (born 1985)

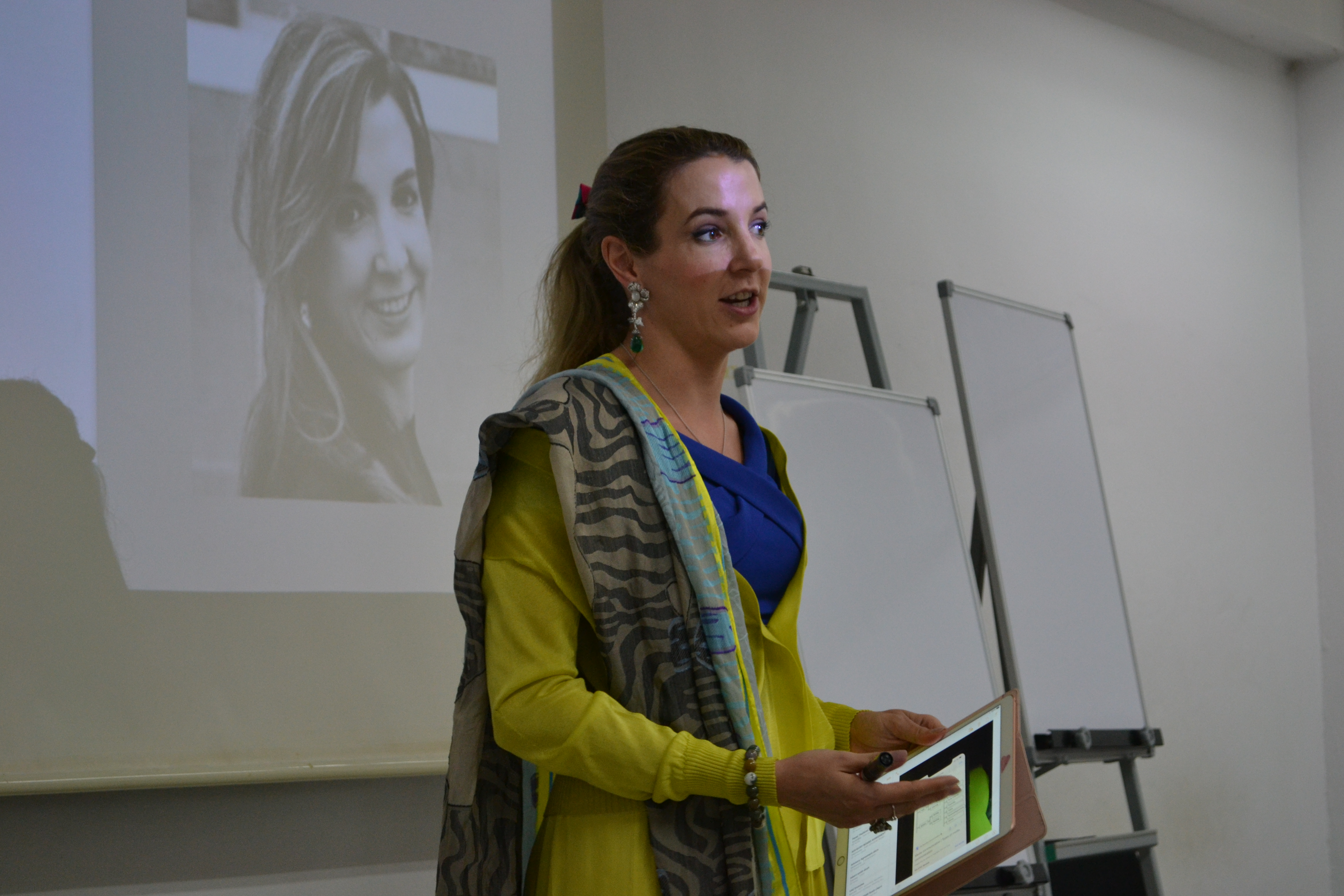
- Antony de Nassau in 2019
- Born: Tessy Antony; 28 October 1985 (age 40); Luxembourg City, Luxembourg
- Occupations: Businesswoman; soldier
- Spouses: Prince Louis of Luxembourg (m. 2006; div. 2019) Frank Floessel (m. 2021)
- Children: 3

Tessy Antony de Nassau (née Antony; born 28 October 1985), formerly Princess Tessy of Luxembourg, is a Luxembourgish businesswoman and non-profit executive. She is a former member of the Grand Ducal Family of Luxembourg as the ex-wife of Prince Louis of Luxembourg, the third son of Henri, Grand Duke of Luxembourg. She married Prince Louis in 2006, and they have two sons. In January 2017, they announced their separation and intent to divorce, with divorce proceedings occurring in London. Their divorce was finalized on 4 April 2019, at which point Antony de Nassau lost her titles of princess of Luxembourg, of Bourbon-Parma, and of Nassau.

== Early life ==
Tessy Antony was born on 28 October 1985 in Luxembourg City, the daughter of François Antony and Régine Anne Heidemann. She has one older sister and three brothers. One of her older brothers died shortly after his birth.

After attending a technical high school in Pétange, (south of Luxembourg City), Antony and her twin brother Ronny joined the Luxembourg Army at the age of 18, eventually rising to the rank of Corporal. From March to July 2004, she took part in a mission in Yugoslavia, as Sdt 1cl Chauffeur C2, in Mitrovica within KFOR, the NATO peacekeeping force in Kosovo. She is fluent in Luxembourgish, French, English, and German. She took lessons at a music school in Differdange and plays the alto saxophone.

== Further education ==
Antony de Nassau studied at Richmond, The American International University in London in 2011 where she obtained a BA (Hons) degree in International Relations in 2014. She wrote her thesis on the rise of nationalism in Europe, using the example of the Greek far-right party Golden Dawn. Additionally, from 2005 to 2009, Antony de Nassau attended several trainings and lectures relating to the topics of "Education and psychology." She earned her MA degree in International Studies and Diplomacy from SOAS, University of London in 2015. She further has a Doctorate in integrative medicine (IMD) and is a PhD candidate at Quantum University, an institution offering online degrees in pseudoscience and alternative medicine.

== Career ==
In 2016, Antony de Nassau co-founded Professors Without Borders, an NGO specializing in international educational efforts, and is currently its Director of Logistics. She currently works as founder and partner for Finding Butterflies Consulting, a consulting service focused on corporate social responsibility projects in education and female empowerment.

== Marriages and family ==
=== Marriage to Prince Louis of Luxembourg ===
Antony met Prince Louis for the first time while he was a member of the army.

On 12 March 2006, Antony gave birth to a boy, christened Gabriel Michael Louis Ronny de Nassau, who was born at a private Swiss hospital, Clinic des Grangettes, in Geneva. The baby was the first grandchild for Grand Duke Henri and Grand Duchess Maria Teresa.

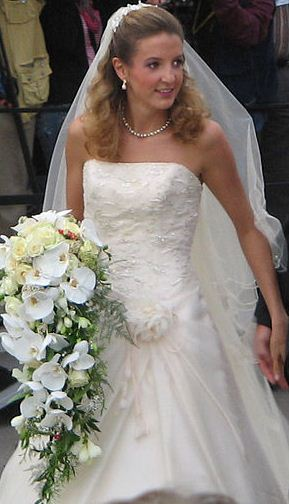
Antony on her wedding day

The couple married on 29 September 2006 at a parish church in Gilsdorf. Upon their marriage, Prince Louis gave up succession rights for himself and his descendants, but retained the title of Prince of Luxembourg and the style of Royal Highness. The couple's second son, Noah Etienne Guillaume Gabriel Matthias Xavier de Nassau, was born on 21 September 2007 at Grand Duchess Charlotte Maternity Hospital. The couple's sons were initially given the surname de Nassau with no titles.

On Luxembourg's National Day on 23 June 2009, a decree was issued granting Tessy the title of Princess of Luxembourg and Princess of Bourbon-Parma with the style Her Royal Highness. The same decree gave the title Prince of Nassau and style Royal Highness to her and Louis' sons Gabriel and Noah and possible future children. In 2012, Princess Tessy received the Order of Civil and Military Merit of Adolph of Nassau. The decree granting Tessy de Nassau the rank of Princess of Luxembourg was, however, unlike previous decrees conferring titles, not made transparent to the public.

On 18 January 2017, the Grand Ducal Court announced the separation of the Prince and Princess, and their intention to divorce, whereupon Princess Tessy lost her Grand Ducal titles. However, Articles 1 and 4 of the 1995 Grand Ducal Decree (as amended) state:

Article 1. In the public and private acts which concern them, the Princes and Princesses born in the first degree of descent from the Sovereign shall bear the style of 'Royal Highness' before their given name and the surname '(de) Nassau' and shall bear the title of 'Prince or Princess of Luxembourg' following their given and surnames. Children of the heir presumptive shall be designated in the same manner... Article 4. In the event of separation of bed and board, of divorce or remarriage after spousal death, the titles enjoyed by consorts of the Princes of Our House in accordance with the present decree shall be lost forthwith.

The divorce proceedings occurred in London, and the divorce was finalized on 4 April 2019.

=== Marriage to Frank Floessel ===
On 31 December 2020, Antony de Nassau announced her engagement to Swiss businessman Frank Floessel on social media. They married on 23 July 2021 in Zürich, Switzerland. She gave birth to a son, Theodor Frank on 26 August 2021. He is Antony de Nassau's third and Floessel's second child.

== Activities ==
In April 2016, Antony de Nassau was awarded the Mrongovius Medal for humanitarian involvement.

Since 2015, Antony de Nassau has been UNAIDS Global Advocate for Young Women and Adolescent Girls. She is involved in charities and NGOs acting in favour of people with specific needs. She actively takes part in charitable events in Luxembourg as well as in London. She has been an active member of the Luxembourg "Groupe de Support Psychologique" (GSP) for the past five years.

Antony de Nassau became an ambassador for Shongolulu. The company, based in San Diego, California, donates a percentage of their profit to support Wildlife Alliance.

== Hobbies ==
A keen sportsperson, Antony de Nassau regularly practises the following sports: swimming, spinning, hiking, pilates, scuba diving, skiing and hunting. She is a member of the Niederkorn Fanfare. She likes classic and contemporary music and is particularly interested in jazz. She regularly attends conferences and seminars on psychology and social development, topics she also enjoys reading about most.

== Honours and awards ==
=== National honours ===
- Luxembourg:
  - Grand Cross of the Order of Adolphe of Nassau (2012).

=== Foreign honours ===
- Knight of the Order of Lafayette (21 September 2019).
- Dame Grand Cross of the Royal Order of the Drum (23 October 2019).

=== Awards ===
Honorary degrees

- Honorary Doctor of Fine Arts (DFA) from the Paris College of Art (16 May 2019).

Others

- Luxembourg Leadership Academy's Leader of the Year Award (9 September 2019).
- 2024 Sino-Phil Asia International Peace Award (16 February 2024).
