= Wintrange Castle =

Coordinates: 49°30′08″N 6°21′14″E

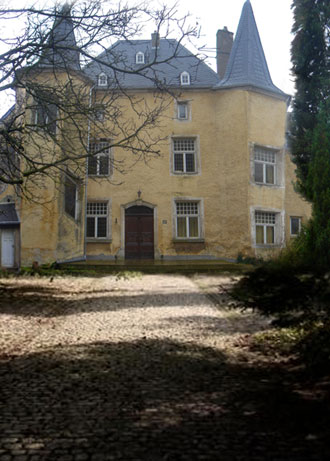
Wintrange Castle

Wintrange Castle (Luxembourgish: Schlass Wëntreng; French: Château de Wintrange; German: Schloss Wintringen), located in the centre of Wintrange near Schengen in south-eastern Luxembourg, is a privately owned Renaissance style castle built in 1610 and can be rented for weddings, events, film, and photo location.

== Location ==
The castle is a historic landmark in the Moselle valley and is surrounded by a 1.5-hectare (3.7-acre) private park. Adjacent to the estate is the Haff Remich bird sanctuary and national park with lakes and ponds stretching down to the river.

== History ==
Named as one of the most beautiful private castles in the Luxembourg region in Hémecht, Château de Wintrange carries a long history of Nobles and Lords. Built in 1610 by Alexandre de Musset, Sire of Foetz, it has changed family ownership 18 times. The name Wintrange has first been documented in writings in 987 AD, although the area has been inhabited for several millennia. The Romans were the first to cultivate vineyards in the fertile soil of the river Valley. Remains of Roman villas have been excavated in the area.

Located in the picturesque Mosel river valley, Château de Wintrange is the historic monument of the village of Wintrange. The castle was built with its own well system, waterways, a walled park and own vineyards. The surrounding property was much larger in the 1600s than today, then being tended by servants. The main building structure with its four towers hasn’t changed in the past four centuries. In the 30-year war (1618-1648) some fortifications were added, as well as a gunport to protect the main entrance. In the 18th century, the annexed barn with the 5th tower was built as an interconnected extension. It was mainly used as horse stables.

In the 1930s, iron ore mining Industrial Nick Schlesser hunted game in the lush forests above the village and fell in love with this little jewel of a castle in the valley. Previously owned by Gisbert de Witt, who cultivated the park into an orchard, the Château de Wintrange was sold in 1938 by Notary Champagne to Nicolas Schlesser.

Today, Château de Wintrange is still privately owned and carefully restored by Nick's grandson Philippe. The castle and park can be rented for events, weddings, film and photo shoots.

== The castle today ==
The castle is privately owned and can be rented for weddings, events, film, and photo location, but is not yet open to tourists or guided tours. It was bought by the Tolen family and is currently in their private ownership.

== See also ==
- List of castles in Luxembourg
