= Dommeldange Castle =

Castle in Dommeldange, Luxembourg

Coordinates: 49°38′12″N 06°08′39″E

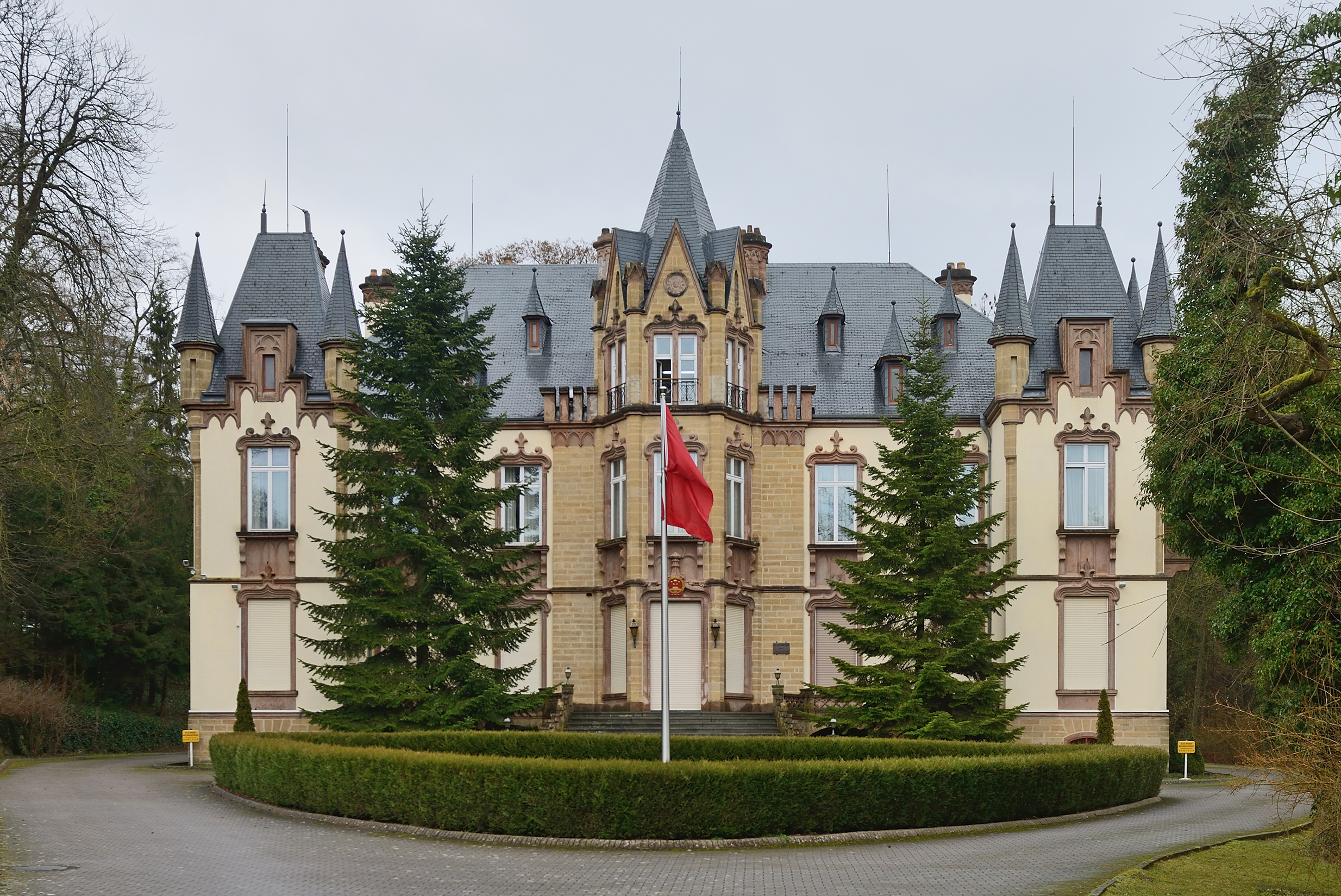
Dommeldange Castle.

Dommeldange Castle (French: Château de Dommeldange; Luxembourgish: Schlass Dummeldeng) is located in Dommeldange, the northernmost district of Luxembourg City in the Grand Duchy of Luxembourg. Initially a private residence built for the owner of the local iron works, it is now the Embassy of the People's Republic of China.

== History ==
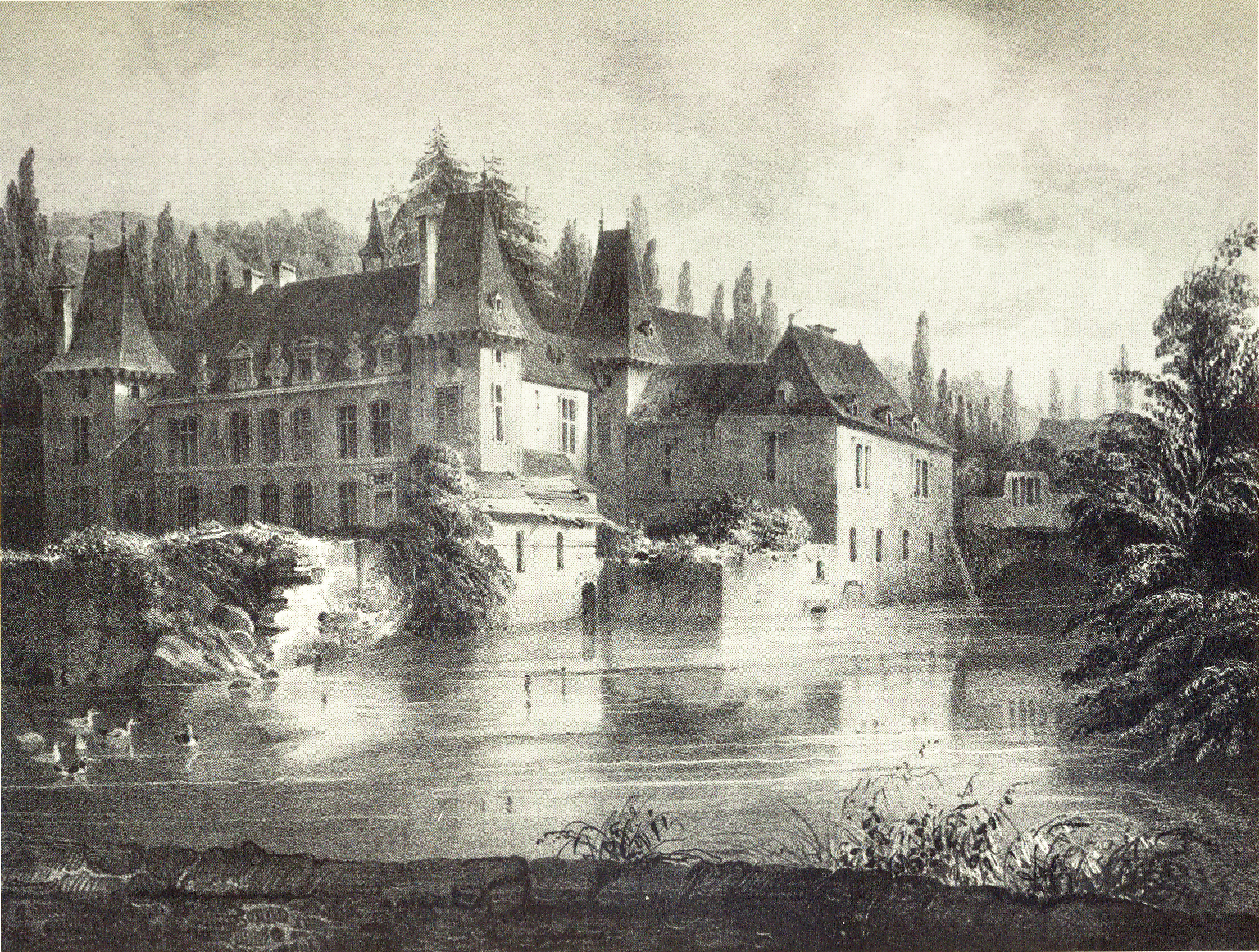
Historic drawing by Nicolas Liez (1834).

The castle appears to have been built in the 17th century by Thomas Marchant, a forge operator, as a private residence. In 1870, Charles Collart, also a forge operator, lived there. In 1973, the castle was bought by the State of Luxembourg. It now houses the residence and headquarters of the Chinese Embassy.

== See also ==
- List of castles in Luxembourg
