= Heisdorf Castle =

Castle in Heisdorf, Luxembourg

Coordinates: 49°40′31″N 6°09′00″E

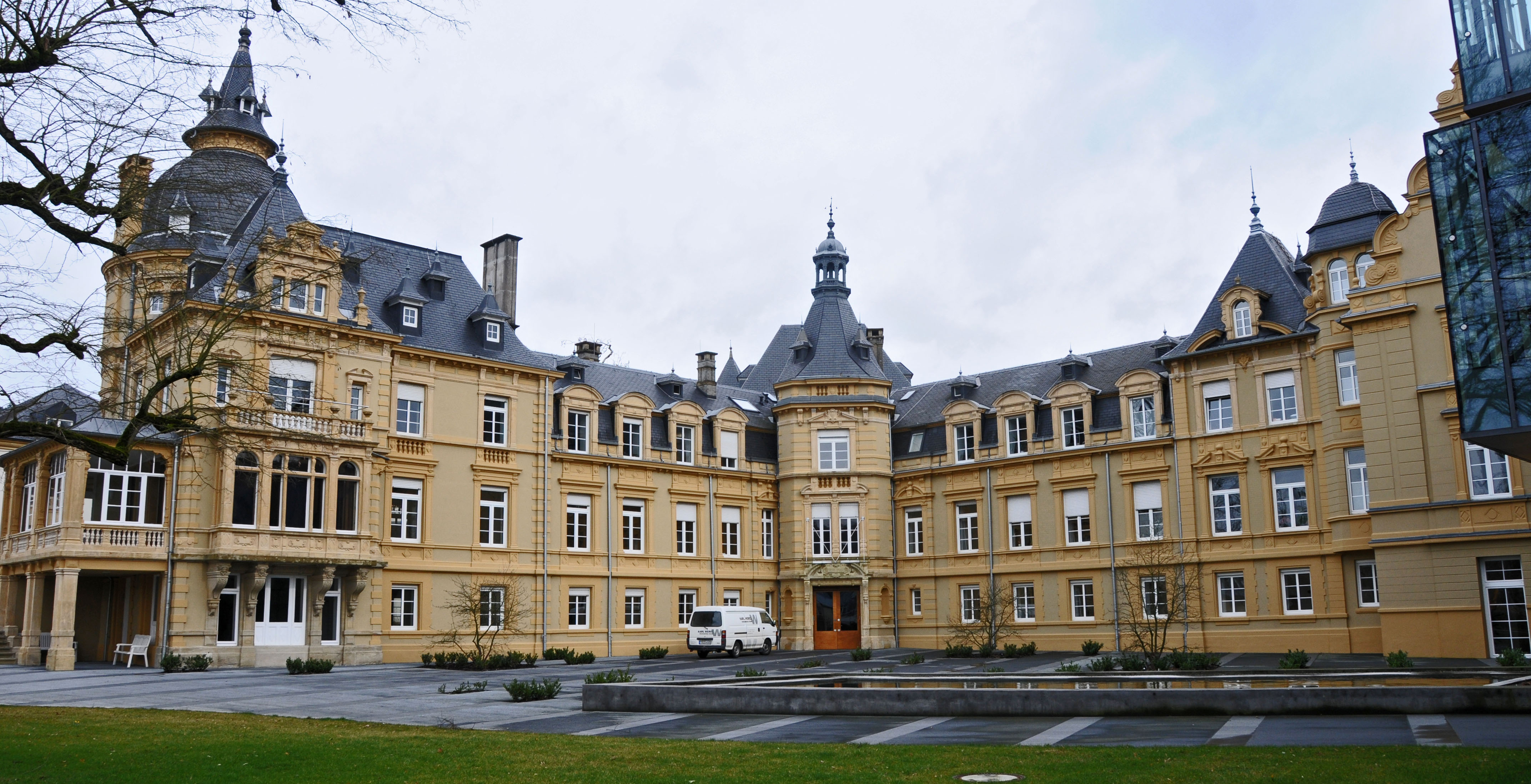
Heisdorf Castle

Heisdorf Castle (Luxembourgish: Schlass Heeschdref; French: Château de Heisdorf; German: Schloss Heisdorf) located in the village of Heisdorf in central Luxembourg was built by Baron Lippmann in the late 19th century. Surrounded by a large park, it was designed by the Belgian architect Charles Thirion. In 1916, the Sisters of the Christian Doctrine acquired the property as a convalescent home for their community. In 1982, it was opened as an old people's home under the name of Maison de retraite Marie-Consolatrice. In 2007, a new wing was added to the building by the architecture firm Hermann, Valentiny and Partners providing improved facilities for its senior citizens.

== Castle ==
=== History ===
In 940, Heisdorf was first mentioned in a document, when King Otto I confirmed the Trier St. Maximin's Abbey's property in Hehchichesdorf. It was probably around that time, the 10th or 11th century, that a castle was built here, with a fortified tower, whose ruins existed until 2006.

In 1314, Heinrich von Stein, or de Lapide, was first mentioned in records as Lord of Heisdorf and owner of the castle.

In 1639, Baron Jean de Beck bought the castle from the descendants of the medieval owners, in order to build a new castle, which was completed by 1645. Jean de Beck, who had acquired a large fortune as well as a noble title while in the service of the Austrian army, also built a castle in Beaufort.

The castle was square, with a fortified wall around it and a tower at each corner. On the side of the Alzette, there was still the large medieval tower.

Beck's building was built along the main road, where the main entrance was also, and consisted of three wings.

The castle was destroyed in 1681 by invading French troops, but was rebuilt in 1685.

In 1711, the descendants of Jean de Beck sold the castle to Guillaume-François and Philippe de Marchant, who owned the forge in Dommeldange.

By 1766, when a cadaster was established under Empress Maria Theresa of Austria, the castle had fallen into disrepair and was only inhabited by a caretaker.

In 1778, the castle came under the ownership of two Alsatian families one after another, first the Mohr de Waldt and then the de Reinach family.

In 1878, their descendants sold the property to the banker, Léon Lippmann, and his wife Lina Nathan. After Léon Lippmann's death in 1883, his widow had Jean de Beck's building torn down, in order to build a new construction.

=== Appearance ===
The castle consists of two wings at a right angle to one another. The main entrance is in the middle of the building, in the square tower which connects the two wings. The end of the wing on the Alzette side consists of a round tower with a roof in form of a cupola, with a spire above it. This tower contains the knights' hall. From the outside, a monumental stairway leads to the first floor of the tower. Above the main entrance, one can see the years 1645 and 1888. The present castle was built in 1888, on the location where Jean de Beck had built a previous castle in 1645. The castle includes a chapel, which was built by the Sisters in 1924, on the side of the main street, where the two wings are connected.

=== Chapel ===
The chapel was built in 1924 and renovated in 2005–2006. The following are of cultural significance:

- A wooden sculpture of Jesus on the cross. This was presumably made in a workshop in Lorraine. In 1983 the Sisters brought it from Nancy to Heisdorf
- Stations of the Cross made of enamel, by the Schwarzmann firm in Trier
- Leaded windows by Gust Zanter.

=== Attached buildings ===
Two other buildings are linked to the Castle: one is the Regina-Pacis House, which is connected to the Castle via a bridge. The house was opened in 1992, and was designed by the architect Michel Mousel.

The castle also has a modern wing, on the Walferdange side; this was completed in 2007, to a design by the architectural firm Hermann & Valentiny.

Along the Mullendorf road is a service building from the early 19th century, which incorporates three portal entrances from the castle of Jean de Beck. One portal has the coat of arms of Jean de Beck and of his wife Catherine de Capelle, as well as the date 1645 (the year in which Jean de Beck's castle was completed).

== Park ==
The castle grounds include a large park, along the main road, from which it is separated by a high wall. The park was renovated after 1910, which left the old trees standing. Two of these, a black pine and an oak tree, are counted among the "notable trees" of Luxembourg.

In the park grounds, there are three separate buildings, which are used for social purposes:

- the Haus Marie-Consolatrice (opened in 1982), on the Mullendorf side: an old people's home
- the Haus Nico-Kremer, alsos called the Foyer du Tricentenaire (1996), a home for the handicapped
- the Chalet Ginkgo (the former laundry building); used since 1980 by youth groups

== See also ==
- List of castles in Luxembourg
