= La Fontaine Castle =

Luxembourgish castle

Coordinates: 49°36′51″N 6°08′36″E

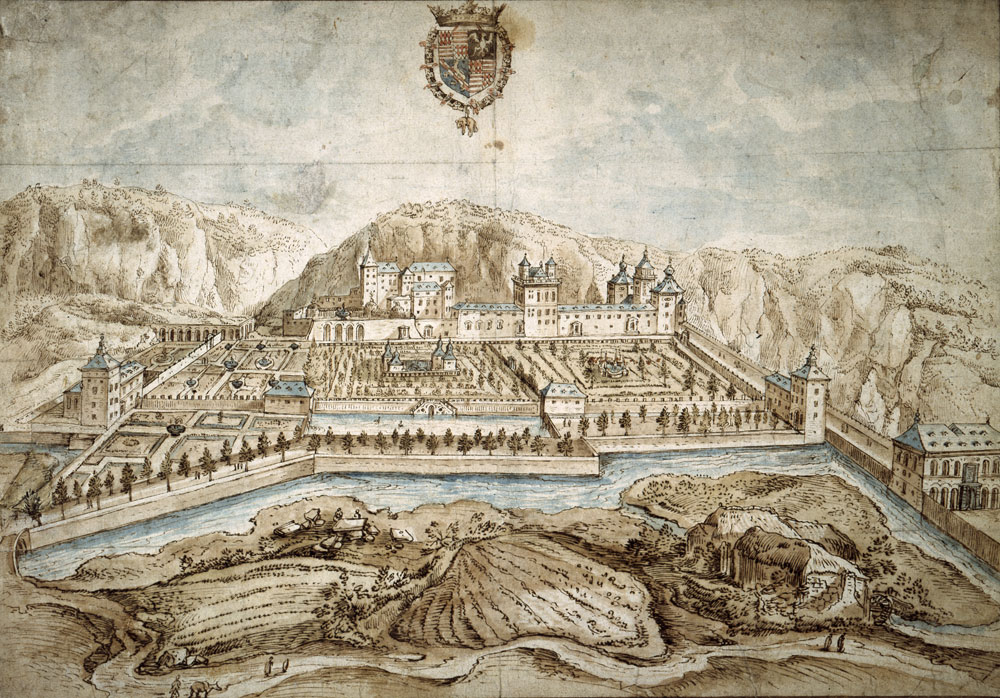
La Fontaine Castle: painting attributed to Tobie Verhaeght

La Fontaine Castle (French: Château La Fontaine, German: Schloss La Fontaine Luxembourgish: Schlass La Fontaine) was a castle in Clausen, Luxembourg. The elaborate building was the residence of Peter Ernst I von Mansfeld-Vorderort, governor of Luxembourg, who began its construction in 1563 and continued to extend it until his death in 1604. For this reason, it is also known as the Palais Mansfeld or Mansfeld Palace. Almost nothing remains of it at present.

== History ==
Mansfeld was appointed governor of Luxembourg in 1545 when he was only 28 years old. His successful military career combined with his interest in antiquity help to explain what drove him to embark on such an ambitious architectural project.

Construction started when Mansfeld and his second wife, Marie de Montmorency, bought the hermitage and the Margaret's chapel belonging to it, as well as twenty houses and additional land from Neumünster Abbey. To build the castle, the road from Neudorf to Clausen was interrupted and a new path built around the land. Mansfeld also rented and closed off the old park of the Counts of Luxembourg, and exchanged plots of land belonging to Neumünster Abbey for those he had purchased. In 1590, he started to surround the whole area with a wall.

The site itself offered not only magnificent views of the city from the front and of rocks and forests from the back but above all water from the River Alzette was available for the gardens, baths and fountains. Indeed, with a façade some 200 metres long, the castle was set back against the surrounding rocks in order to provide a maximum amount of space for the gardens. The gardens were decorated with antique statues, many of which were Roman works of art found in nearby Arlon. The estate, which also included a hunting park, had a 5 km perimeter enclosed by solid walls. Although the name of the architect is unknown, he appears to have been from the Netherlands, perhaps an associate of Hans Vredeman de Vries whose influence can clearly be seen. Some sources maintain that the castle was inspired by Château Fontaine in Forest near Brussels.

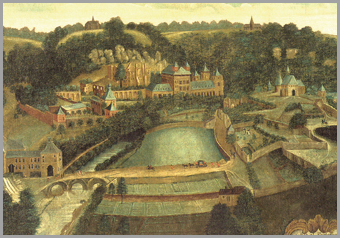
Joachim Laukens: Château La Fontaine (1656)

In the gardens, a Venus fountain was built. This was a rectangular pool with semi-circular apses, with a Venus statue in the middle, riding on a whale. This was surrounded by animal statues, spraying water. Later, a pergola was built around the pool. This fountain, or its remains, are being excavated since 2003.

== Fall into ruin ==
After his death in 1604, Mansfeld bequeathed the furnishings of the castle to Philip III of Spain, who transported all the works of art and antiquities to Madrid. The Infanta Isabella did not accept the legacy of the palace, which was laden with debt. As a result, it began to decay, and was destroyed during the siege of 1684 by the French.

Little remains of the castle. From descriptions by Jean Guillaume Wiltheim, it is known that it was decorated inside. The castle appears on various old city maps. Knowledge of the castle's size and appearance mostly comes from period paintings by Georg Braun (with Franz Hogenberg) and by Joachim Laukens. They show the style was late Gothic with Renaissance influences.

== See also ==
- List of castles in Luxembourg
