= Aspelt Castle =

Baroque residence in Luxembourg

Coordinates: 49°31′28″N 6°13′22″E

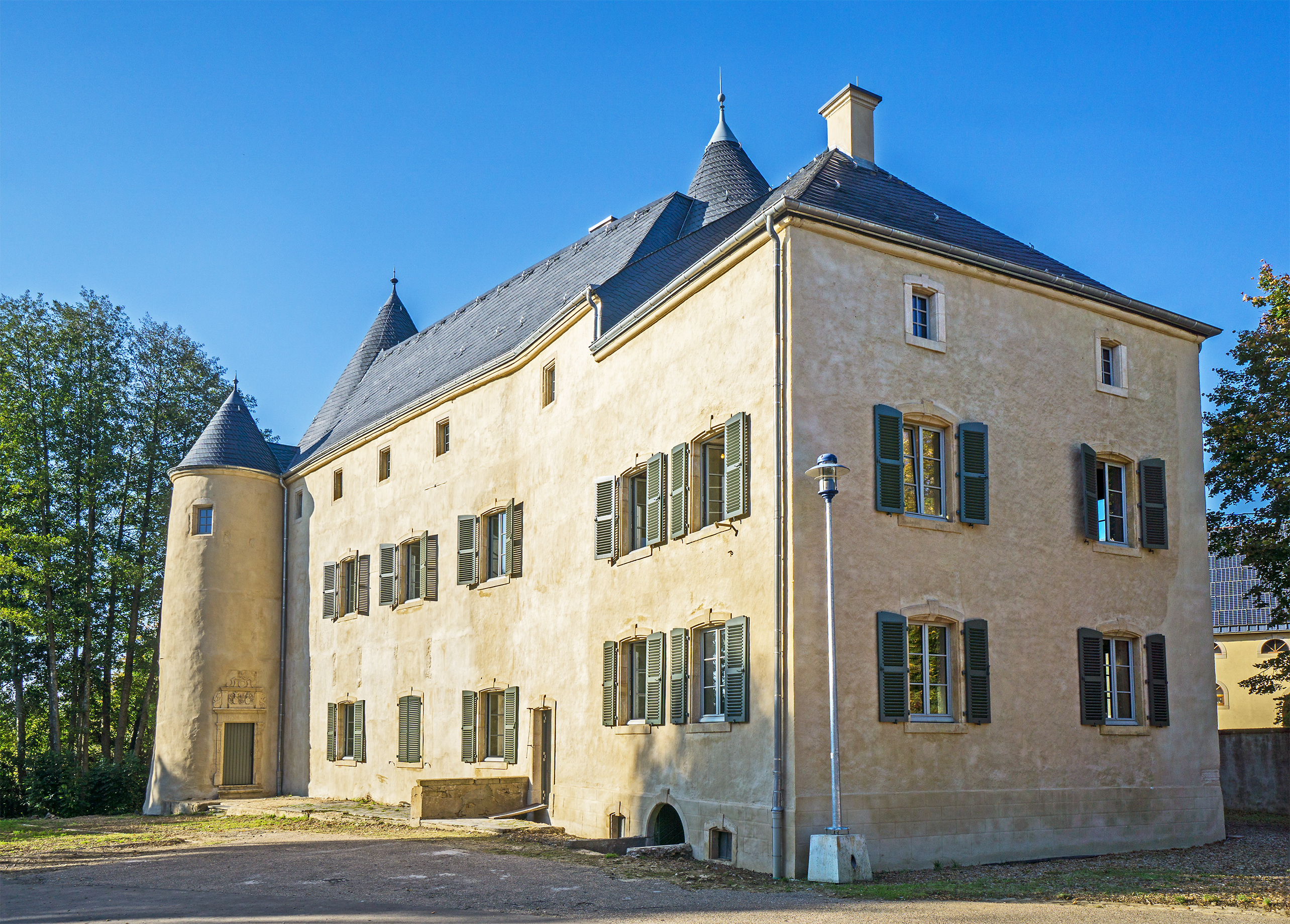
Aspelt Castle

Aspelt Castle (Luxembourgish: Schlass Uespelt; French: Château d'Aspelt), located in Aspelt in the south of Luxembourg, is a Baroque residence built in 1590 on the site of a medieval castle from the 11th century. There are now plans to renovate the building.

== History ==
The origins of Aspelt Castle appear to go back to before 1100 when a fortified castle with a moat was built on the site, possibly on Roman ruins. The first written reference to the castle can be found in Theoderich von Wied's Echternach chronicles from 1132. The foundations of the round Gothic towers are probably from the 14th century while the current building was completed in 1590 following transformations carried out by the Ruelle, Kempt and Burthé families. In 1777, the Martinys extended the palace and installed new Baroque windows in the towers. In 1957, the ground floor of the south-west tower was restored.

== See also ==
- List of castles in Luxembourg
