= Gilsdorf =

Town in the commune of Bettendorf in Luxembourg

Coordinates: 49°52′N 6°11′E

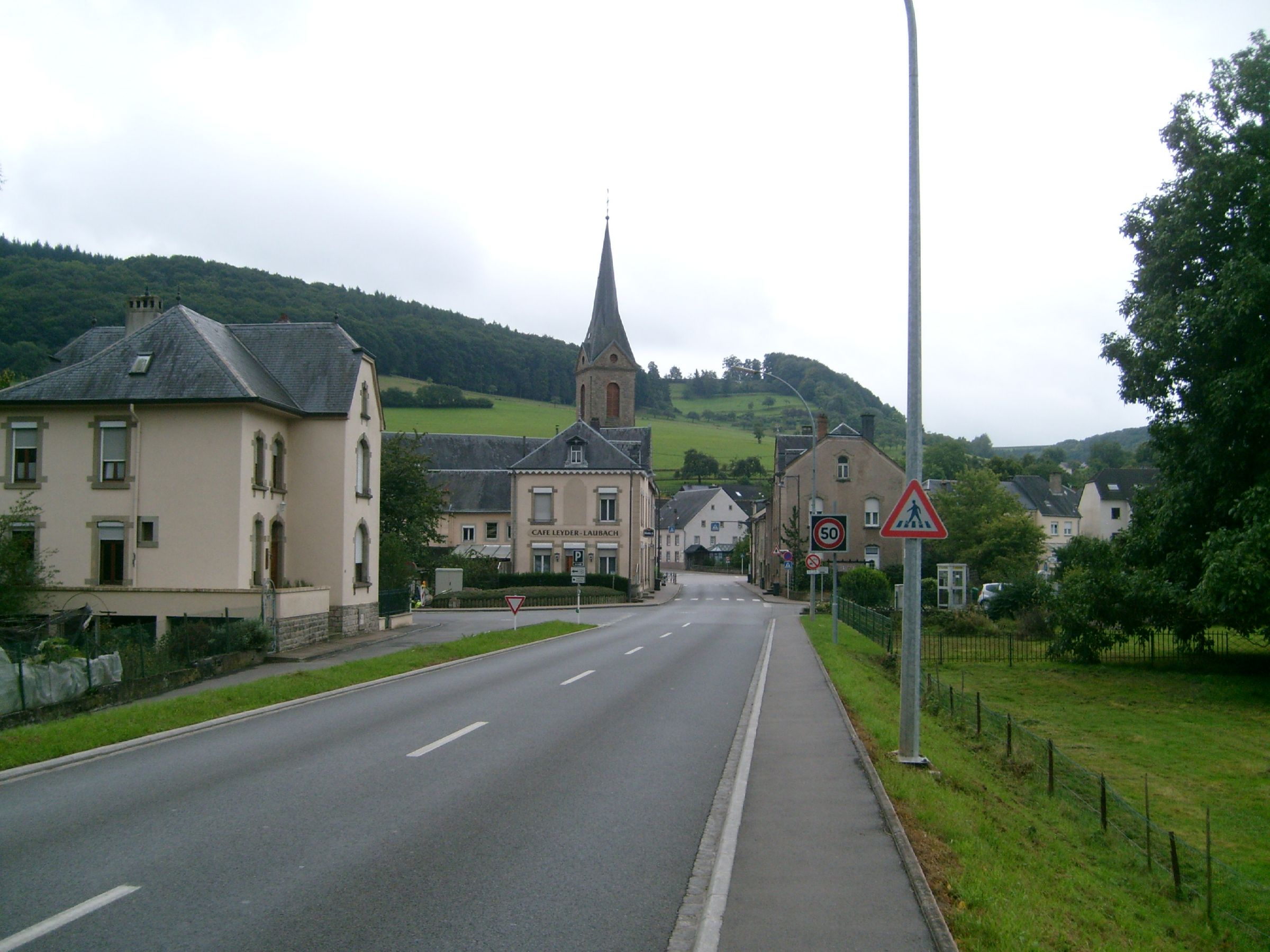
Street of Gilsdorf Village

Gilsdorf (German pronunciation: [ˈɡɪlsˌdɔʁf]; Luxembourgish: Gilsdref) is a small town in the commune of Bettendorf, in north-eastern Luxembourg. As of September 2026, the town has a population of 1,165.

Prince Louis of Luxembourg, the third son of Grand Duke Henri, married his partner Tessy Antony at the village church in 2006, where the pair had baptised their son Gabriel earlier that year. While it was an unusual choice of venue for the wedding of a prince of the ruling Grand Ducal family, it is supposed that its relative isolation from Luxembourg City proved to be a favourable factor considering the Grand Ducal family to avoid publicity as far as possible. Some speculation also arose concerning the Gilsdorf church's connection to the Charismatic movement.
