= Bettendorf Castle =

Coordinates: 49°52′33″N 6°13′14″E

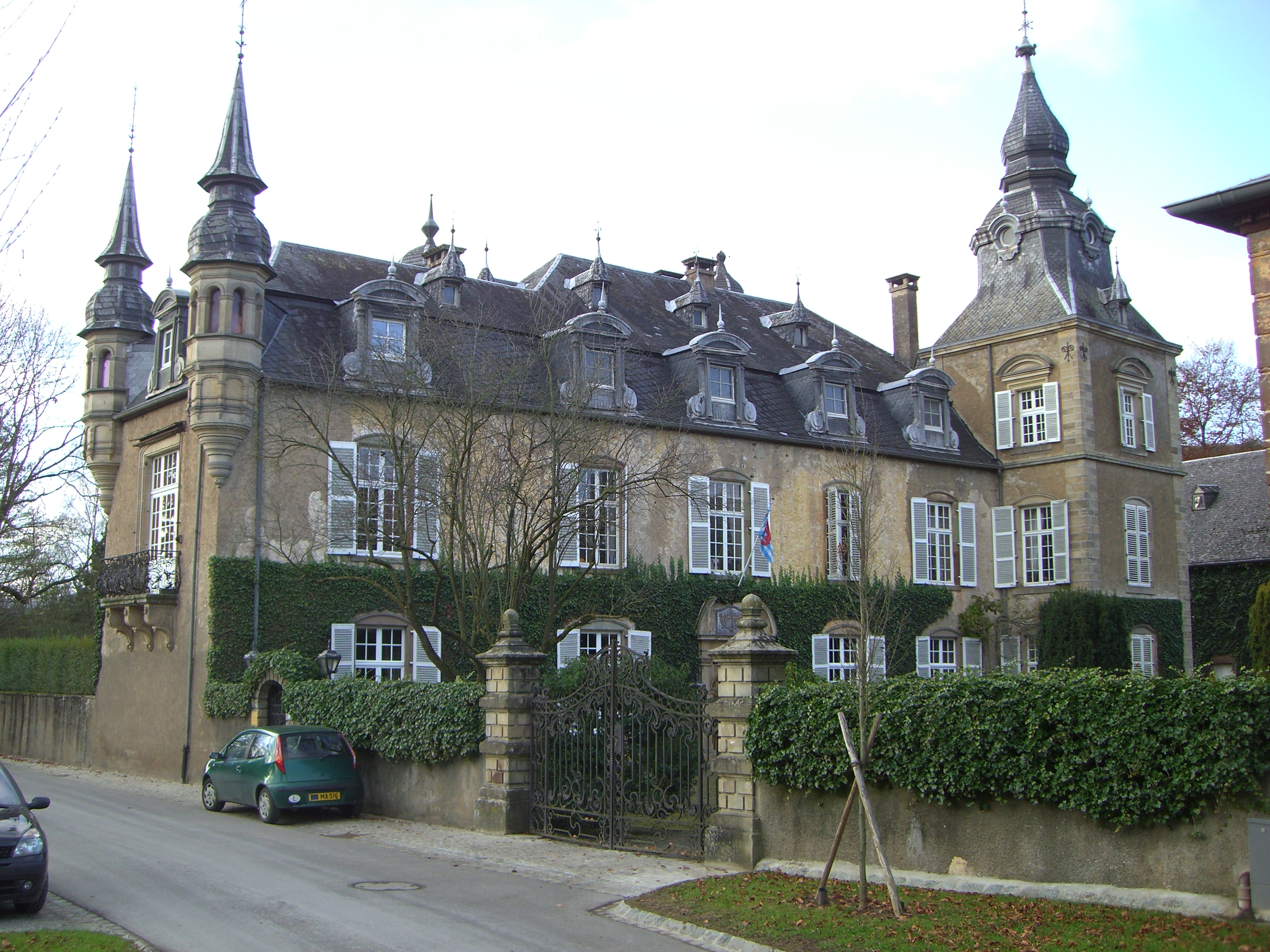
Bettendorf Castle

Bettendorf Castle (Luxembourgish: Schlass Bettenduerf; French: Château de Bettendorf) is located in the village of Bettendorf in eastern Luxembourg. While there appears to have been a castle from the 13th century, today's Baroque building dates from 1728 and was restored in 1962. The castle is privately owned and is not open to the public. In 2007, the castle and its parkland, were added to Luxembourg's national register of classified monuments.

== See also ==
- List of castles in Luxembourg
