= Schauwenburg Castle =

Luxembourg fort history

Coordinates: 49°36′40″N 6°02′59″E

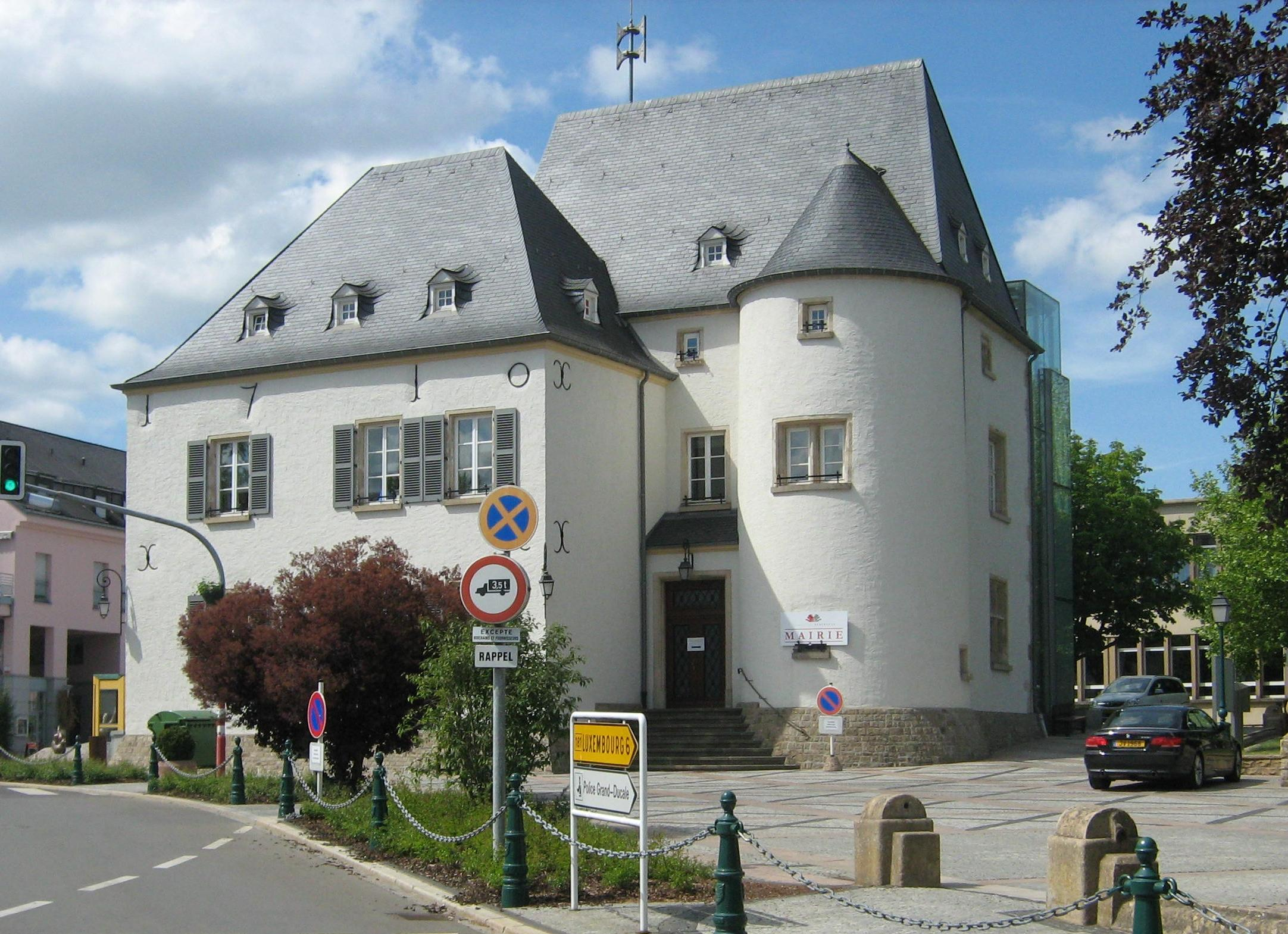
Schauwenburg Castle, Bertrange

Schauwenburg Castle (Luxembourgish: Schlass Schauwebuerg; French: Château Schauenburg) in Bertrange in south-western Luxembourg has a history dating back to the Middle Ages when, according to historical references from the early 13th century, the Lords of Bertrange occupied a fortified castle. Today's building originated in the 16th century as testified by the Renaissance windows on the eastern and northern wings, the façade being completed in 1710. Around 1780, the d'Huart family who lived in the castle found the facilities too small and constructed a larger building, the Château de Colnet d'Huart, in the vicinity. Over the year, the Schauwenburg Castle has had many different owners and has been used for a variety of purposes. Since 2008, it has temporarily housed the Commune's administrative offices and served as the town hall.

== See also ==
- List of castles in Luxembourg
