= Bourglinster Castle =

Castle in Luxembourg

Coordinates: 49°42′N 6°13′E

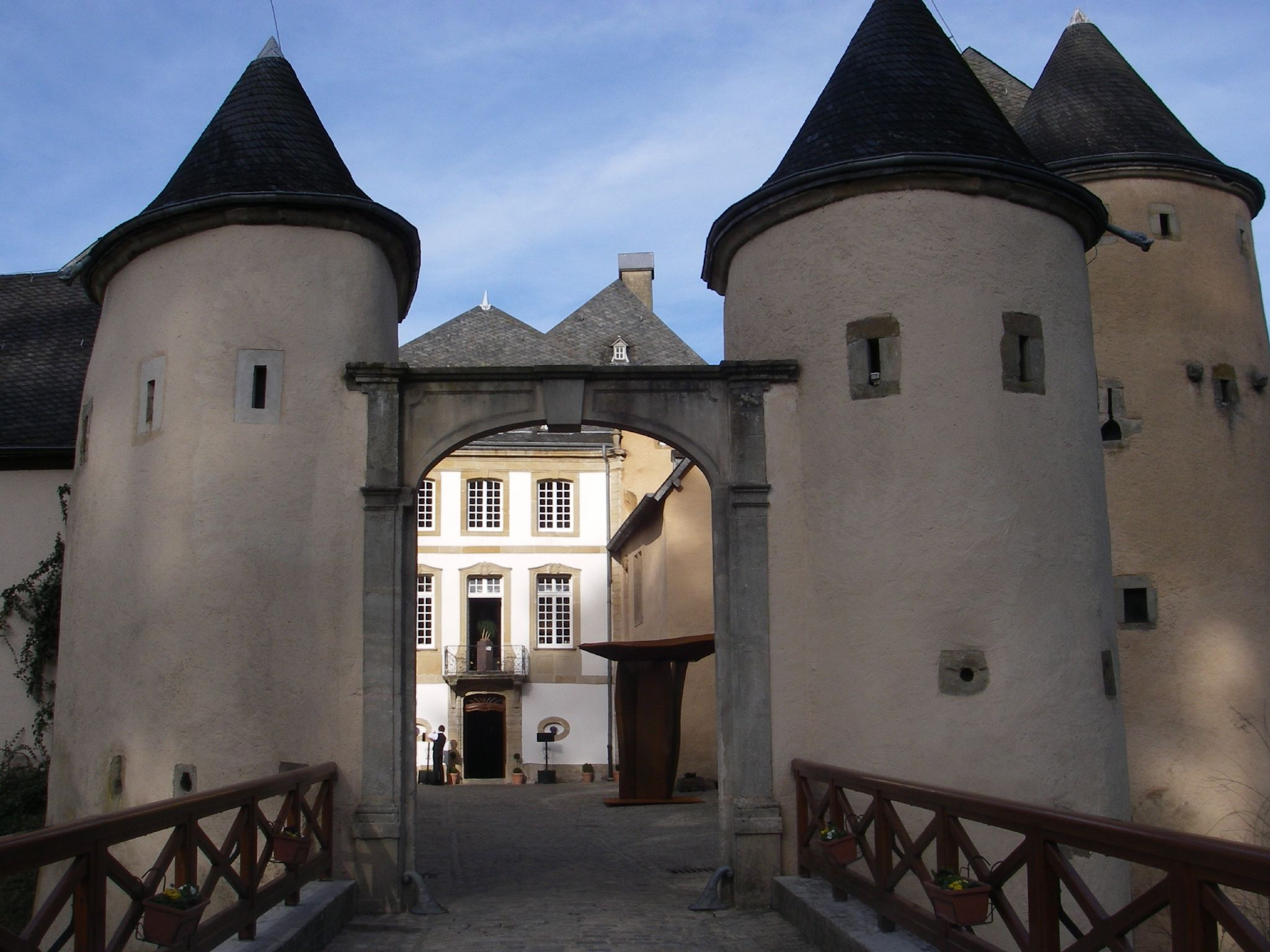
Bourglinster Castle

Bourglinster Castle (Luxembourgish: Schlass Buerglënster; French: Château de Bourglinster; German: Schloss Burglinster) also known as Burg Linster, is located in the village of Bourglinster in central Luxembourg some 17 km (11 mi) to the east of Luxembourg City. Now housing a restaurant and facilities for business and cultural gatherings, the castle has a history stretching back to the 11th century.

== History ==
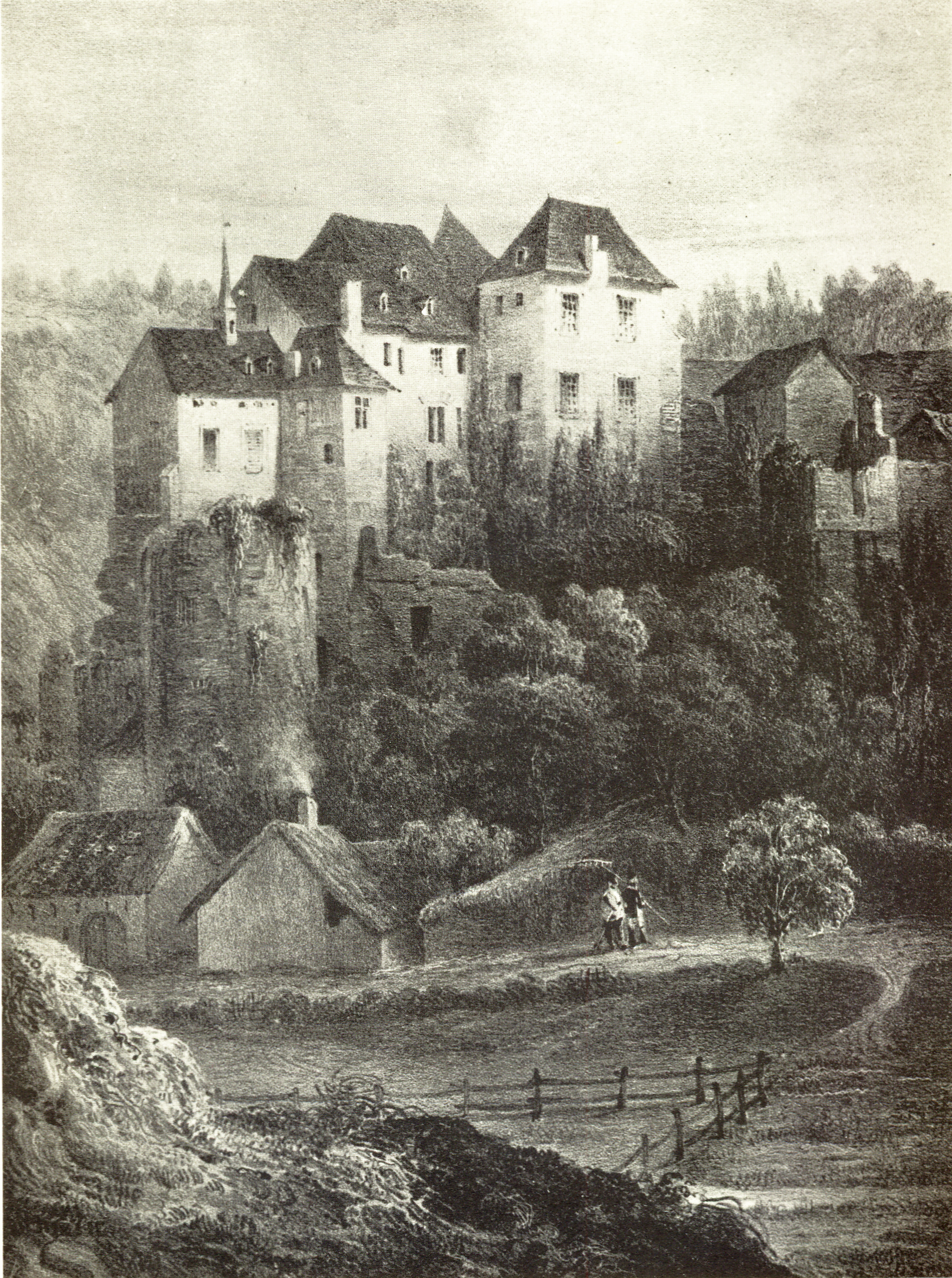
Bourglinster Castle, drawing by Nicolas Liez (1834)

The castle is first mentioned in 1098 as belonging to St Symeon of Trier. At the time it had a residential keep, a chapel and a wall. During the second half of the 14th century, the chapel was extended and a tower was added on the northern side. The lower castle with a moat and two defensive towers was built in the 15th century. Both the lower and upper castle were partly destroyed during the 16th century wars (1542–1544) but were soon repaired and a Renaissance wing was added (1548).

Parts of the lower castle were again destroyed by the French in the 1680s. In the early 18th century, a Baroque façade was built at the far end of the courtyard. After the castle was acquired by the Luxembourg State in 1968, the buildings were fully restored and, in 1982, opened for exhibitions, concerts, meetings and receptions.

== Business and cultural facilities ==
The castle's three banqueting halls with facilities for up to 200 people offer venues for business meetings, gala dinners and cultural events. La Distillerie, a restaurant on the castle premises, is considered to be one of the best in Luxembourg.

The castle is the venue for the Festival de musique de chambre (Chamber Music Festival) organised by the Friends of Bourglinster Castle. Performances take place in the Salle des chevaliers (knight's hall). The former stables are an arts centre, managed by an artists' collective. A barn has been converted into a used book store, the Pabeierscheier (Paper Barn).

== See also ==
- List of castles in Luxembourg
