= Heisdorf =

Town in the commune of Steinsel, Luxembourg

Coordinates: 49.673°N 6.139°E

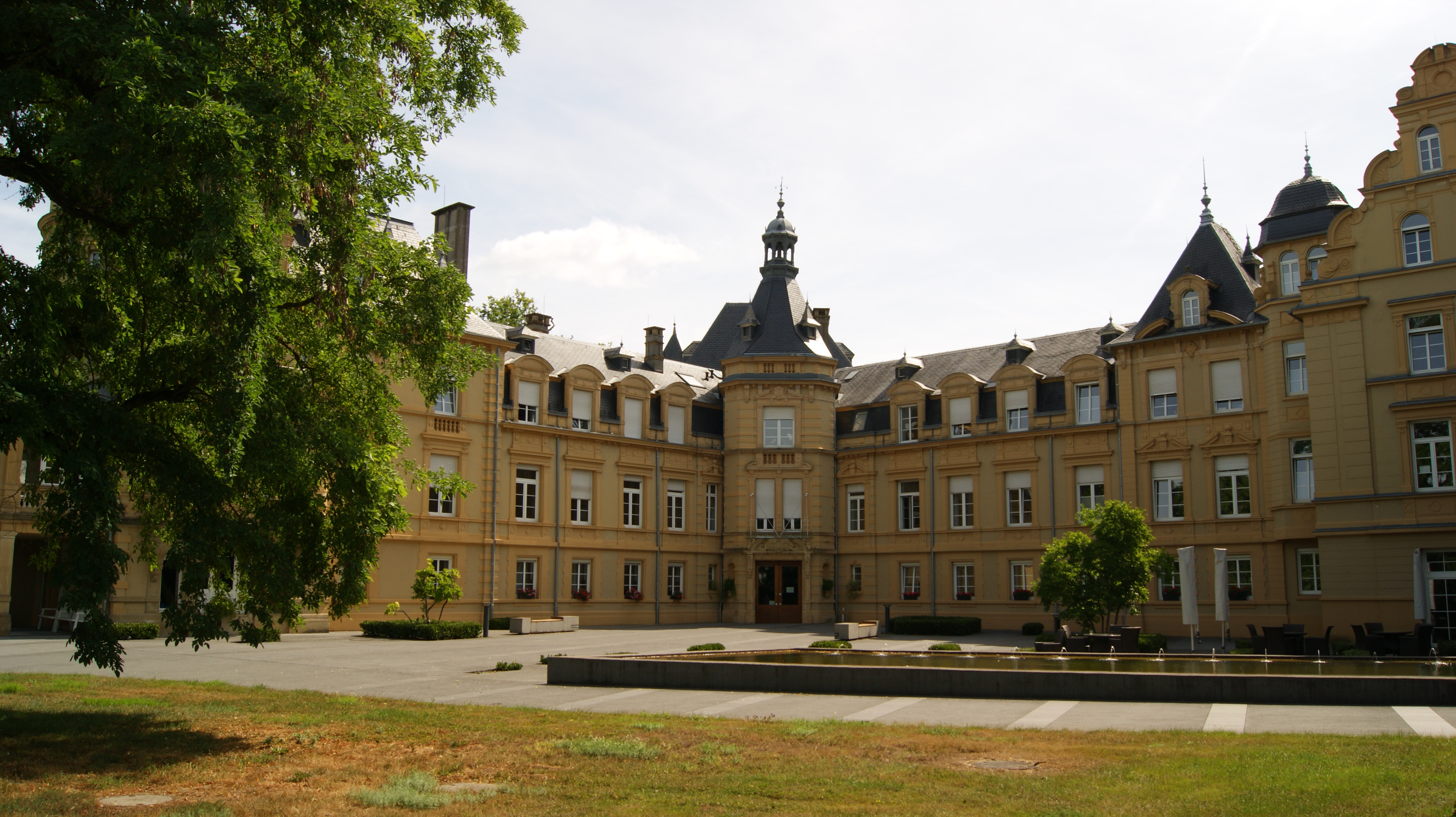
Heisdorf Castle

Heisdorf (German pronunciation: [ˈhaɪsdɔʁf]; Luxembourgish: Heeschdrëf) is a town in the commune of Steinsel, in central Luxembourg. As of September 2026, the town has a population of 2,236. It is noted for Heisdorf Castle and is served by a railway station.
