= Stolzembourg =

Village in Luxembourg

Coordinates: 49°58′N 6°10′E

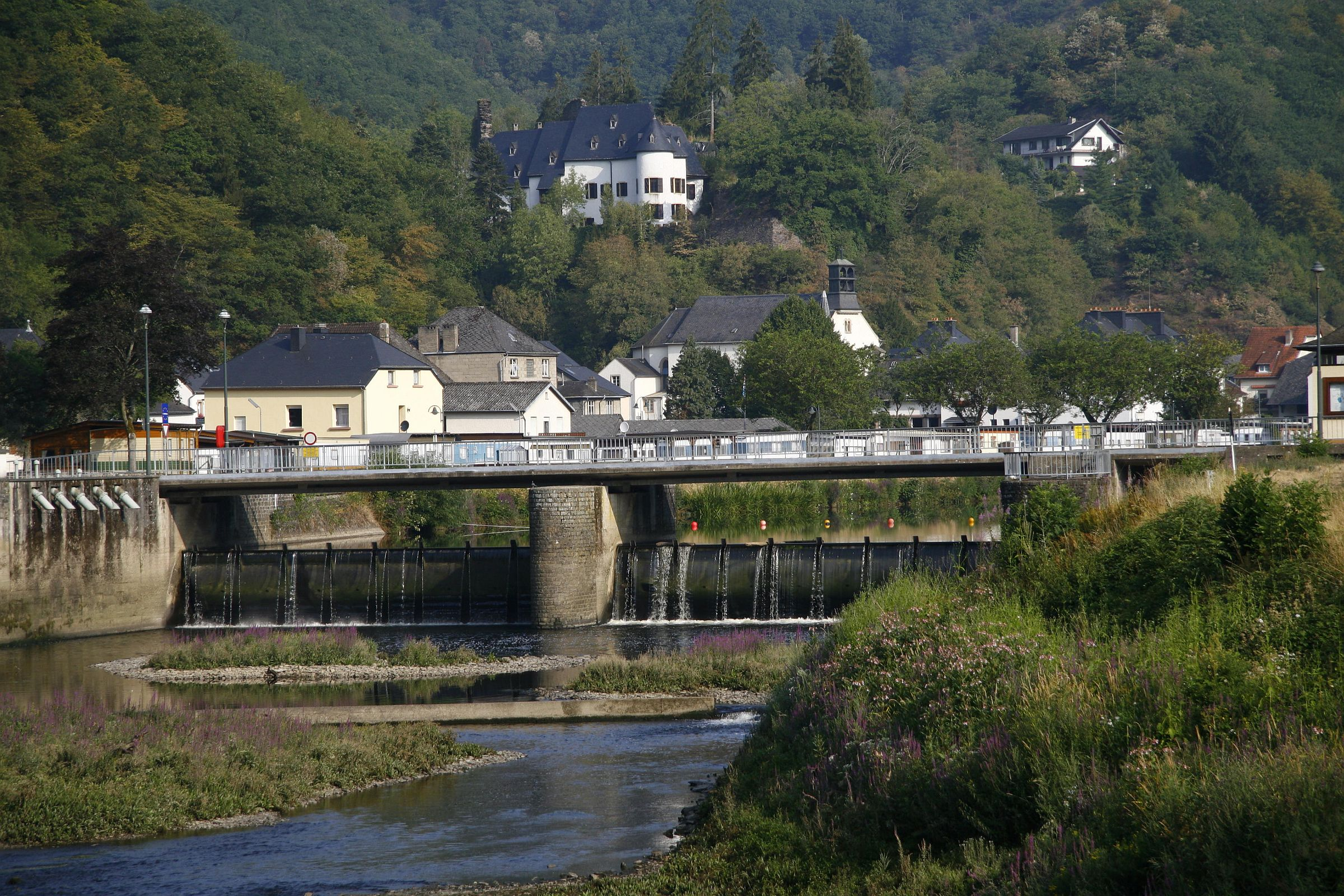
Stolzembourg

Stolzembourg (Luxembourgish: Stolzebuerg; German: Stolzemburg [ˈʃtɔltsm̩ˌbʊʁk]) is a village in the commune of Putscheid, in north-eastern Luxembourg. As of September 2026, the village has a population of 207.

Stolzembourg Castle is located on a hill in the centre of the village. The current building was built on the ruins of the medieval castle in 1898 in the style of a Scottish country house.

The village is also known for the fact that in World War II US troops crossed the border at Stolzembourg into Nazi Germany for the first time. On 11 September 1944 a patrol led by Sgt. Warner W. Holzinger of the 2nd Platoon, Troop B, 85th Cavalry Reconnaissance Squadron, 5th Armored Division, crossed the river Our and reached Keppeshausen.

== See also ==
- List of villages in Luxembourg
