= Aspelt =

Town in southern Luxembourg

Coordinates: 49°31′N 6°13′E

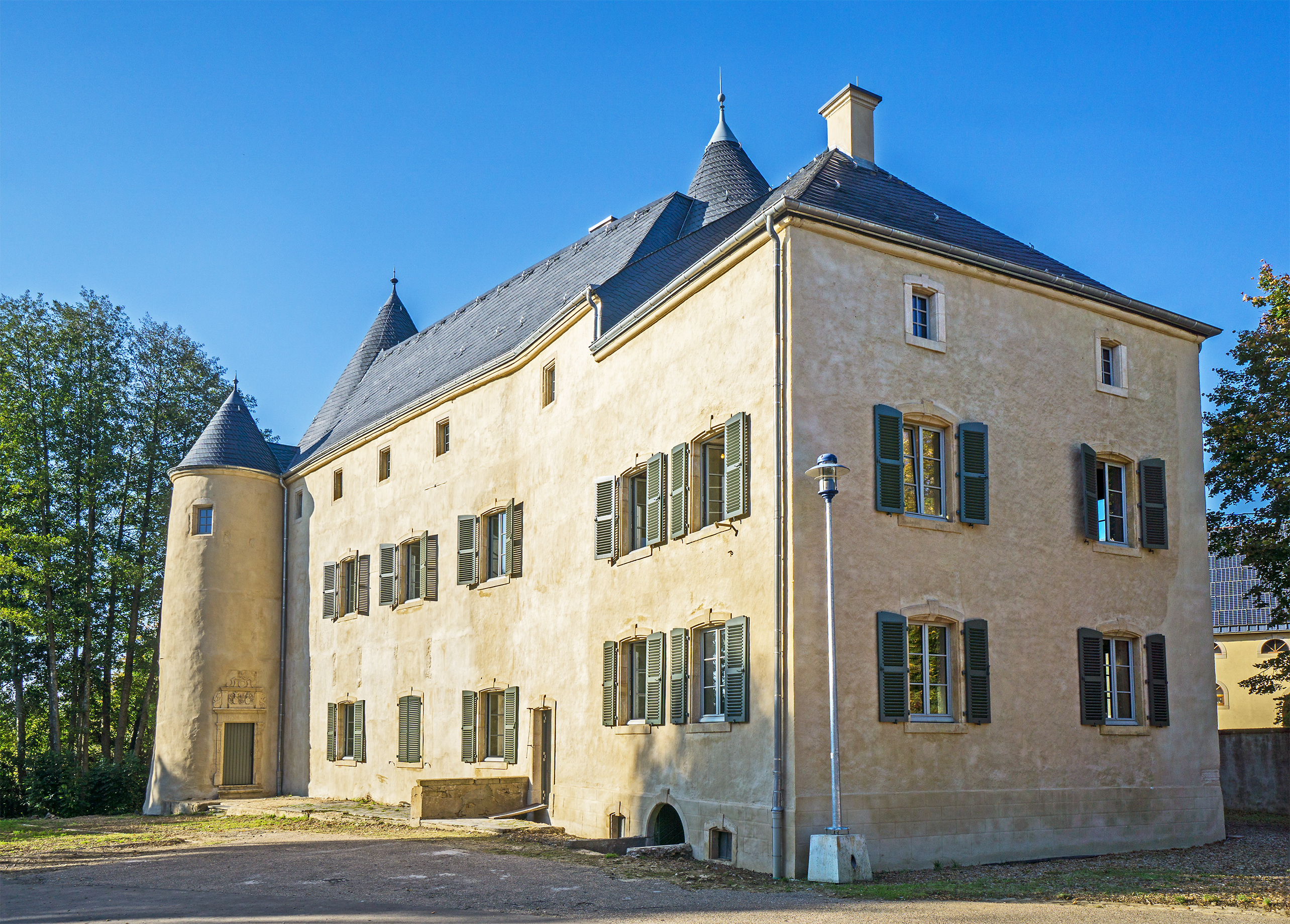
Castle of Aspelt after the restoration

Aspelt (Luxembourgish: Uespelt) is a small town in the commune of Frisange, in southern Luxembourg. As of September 2026, its population was 1,675.

Aspelt Castle in the centre of the town is a Baroque residence built in 1590 on the site of a medieval castle from the 11th century. There are now plans to renovate the building.
