= Stolzembourg Castle =

Coordinates: 49°58′N 06°10′E

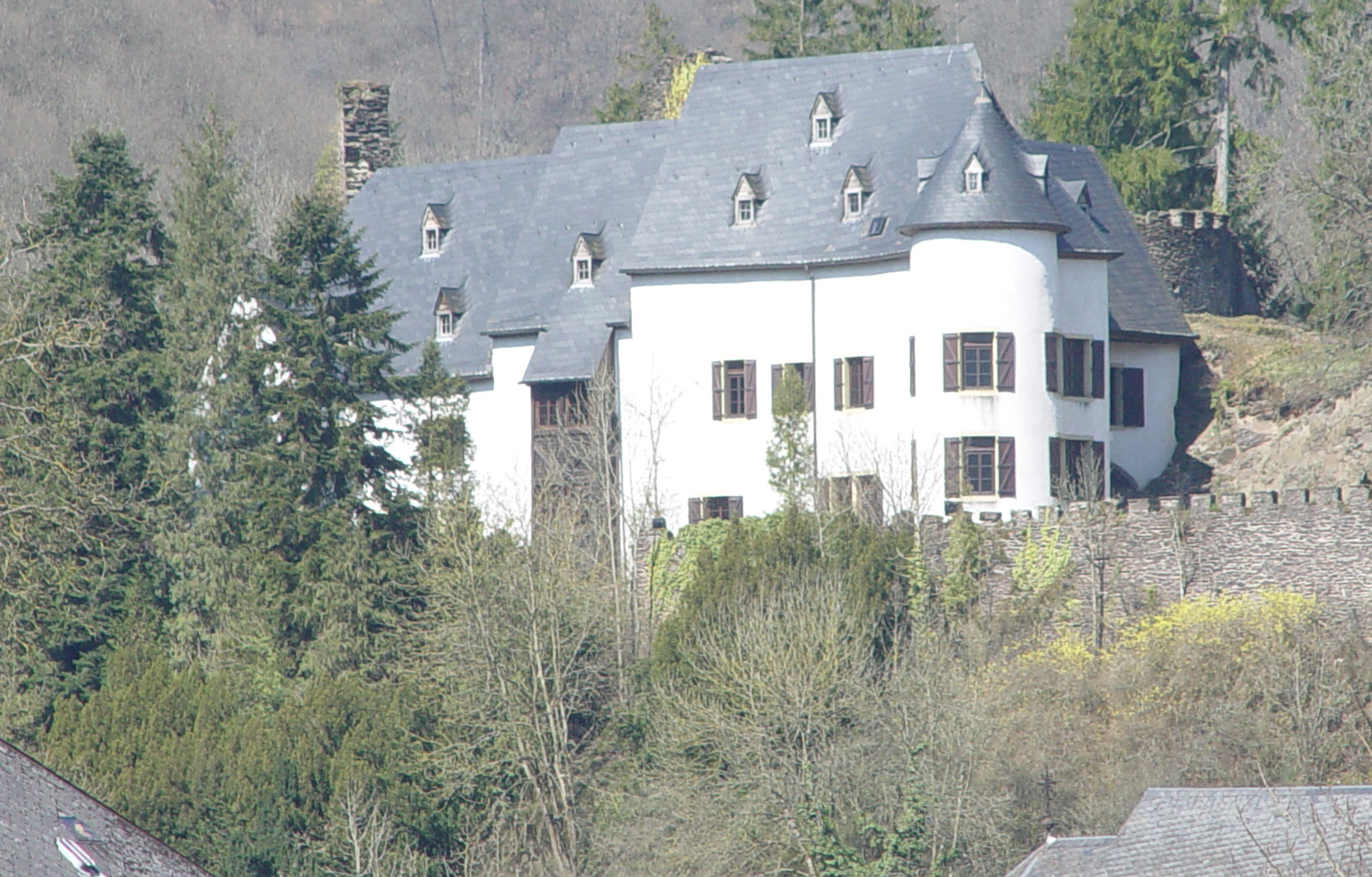
Stolzembourg Castle

Stolzembourg Castle (Luxembourgish: Buerg Stolzebuerg; French: Château de Stolzembourg; German: Burg Stozembourg) is located on a hill in the centre of the village of Stolzembourg in north-eastern Luxembourg. The current building was built on the ruins of the medieval castle in 1898 in the style of a Scottish country house.

== History ==
In the 12th century, a tower was built to keep watch over the road along the River Our. The first mention of a fortress was in 1315. In 1454, the governor Antoine de Croÿ pulled down the castle. After it had been rebuilt, it was finally destroyed by the French troops of Louis XIV in 1679. In 1898, a Scottish-style country house was built on the ruins.

== The castle today ==
The castle is privately owned and is not open to visitors.
