= Bourglinster =

Town in Junglinster, Luxembourg

Coordinates: 49°42′N 6°13′E

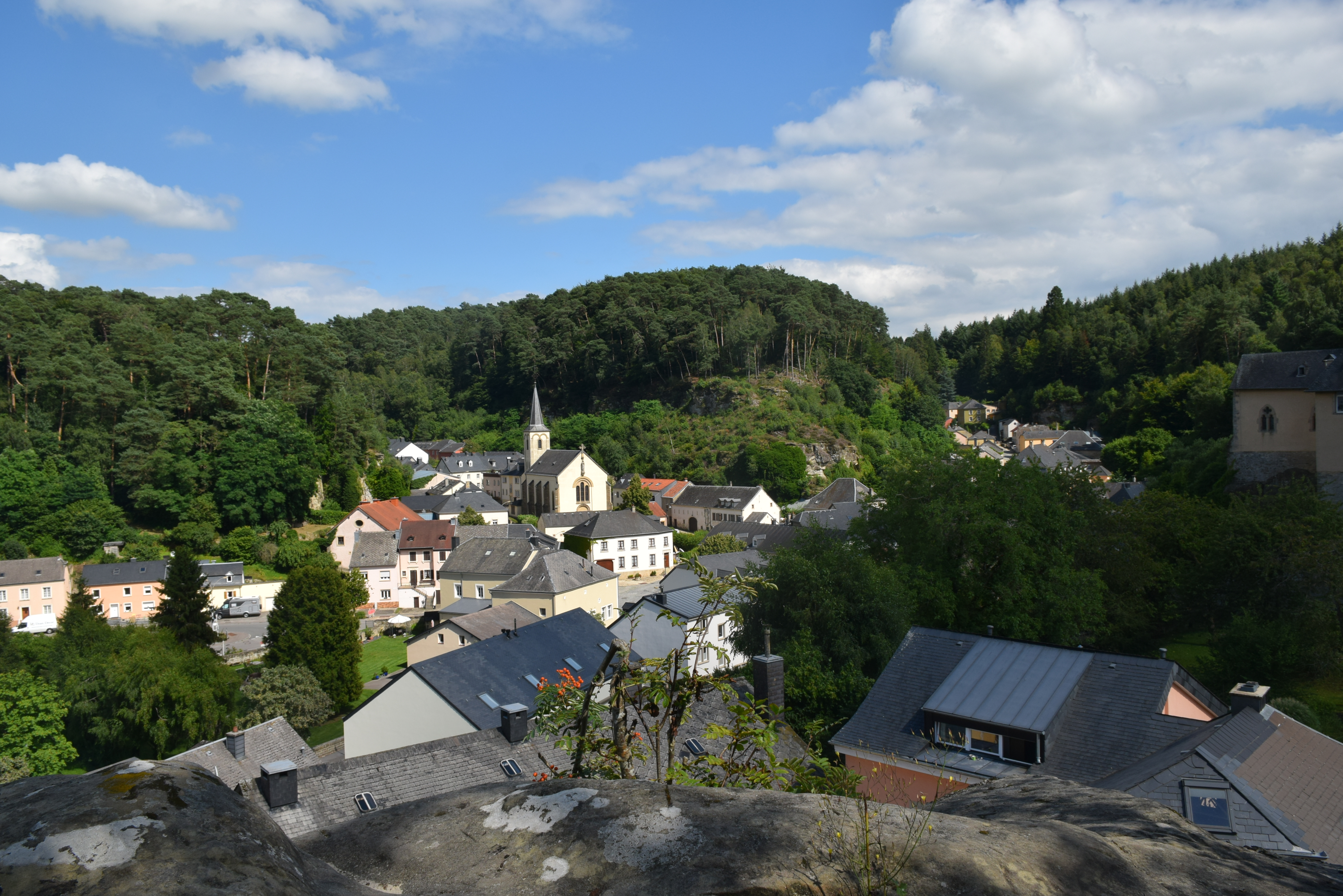
Town of Bourglinster

Bourglinster (Luxembourgish: Buerglënster, German: Burglinster) is a small town in the commune of Junglinster, in central Luxembourg. As of September 2026, the town has a population of 766.

The town's 11th century restored Bourglinster Castle, with its onsite restaurant, is frequently used as a venue for conferences and cultural events.

== In popular culture ==
The town was used as the main filming location of season 1 of Capitani, the first Netflix TV series from Luxembourg, in which it is presented as the fictional village of Manscheid.
