= Bettendorf, Luxembourg =

Bettendorf Bettenduerf (Luxembourgish)
- Commune
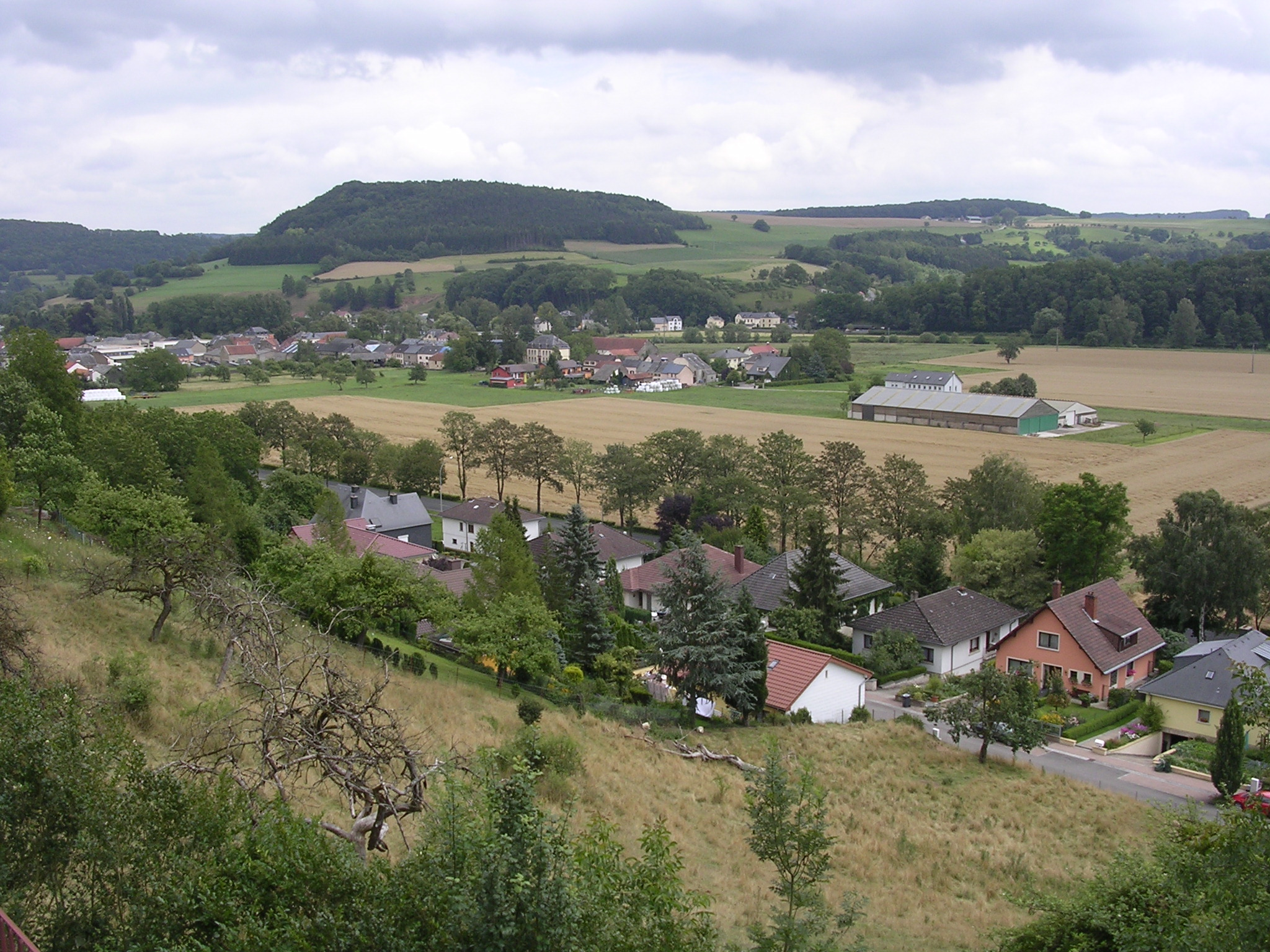

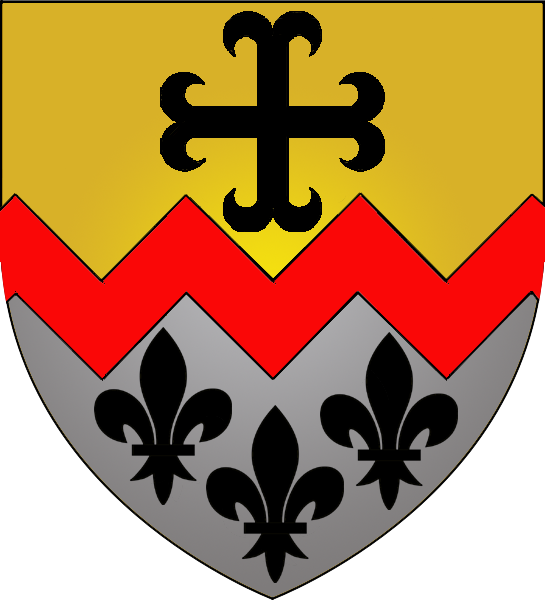
- Coat of arms

- Map of Luxembourg with Bettendorf highlighted in orange, and the canton in dark red
- Coordinates: 49.8833°N 6.2167°E
- Country: Luxembourg
- Canton: Diekirch

Government
  - Mayor: Patrick Mergen (DP)

Area
  - Total: 23.24 km^{2} (8.97 sq mi)
  - Rank: 41st of 100
- Highest elevation: 422 m (1,385 ft)
  - Rank: 34th of 100
- Lowest elevation: 180 m (590 ft)
  - Rank: 16th of 100

Population (2026)
  - Total: 3,051
  - Rank: 55th of 100
  - Density: 131.3/km^{2} (340.0/sq mi)
  - Rank: 59th of 100
  - Locality/Town: 1,365
- Time zone: UTC+1 (CET)
  - Summer (DST): UTC+2 (CEST)
- LAU 2: LU0000601
- Website: bettendorf.lu

Bettendorf (German pronunciation: [ˈbɛtn̩dɔʁf]; Luxembourgish: Bettenduerf) is a commune and town in eastern Luxembourg. It lies along the river Sauer. It is part of the canton of Diekirch, which is part of the district of Diekirch.

As of September 2026, the town of Bettendorf itself, which lies in the centre of the commune, has a population of 1,368. Other villages within the commune include Bleesbruck, Gilsdorf and Moestroff.

The privately owned Bettendorf Castle dates from 1728 and is built in the Baroque style.

== Population ==
Historical population

Year	Pop.	±%
1821	1,259	—
1851	1,885	+49.7%
1900	1,793	−4.9%
1910	1,873	+4.5%
1922	1,787	−4.6%
1935	1,681	−5.9%

Year	Pop.	±%
1947	1,457	−13.3%
1960	1,459	+0.1%
1970	1,559	+6.9%
1981	1,748	+12.1%
1990	1,923	+10.0%
2000	2,296	+19.4%

Year	Pop.	±%
2005	2,400	+4.5%
2010	2,506	+4.4%
2015	2,630	+4.9%
2020	2,907	+10.5%
2021	2,902	−0.2%

Source data
