= Septfontaines Castle =

Coordinates: 49°42′01.56″N 05°57′48.69″E

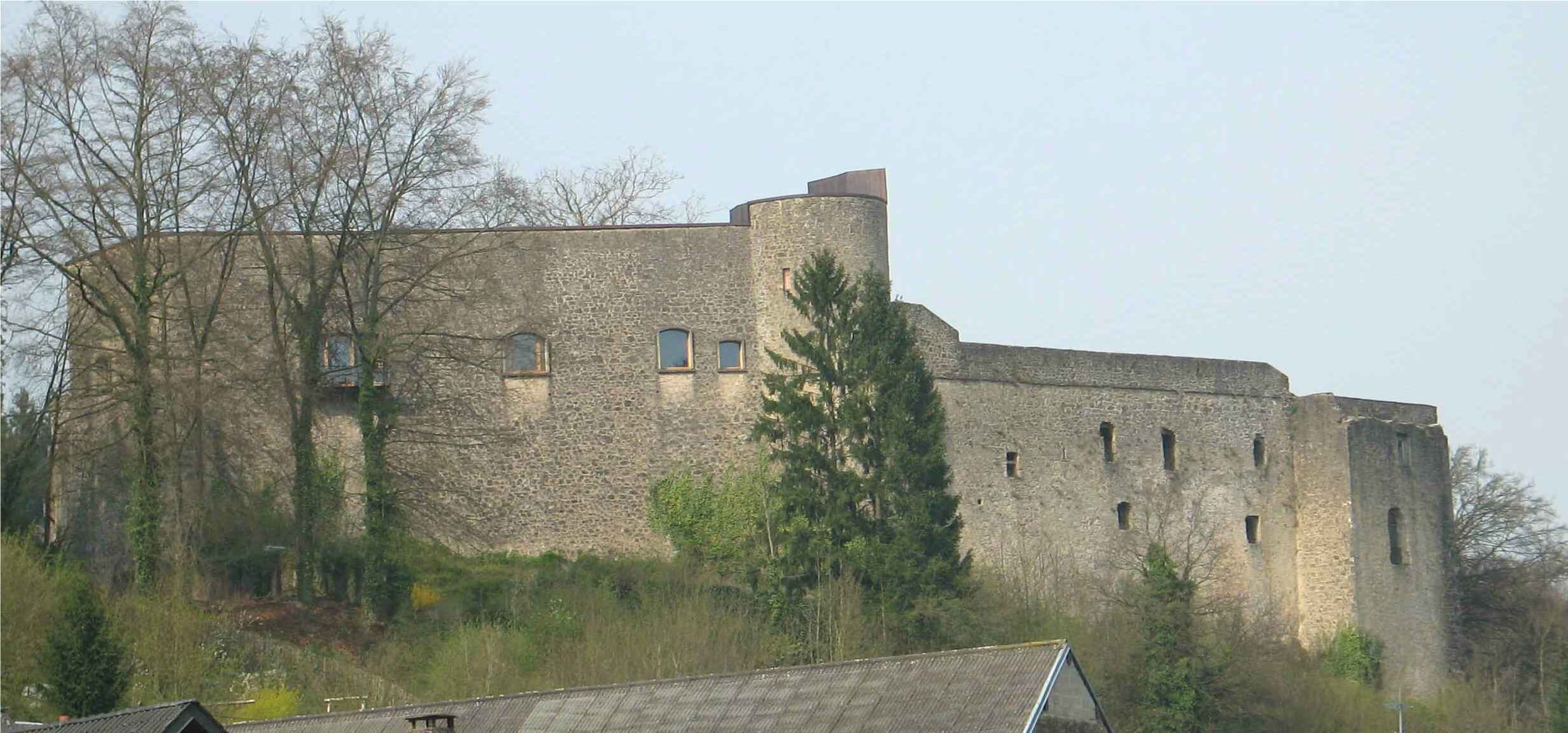
Septfontaines Castle

Septfontaines Castle (French: Château de Septfontaines, Luxembourgish: Buerg Simmer) in central Luxembourg is one of the castles belonging to the Valley of the Seven Castles. Located high above the village of Septfontaines, the medieval castle is now privately owned.

== History ==
It is not clear when the first castle was built in Septfontaines. In 1192, there is a reference to someone by the name of Tider who was Lord of Septfontaines. In 1233, Jean de Septfontaines placed the property under the protection of Countess Ermesinde of Luxembourg. At the beginning of the 14th century, Thomas de Septfontaines, a friend and companion of Emperor Henry VII, was the lord of the castle. In 1600, Christoph von Criechingen built a huge Renaissance tower at the northern entrance. In 1779, a fire destroyed the castle which increasingly fell into ruin. In 1919, the castle was partly demolished but in 1920 the owners attempted to carry out restoration work, but did not pay much attention to historical architectural requirements.

== The castle today ==
Today the castle is privately owned and cannot be visited.

== See also ==
- Château de Septfontaines in the Rollingergrund
