= Wintrange =

Town in southeastern Luxembourg

Coordinates: 49°30′N 6°21′E

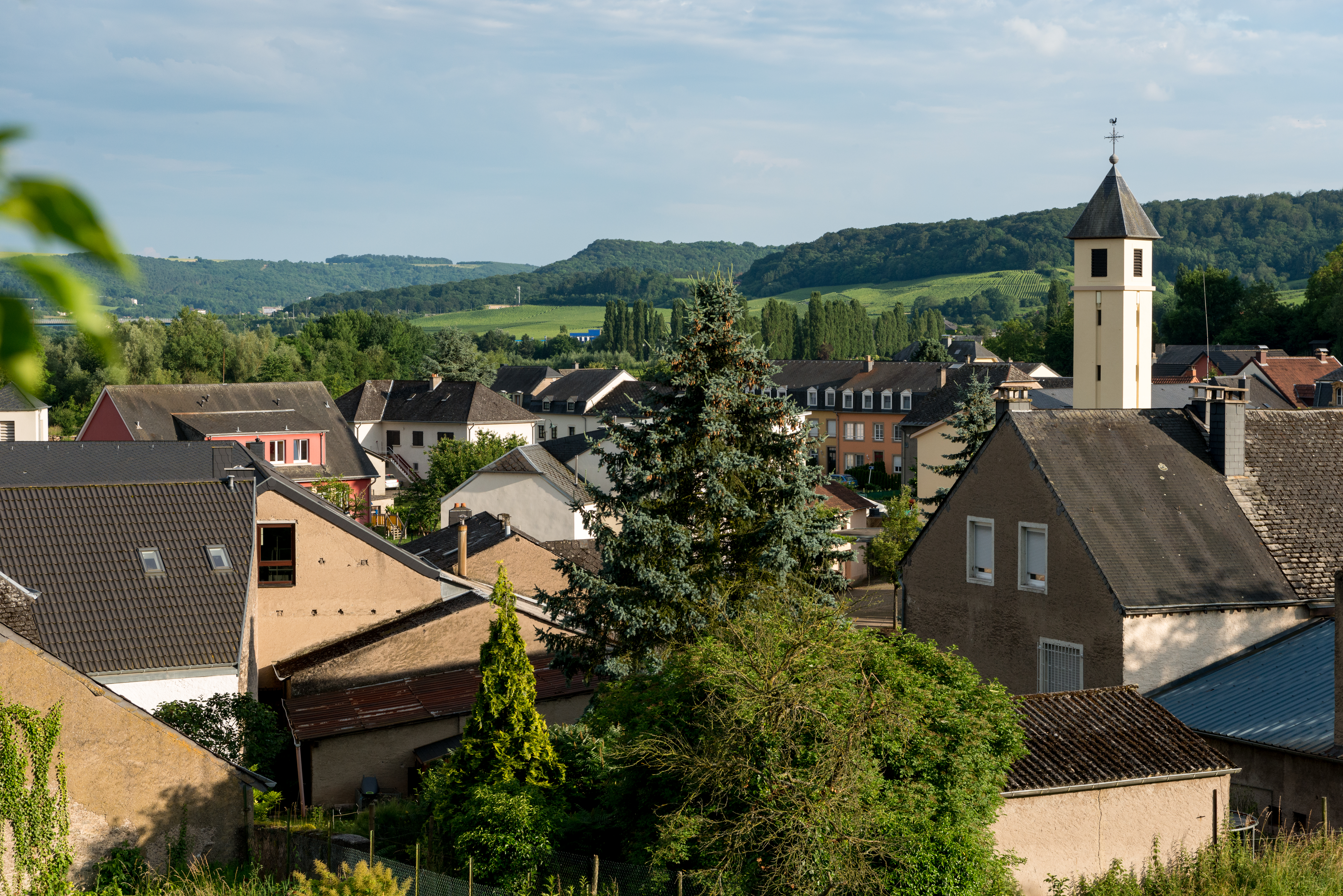
Wintrange, June 2016

Wintrange (French pronunciation: [vɛ̃tʁɑ̃ʒ]; Luxembourgish: Wëntreng; German: Wintringen [ˈvɪntʁɪŋən]) is a small town in the commune of Schengen, in southeastern Luxembourg. As of September 2026, the town has a population of 474.

== Village of Wintrange ==
Wintrange is surrounded by vineyards and the wild nature reserve and bird sanctuary called Haff Remich. The reserve has diverse trees and plants that feed birds throughout the year. The nature reserve spreads south towards Remerschen. Facing west, Wintrange has a vineyard in Luxembourg's Moselle valley growing mainly white wines and Pinot. Wintrange lies at the foot of a vineyard hill named Felsberg. A stairway with 595 steps leads to the top of Felsberg. The sculpture of Donatus of Muenstereifel reigns over the village, protecting the wines from storm and hail. The vineyards' plateau consists of deciduous and coniferous forests.

== Château de Wintrange ==
Located in the village's center lies the privately owned Renaissance Château de Wintrange built in 1610. The Château de Wintrange is a historic landmark nested in the Moselle valley and is surrounded by a 1.5-hectare (3.7-acre) private wild park. Adjacent to the park is the Haff Remich bird sanctuary and national park with lakes and ponds stretching down to the Moselle. The Château is privately owned. Smaller conferences, exclusive weddings or private events are held there.

== Local Winery ==
The local winery Schumacher-Knepper is located right across from the Château.
