= Bettange-sur-Mess =

Village in Luxembourg

Coordinates: 49°35′N 5°59′E

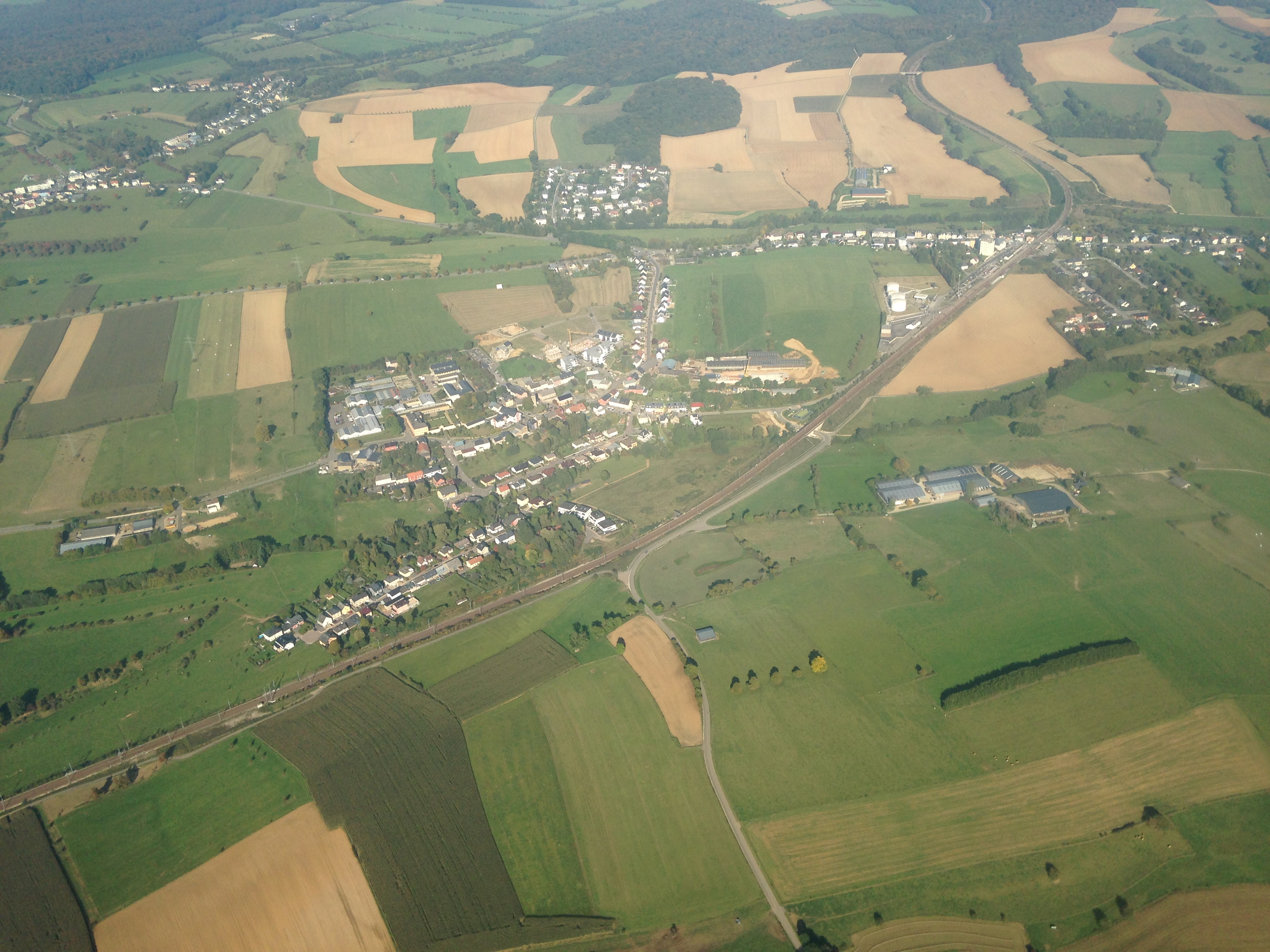
Aerial view of Bettange-sur-Mess (Betteng op der Mess) and Dippach-Gare (Dippech-Gare). Both villages are part of the commune of Dippach.

Bettange-sur-Mess (Luxembourgish: Betten op der Mess) is a small village in the commune of Dippach, in south-western Luxembourg. As of September 2026, the town has a population of 1,461.

It is situated on the Mess River, from which its suffix is derived.
