= Château de Septfontaines =

Buildings and structures in Luxembourg City

Coordinates: 49°37′32″N 06°06′18″E

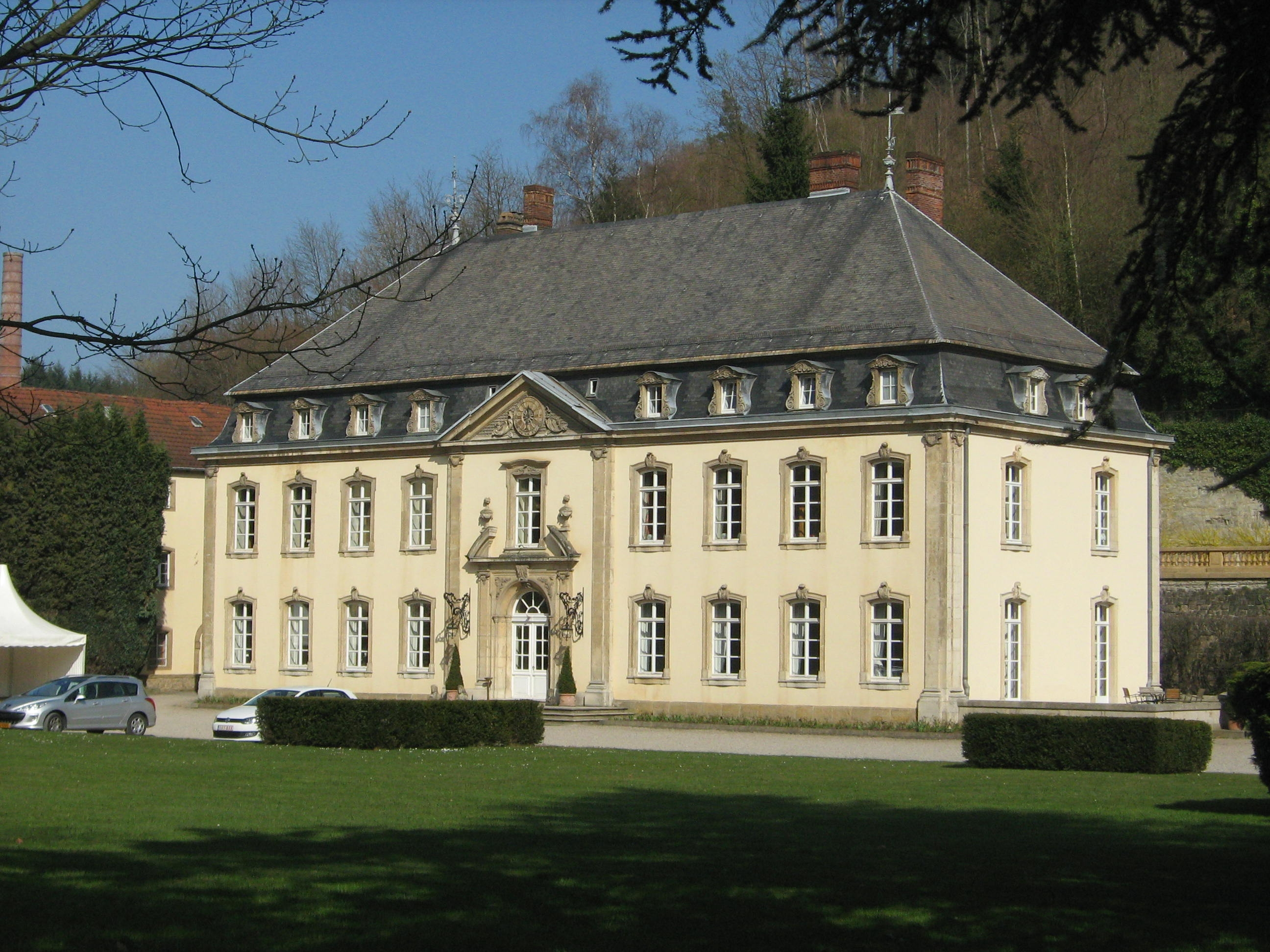
Château de Septfontaines, Luxembourg City

The Château de Septfontaines (Luxembourgish: Schlass Siwebueren) is located in the Rollingergrund district of Luxembourg City. Now a listed building, it has been associated over the years with Luxembourg's Villeroy & Boch porcelain factory, which closed in 2010.

== History ==
The castle was built in 1783–1784 by Jean-François and Pierre-Joseph Boch, who had opened their nearby porcelain factory in 1767, when Luxembourg was part of the Austrian Netherlands. The brothers had chosen Rollingergrund for their factory, as it offered all that was needed: clay, water and wood for the ovens. It was designed so that both their families could live there, which explains why the first floor is divided into two separate sections for the bedrooms, while the rooms on the ground floor, including the dining room and lounge, could be used by both families.

The castle was once occupied by French troops and was sold in 1914. After Luitwin von Boch had acquired it once again in 1970 in the name of Villeroy & Boch, he charged his cousin Antoine de Schorlemer to undertake comprehensive renovation work which lasted a full 12 years.

== The castle today ==
The rooms now testify to the success of the Boch brothers. Porcelain of all shapes and sizes decorates the walls and the windows. In the dining room hangs a portrait of the Austrian empress Maria Theresa (1717–1780), who had allowed them to build their factory in Rollingergrund and who had freed them from taxation for the first ten years. Now available for business conferences and receptions, the building is still used by the management, partners and clients of Villeroy & Boch when they are in Luxembourg.

== See also ==
- Septfontaines Castle in the Valley of the Seven Castles
- List of castles in Luxembourg
