= Mont St. Jean, Luxembourg =

Coordinates: 49.49046°N 6.06033°E

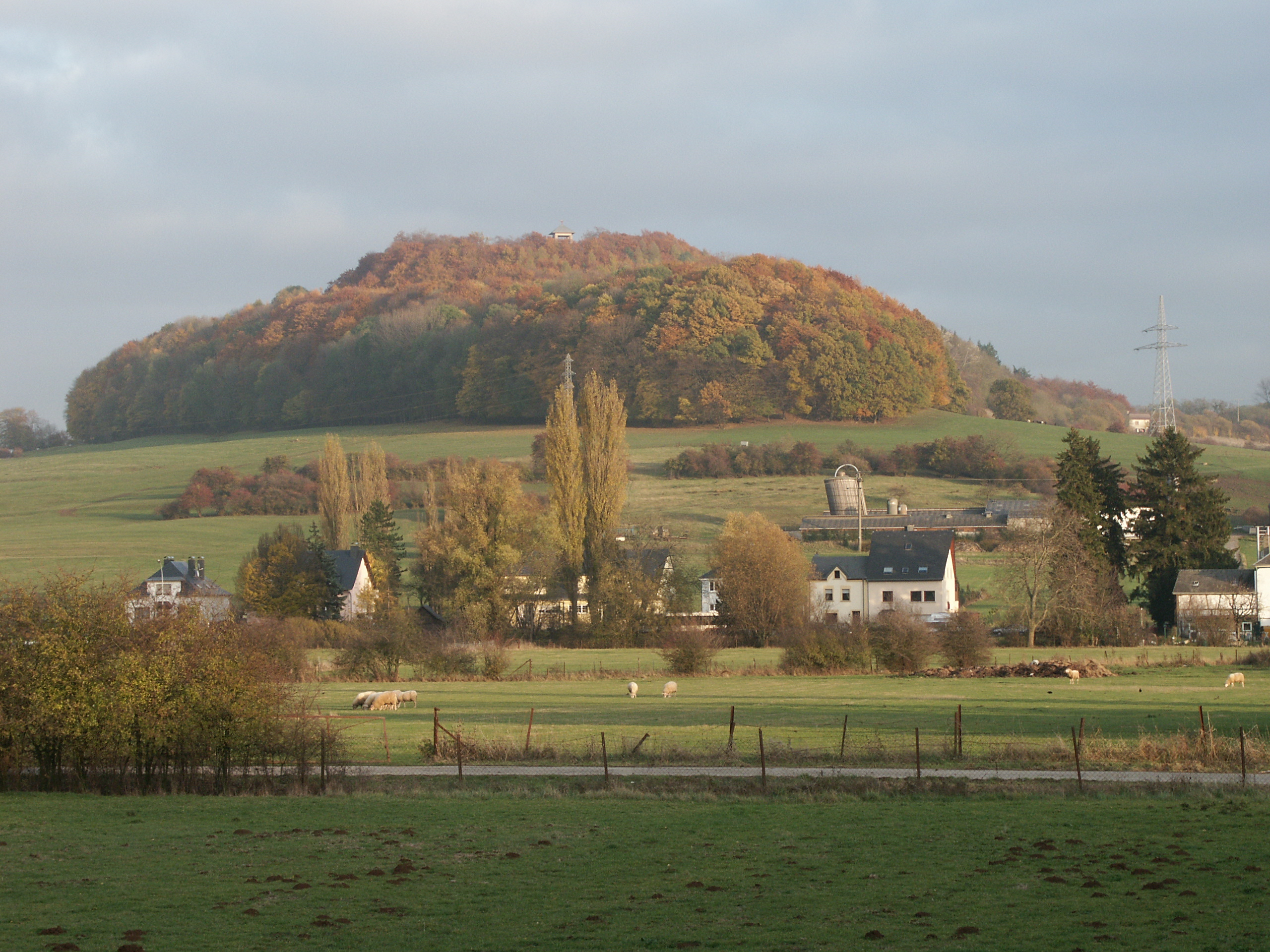
View from Kayl

Mont St. Jean (Luxembourgish: Gehaansbierg, German: Johannisberg) is a hill, castle, and religious site in the commune of Dudelange, in southern Luxembourg. The summit is at 417 metres (1,368 ft).

Mont St. Jean has probably been a point of religious interest since pre-Christian times. The annual pilgrimage to St. John's Chapel, on the summit, on St. John's Eve (23 June) was accompanied in the Middle Ages by ecstatic dancing. The ritualistic dance, a surviving example of which is found at Echternach, was supposedly performed to ward off St. Vitus Dance, but is possibly a relic of pagan times.

A castle and commandery of the Order of St. John were built at Mont St. Jean in the sixteenth century; the site belonged to the von Isenburg family at this time. In 1937, Stations of the Cross were constructed, which are used on St. John's Eve to this day.
