= 2015 Tour de Luxembourg =

2015 UCI Europe Tour

Race details
- Dates: 3–7 June
- Stages: 4 + Prologue
- Distance: 717.57 km (445.9 mi)
- Winning time: 18h 12' 51"

Results
Jersey awarded to the overall winner	Winner	Linus Gerdemann (GER)	(Cult Energy Pro Cycling)
	Second	Marc de Maar (NED)	(Team Roompot)
	Third	Huub Duyn (NED)	(Team Roompot)
Jersey awarded to the points classification winner	Points	André Greipel (GER)	(Lotto–Soudal)
Jersey awarded to the mountains classification winner	Mountains	Fabio Duarte (COL)	(Colombia)
Jersey awarded to the youth classification winner	Youth	Oliver Naesen (BEL)	(Topsport Vlaanderen–Baloise)
	Team	Colombia	

The 2015 Tour de Luxembourg was the 75th edition of the Tour de Luxembourg cycle stage race. It was part of the 2015 UCI Europe Tour as a 2.HC event, and was won by Germany's Linus Gerdemann, riding for the Cult Energy Pro Cycling team.

== Schedule ==
The race was held over five stages, including a prologue on the opening day.

Stage	Date	Course	Distance	Type	Winner	Ref
P	3 June	Luxembourg City	2.67 km (1.7 mi)	Individual time trial	Adrien Petit (FRA)	
1	4 June	Luxembourg City to Clemency	212.6 km (132.1 mi)	Hilly stage	André Greipel (GER)	
2	5 June	Ell to Walferdange	185 km (115.0 mi)	Hilly stage	Linus Gerdemann (GER)	
3	6 June	Eschweiler to Diekirch	161.3 km (100.2 mi)	Hilly stage	André Greipel (GER)	
4	7 June	Mersch to Luxembourg City	156 km (96.9 mi)	Flat stage	Sean De Bie (BEL)	
Total		717.57 km (445.9 mi)				

== Teams ==
15 teams were selected to take place in the 2015 Tour de Luxembourg. Two of these were UCI WorldTeams, ten were UCI Professional Continental teams and three were UCI Continental teams.

UCI WorldTeams

- Lotto–Soudal
- Team Giant–Alpecin

UCI Professional Continental teams

- Cofidis
- Team Europcar
- Bretagne–Séché Environnement
- Wanty–Groupe Gobert
- MTN–Qhubeka
- Topsport Vlaanderen–Baloise
- Colombia
- Team Roompot
- UnitedHealthcare
- Cult Energy Pro Cycling

Continental teams

- Wallonie-Bruxelles
- Differdange–Losch
- Leopard Development Team

== Stages ==
=== Prologue ===
3 June 2015 – Luxembourg City, 2.67 km (1.7 mi), individual time trial (ITT)

Prologue result and General classification after Prologue
Rank	Rider	Team	Time
1	Adrien Petit (FRA)	Cofidis	3' 58"
2	Bryan Coquard (FRA)	Team Europcar	+ 3"
3	Arnaud Gérard (FRA)	Bretagne–Séché Environnement	+ 4"
4	Jimmy Engoulvent (FRA)	Team Europcar	+ 4"
5	Cyril Lemoine (FRA)	Cofidis	+ 6"
6	Ramon Sinkeldam (NED)	Team Giant–Alpecin	+ 7"
7	Alex Kirsch (LUX)	Cult Energy Pro Cycling	+ 7"
8	Edward Theuns (BEL)	Topsport Vlaanderen–Baloise	+ 7"
9	Marcel Sieberg (GER)	Lotto–Soudal	+ 8"
10	Pieter Vanspeybrouck (BEL)	Topsport Vlaanderen–Baloise	+ 8"

=== Stage 1 ===
4 June 2015 – Luxembourg City to Clemency, 212.6 km (132.1 mi)

Stage 1 result
Rank	Rider	Team	Time
1	André Greipel (GER)	Lotto–Soudal	5h 25' 07"
2	Enrico Gasparotto (ITA)	Wanty–Groupe Gobert	+ 0"
3	Daniele Ratto (ITA)	UnitedHealthcare	+ 0"
4	Adrien Petit (FRA)	Cofidis	+ 0"
5	Kristian Sbaragli (ITA)	MTN–Qhubeka	+ 0"
6	Gerald Ciolek (GER)	MTN–Qhubeka	+ 0"
7	Ramon Sinkeldam (NED)	Team Giant–Alpecin	+ 0"
8	Alexander Krieger (GER)	Leopard Development Team	+ 0"
9	Antoine Demoitié (BEL)	Wallonie-Bruxelles	+ 0"
10	Bryan Coquard (FRA)	Team Europcar	+ 0"

General classification after stage 1
Rank	Rider	Team	Time
1	André Greipel (GER)	Lotto–Soudal	5h 29' 04"
2	Adrien Petit (FRA)	Cofidis	+ 1"
3	Bryan Coquard (FRA)	Team Europcar	+ 4"
4	Arnaud Gérard (FRA)	Bretagne–Séché Environnement	+ 5"
5	Jimmy Engoulvent (FRA)	Team Europcar	+ 5"
6	Enrico Gasparotto (ITA)	Wanty–Groupe Gobert	+ 7"
7	Cyril Lemoine (FRA)	Cofidis	+ 7"
8	Ramon Sinkeldam (NED)	Team Giant–Alpecin	+ 8"
9	Alex Kirsch (LUX)	Cult Energy Pro Cycling	+ 8"
10	Edward Theuns (BEL)	Topsport Vlaanderen–Baloise	+ 8"

=== Stage 2 ===
5 June 2015 – Ell to Walferdange, 185 km (115.0 mi)

Stage 2 result
Rank	Rider	Team	Time
1	Linus Gerdemann (GER)	Cult Energy Pro Cycling	4h 50' 43"
2	Marc de Maar (NED)	Team Roompot	+ 0"
3	Jelle Wallays (BEL)	Topsport Vlaanderen–Baloise	+ 37"
4	Huub Duyn (NED)	Team Roompot	+ 37"
5	Miguel Ángel Rubiano (COL)	Colombia	+ 44"
6	Kristian Sbaragli (ITA)	MTN–Qhubeka	+ 47"
7	Oliver Naesen (BEL)	Topsport Vlaanderen–Baloise	+ 47"
8	Fabian Wegmann (GER)	Cult Energy Pro Cycling	+ 47"
9	Florian Vachon (FRA)	Bretagne–Séché Environnement	+ 47"
10	Joël Zangerlé (LUX)	Cult Energy Pro Cycling	+ 47"

General classification after stage 2
Rank	Rider	Team	Time
1	Linus Gerdemann (GER)	Cult Energy Pro Cycling	10h 19' 54"
2	Marc de Maar (NED)	Team Roompot	+ 8"
3	Huub Duyn (NED)	Team Roompot	+ 41"
4	Jelle Wallays (BEL)	Topsport Vlaanderen–Baloise	+ 42"
5	Rudy Molard (FRA)	Cofidis	+ 50"
6	Oliver Naesen (BEL)	Topsport Vlaanderen–Baloise	+ 51"
7	Yoann Bagot (FRA)	Cofidis	+ 54"
8	Florian Vachon (FRA)	Bretagne–Séché Environnement	+ 54"
9	Fabian Wegmann (GER)	Cult Energy Pro Cycling	+ 58"
10	Stijn Steels (BEL)	Topsport Vlaanderen–Baloise	+ 58"

=== Stage 3 ===
6 June 2015 – Eschweiler to Diekirch, 161.3 km (100.2 mi)

Stage 3 result
Rank	Rider	Team	Time
1	André Greipel (GER)	Lotto–Soudal	4h 01' 08"
2	Lars van der Haar (NED)	Team Giant–Alpecin	+ 0"
3	Enrico Gasparotto (ITA)	Wanty–Groupe Gobert	+ 0"
4	Kristian Sbaragli (ITA)	MTN–Qhubeka	+ 0"
5	Christian Mager (GER)	Cult Energy Pro Cycling	+ 0"
6	Kristian Haugaard (DEN)	Leopard Development Team	+ 0"
7	James Vanlandschoot (BEL)	Wanty–Groupe Gobert	+ 0"
8	Alessandro Bazzana (ITA)	UnitedHealthcare	+ 0"
9	Miguel Ángel Rubiano (COL)	Colombia	+ 0"
10	Tony Hurel (FRA)	Team Europcar	+ 0"

General classification after stage 3
Rank	Rider	Team	Time
1	Linus Gerdemann (GER)	Cult Energy Pro Cycling	14h 21' 02"
2	Marc de Maar (NED)	Team Roompot	+ 8"
3	Huub Duyn (NED)	Team Roompot	+ 41"
4	Jelle Wallays (BEL)	Topsport Vlaanderen–Baloise	+ 42"
5	Rudy Molard (FRA)	Cofidis	+ 50"
6	Oliver Naesen (BEL)	Topsport Vlaanderen–Baloise	+ 51"
7	Yoann Bagot (FRA)	Cofidis	+ 54"
8	Florian Vachon (FRA)	Bretagne–Séché Environnement	+ 54"
9	Fabian Wegmann (GER)	Cult Energy Pro Cycling	+ 58"
10	Kristian Sbaragli (ITA)	MTN–Qhubeka	+ 1' 01"

=== Stage 4 ===
7 June 2015 – Mersch to Luxembourg City, 156 km (96.9 mi)

Stage 4 result
Rank	Rider	Team	Time
1	Sean De Bie (BEL)	Lotto–Soudal	3h 51' 06"
2	Leonardo Duque (COL)	Colombia	+ 0"
3	Björn Leukemans (BEL)	Wanty–Groupe Gobert	+ 0"
4	Kenneth Vanbilsen (BEL)	Cofidis	+ 0"
5	Jaco Venter (RSA)	MTN–Qhubeka	+ 2"
6	Kristian Haugaard (DEN)	Leopard Development Team	+ 21"
7	Jimmy Engoulvent (FRA)	Team Europcar	+ 21"
8	Antoine Demoitié (BEL)	Wallonie-Bruxelles	+ 29"
9	Enrico Gasparotto (ITA)	Wanty–Groupe Gobert	+ 37"
10	Florian Vachon (FRA)	Bretagne–Séché Environnement	+ 43"

Final general classification
Rank	Rider	Team	Time
1	Linus Gerdemann (GER)	Cult Energy Pro Cycling	18h 12' 51"
2	Marc de Maar (NED)	Team Roompot	+ 8"
3	Huub Duyn (NED)	Team Roompot	+ 41"
4	Jelle Wallays (BEL)	Topsport Vlaanderen–Baloise	+ 42"
5	Rudy Molard (FRA)	Cofidis	+ 50"
6	Oliver Naesen (BEL)	Topsport Vlaanderen–Baloise	+ 51"
7	Yoann Bagot (FRA)	Cofidis	+ 54"
8	Florian Vachon (FRA)	Bretagne–Séché Environnement	+ 54"
9	Kristian Sbaragli (ITA)	MTN–Qhubeka	+ 1' 01"
10	Miguel Ángel Rubiano (COL)	Colombia	+ 1' 01"

== Classification leadership ==
Stage	Winner	General classification	Points classification	Mountains classification	Young rider classification	Team classification
P	Adrien Petit	Adrien Petit	not awarded	not awarded	Adrien Petit	Cofidis
1	André Greipel	André Greipel	André Greipel	Tom Devriendt	Adrien Petit	Cofidis
2	Linus Gerdemann	Linus Gerdemann	Linus Gerdemann	Fabio Duarte	Oliver Naesen	Cult Energy Pro Cycling
3	André Greipel	Linus Gerdemann	André Greipel	Fabio Duarte	Oliver Naesen	Cult Energy Pro Cycling
4	Sean De Bie	Linus Gerdemann	André Greipel	Fabio Duarte	Oliver Naesen	Colombia
Final		Linus Gerdemann	André Greipel	Fabio Duarte	Oliver Naesen	Colombia

== Final standings ==
Legend
Yellow jersey	Denotes the leader of the General classification	White jersey	Denotes the leader of the Young rider classification
Blue jersey	Denotes the leader of the Points classification	Red jersey	Denotes the leader of the Mountains classification

=== General classification ===
Final general classification
Rank	Rider	Team	Time
1	Linus Gerdemann (GER)	Cult Energy Pro Cycling	18h 12' 51"
2	Marc de Maar (NED)	Team Roompot	+ 8"
3	Huub Duyn (NED)	Team Roompot	+ 41"
4	Jelle Wallays (BEL)	Topsport Vlaanderen–Baloise	+ 42"
5	Rudy Molard (FRA)	Cofidis	+ 50"
6	Oliver Naesen (BEL)	Topsport Vlaanderen–Baloise	+ 51"
7	Yoann Bagot (FRA)	Cofidis	+ 54"
8	Florian Vachon (FRA)	Bretagne–Séché Environnement	+ 54"
9	Kristian Sbaragli (ITA)	MTN–Qhubeka	+ 1' 01"
10	Miguel Ángel Rubiano (COL)	Colombia	+ 1' 01"

=== Young rider classification ===
Final young rider classification
Rank	Rider	Team	Time
1	Oliver Naesen (BEL)	Topsport Vlaanderen–Baloise	18h 13' 42"
2	Kristian Sbaragli (ITA)	MTN–Qhubeka	+ 10"
3	Kévin Ledanois (FRA)	Bretagne–Séché Environnement	+ 1' 01"
4	Georg Preidler (AUT)	Team Giant–Alpecin	+ 1' 02"
5	Antoine Duchesne (CAN)	Team Europcar	+ 1' 36"
6	Maurits Lammertink (NED)	Team Roompot	+ 1' 40"
7	Patrick Olesen (DEN)	Leopard Development Team	+ 2' 01"
8	Angelo Tulik (FRA)	Team Europcar	+ 2' 04"
9	Lars van der Haar (NED)	Team Giant–Alpecin	+ 2' 43"
10	Christian Mager (GER)	Cult Energy Pro Cycling	+ 3' 30"

=== Points classification ===
Final points classification
Rank	Rider	Team	Points
1	André Greipel (GER)	Lotto–Soudal	40
2	Enrico Gasparotto (ITA)	Wanty–Groupe Gobert	31
3	Kristian Sbaragli (ITA)	MTN–Qhubeka	27
4	Linus Gerdemann (GER)	Cult Energy Pro Cycling	20
5	Sean De Bie (BEL)	Lotto–Soudal	20
6	Marc de Maar (NED)	Team Roompot	16
7	Lars van der Haar (NED)	Team Giant–Alpecin	16
8	Leonardo Duque (COL)	Colombia	16
9	Kristian Haugaard (DEN)	Leopard Development Team	14
10	Jelle Wallays (BEL)	Topsport Vlaanderen–Baloise	13

=== Mountains classification ===
Final mountains classification
Rank	Rider	Team	Points
1	Fabio Duarte (COL)	Colombia	39
2	Rodolfo Torres (COL)	Colombia	38
3	Björn Leukemans (BEL)	Wanty–Groupe Gobert	19
4	Patrick Olesen (DEN)	Leopard Development Team	16
5	Jaco Venter (RSA)	MTN–Qhubeka	12
6	Leonardo Duque (COL)	Colombia	12
7	Federico Zurlo (ITA)	UnitedHealthcare	11
8	Sean De Bie (BEL)	Lotto–Soudal	10
9	Laurent Évrard (BEL)	Wallonie-Bruxelles	10
10	Johnny Hoogerland (NED)	Team Roompot	10

=== Teams classification ===
Final teams classification
Rank	Team	Time
1	Colombia	54h 41' 30"
2	Cofidis	+ 17"
3	Team Roompot	+ 28"
4	Cult Energy Pro Cycling	+ 49"
5	Bretagne–Séché Environnement	+ 1' 22"
6	Topsport Vlaanderen–Baloise	+ 1' 39"
7	MTN–Qhubeka	+ 6' 29"
8	Team Giant–Alpecin	+ 6' 58"
9	Team Europcar	+ 7' 56"
10	UnitedHealthcare	+ 9' 07"
