= Roodt =

Roodt may refer to:

- Roodt (surname)
- Roodt, Ell
- Roodt-sur-Eisch
- Roodt-sur-Syre
