= Rued =

Rued may refer to:

== Places ==
- Roodt, Ell, Luxembourg
- Roodt-sur-Eisch, Luxembourg
- Roodt-sur-Syre, Luxembourg

== People ==
- David E. Rued (born 1932), American politician
- Rued Langgaard (1893–1952), Danish composer
