= Rollingen =

Town in Mersch, Luxembourg

Coordinates: 49.74002°N 6.11278°E

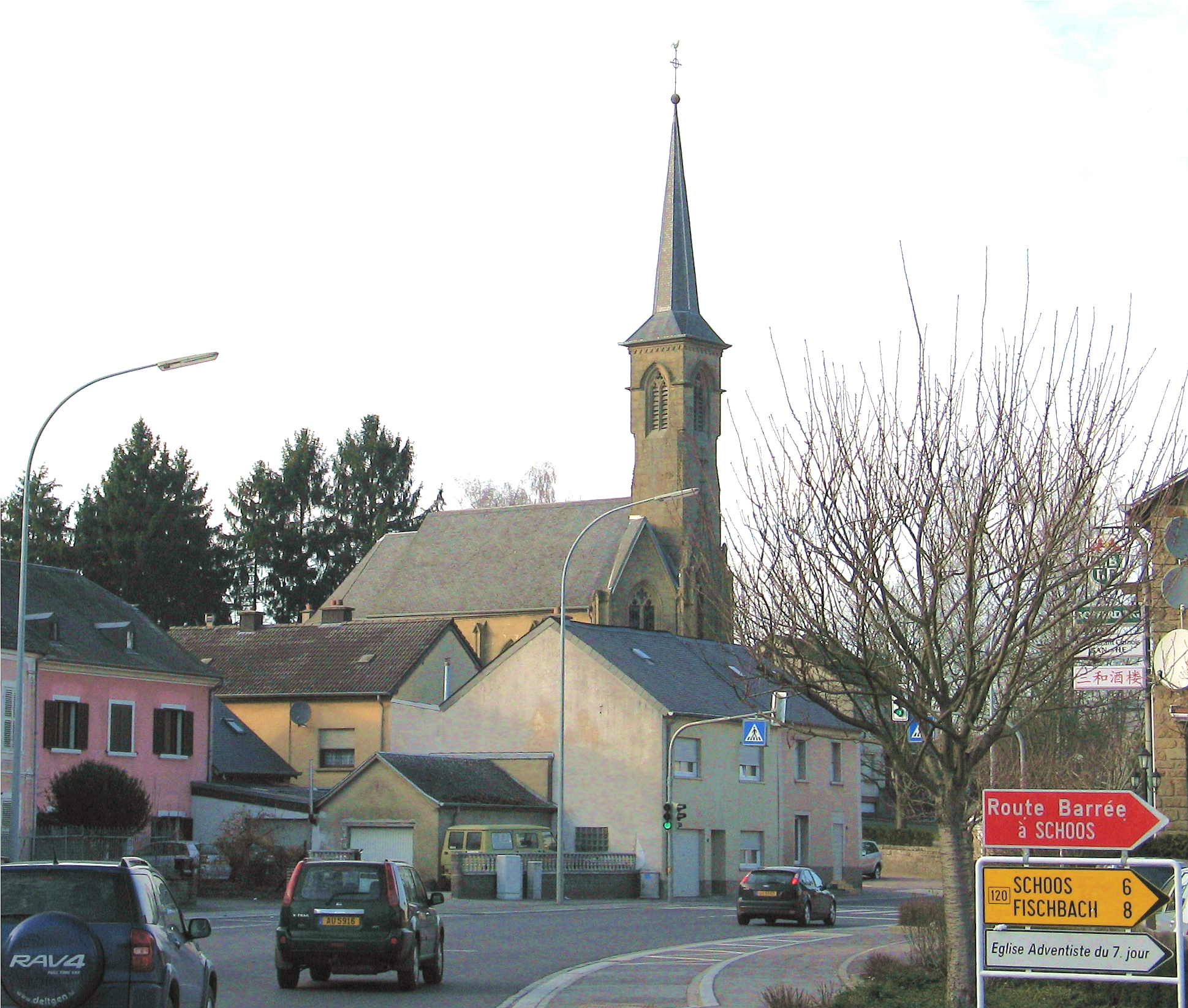

Rollingen (German pronunciation: [ˈʁɔlɪŋən]; Luxembourgish: Rolleng) is a town in the commune of Mersch, in central Luxembourg. As of September 2026, the town has a population of 2,264. The painter Corneille Lentz was born here. Moreover, Rollingen is the hometown of the pro-cyclist Bob Jungels.
