= Pettingen Castle =

Coordinates: 49°46′16″N 06°06′25″E

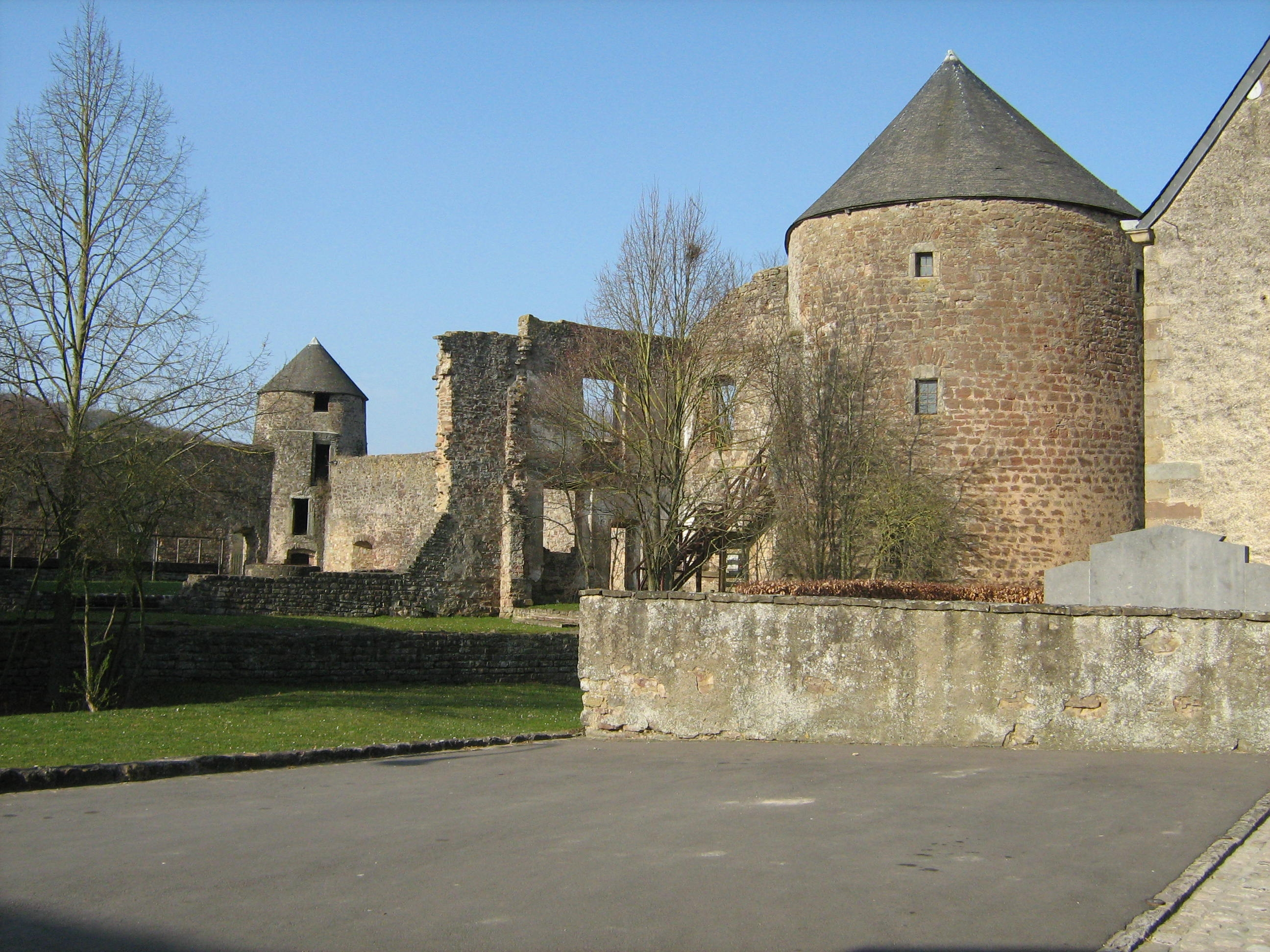
Pettingen Castle

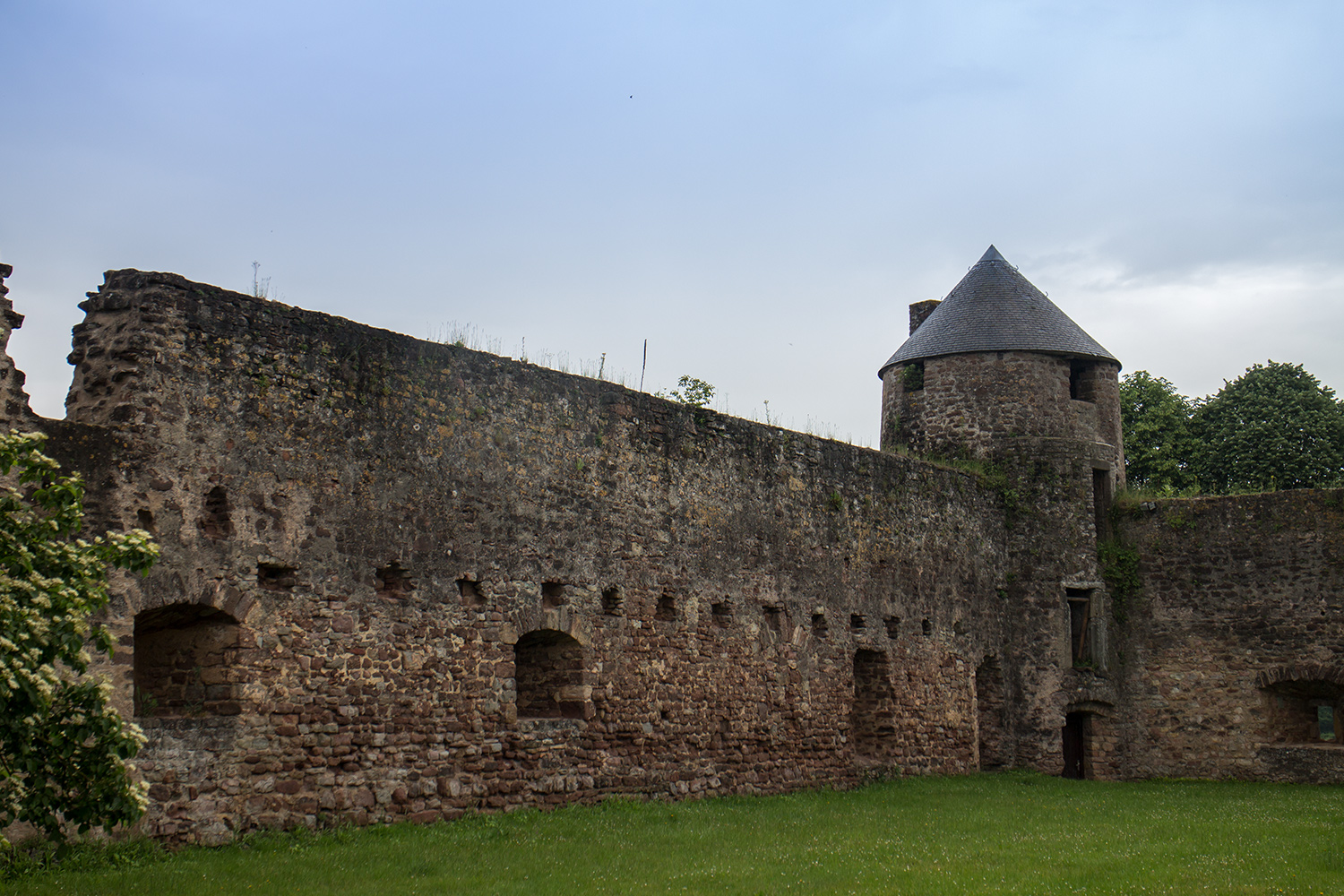
Pettingen castle interior

Pettingen Castle (Luxembourgish: Waasserbuerg Pëtten; French: Château de Pettange) is located in the village of Pettingen some 4 km north of Mersch in central Luxembourg. It is one of the best preserved fortified castles in the country.

== History ==
In the 10th century the fortress was known as Pittigero Mazini but received the name of Pettingen in the 13th century. Towards the end of the Middle Ages, the Lords of Pettingen were important members of Luxembourg society. They were present at Ermesinde's wedding, at the coronation of Henri IV and at the signing of John the Blind's marriage contract.

At the beginning of the 14th century Arnold of Pettingen married Marguerite of Rousy, the great granddaughter of Ermisinde. He had a son, Arnold the Young, whose daughter Irmengard, by marrying Jean de Créhange, associated the Lords of Pettingen with his renowned family. Their grandson, also called Jean, fought for René, the Duke of Lorraine in the war against Charles the Bold, Duke of Burgundy. In revenge, Charles completely destroyed the Castle of Pettingen whose treasures were confiscated by the Governor of Luxembourg in 1494. However, as a result of a decree made at the Great Council of Mechelen in 1503, half of the treasures were returned and the castle was reconstructed in its present form. The four corner towers were added in 1571. In 1684 Louis XIV's troops bombarded the castle, leaving it as it stands today. The ruins, which belonged to the house of Créhange, were inherited by the Comtes de Lapérouse whose descendants sold it to the Duke of Arenberg in 1837. In 1910 his descendant, the Prince of Arenberg, removed everything of value from the castle. In 1920 the southern wall collapsed.

In 1947 the castle was acquired by the State of Luxembourg. Consolidation work was carried out on the walls and on the castle's two towers in 1950.

== The castle today ==
The ruins are open to the public. The ramparts with two round towers on the north-eastern side still stand. The site forms a 30 by 30 metre square surrounded by a former moat 15 metres wide fed by the Weillerbach which flowed into the River Alzette.

== Gallery ==
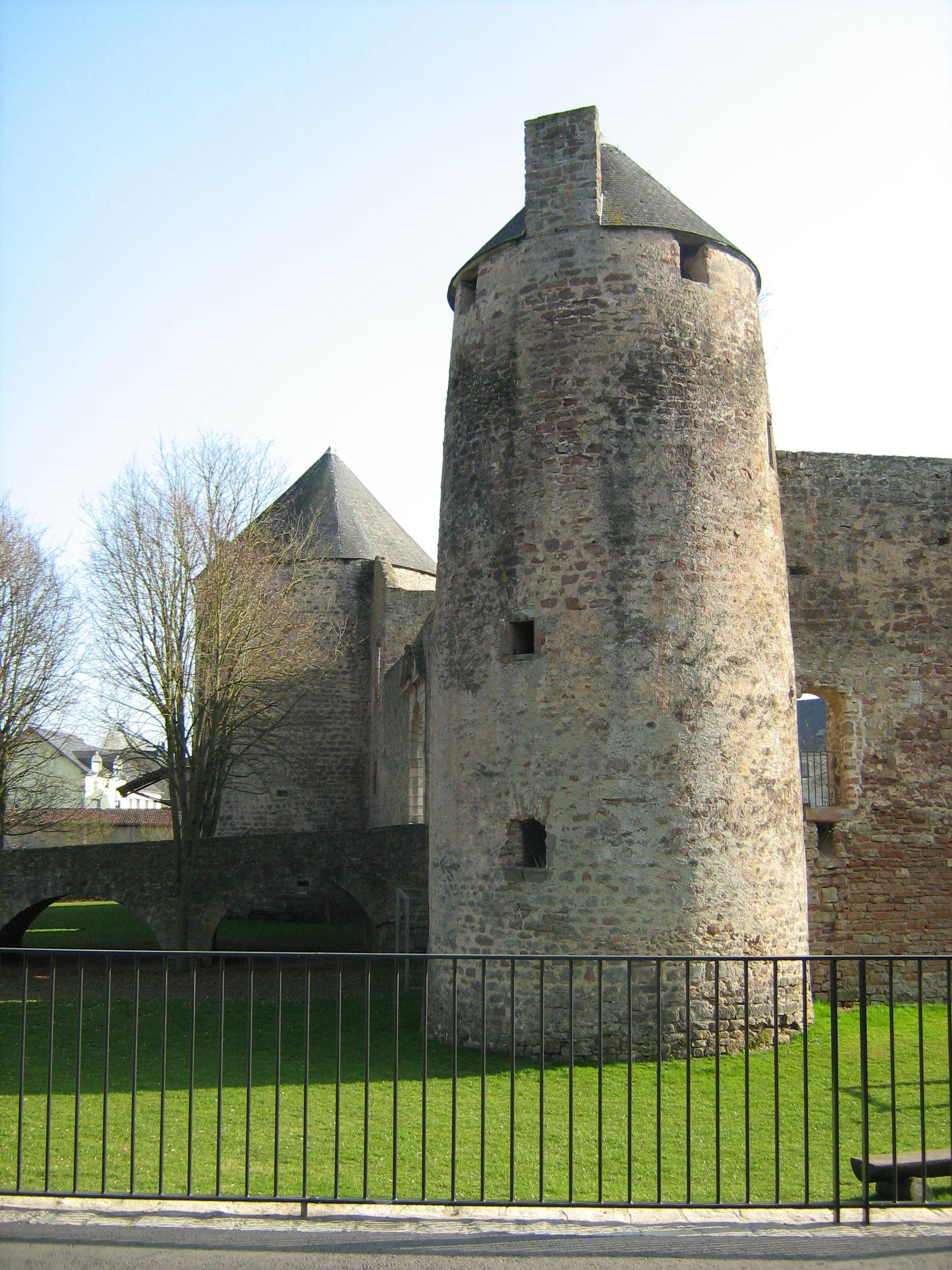
The two remaining round towers

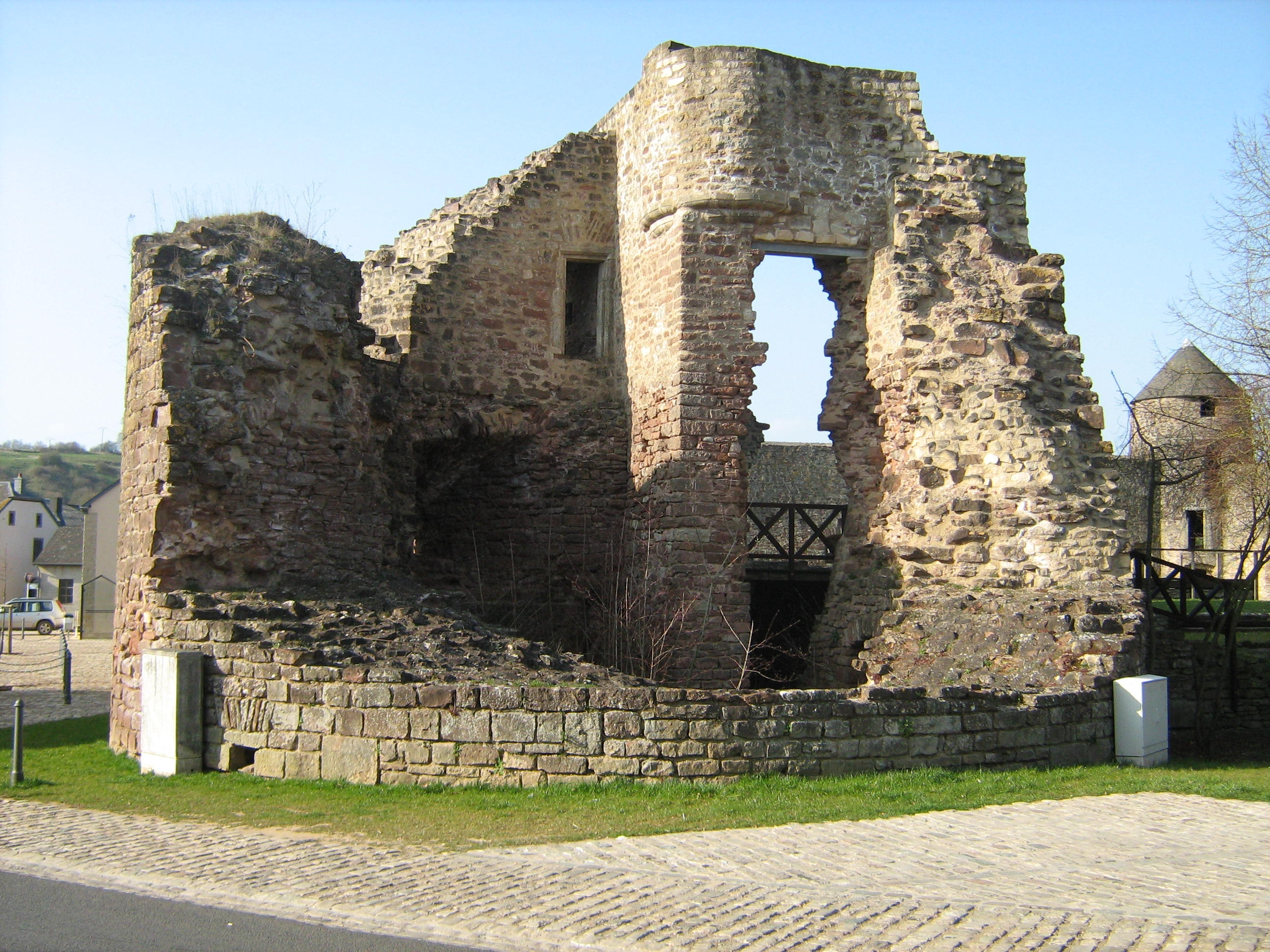
Ruins of a corner tower

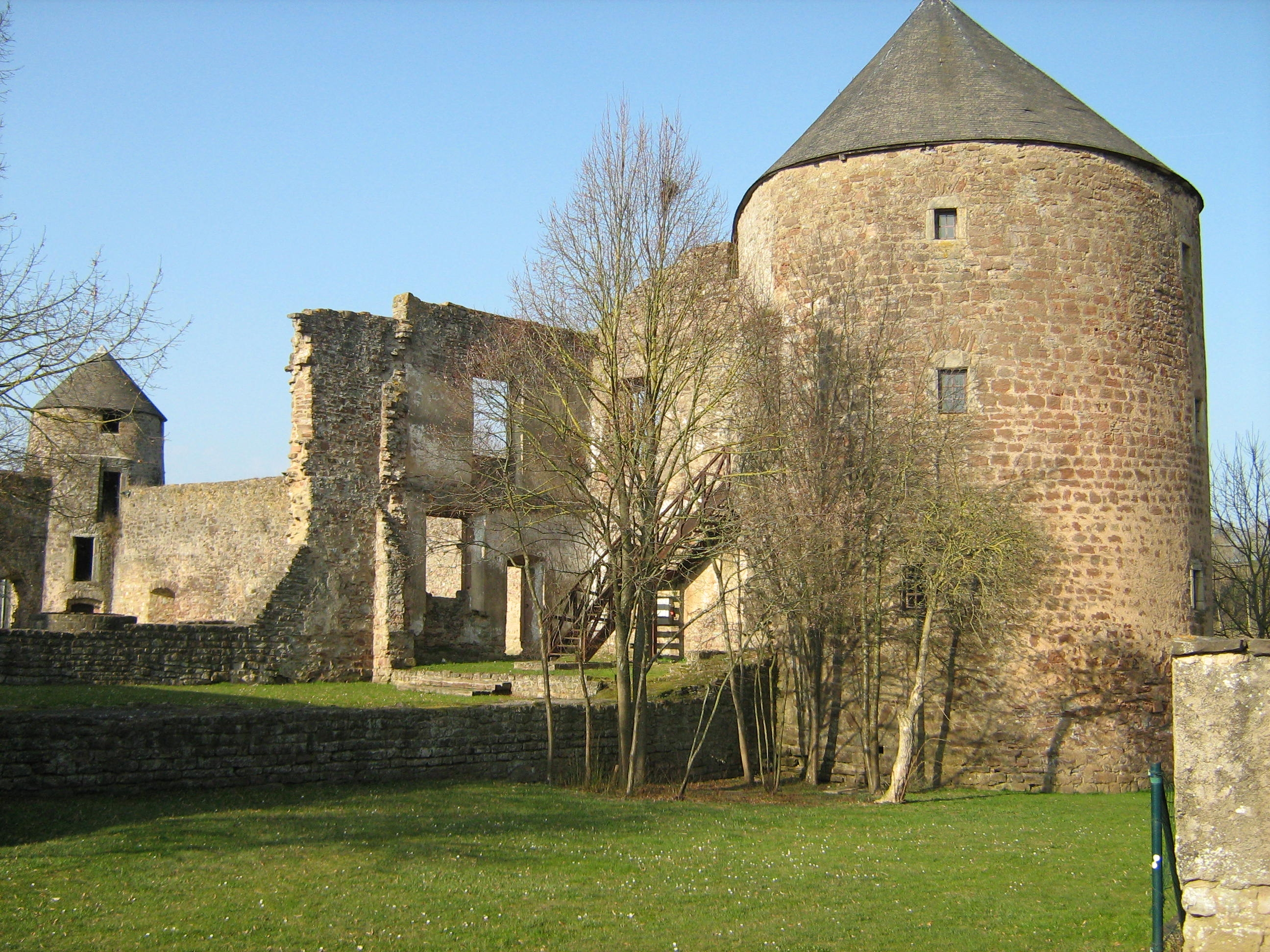
From the south-west

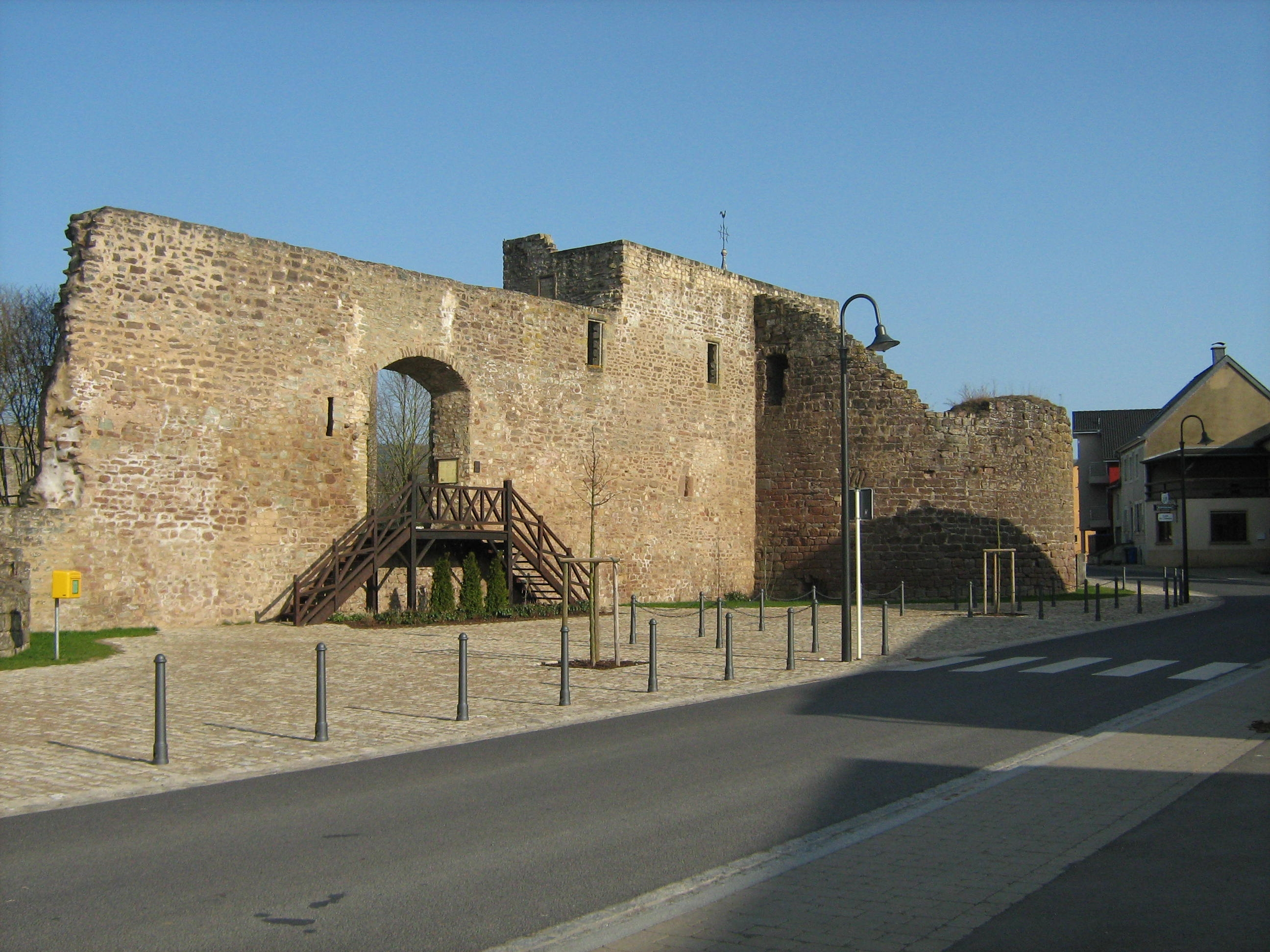
The western perimeter

== See also ==
- List of castles in Luxembourg
