= Corneille Lentz =

Luxembourgish painter

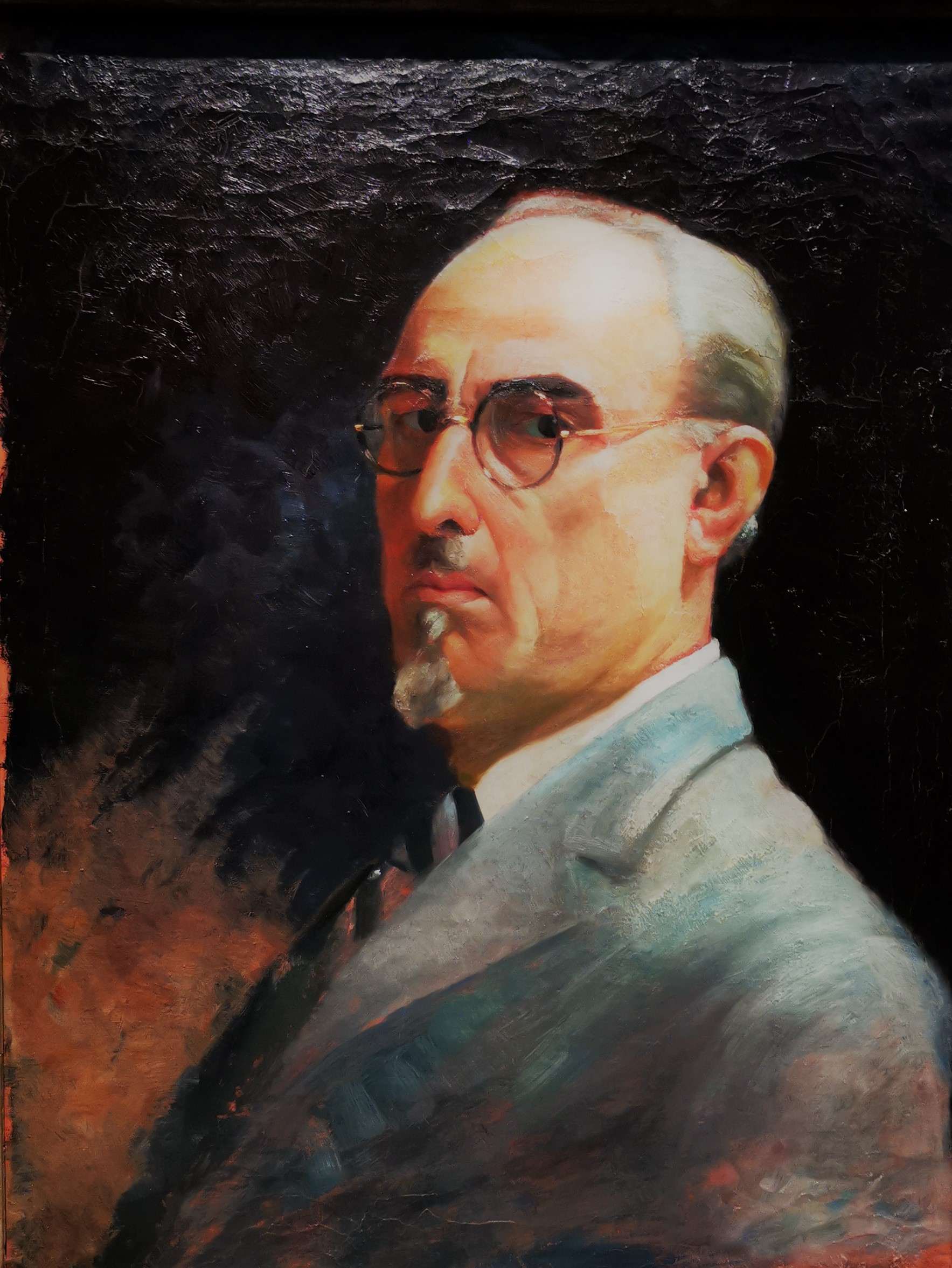
- Born: 20 July 1879; Rollingen, Luxembourg
- Died: 10 March 1937 (aged 57); Luxembourg, Luxembourg
- Occupation: Painter

Corneille Lentz (20 July 1879 – 10 March 1937) was a Luxembourgish painter. His work was part of the painting event in the art competition at the 1932 Summer Olympics.
