= Reckange =

Town in Luxembourg

Coordinates: 49.75157°N 6.08581°E

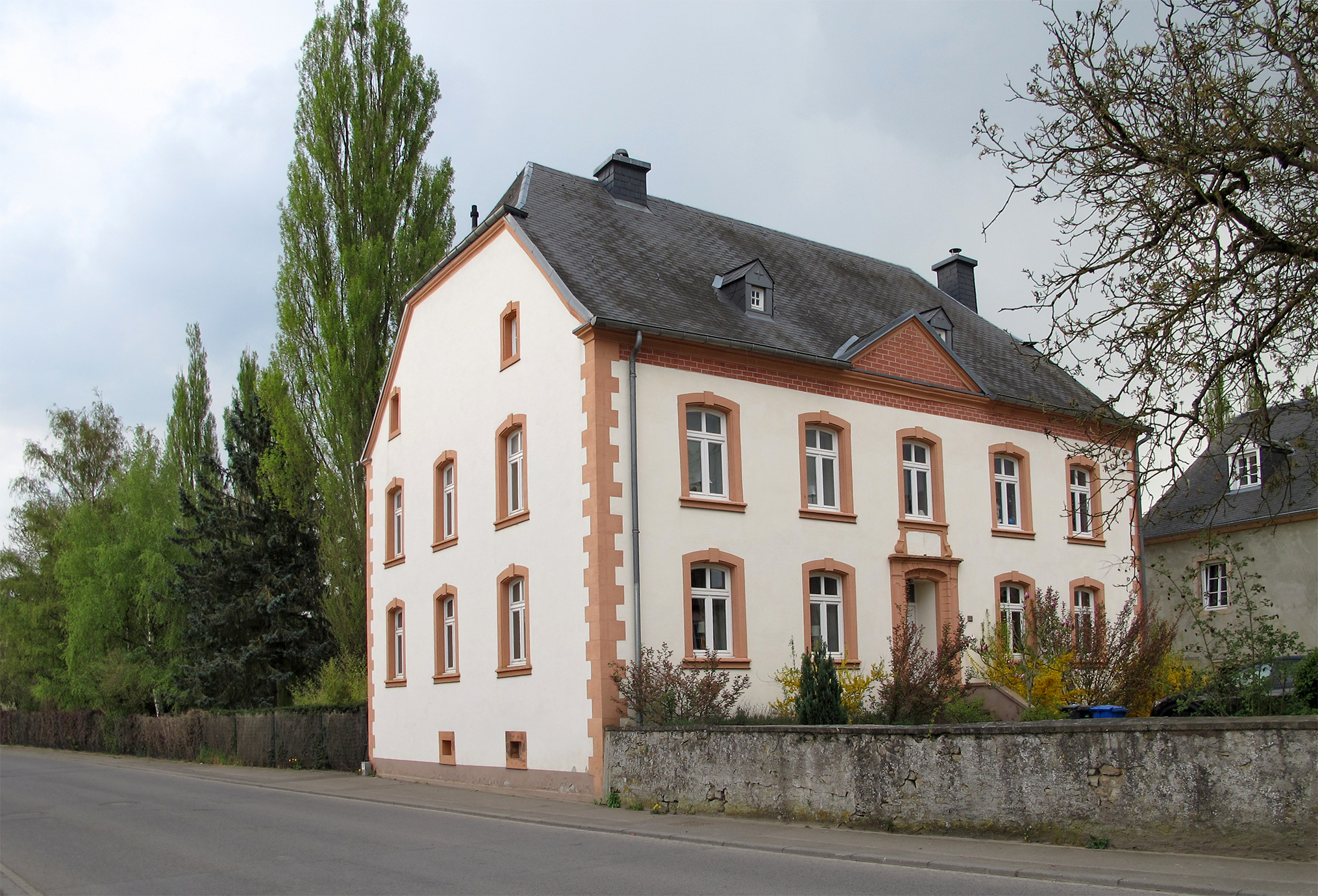
Building on Reckange Main Street

Reckange (Luxembourgish: Recken, German: Reckingen) is a small town in the commune of Mersch, in central Luxembourg. As of September 2026, the town has a population of 1,090.

The nearby Menhir of Beisenerbierg is a Neolithic age standing-stone.
