= Roodt (surname) =

Roodt is a surname. Notable people with the surname include:

- Dan Roodt (born 1957), South African author, publisher, and commentator
- Darrell Roodt (born 1962), South African film director, screenwriter and producer
- Hendrik Roodt (born 1987), South African rugby union player
- Liana Roodt, South African surgeon
