= Development Team Giant–Shimano =

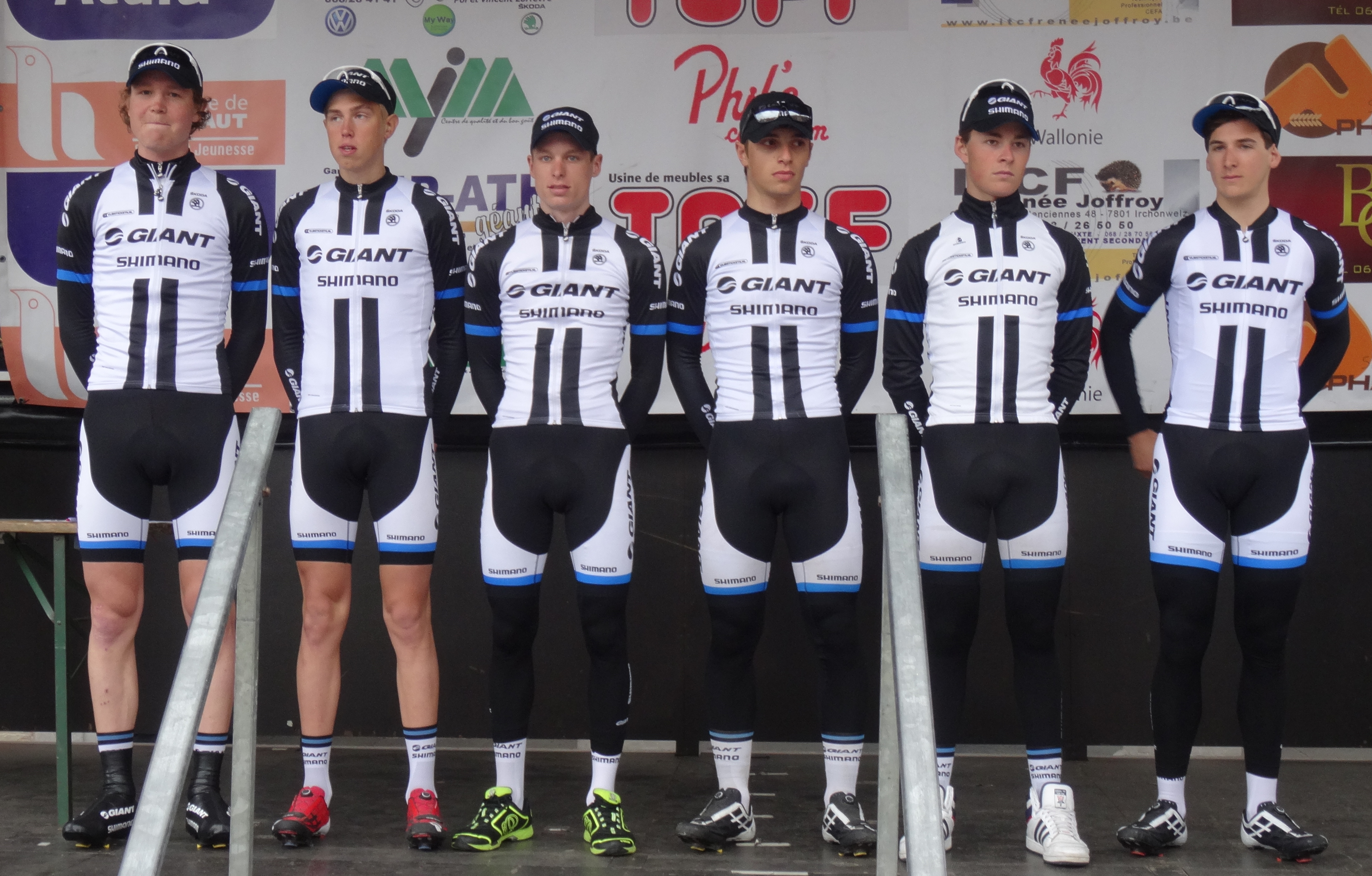

Team information
- UCI code: GID
- Registered: Sweden
- Founded: 2014
- Disbanded: 2014
- Discipline: Road
- Status: UCI Continental
- Bicycles: Giant

Key personnel
- General manager: Aike Visbeek
- Team managers: Jens Lang; Dirk Reuling

Team name history
- 2014: Development Team Giant–Shimano

The Development Team Giant–Shimano was a Swedish UCI Continental cycling team that existed only for the 2014 season. It served as a development team for the UCI WorldTeam of the same name, Giant–Shimano.

== Team roster ==
Rider	Date of birth
Christian Bertilsson (SWE)	5 September 1991 (age 35)
Jenthe Biermans (BEL)	30 October 1995 (age 30)
Jan Brockhoff (GER)	3 December 1994 (age 31)
Alex Frame (NZL)	18 June 1993 (age 33)
Kristian Haugaard (DEN)	27 February 1991 (age 35)

Rider	Date of birth
Fredrik Ludvigsson (SWE)	28 April 1994 (age 32)
Robert Pölder (SWE)	21 June 1991 (age 35)
Mathias Rask (DEN)	18 October 1995 (age 30)
Maximilian Schachmann (GER)	9 January 1994 (age 32)
Lars van der Haar (NED)	21 July 1991 (age 35)
