= Pettingen =

Village in Mersch, Luxembourg

Coordinates: 49°46′N 6°07′E

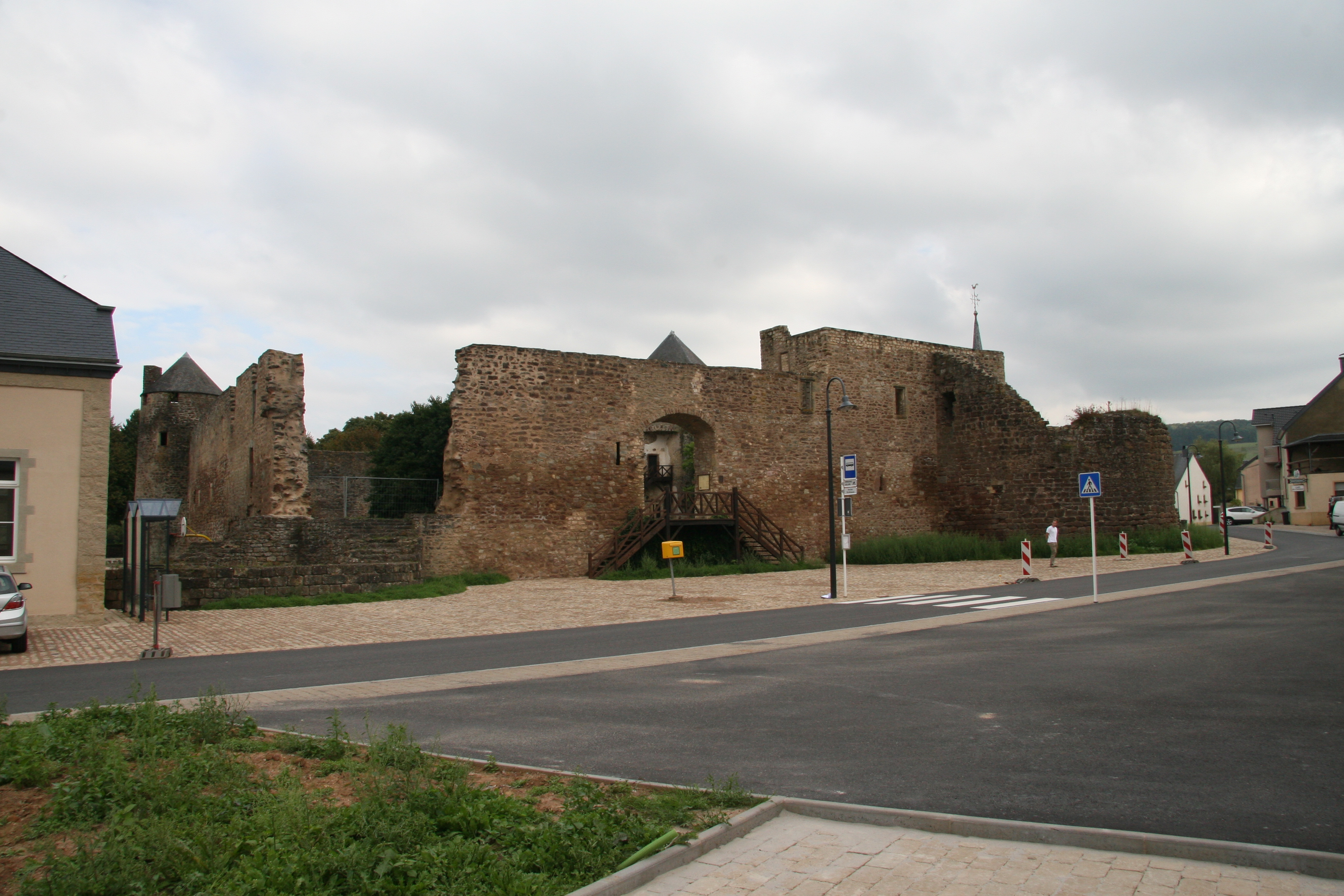
Pettingen

Pettingen (German pronunciation: [ˈpɛtɪŋən]; Luxembourgish: Pëtten) is a village in the commune of Mersch, in central Luxembourg. As of September 2026, the village had a population of 253.

Pettingen Castle in the center of the village is one of the best-preserved fortified castles in the country.

== See also ==
- List of villages in Luxembourg
