= Petit-Nobressard =

Village in Luxembourg

Coordinates: 49°46′45″N 5°48′38″E

Petit-Nobressard Kleng Elchert
- Village
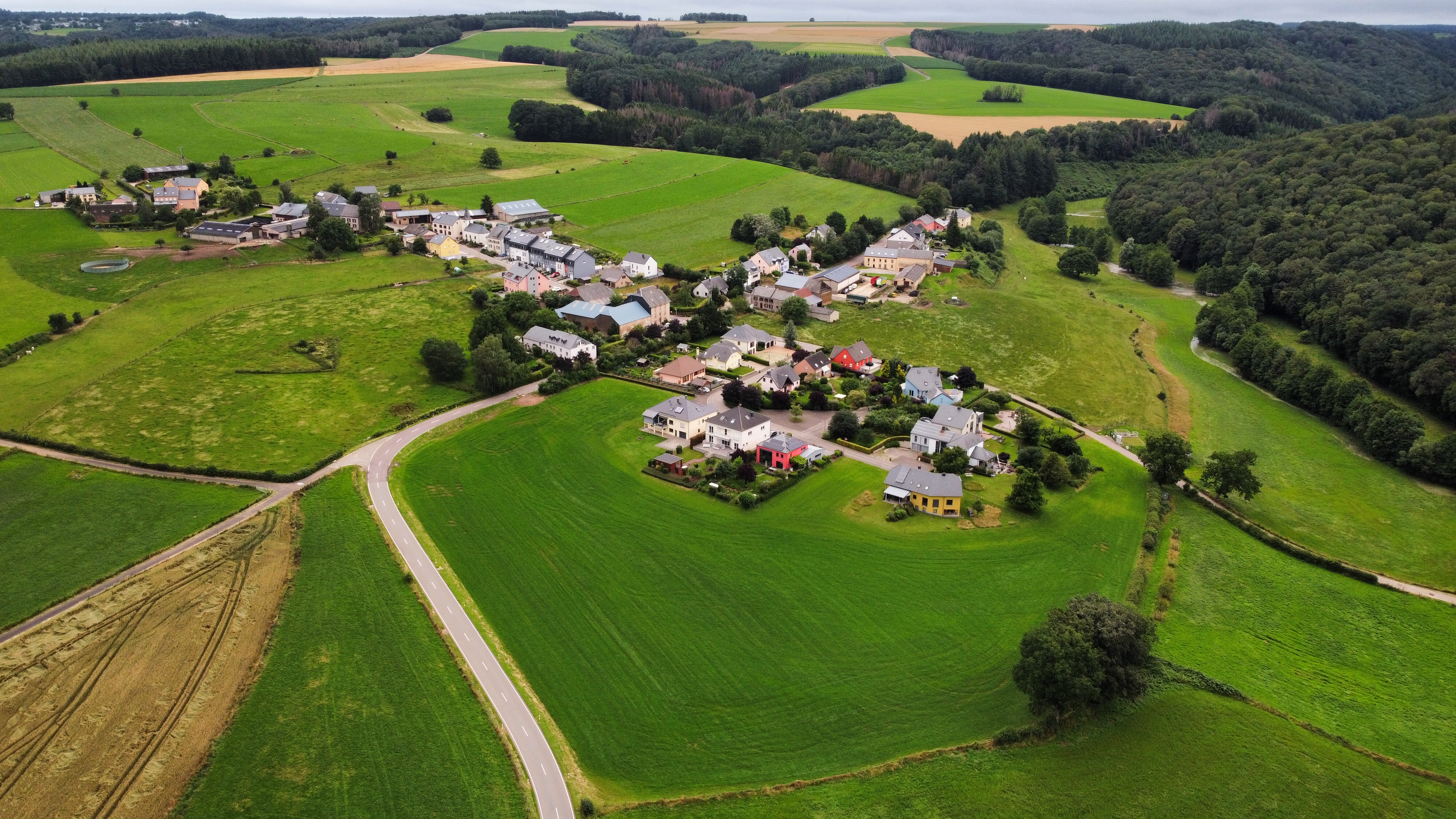
- Aerial view of Petit-Nobressard
- Interactive map of Petit-Nobressard
- Country: Luxembourg
- Canton: Redange
- Commune: Ell, Luxembourg

Population
  - Total: 184
- Time zone: UTC+1 (CET)
  - Summer (DST): UTC+2 (CEST)

Petit-Nobressard (Luxembourgish: Kleng Elchert) is a village in northwestern Luxembourg.

It is situated in the commune of Ell and has a population of 183 as of September 2026.

== Gallery ==
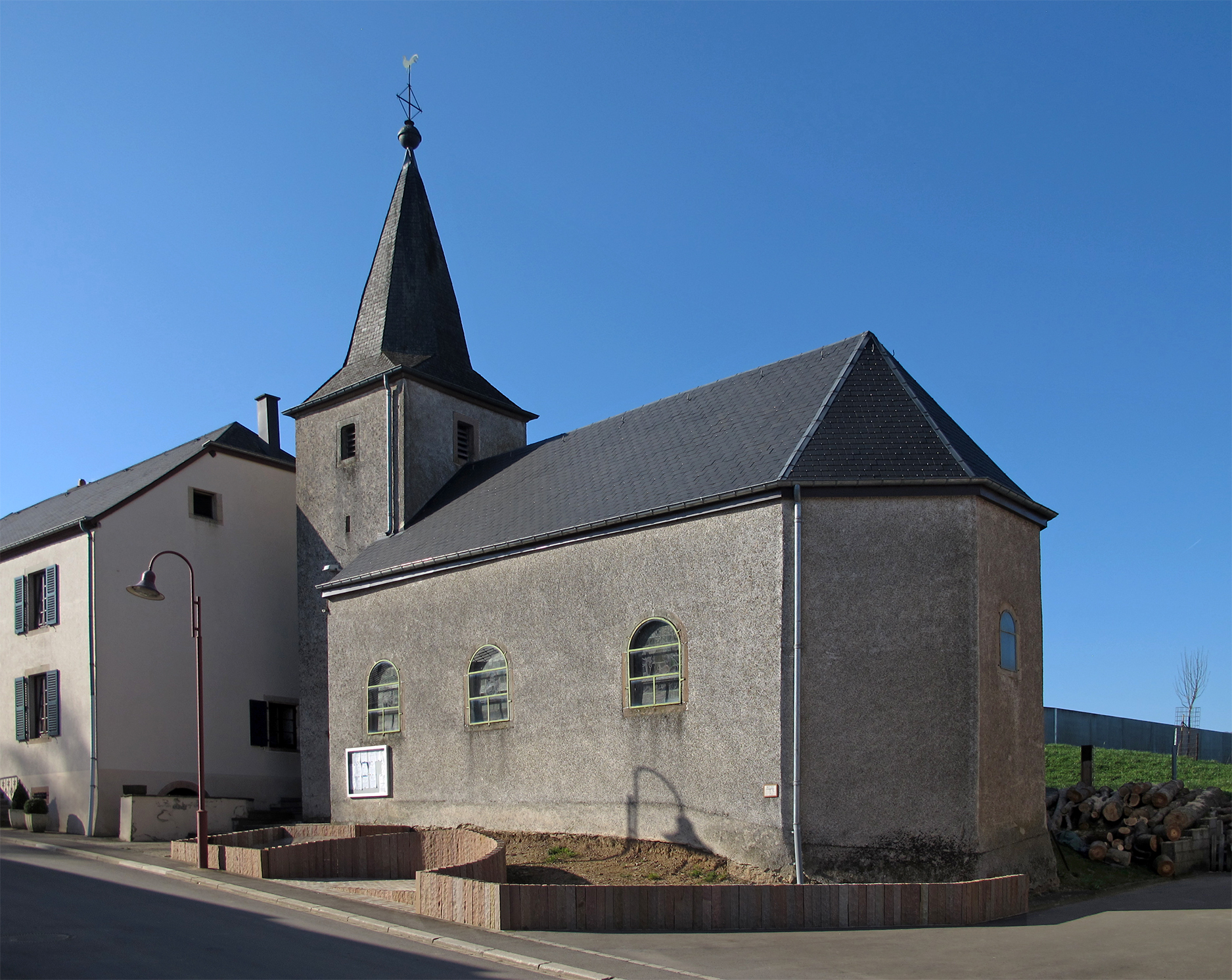
Church in Petit-Nobressard
