= Menhir of Beisenerbierg =

Standing stone at Reckange, Luxembourg

- Menhir vu Recken
- Menhir de Reckingen
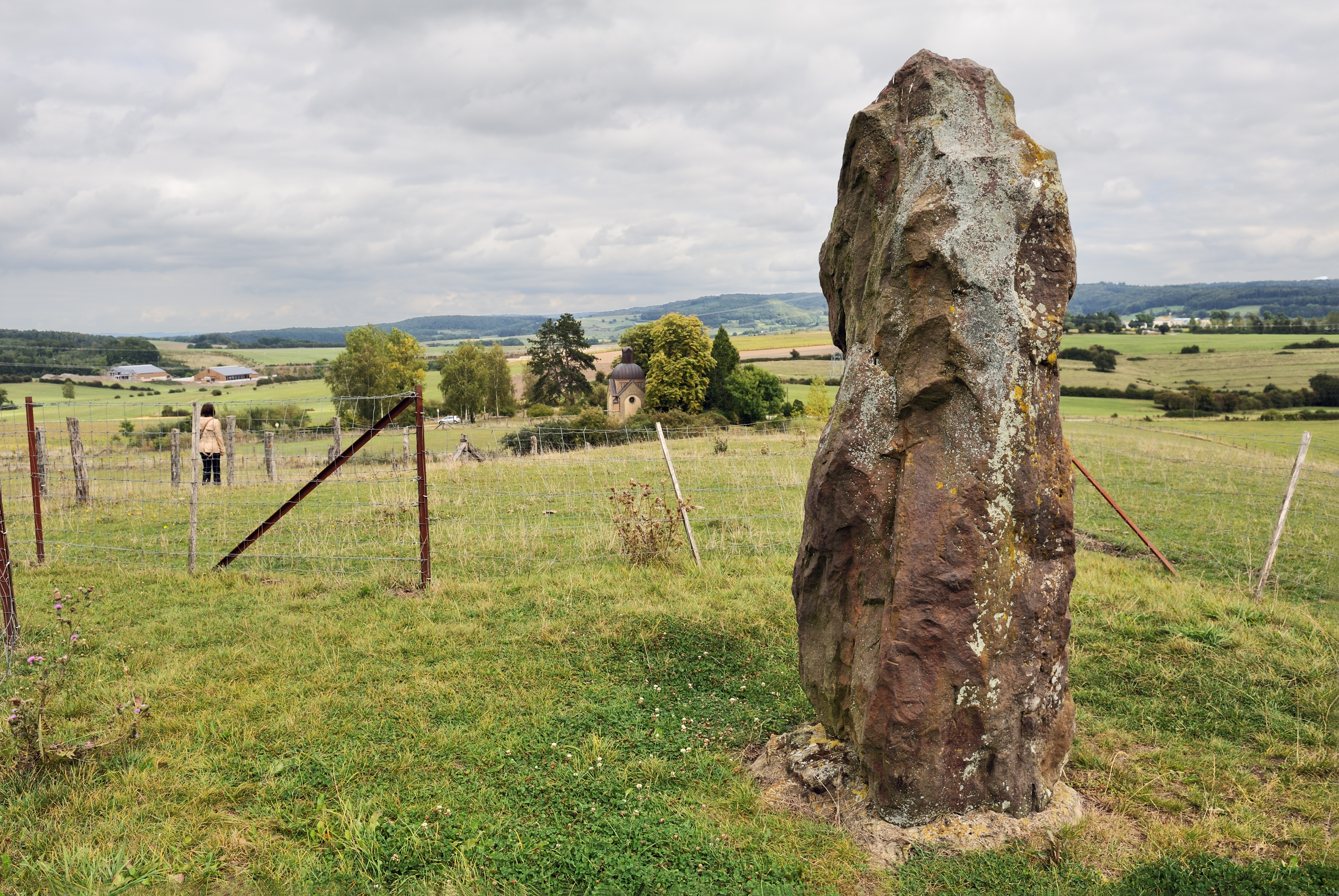
- Menhir of Beisenerbierg

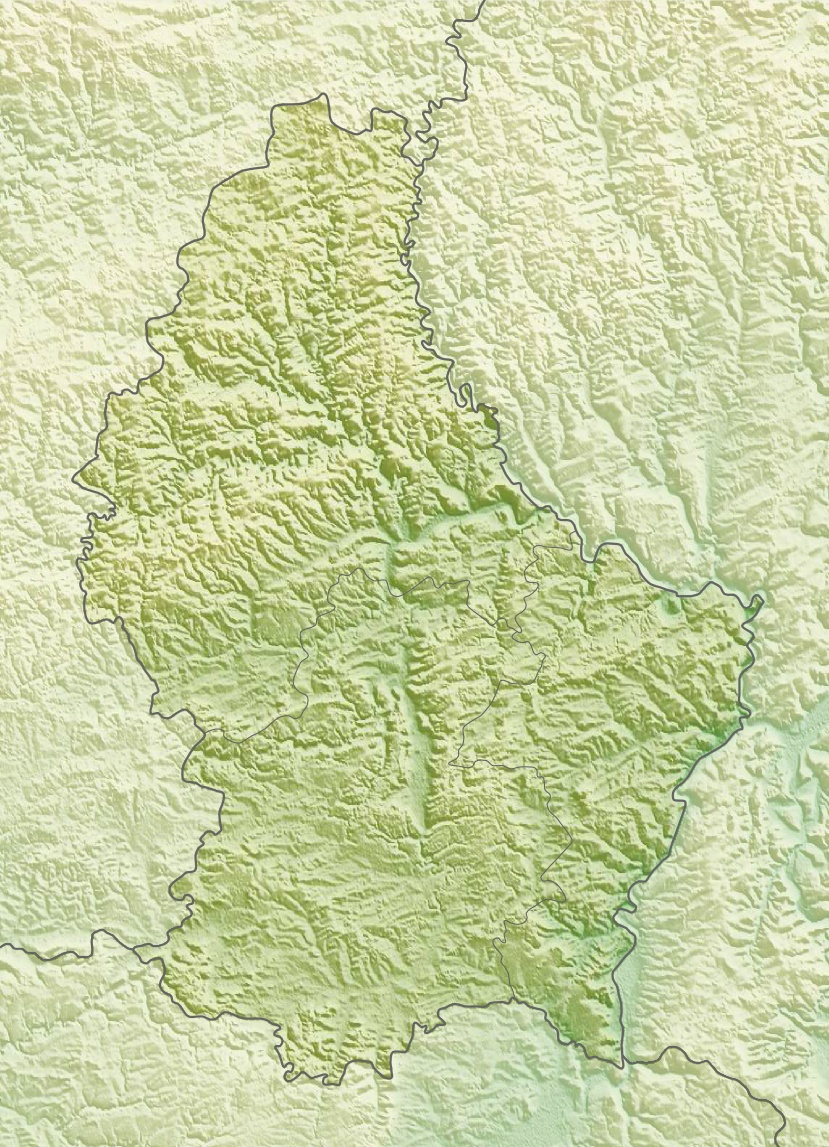
- Location within Luxembourg
- 49.75918°N 6.07603°E
- Type: Standing stone
- Periods: Neolithic
- Location: Reckange
- Region: Luxembourg

The Menhir of Beisenerbierg is a three-metre-tall (9.8 ft) standing stone which stands on a hilltop at Reckange (Luxembourgish: Recken; German: Reckingen) in the Grand Duchy of Luxembourg. An excavation in 2001 revealed its age to be Neolithic.

== Description ==
The standing stone, or "menhir", is three metres (9.8 ft) high, 0.7 metres (2 ft 4 in) wide, and weighs around four tonnes (3.9 long tons; 4.4 short tons). It is made from sandstone and owes its yellow-brown colour to its high iron content. It appears to have been shaped to give it an "anthropomorphic" form.

== History ==
The stone was buried for centuries until 1978 when it was identified by members of the "Friends of Old Mersch" association. It was re-erected 30 metres (98 ft) from its original location. In 2001, an archaeological excavation was undertaken by the National Museum. The excavations which uncovered the original foundation pit confirmed the antiquity of this megalithic monument, and showed it to be Neolithic.
