= Jan Brockhoff =

German bicycle racer (born 1994)

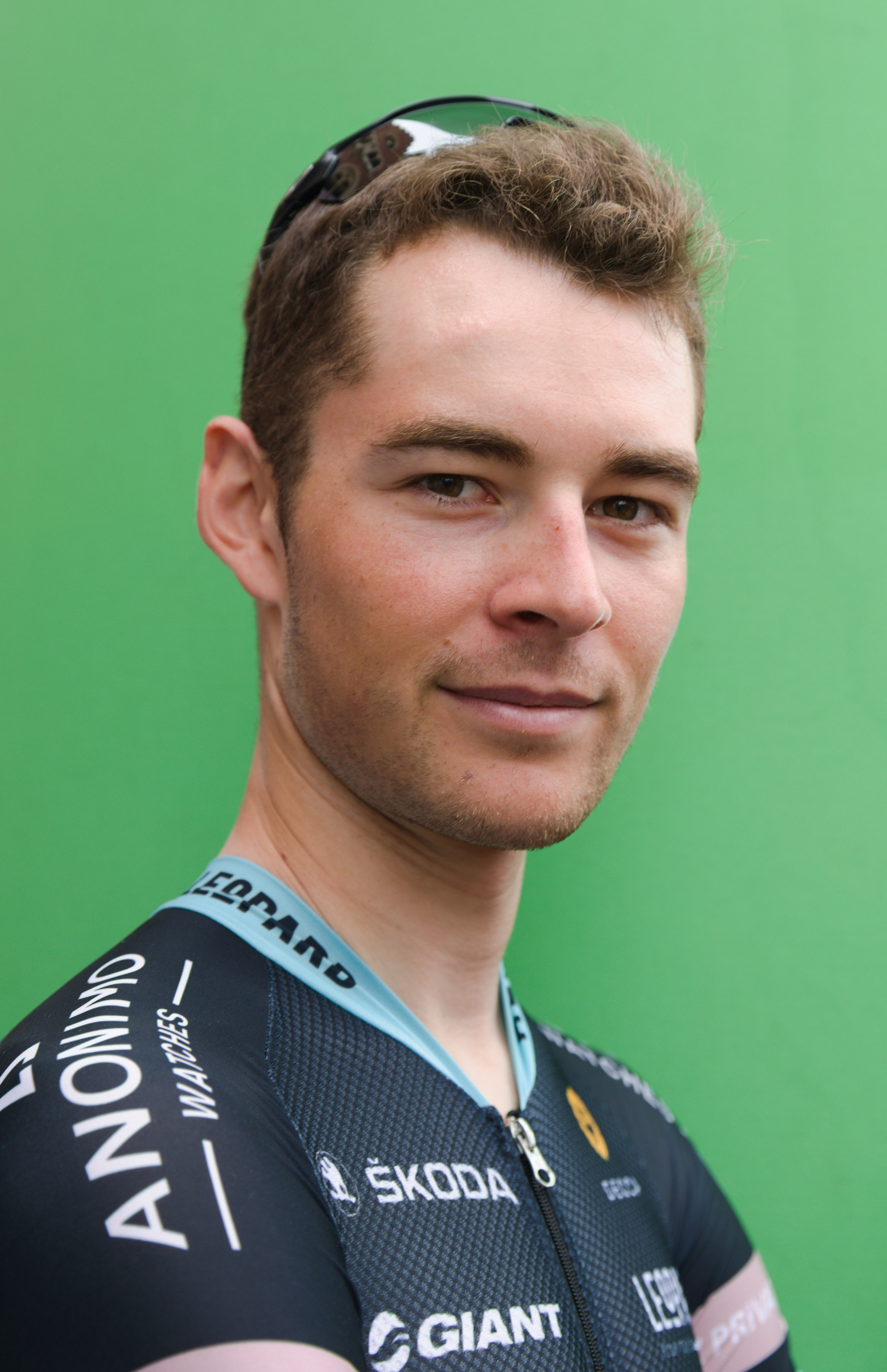
- Brockhoff in 2018.

Personal information
- Full name: Jan Brockhoff
- Born: 3 December 1994 (age 31) Hildesheim, Germany

Cycling career
- Sport: Cycling
- Current team: Leopard TOGT Pro Cycling
- Discipline: Road
- Role: Rider (retired); Directeur sportif

Professional teams
- 2013: Thüringer Energie Team
- 2014: Development Team Giant–Shimano
- 2015: AWT–GreenWay
- 2016–2018: Leopard Pro Cycling

Managerial team
- 2019–: Leopard Pro Cycling

Jan Brockhoff (born 3 December 1994 in Hildesheim) is a German former cyclist, who rode professionally between 2013 and 2018 for the Thüringer Energie Team, Development Team Giant–Shimano, AWT–GreenWay and the Leopard Pro Cycling teams. He now works as a directeur sportif for UCI Continental team Leopard TOGT Pro Cycling.

== Major results ==
2012
1st Road race, National Junior Road Championships
2014
1st Stage 5 Tour Alsace
2015
4th Overall Carpathian Couriers Race

1st Prologue

6th Liège–Bastogne–Liège U23
8th Vuelta a La Rioja
2016
9th Overall Tour de Normandie
2017
7th Grand Prix Criquielion
7th Grand Prix de la ville de Nogent-sur-Oise
8th Antwerpse Havenpijl
10th Overall Le Triptyque des Monts et Châteaux
