= Colpach-Bas =

Village in Ell, Luxembourg

Coordinates: 49°45′N 5°50′E

Colpach-Bas Nidderkolpech Niedercolpach
- Village
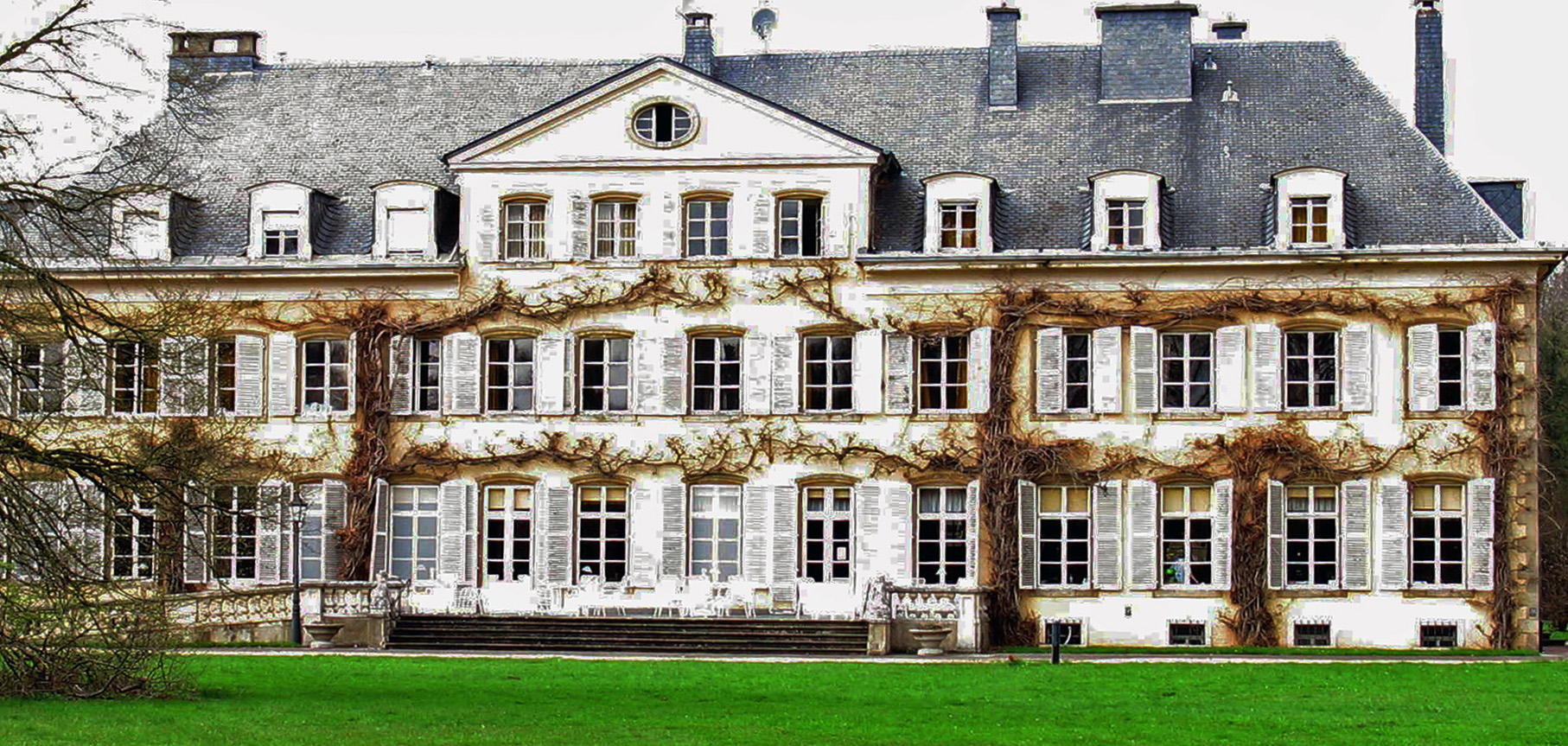
- The Colpach Castle

- Location within Luxembourg
- Country: Luxembourg
- Commune: Ell

Population (2024)
  - Total: 147
- Time zone: UTC+1 (CET)
  - Summer (DST): UTC+2 (CEST)

Colpach-Bas (Luxembourgish: Nidderkolpech, German: Niedercolpach) is a village in the commune of Ell, in western Luxembourg. As of September 2026, the village has a population of 131.

Colpach Castle dates from the beginning of the 14th century when it was a stronghold. It was adapted as a manor house in the 18th century. Today it is a convalescent centre run by the Red Cross.
