= Mersch Castle =

Castle in Luxembourg

Coordinates: 49°44′52″N 06°6′11″E

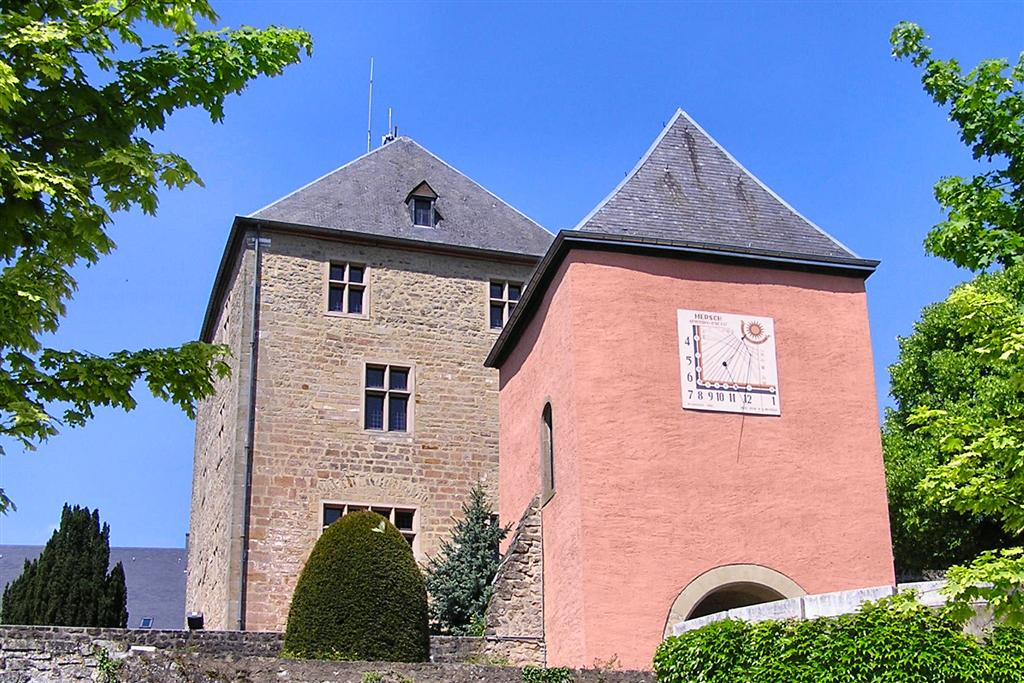
Mersch Castle

Mersch Castle (Luxembourgish: Schlass Miersch; French: Château de Mersch) in central Luxembourg is one of the castles belonging to the Valley of the Seven Castles. Located in the centre of Mersch, its history goes back to the 13th century. Today the castle houses the administrative offices of the local commune.

== History ==
The castle was built in the 13th century by Theodoric, a knight in the service of Countess Ermesinde of Luxembourg. It was captured and burnt down by the Burgundians. In 1574, Paul von der Veltz transformed the building into a comfortable castle in the Renaissance style. The keep had large windows and the property was surrounded by a protective wall with seven towers. Finely vaulted ceilings were erected over the rooms on the ground floor and the first floor. The Knights' Hall on the second floor has a magnificent chimney. The arms of 16 noblemen decorated the walls. In 1603, the castle was again destroyed by the Dutch. In 1635, during the Thirty Years' War, the castle and the village were left in a sorry state. However, around 1700, it was once again repaired, this time by Johann-Friedrich von Elter who rebuilt the gate and appended his coat of arms. The chapel was restored in 1717 by von Elter. The altar bears the arms of the castle's heiress, Charlotte von Elter.

In 1898, the Sonnenberg-Reinach family sold the castle to a businessman called Schwartz-Hallinger. In 1930, restoration work was carried out by the owner M. Uhres. In 1938, a youth hostel was housed in a new building adjacent to the castle. From 1957, the commune acquired the building but sold it to the State of Luxembourg in 1960. As a result of an exchange agreement, the commune finally regained ownership in 1988 and undertook substantial renovation work for the needs of itse administrative services which now occupy the building.

== See also ==
- List of castles in Luxembourg
