= Ell, Luxembourg =

Commune in Redange canton, Luxembourg

Ell Ell
- Commune
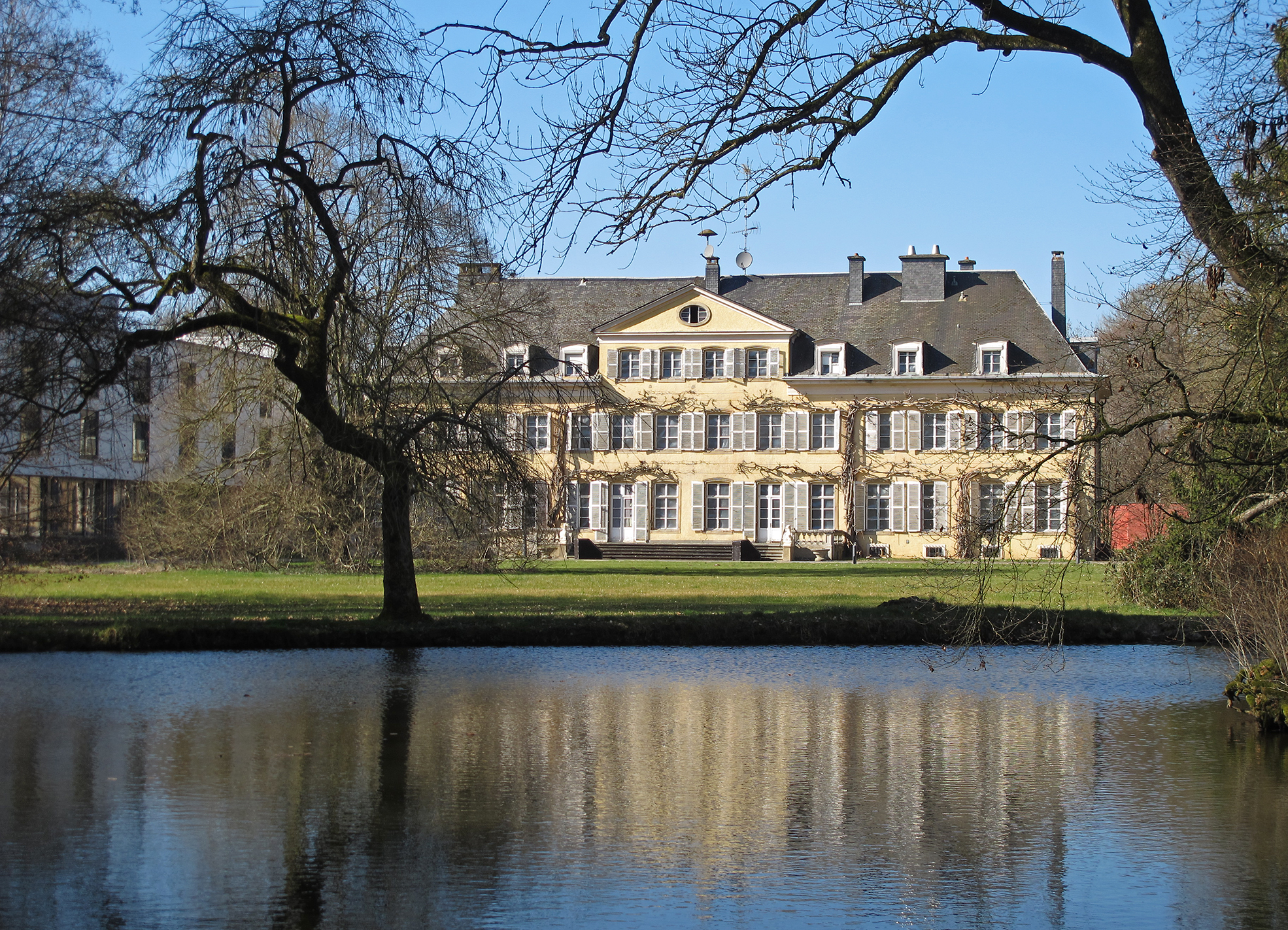
- Colpach Castle

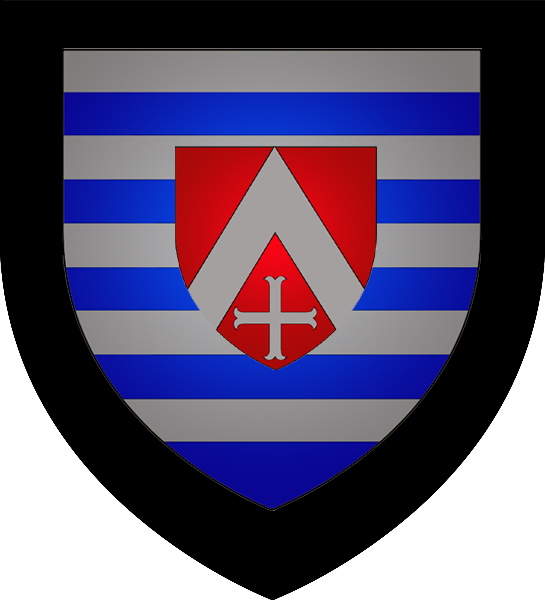
- Coat of arms

- Map of Luxembourg with Ell highlighted in orange, and the canton in dark red
- Coordinates: 49.7667°N 5.85°E
- Country: Luxembourg
- Canton: Redange

Government
  - Mayor: Henri Rasqué

Area
  - Total: 21.55 km^{2} (8.32 sq mi)
  - Rank: 48th of 100
- Highest elevation: 508 m (1,667 ft)
  - Rank: 18th of 100
- Lowest elevation: 268 m (879 ft)
  - Rank: 72nd of 100

Population (2026)
  - Total: 1,706
  - Rank: 89th of 100
  - Density: 79.16/km^{2} (205.0/sq mi)
  - Rank: 78th of 100
- Time zone: UTC+1 (CET)
  - Summer (DST): UTC+2 (CEST)
- LAU 2: LU0000703
- Website: ell.lu

Ell is a commune and small town in western Luxembourg, in the canton of Redange. It lies close to the border with Belgium.

As of September 2026, the town of Ell, which lies in the south-east of the commune, has a population of 652. Other towns and villages within the commune include Colpach-Bas, Colpach-Haut, Roodt, and Petit-Nobressard.

== Population ==
Historical population

Year	Pop.	±%
1821	788	—
1851	1,215	+54.2%
1900	947	−22.1%
1910	880	−7.1%
1922	814	−7.5%
1935	780	−4.2%

Year	Pop.	±%
1947	679	−12.9%
1960	618	−9.0%
1970	590	−4.5%
1981	559	−5.3%
1990	601	+7.5%
2000	763	+27.0%

Year	Pop.	±%
2005	925	+21.2%
2010	1,081	+16.9%
2015	1,235	+14.2%
2020	1,425	+15.4%
2021	1,511	+6.0%

Source data
