= Moesdorf =

Town in Mersch, Luxembourg

Coordinates: 49°46′N 6°07′E

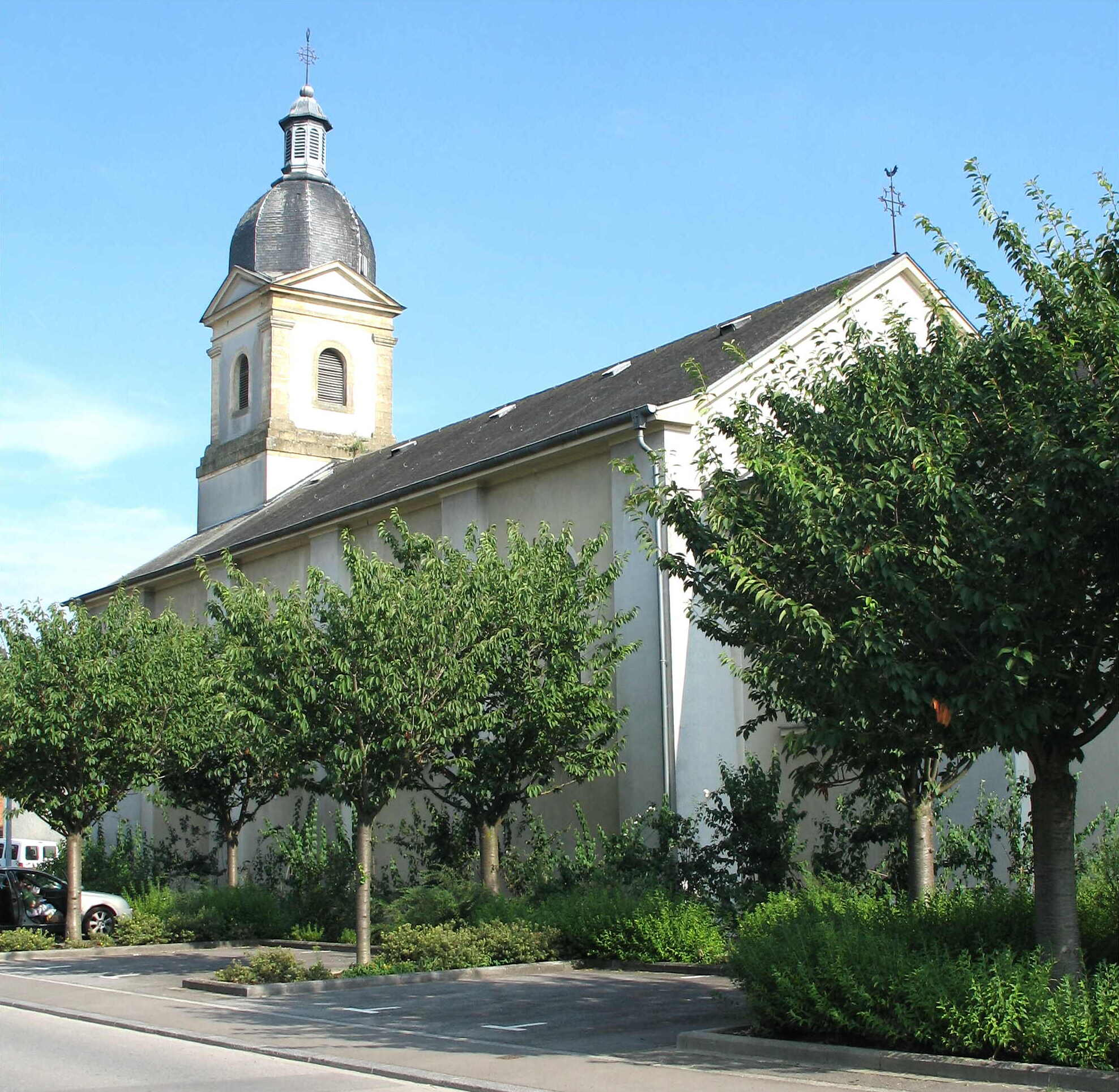
The church in Moesdorf

Moesdorf (Luxembourgish: Miesdref) is a small town in the commune of Mersch, in central Luxembourg. As of September 2026, the town has a population of 534.

== Notable people ==
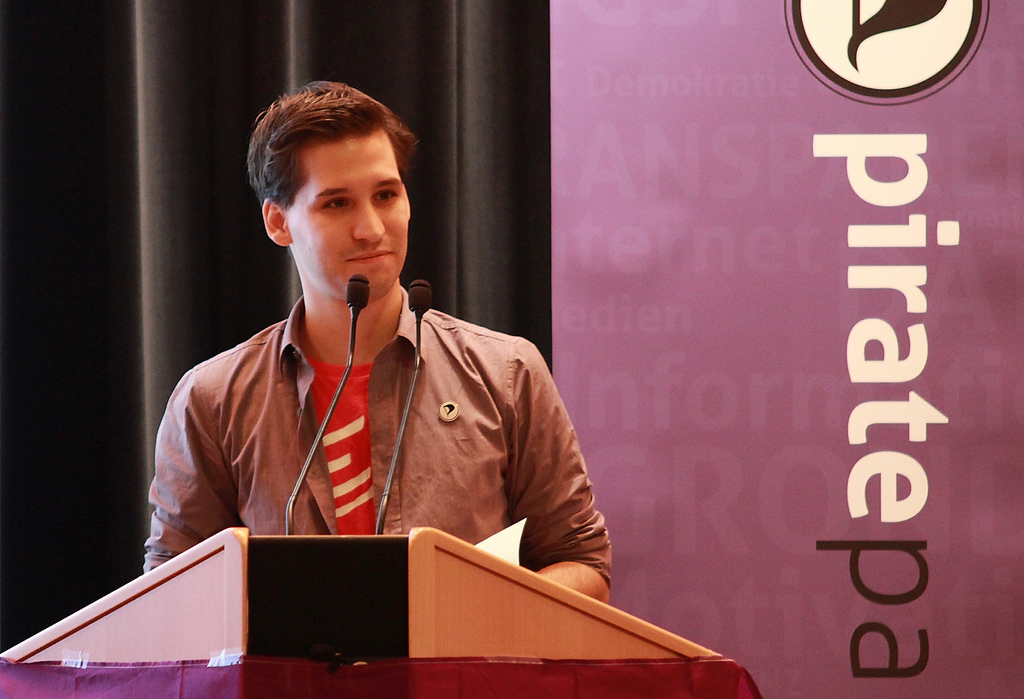
Luxembourgish Politician, Jerry Weyer

- Jerry Weyer (born 1986), politician, activist, and lawyer
