= Liana Roodt =

South African surgeon

- Born: South Africa
- Education: University of Stellenbosch
- Known for: Functional analysis; operator theory
- Scientific career
- Fields: Mathematics
- Workplaces: University of Stellenbosch

Liana Roodt is a South African specialist general surgeon and a surgical consultant in the Surgical Breast and Endocrine Unit and the trauma center at Groote Schuur Hospital, Cape Town.

== Career ==
Roodt created Project Flamingo in 2010, a non-profit that addresses the wait time breast cancer patients face in the public health care sector. In 2010, she found that many operating rooms were empty on weekends and public holidays, so she started to raise funds in order to schedule and then pay for surgeries for patients during those times. It took her three years to get the permissions and regulations in place.

In 2017, more than 100 people with breast cancer benefited from the free mastectomies made possible by Dr. Roodt and her nonprofit. They have facilities both at Groote Schuur and at Tygerberg hospital in Parow, Cape Town. She works with a volunteer team of 10 surgeons, 10 anesthesiologists and 10 volunteers.

She has been named one of ten “Inspirational women to know in South Africa” from The Culture Trip.
