= Mersch =

Mersch Miersch
- Commune
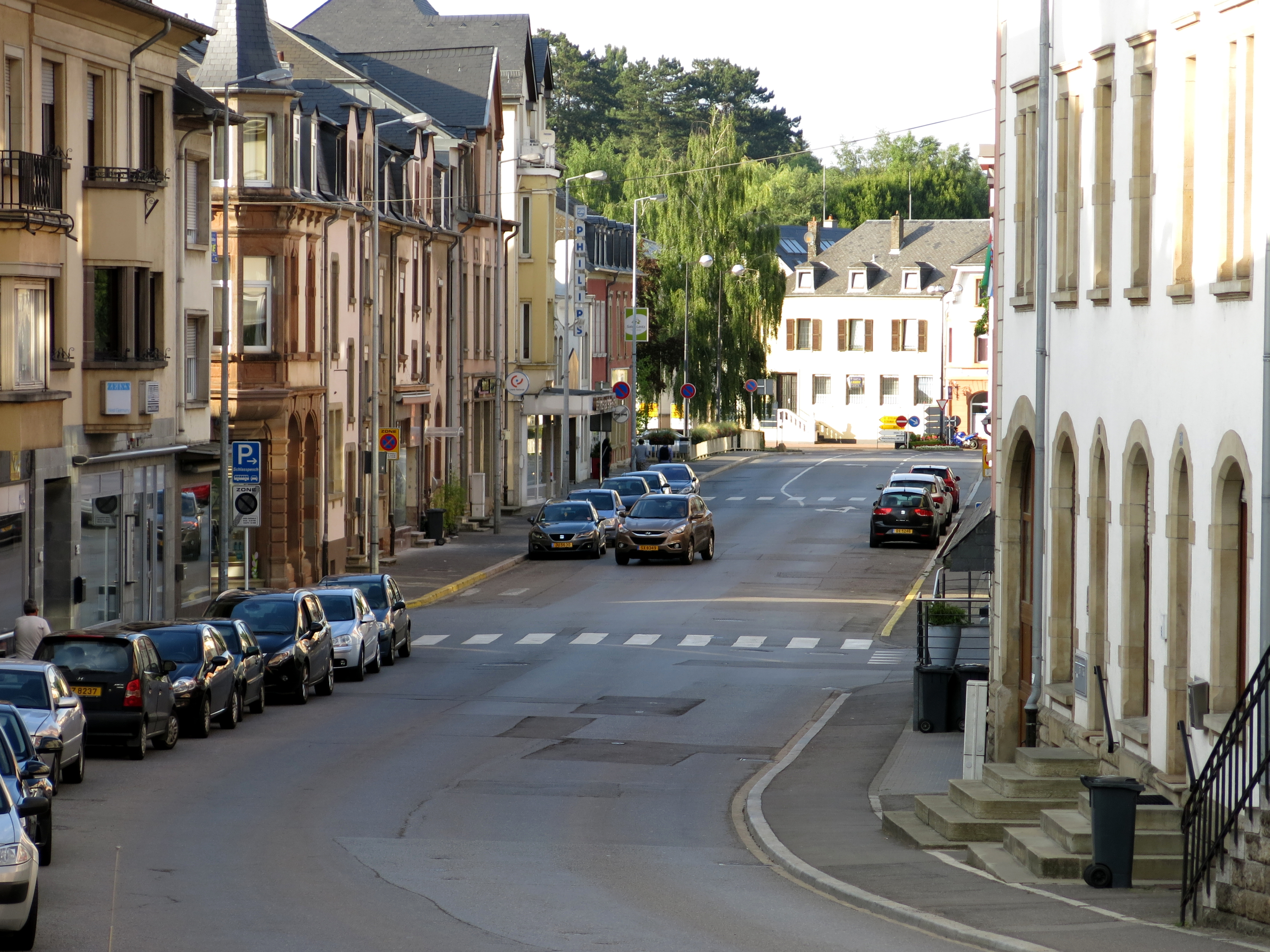

- Coat of arms

- Map of Luxembourg with Mersch highlighted in orange, and the canton in dark red
- Coordinates: 49.75°N 6.1°E
- Country: Luxembourg
- Canton: Mersch

Government
  - Mayor: Michel Malherbe

Area
  - Total: 49.74 km^{2} (19.20 sq mi)
  - Rank: 9th of 100
- Highest elevation: 428 m (1,404 ft)
  - Rank: 29th of 100
- Lowest elevation: 208 m (682 ft)
  - Rank: 28th of 100

Population (2026)
  - Total: 10,947
  - Rank: 13th of 100
  - Density: 220.1/km^{2} (570.0/sq mi)
  - Rank: 40th of 100
- Time zone: UTC+1 (CET)
  - Summer (DST): UTC+2 (CEST)
- LAU 2: LU0000409
- Website: mersch.lu

Mersch (French pronunciation: [mɛʁʃ], German pronunciation: [mɛʁʃ]; Luxembourgish: Miersch [ˈmiːɐ̯ʃ]) is a commune and town in central Luxembourg, situated in the canton of the same name. It is situated at the confluence of the rivers Alzette, Mamer and Eisch.

As of September 2026, the town of Mersch, which lies in the centre of the commune, has a population of 5,258. Other towns within the commune include Beringen, Berschbach, Moesdorf, Pettingen, Reckange, Rollingen, and Schoenfels.

Mersch is the home of the National Literature Centre, Luxembourg's national literary archive. The town is the site of one of the six regional headquarters of the Grand Ducal Police.

Mersch Castle is one of the castles belonging to the Valley of the Seven Castles. Located in the centre of the town, its history goes back to the 13th century. Today the castle houses the administrative offices of the local commune.

Some 3 kilometres (2 mi) north of Mersch, Pettingen Castle in the village of Pettingen is one of the best preserved fortified castles in the country.

== Transportation ==
Mersch is connected to the centre and north of the country by Line 10 trains serving Mersch railway station.

== Population ==
Historical population

Year	Pop.	±%
1821	2,223	—
1851	3,286	+47.8%
1900	2,989	−9.0%
1910	2,951	−1.3%
1922	3,060	+3.7%
1935	3,350	+9.5%

Year	Pop.	±%
1947	3,367	+0.5%
1960	3,480	+3.4%
1970	4,004	+15.1%
1981	4,817	+20.3%
1990	5,752	+19.4%
2000	6,841	+18.9%

Year	Pop.	±%
2005	7,277	+6.4%
2010	7,655	+5.2%
2015	8,841	+15.5%
2020	9,816	+11.0%
2021	10,018	+2.1%

Source data

== Notable people ==
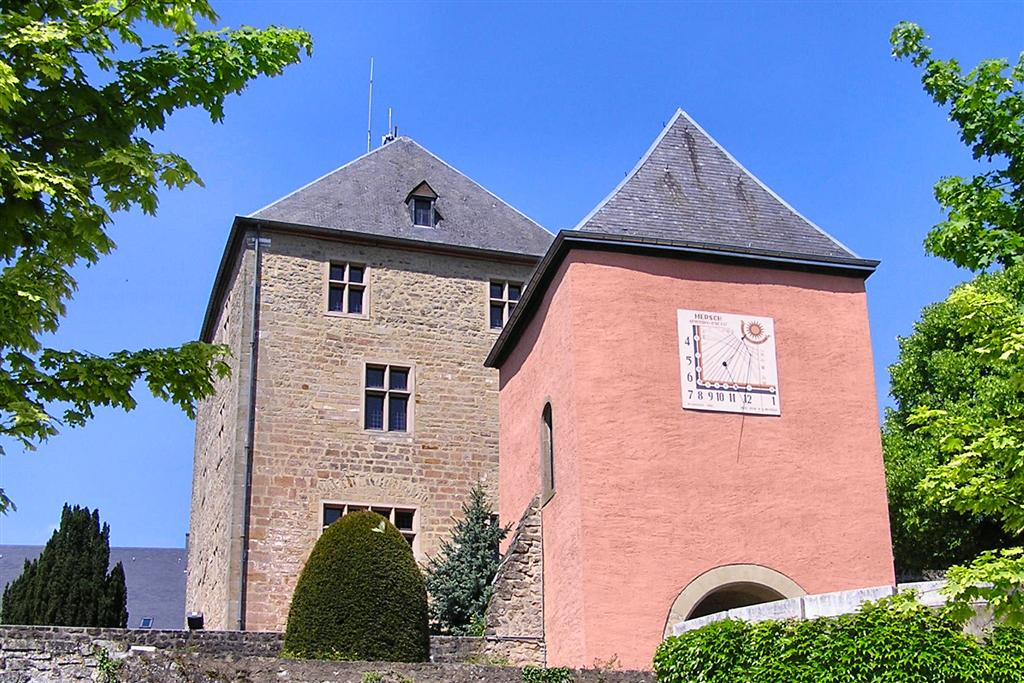
Mersch Castle

- Emmanuel Servais (1811–1890), a Luxembourgish politician; 5th Prime Minister of Luxembourg, 1867/1874.
- Nik Welter (1871–1951), a Luxembourgish writer, playwright, poet, professor, literary critic and statesman.
- Will Kesseler (1899-1983), a Luxembourgish painter, one of nation’s best Colourists.
- Nora Wagener (born 1989), a Luxembourgish short story writer, novelist, children's writer and playwright; brought up locally
