= Kristian Haugaard =

Danish cyclist

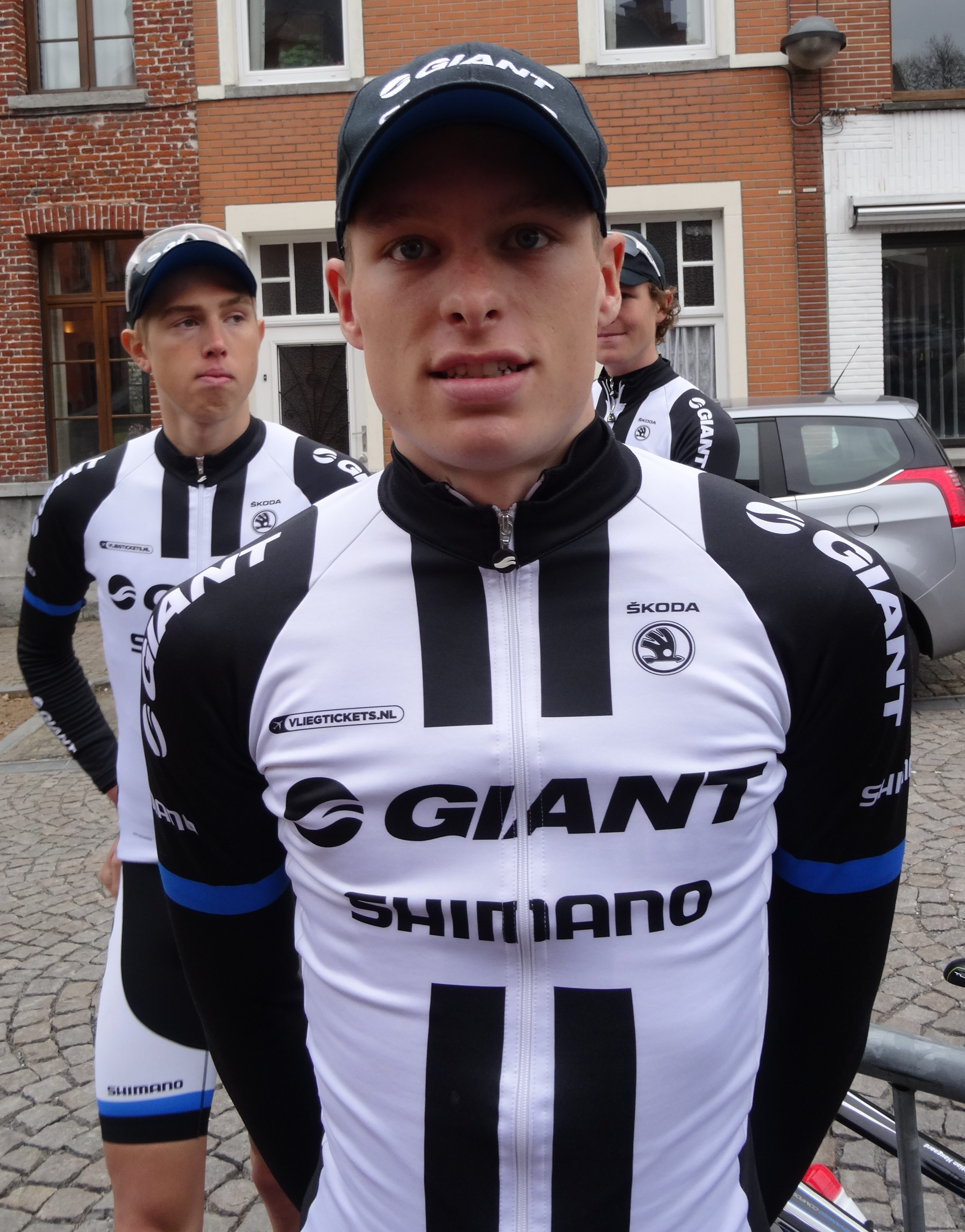
- Haugaard at the 2014 Triptyque des Monts et Châteaux

Personal information
- Full name: Kristian Haugaard Jensen
- Born: 27 February 1991 (age 35)

Cycling career
- Sport: Cycling
- Current team: Retired
- Discipline: Road
- Role: Rider

Professional teams
- 2010–2011: Energi Fyn
- 2012: Team TreFor
- 2013: Leopard–Trek Continental Team
- 2014: Development Team Giant–Shimano
- 2015: Leopard Development Team
- 2016: Team ColoQuick–Cult

Kristian Haugaard Jensen (born 27 February 1991) is a Danish former professional cyclist.

== Major results ==
2009
5th Overall Tour du Pays de Vaud

1st Stage 1

2010
6th Overall Coupe des nations Ville Saguenay
2012
2nd Fyen Rundt
2013
1st Stage 1 Flèche du Sud
1st Mountains classification Tour de l'Avenir
2nd Overall Czech Cycling Tour

1st Stage 1 (TTT)

3rd Road race, National Under-23 Road Championships
4th La Côte Picarde
5th Ronde van Vlaanderen U23
7th Overall Istrian Spring Trophy
7th Overall Troféu Joaquim Agostinho

1st Young rider classification

9th Overall Course de la Paix U23
2014
3rd Overall Circuit des Ardennes
5th Dorpenomloop Rucphen
6th Overall Oberösterreichrundfahrt
7th Overall Triptyque des Monts et Châteaux
9th Overall Ronde de l'Oise
