= Colpach-Haut =

Village in Luxembourg

Coordinates: 49°46′N 5°49′E

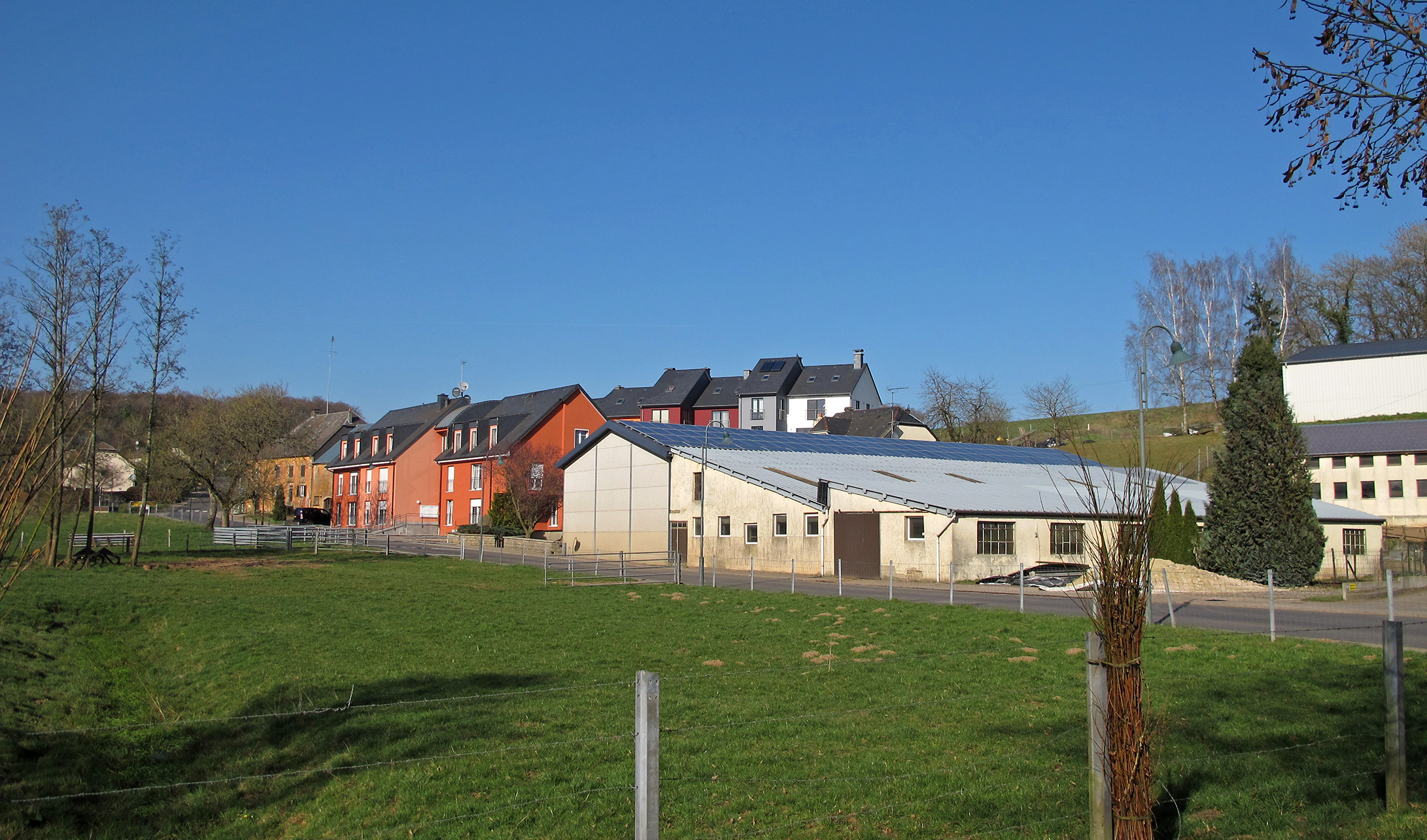
Buildings in Colpach-Haut, Luxembourg, along the main road

Colpach-Haut (Luxembourgish: Uewerkolpech, German: Obercolpach) is a village in the commune of Ell, in western Luxembourg. As of September 2026, the village has a population of 322.
