= Christian Mager =

German bicycle racer

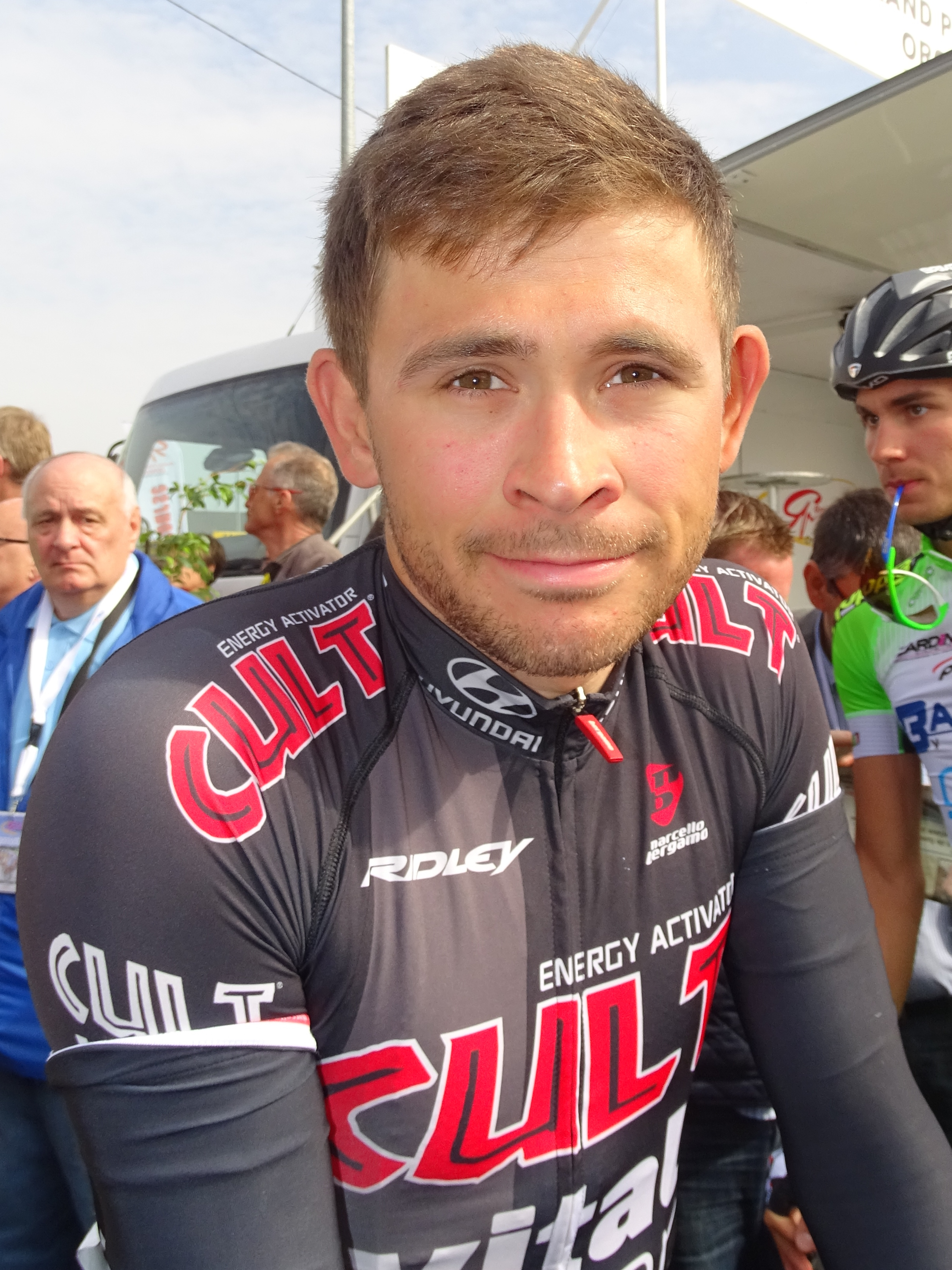
- Mager at the 2015 Grand Prix de Denain

Personal information
- Full name: Christian Mager
- Born: 8 April 1992 (age 34) Darmstadt, Germany
- Height: 1.72 m (5 ft 8 in)
- Weight: 60 kg (132 lb)

Cycling career
- Sport: Cycling
- Current team: CT Rhein-Main Rödermark; Team Bornträger–Assos
- Discipline: Road
- Role: Rider

Amateur teams
- 2006–2010: SSG Bensheim
- 2009–2010: Fachklinik Dr. Herzog–SV Sparkassen Versicherung
- 2018: Herrmann Radteam
- 2019: Go Bike Service Racing Team
- 2019–: CT Rhein-Main Rödermark
- 2020–: Team Bornträger–Assos

Professional teams
- 2011–2012: Team Heizomat Mapei
- 2013–2014: Team Stölting
- 2015: Cult Energy Pro Cycling
- 2016: Stölting Service Group
- 2017: Team Sauerland NRW p/b Henley & Partners
- 2017: Hrinkow Advarics Cycleang

Christian Mager (born 8 April 1992) is a German cyclist, who currently rides for German amateur teams CT Rhein-Main Rödermark and Team Bornträger–Assos.

== Major results ==
2014
4th Overall Tour de Berlin
2016
8th Overall Tour des Fjords
2017
2nd Overall Tour of Szeklerland

1st Points classification
1st Stage 1

8th Overall Oberösterreichrundfahrt
9th Overall Tour du Maroc

1st Stage 4
