= Roodt, Ell =

Town in Ell, Luxembourg

Roodt
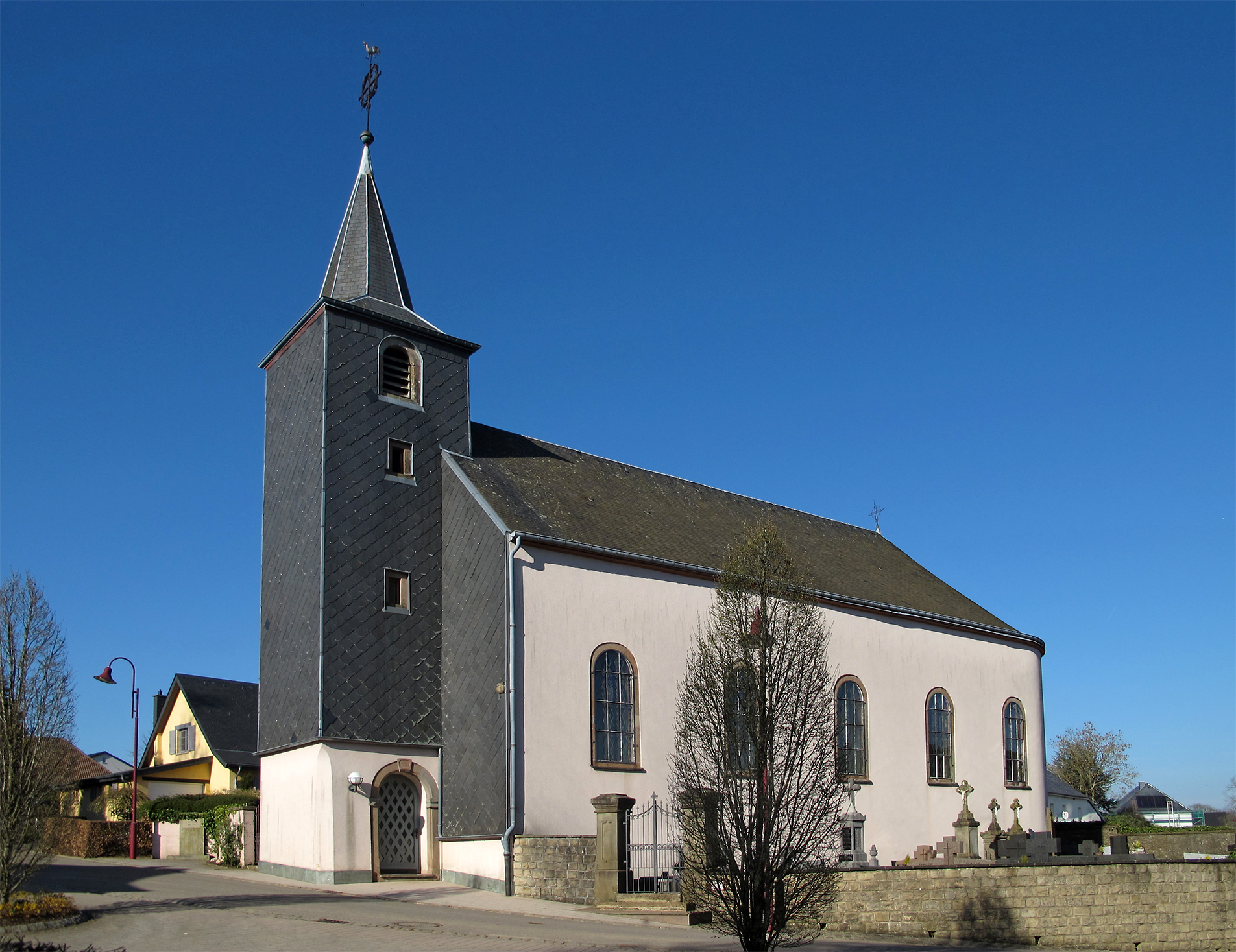
- Kirche Roodt

- Location within Luxembourg
- Coordinates: 49°47′42″N 05°49′18″E
- Country: Luxembourg
- Canton: Redange
- Commune: Ell
- Elevation: 412 m (1,352 ft)

Population (2022)
  - Total: 403

Roodt (Luxembourgish: Rued) is a small town located in the commune of Ell, in western Luxembourg, at an elevation of 412 meters above sea level. As of September 2026, the town has a population of 418.
