= Trouble at Timpetill =

2008 film by Nicolas Bary

Les Enfants de Timpelbach
- Film poster
- Directed by: Nicolas Bary
- Written by: Nicolas Bary; Nicolas Peufaillit
- Produced by: Dimitri Rassam
- Cinematography: Axel Cosnefroy
- Edited by: Véronique Lange
- Music by: Frédéric Talgorn
- Production companies: Onyx Films; Chapter 2; LuxAnimation
- Distributed by: Pathé Distribution
- Release date: 17 December 2008 (France)
- Running time: 133 minutes
- Country: France
- Language: French
- Budget: $14.5 million
- Box office: $10.7 million

Trouble at Timpetill (French: Les Enfants de Timpelbach) is a 2008 French fantasy adventure film written and directed by Nicolas Bary, based on the novel of the same name by Henry Winterfeld, first published in 1937.

It was filmed in Luxembourg and in the German-speaking community of Belgium.

The film won the TFO Prize for Best Youth Film at the 2011 edition of the Cinéfranco. Bary has revealed plans to remake the film with his production company, Timpel Pictures.

== Plot ==
The plot closely follows the storyline of the novel.

The action takes place in the village of Timpetill, located in an unnamed mountain country in Europe, most likely Switzerland or Luxembourg. Some signs are written in German, others in French, but the road markers are shown in fantastical, unreadable script.

The main character is Manfred (Raphaël Katz), a schoolboy of about nine years old. Life in the village, with its curious blend of patriarchal traditions and late-19th-century dress alongside modern inventions such as cars, trains, and even a mechanical flying cuckoo, seems idyllic at first. Yet the town is plagued by a gang of children called "The Knackers", who take pleasure in cruel pranks at the expense of both other children and adults. Unable to identify the true culprits, the adults begin to suspect all the children to some degree. In desperation, they decide to teach them a lesson by pretending to abandon the town. Planning only to spend a day in the forest before returning, the adults inadvertently stray into a neighboring country, where they are arrested and thrown into prison.

Meanwhile, the children, realizing that the adults have disappeared, initially rejoice at their newfound freedom. Most join the gang's revelry in the local tavern, while a smaller group, led by Marianne (Adèle Exarchopoulos), understands that they must take responsibility for running the village and securing food. One by one, hungry children begin leaving the gang to join Marianne's group. "The Knackers", however, are quick to retaliate.

== Cast ==
- Raphaël Katz : Manfred
- Adèle Exarchopoulos : Marianne
- Léo Legrand : Thomas
- Gérard Depardieu : Général Igor
- Carole Bouquet : Drohne
- Armelle : Corbac
- Eric Godon : Butcher Stettner
- Baptiste Betoulaud : Oscar Stettner
- Lola Créton : Mireille Stettner
- Léo Paget : Robert Lapointe
- Terry Edinval : Wolfgang
- Florian Goutieras : P'tit Louis
- Mathieu Donne : Gros Paul
- Martin Jobert : Willy Hak
- Ilona Bachelier : Charlotte
- Julien Dubois : Barnabé
- Marcus Vigneron : Charles Benz
- Jonathan Joss : Jean Krög
- David Cognaux : Kevin
- Sacha Lecomte : Philibert
- Tilly Mandelbrot : Erna
- Maxime Riquier : Bobby le Scribe
- Manon Chevallier : Marion
- Valentine Bouly : Paulette
- Talina Boyaci : Zoé
- Vanille Ougen : Kimy
- Éric Naggar : Krögel
- Mayane Maggiori : Hak
- Odile Matthieu : Mistress Krog
- Isabelle de Hertogh : Edith Benz
- François Damiens : The delivery guy
- Philippe Le Mercier : The mayor
- Stéphane Bissot : Manfred's mother
- Thierry Desroses : l'abbé

== Production ==
After three short films, Trouble at Timpetill became the first feature film of Nicolas Bary, who was 26 years old in 2008. The producer, Dimitri Rassam, of the same age, is the son of Carole Bouquet, who also appeared in the film. Following in the footsteps of his father, the film producer Jean-Pierre Rassam, who died in 1985, Dimitri Rassam realized his own first feature film.

In concept, the story resembles William Golding’s novel Lord of the Flies, which also tells of a group of children suddenly left without adults. Unlike Golding’s novel, however, in Timpetill it is the "reasonable", democratic group of children that prevails.

The film received funding of 600,000 euros from EURIMAGES.

Filming locations included:

- Beaufort Castle in Beaufort, Luxembourg;
- Ansembourg Castle in Ansembourg, Luxembourg;
- Eyneburg in Belgium.

The film was released in France and Belgium on 17 December 2008.
