= Ansembourg =

Coordinates: 49°42′09″N 6°02′36″E

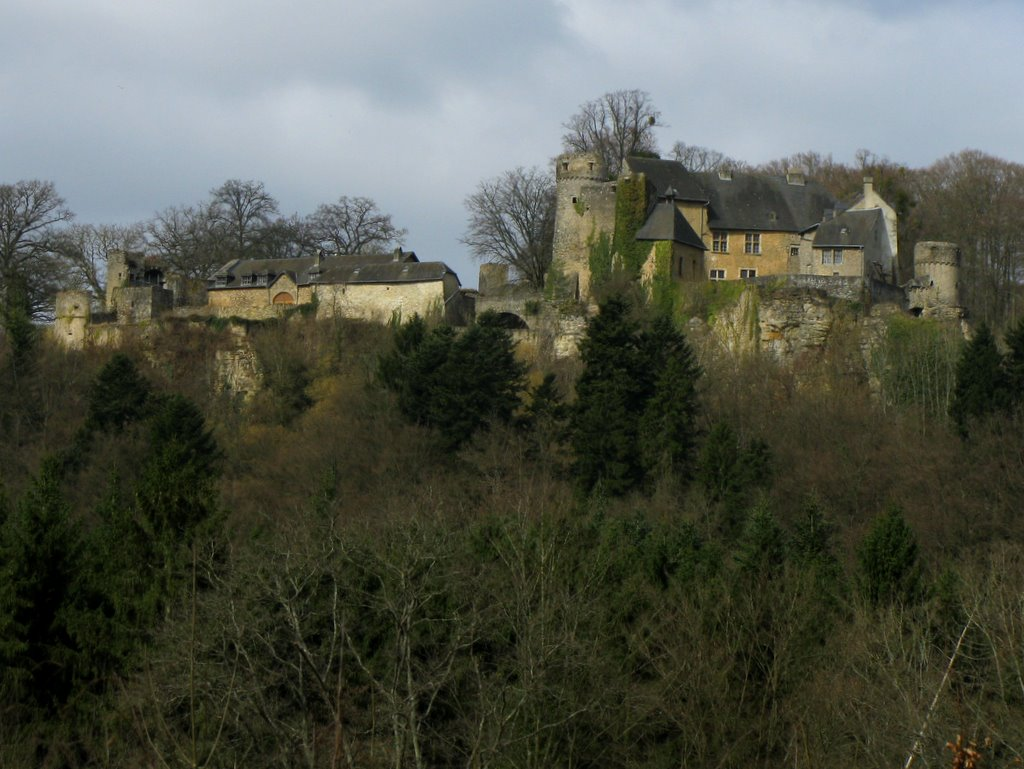
Old castle

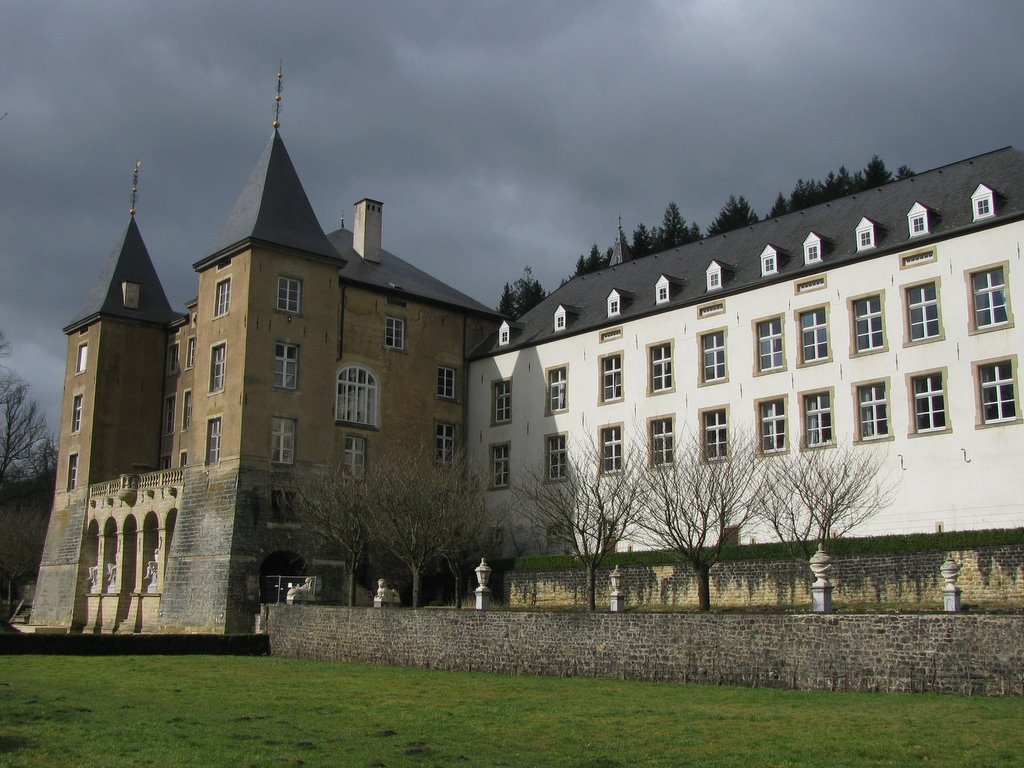
New castle

Ansembourg (Luxembourgish: Aansebuerg, German: Ansemburg) is a village in the commune of Helperknapp, in western Luxembourg. As of September 2026, the village had a population of 51.

Ansembourg is in a part of the Eisch valley known as the Valley of the Seven Castles. The village is the site of two of the seven castles. The New Castle of Ansembourg, located about one kilometre or just over half a mile below the Old Castle, was built by the industrialist Thomas Bidart in 1639 and is now known for its more modern finish and its terraced gardens.
