= Ansembourg Castle =

Castle in Luxembourg

Coordinates: 49°42′06″N 06°01′56″E

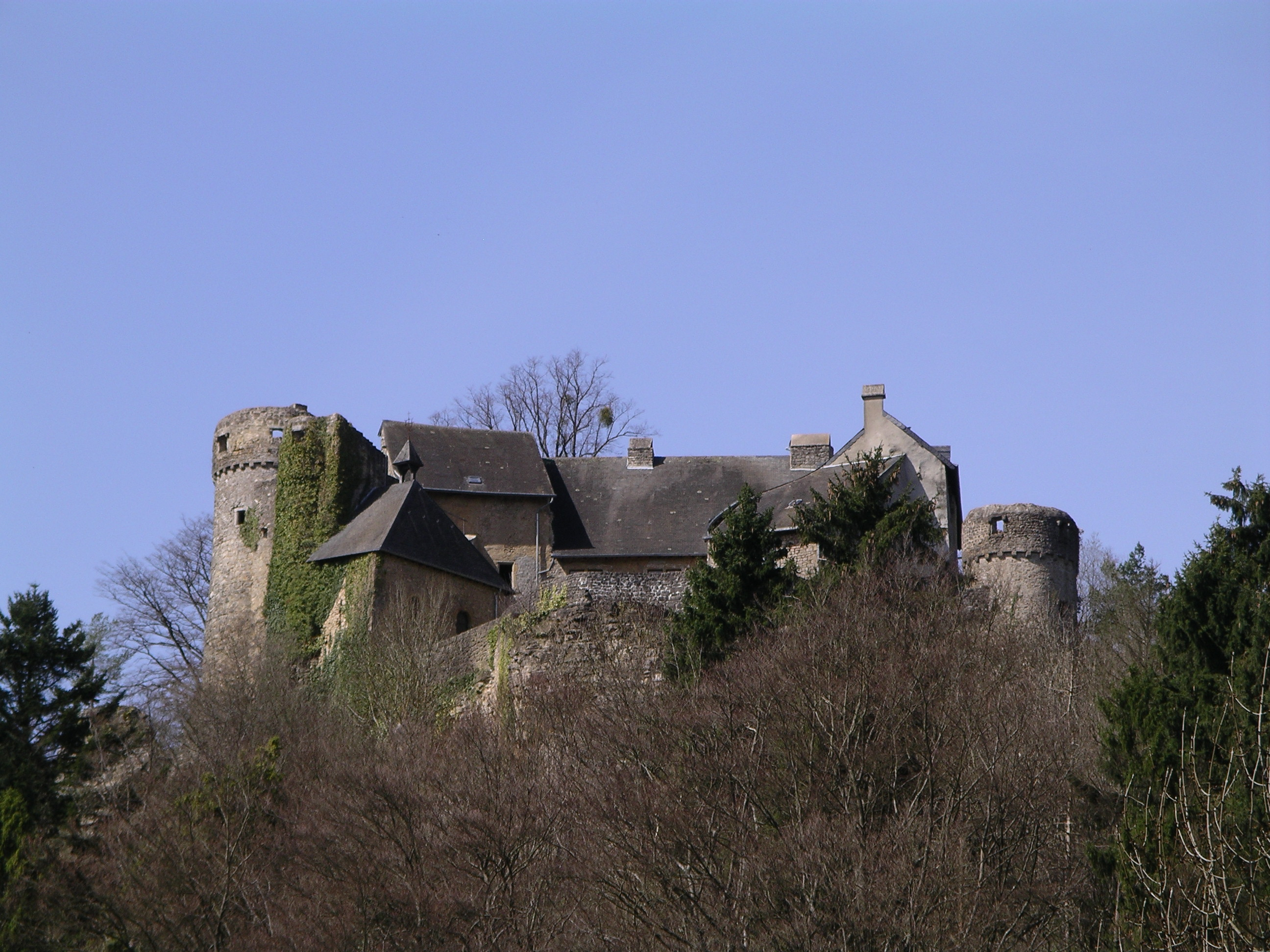
Ansembourg Castle

Ansembourg Old Castle (Luxembourgish: Buerg Aansebuerg, French: Vieux Château d'Ansembourg, German: Burg Ansemburg), known as the Old Castle of Ansembourg, in central Luxembourg is one of the castles belonging to the Valley of the Seven Castles. Located high above the little village of Ansembourg, the medieval castle is the private residence of the current Count and Countess of Ansembourg.

== History ==
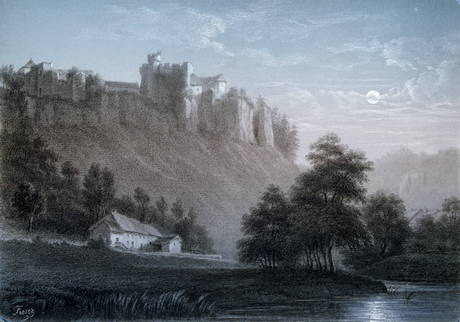
Old painting of Ansembourg Castle by Jean-Baptiste Fresez (c. 1857)

The property is first mentioned in 1135 when the lord of the castle was Hubert d'Ansembourg. The fortifications were probably built in the middle of the 12th century. At the beginning of the 14th century, the south-western tower gate and the northern keep appear to have been built by Jofroit d'Ansembourg. Since the times of Jakob II de Raville-Ansembourg, the castle does not appear to have been significantly altered. The main entrance bears the date of 1565. In 1683, the castle was damaged by the French troops of Marshal de Boufflers. In the 17th century, repairs were carried out by the Bidart and the Marchant et d'Ansembourg families who built the New Castle of Ansembourg.

== Recent developments ==
Today the castle is owned by Gaston-Gaëtan Count de Marchant et d'Ansembourg who moved into the property after the death of his father. At the end of 2008, the Luxembourg government acquired the family's library (around 6000 books) and were offered the family archives. Interest had grown in the collection after the Codex Mariendalensis manuscript telling the story of Yolanda of Vianden was found in 1999 by the linguist Guy Berg. The manuscript dating from the end of the 14th or beginning of the 15th century was especially significant as it was written in the Moselle Franconian dialect which is closely related to modern Luxembourgish.

== The castle today ==
The castle is private property and is not open to visitors. The gardens may be visited on some days.

In 2011, the Count of Ansembourg opened a boutique hotel, in one of the buildings surrounding the castle. Nowadays it operates as a bed & breakfast with seven rooms.

== See also ==
- New Castle of Ansembourg
- List of castles in Luxembourg
