= Koerich Castle =

Ruined castle in Koerich, Luxembourg

Coordinates: 49°40′10″N 05°56′56″E

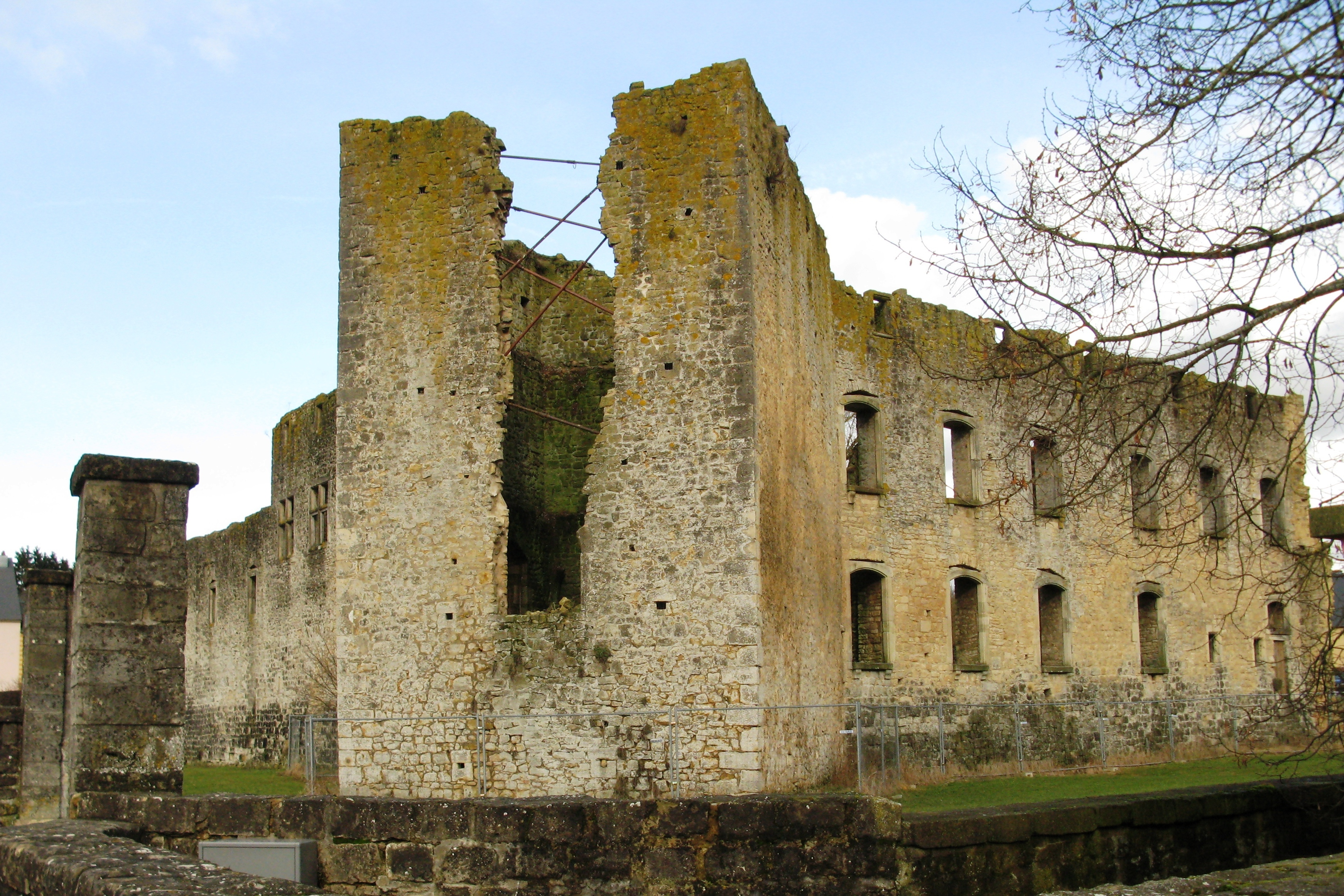
Koerich Castle

Koerich Castle (Luxembourgish: Schlass Käerch; French: Château de Koerich; German: Schloss Koerich) is a ruin located in the village of Koerich in central Luxembourg. With a history dating back to the 12th century, it is one of the castles in the Valley of the Seven Castles.

== Location ==
Standing on level ground in the valley of the stream of Goeblange, the castle's impressive keep and external walls blend harmoniously with the Baroque church and the old houses in the centre of the village.

== History ==
The Grevenschlass, now known as Koerich Castle, was built by Wirich I, Lord of Koerich and Seneschal of Luxembourg at the end of the 12th and beginning of the 13th century in late Romanesque style. It was expanded in 1304 by Godefroid of Koerich who gave it a more Gothic appearance. The keep, now 11 m tall, was certainly much higher when it was built. With a base measuring 12 by 11.6 m and walls up to 3.5 m thick, it is one of the most impressive in the entire region. A spiral staircase inside one of the walls provided access to the different floors.

Surrounded by a moat, the castle originally had a fortified entrance with a portcullis. From 1380, Gilles of Autel and Koerich converted the stronghold into a more comfortable residence by building two 12-m towers at either end of the south wall. The south-western tower which still stands, houses a chapel on the ground floor. In 1580, the new owner Jacques de Raville made further changes, demolishing part of the property and adding two Renaissance wings. The stately fireplace on the first floor and large rectangular windows testify to the castle's palatial splendor at the time. The south wing was again altered in 1728, this time with Baroque additions.

After the death of the Ravilles in the second half of the 18th century, the castle started to fall into ruin owing to lack of maintenance. In 1950, Pierre Flammang, the last private owner, carried out some essential structural repairs before the castle finally came into the hands of the State.

== The castle today ==
Although major repairs are still in progress, the site can be visited free of charge.

== Gallery ==
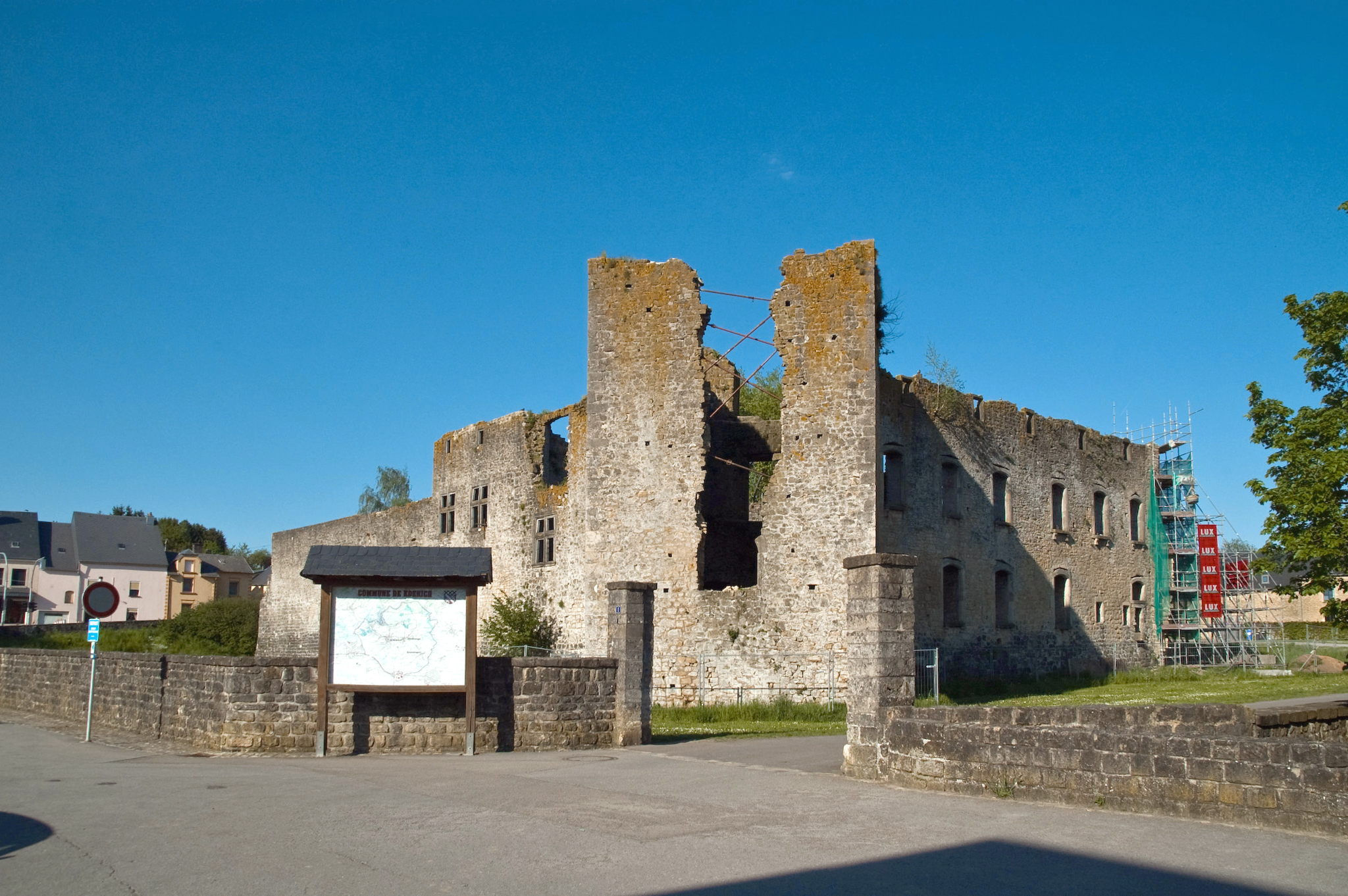
Castle entrance

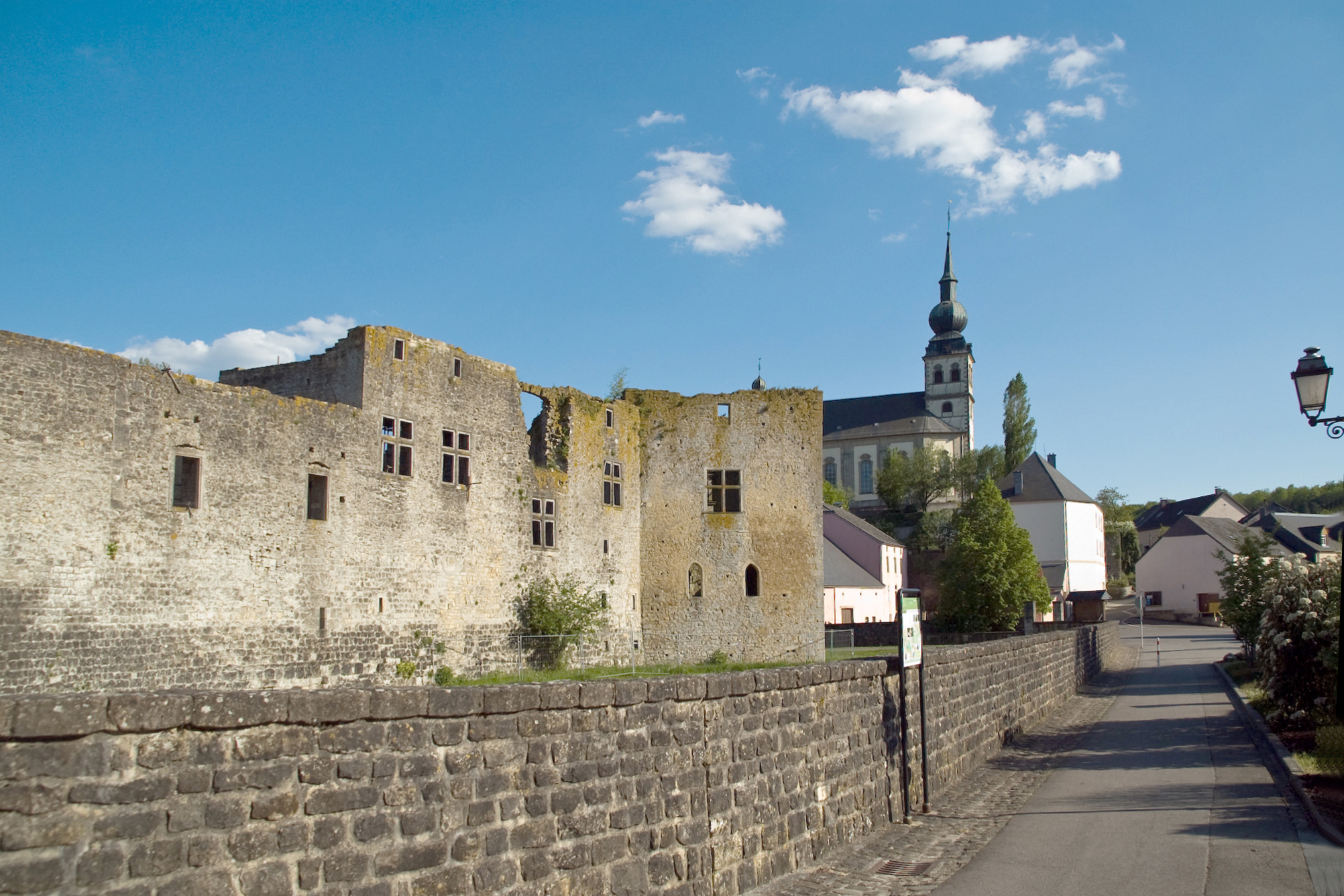
The castle and Baroque church

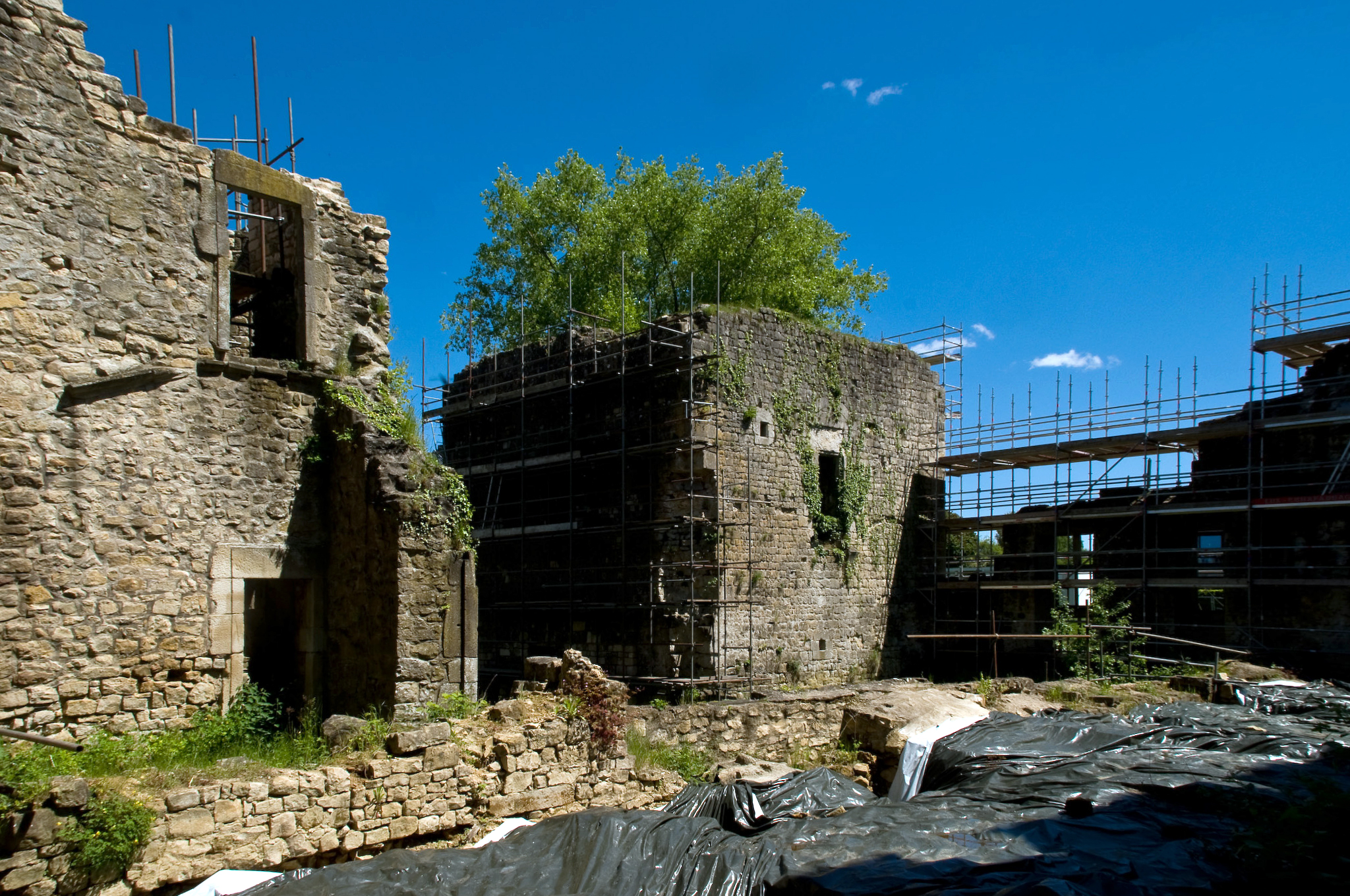
The interior

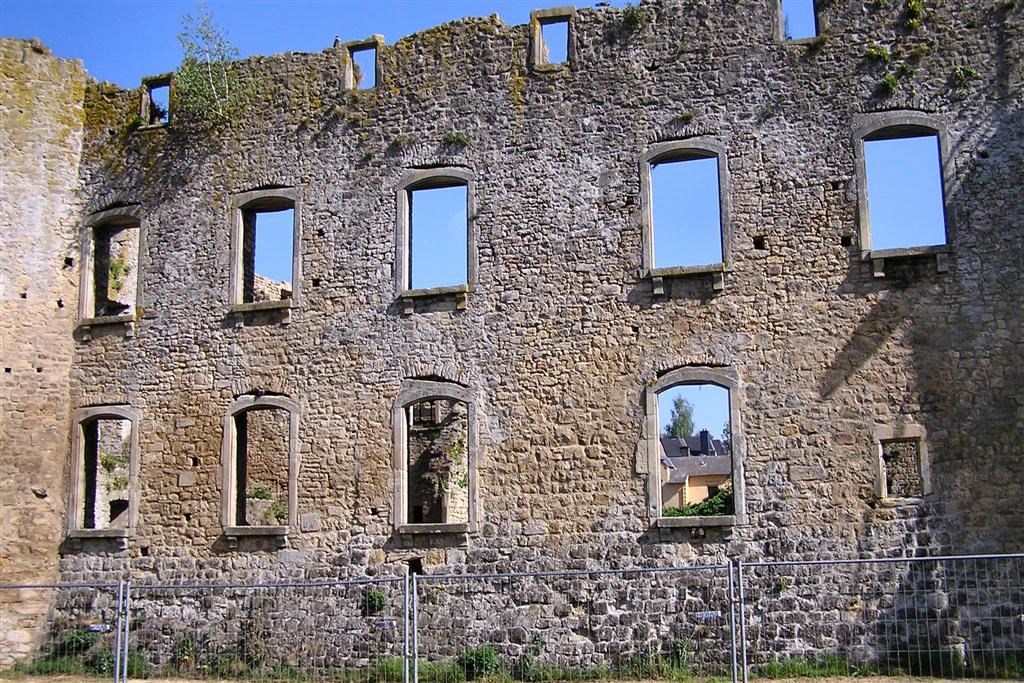
The southern wall

== See also ==
- List of castles in Luxembourg
