= Codex Mariendalensis =

Coordinates: 49.6097°N 6.1308°E

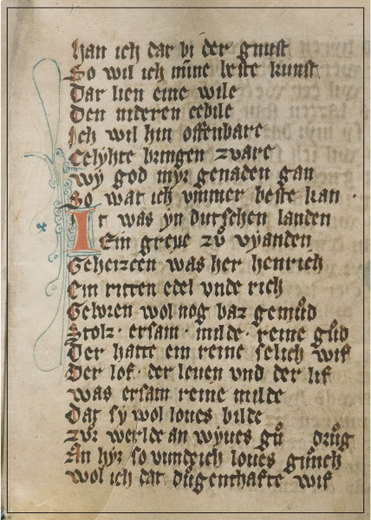
- Codex Mariendalensis (c. 1310)
- Author: Brother Hermann von Veldenz
- Publication date: c. 1310
- Media type: Ink and color on parchment
- National Library of Luxembourg

The Codex Mariendalenis is a manuscript on vellum containing the epic poem Yolanda vu Veianen or Yolanda of Vianden. It is believed to be the work of Brother Hermann von Veldenz who probably wrote the story of Yolanda's life in 1290 after her death in 1283. The work consists of 5,963 lines of rhyming couplets in Moselle Franconian which bears close similarities to today's Luxembourgish. It is therefore of particular interest to those tracing the history of the Luxembourgish language.

== History ==
Brother Hermann's epic appears to have lain in the Marienthal monastery for almost four centuries after he wrote it. In 1655, the original was copied on paper by the Belgian Jesuit, Alexander von Wiltheim. At the same time, Wiltheim wrote a life of Yolanda in Latin based on Brother Hermann's Middle High German. Then in November 1999, the Luxembourg linguist Guy Berg and Yasmin Krull discovered the original Codex in Ansembourg Castle, a short distance from the monastery at Marienthal.

The poem tells how Princess Yolanda gave up the comforts of her home in Vianden Castle to join the Convent of Marienthal where she later became the prioress. See further details under Yolanda of Vianden.

== Acquisition by the Luxembourg National Archives ==
The Codex Mariendalensis, together with other documents belonging to the lords of Ansembourg, was acquired by the Luxembourgish state in 2008 and now forms part of the collections of the Luxembourg National Archives and the National Library of Luxembourg. It was digitised by the latter institution in 2025, rendering it freely accessible online.

== Sources ==
- Berg, Guy: "Der Codex Mariendalensis: Zu Wiederauffindung, Erschließung und Edition einer hochmittelalterlichen Handschrift aus dem Raume Luxemburg." In: Section de linguistique, d'ethnologie et d'onomastique de l'Institut Grand-ducal (ed.): Bulletin linguistique et ethnologique, fasc. 30 (2001), pp. 7–26.
- Moulin, Claudine: "Bruder Hermanns 'Yolanda von Vianden'. Zur Erschließung und textgetreuen Edition des neuaufgefundenen Codex Mariendalensis", in: ebda, pp. 39–45.
