= Valley of the Seven Castles =

Informal name given to the Eisch valley in Luxembourg

Coordinates: 49.7°N 6.1°E

The Valley of the Seven Castles (Luxembourgish: Dall vun de siwe Schlässer; French: Vallée des sept châteaux) is an informal name given to the Äischdall, the valley of the Eisch river, in central Luxembourg. The valley stretches from the confluence with the Alzette upstream to Steinfort, on the border with Belgium. The entire route can be traversed in about an hour by car, starting near the town of Arlon on the Belgian/Luxembourg border. There is also a 37-kilometre footpath that takes hikers along the valley and past the castles.

It is named after the group of seven castles that line its route. Those seven castles are (in order, heading upstream):

- Mersch
- Schoenfels
- Hollenfels
- Ansembourg Castle
- New Castle of Ansembourg
- Septfontaines
- Koerich Castle
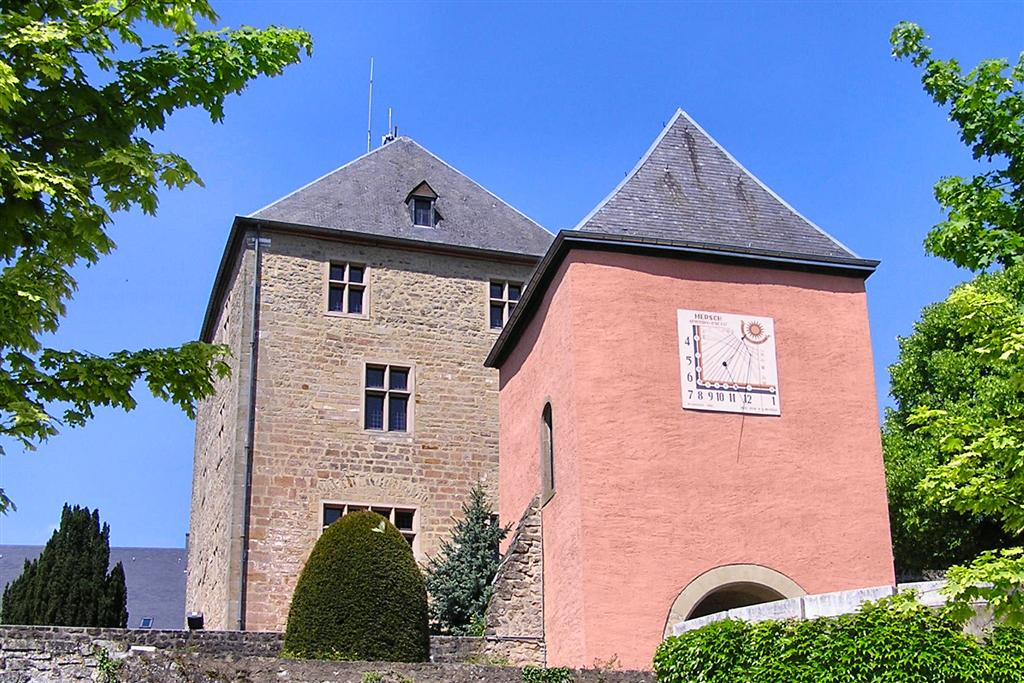
Mersch Castle

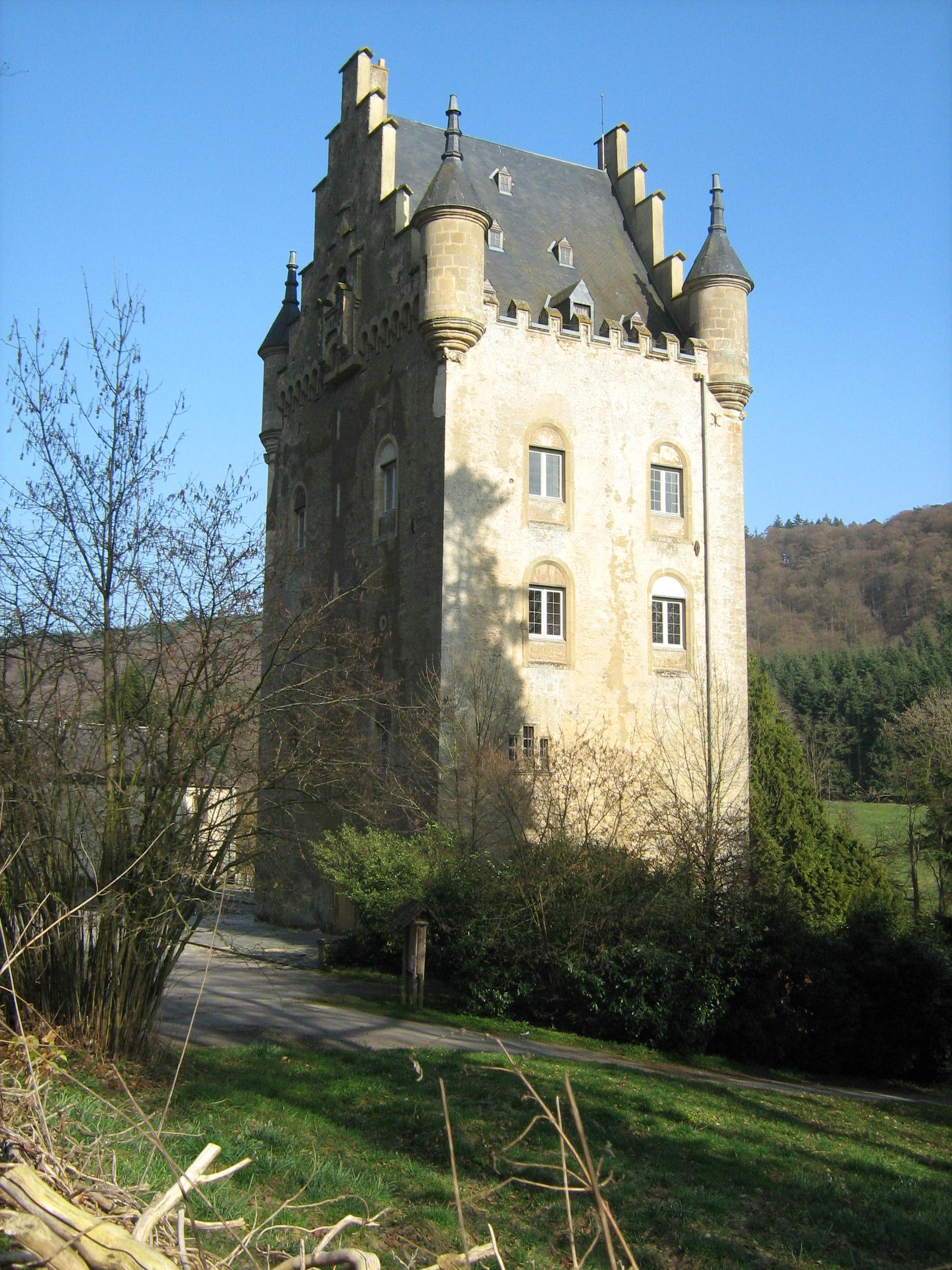
Schoenfels Castle

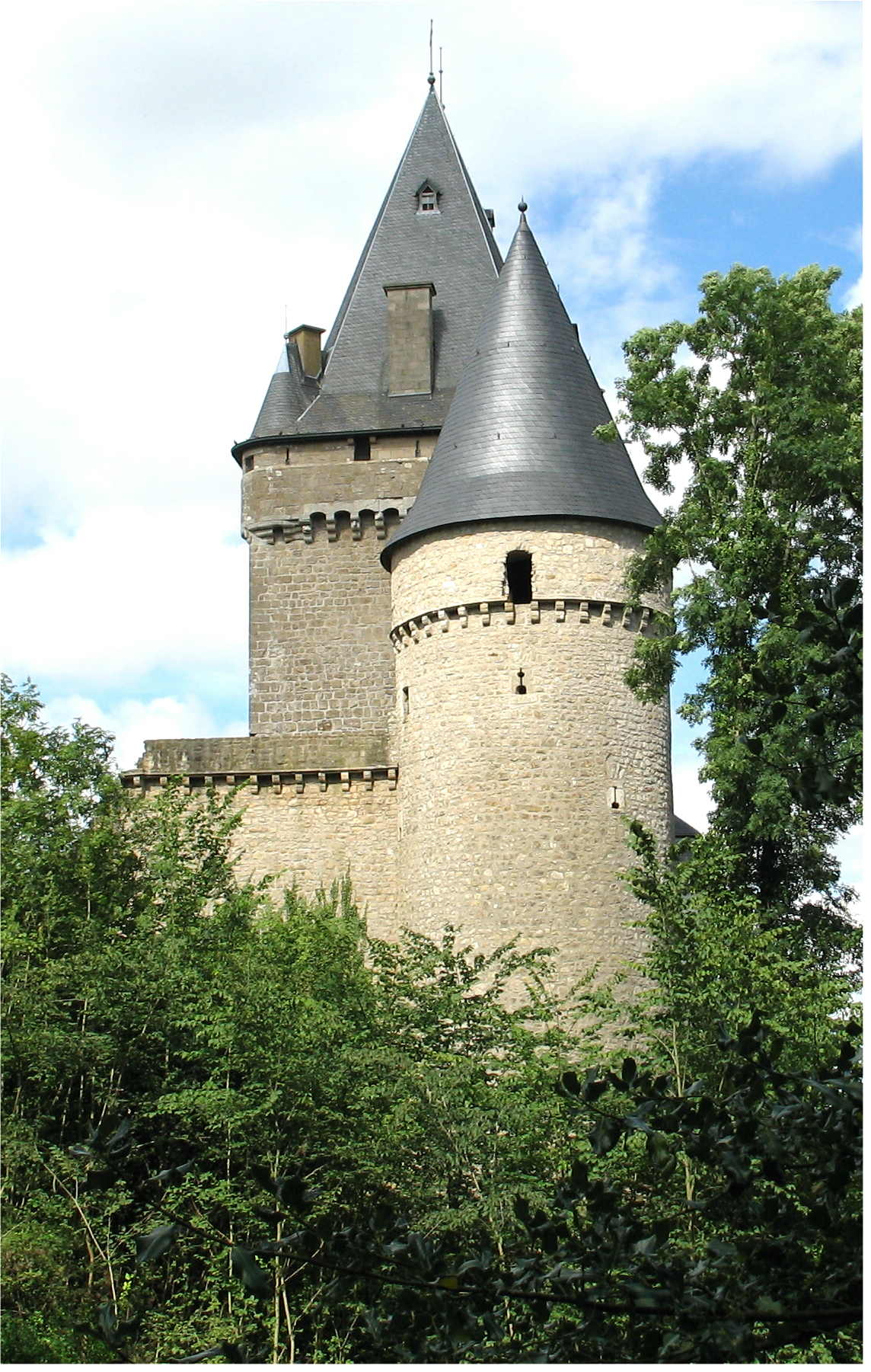
Hollenfels Castle

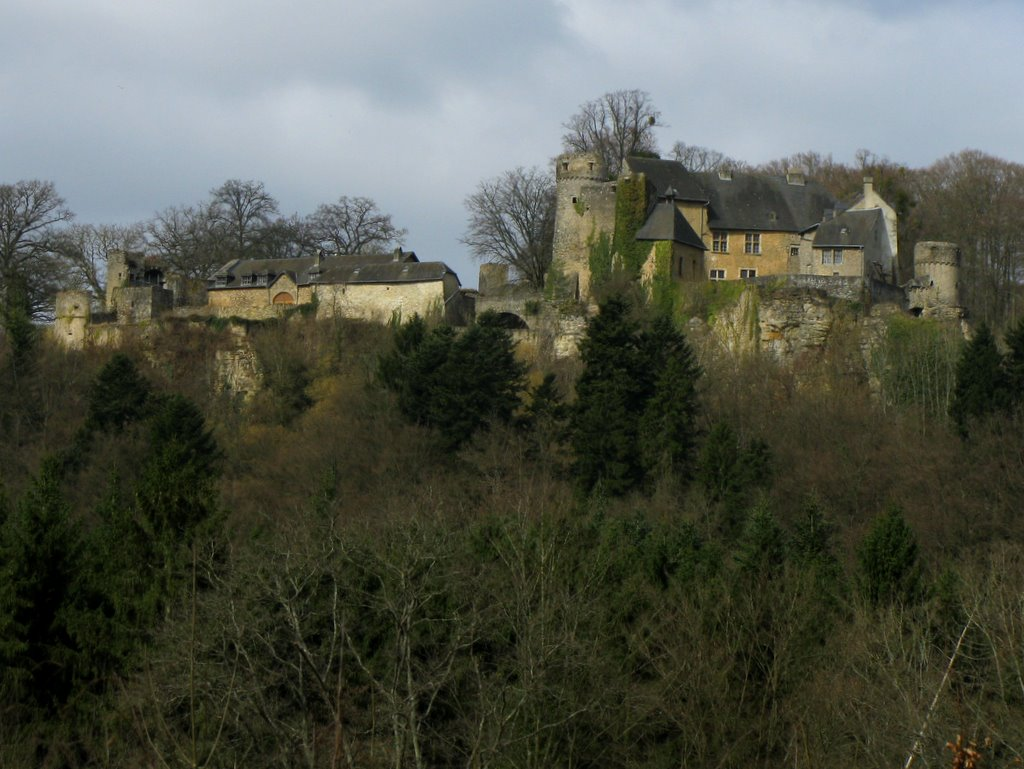
Old castle, Ansembourg

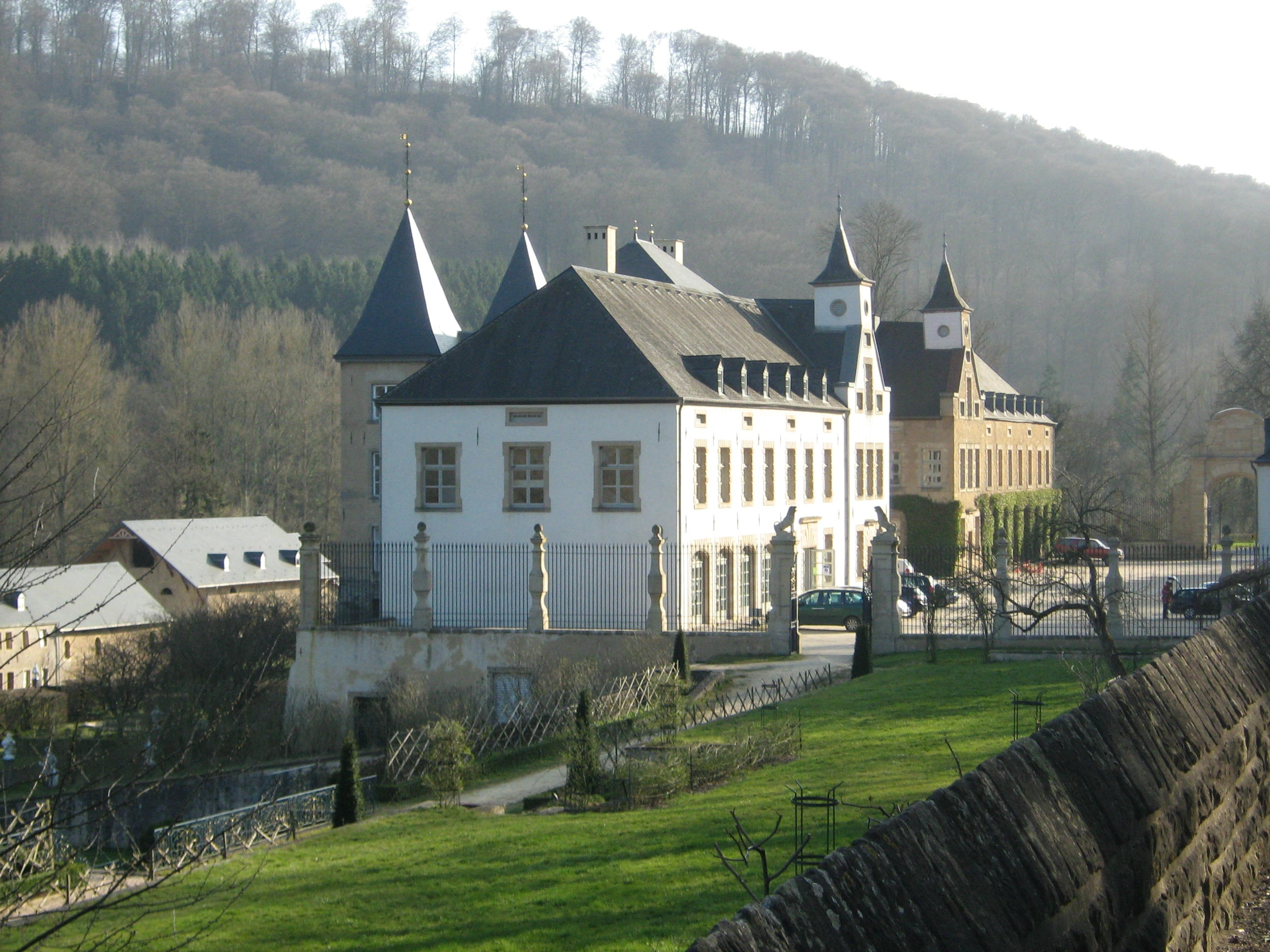
New castle, Ansembourg

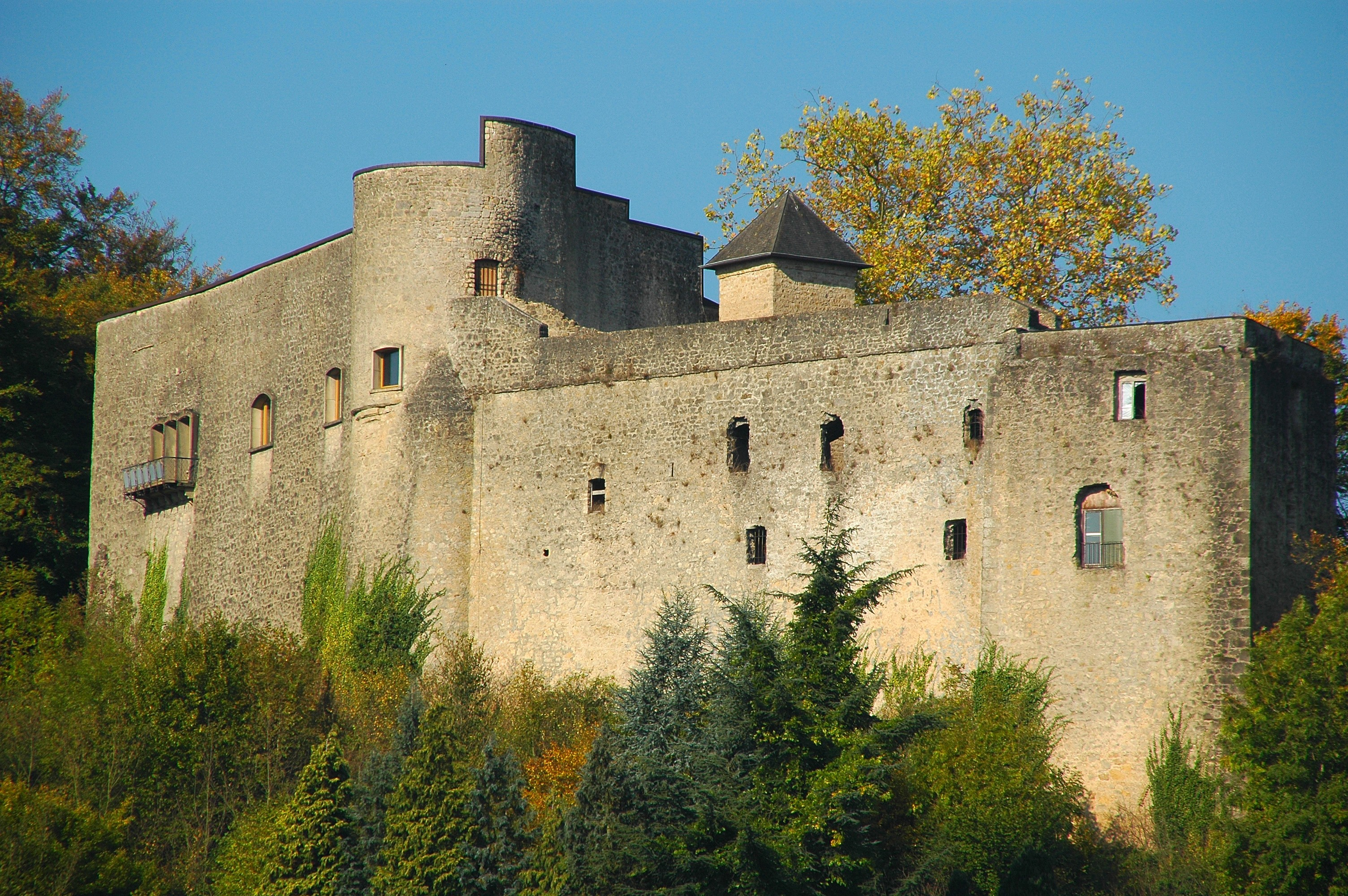
Septfontaines Castle

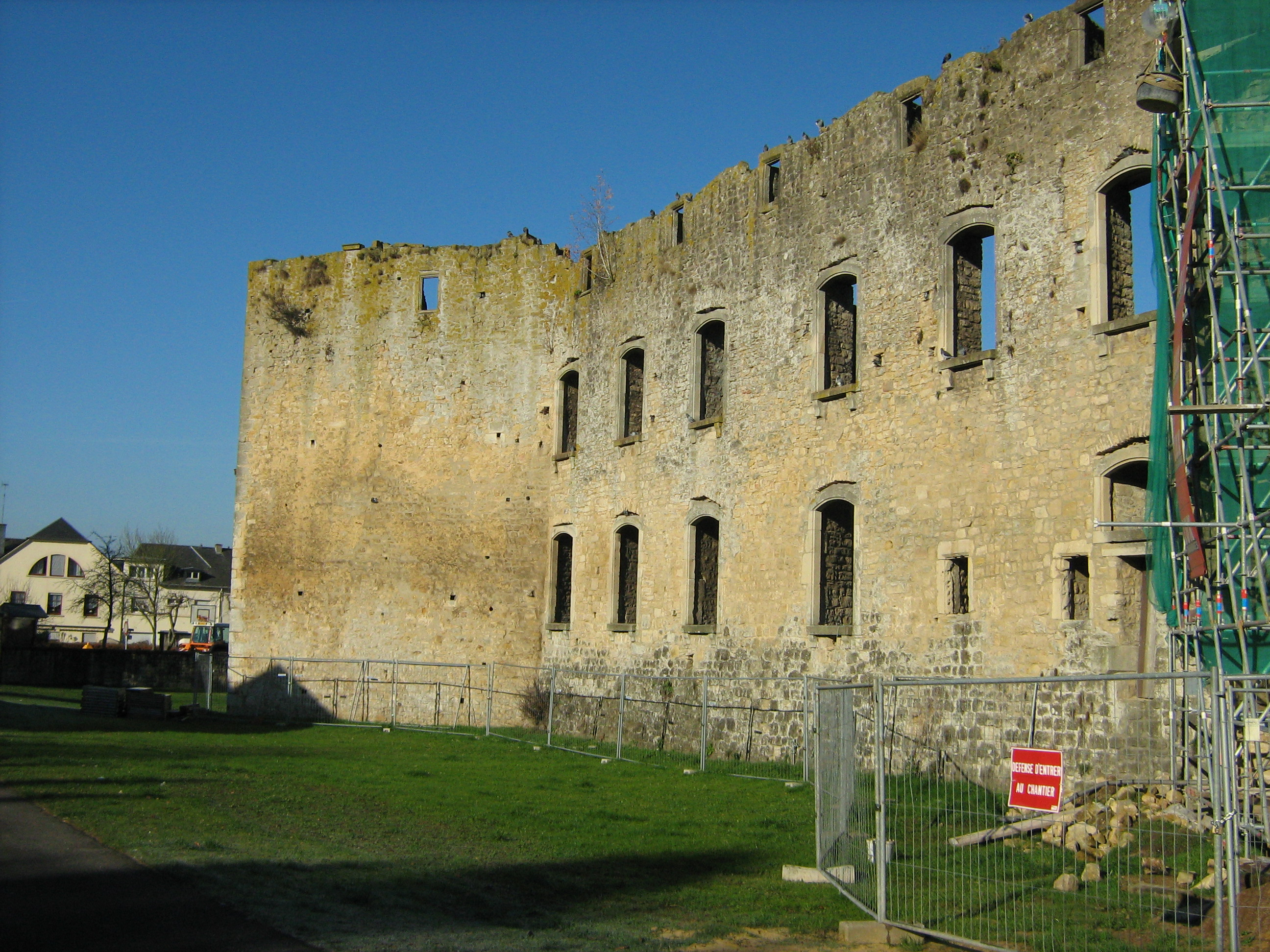
Koerich Castle

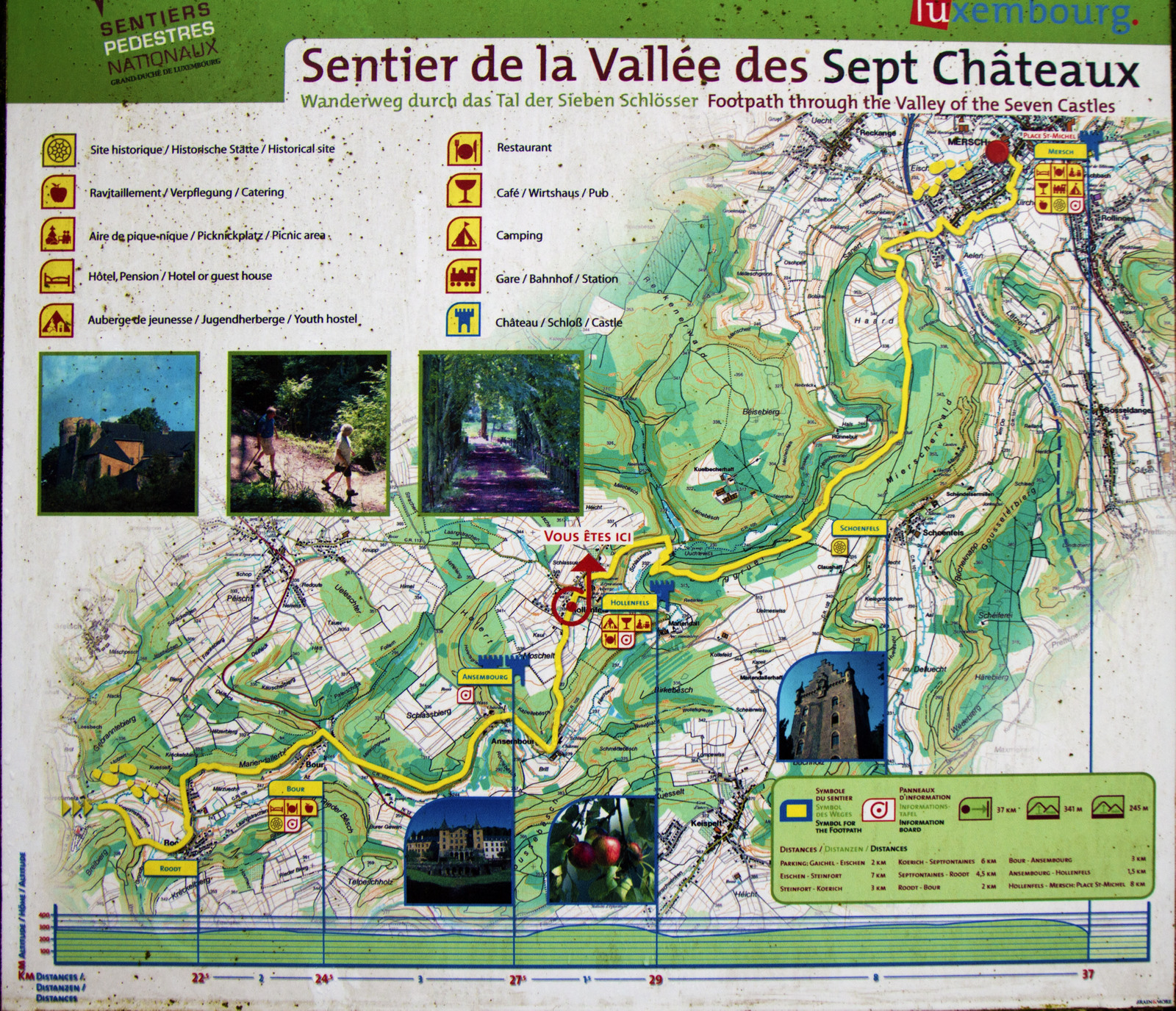
Valley of the Seven Castles Map
