= New Castle of Ansembourg =

Luxembourgish castle

Coordinates: 49°42′01″N 6°02′45″E

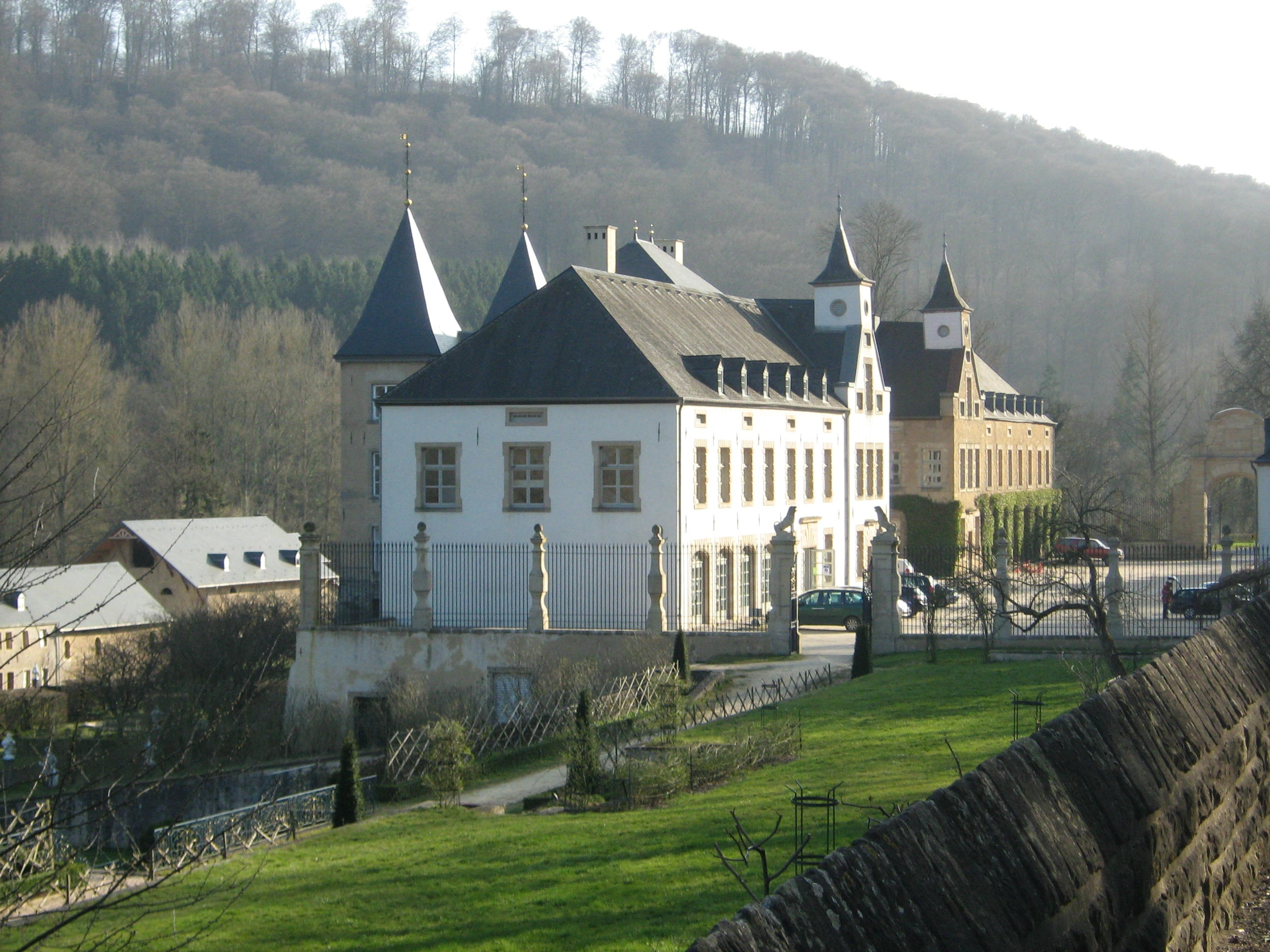
The New Castle of Ansembourg

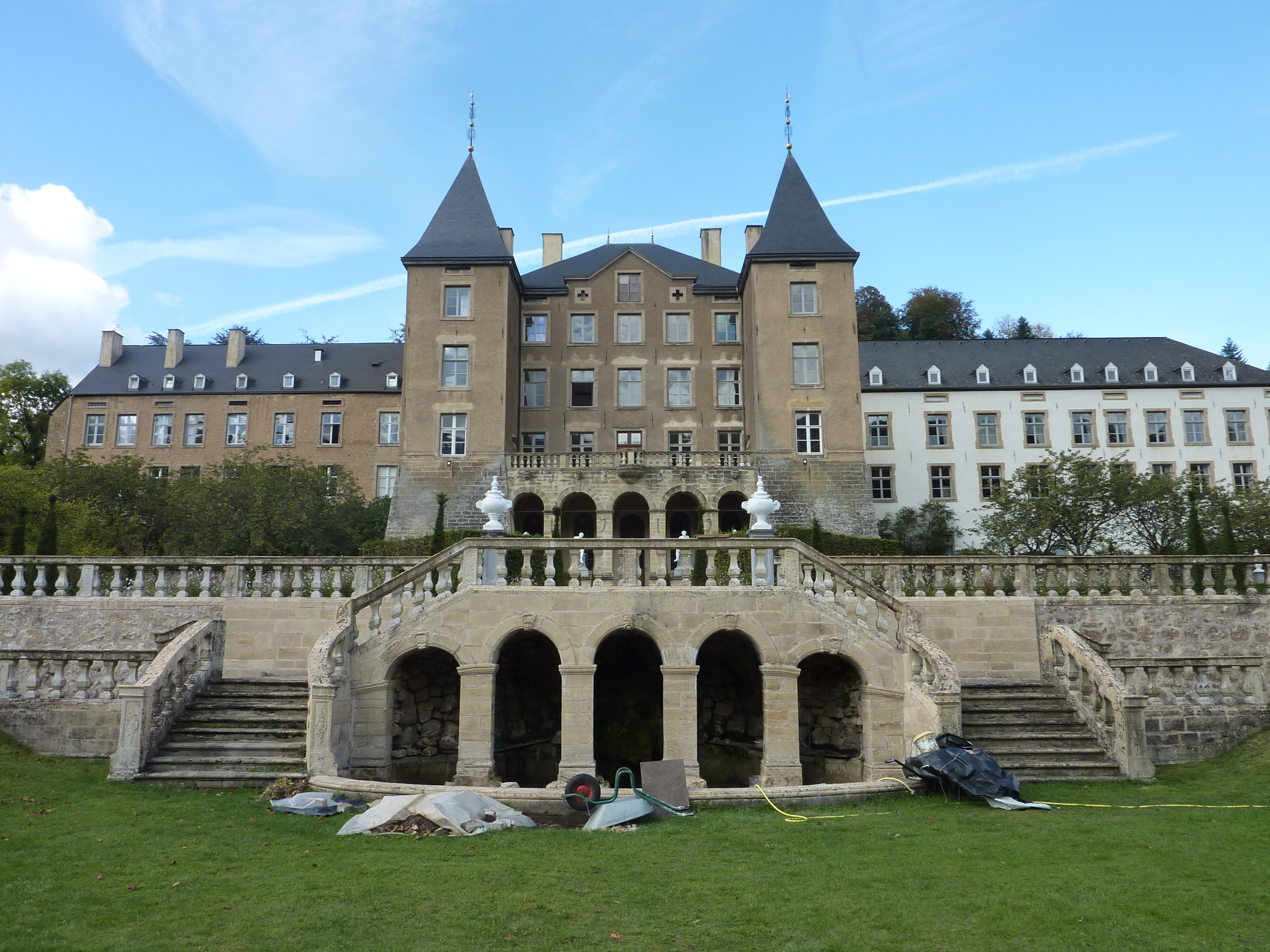
The New Castle of Ansembourg

The New Castle of Ansembourg (French: Grand Château d'Ansembourg), (German: Schloss Ansemburg), in central Luxembourg is one of the castles belonging to the Valley of the Seven Castles. Located about one kilometre or just over half a mile below the Old Castle of Ansembourg, it was built by the industrialist Thomas Bidart in 1639.

== History ==
In 1639, Thomas Bidart built the central part of today's castle as a comfortable house surrounded by walls and towers, two of which still stand. Originally from Liège in Belgium, Bidart, who was a pioneer of Luxembourg's iron and steel industry, named the building Maison des Forges (House of the Ironworks). During the Thirty Years' War, he tapped the region's many water sources and exploited its timber and iron, manufacturing arms at a foundry close to the old castle. As a result, his family prospered, earning rights to the title of Lords of Amsembourg which had belonged to the Raville family until 1671.

It was the de Marchant family who, after inheriting the property by marriage, undertook its astonishing transformation into today's modern-looking castle. In 1719, the courtyard was extended with two wings on either side of the original building. The southern gable was enhanced with a magnificent arch where four statues represent the four continents. Fitted with two small towers, the new façade overlooked the gardens which were connected to the castle through an arcade. The first-floor balcony above the porch provided an excellent view of the gardens, complete with flowerbeds and a fountain. Between 1740 and 1750, Lambert Joseph de Marchant et d'Ansembourg further improved the gardens and extended the buildings on the north side of the main courtyard so that they could be used as stables and lodgings for the castle staff. In 1759, Count Lambert Joseph added the impressive Baroque gateway bearing the arms of de Marchant of Ansembourg and Velbruck.

== The castle today ==
In the fall of 1969 and spring of 1970, the castle hosted a foreign studies program for students from American Colleges and universities. They were St. John's/St. Benedict (Minn.} Mercy College (Detroit), Avila College (Kansas City), St. Leo's College (Fla.) and Southern Illinois University. This cooperative school was named Vita International.Students lived in the newly created dorms on the second floor and in nearby Hollenfels. Classes were a wide variety of Liberal Arts offerings. All of the schools sent professors. Students had complete access to the castle and its furnishings, including the Music Room that had pink gilt furniture and a grand piano. The school closed unexpectedly in the spring of 1970. This sudden closure left many hardships for the students and local citizens of Luxembourg.

Since 1987, the castle has belonged to Sukyo Mahikari, a Japanese new religious organization, which uses the castle as its Europe and Africa regional headquarters. Various ceremonies and seminars are held each year.

Sukyo Mahikari has undertaken substantial renovation work with the assistance of Luxembourg's Service des Sites et Monuments nationaux. Initially work was centred on reinforcing the foundations and walls and on restoring the staircase of honour on the upper terrace in the gardens. From 1999, the statues and the fountains in the garden were repaired while the roofs over the two wings and the central section were rebuilt. Work is now concentrated on restoring the oldest part of the building which dates from the 17th century.

The castle gardens are open to visitors from 9 am every day. The castle also hosts a number of cultural events throughout the year.

== Gallery ==
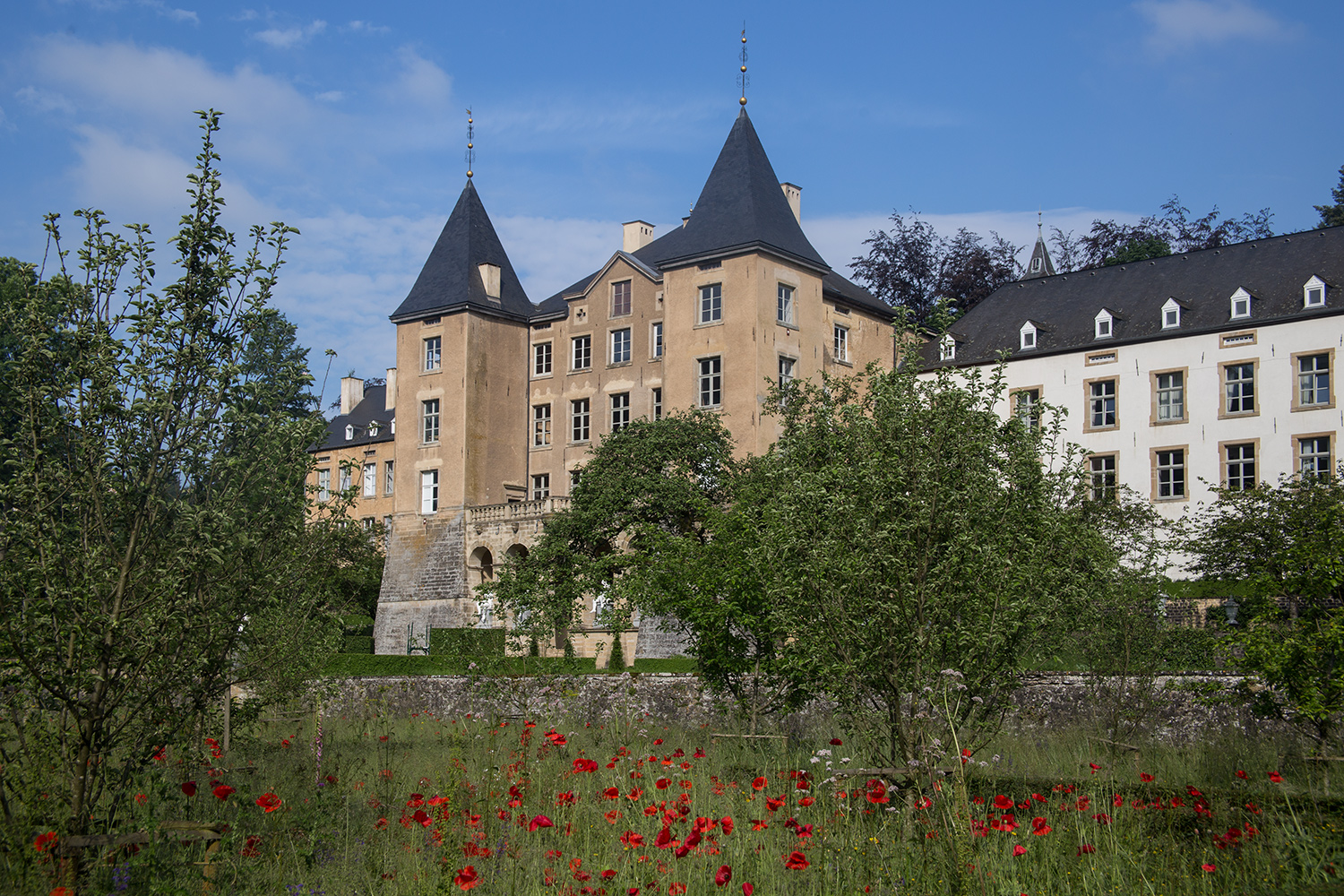
Seen from the garden

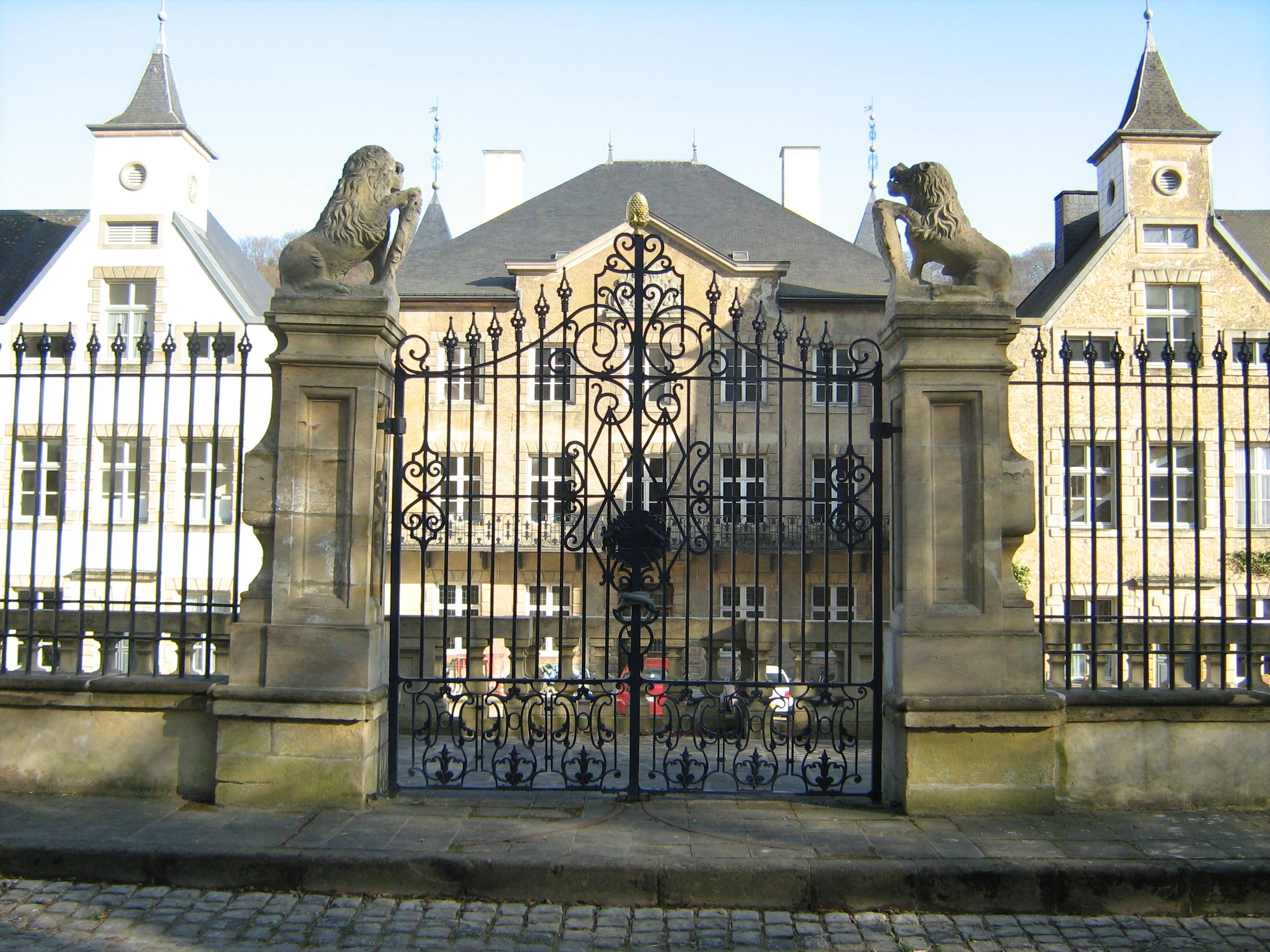
Central entrance gate

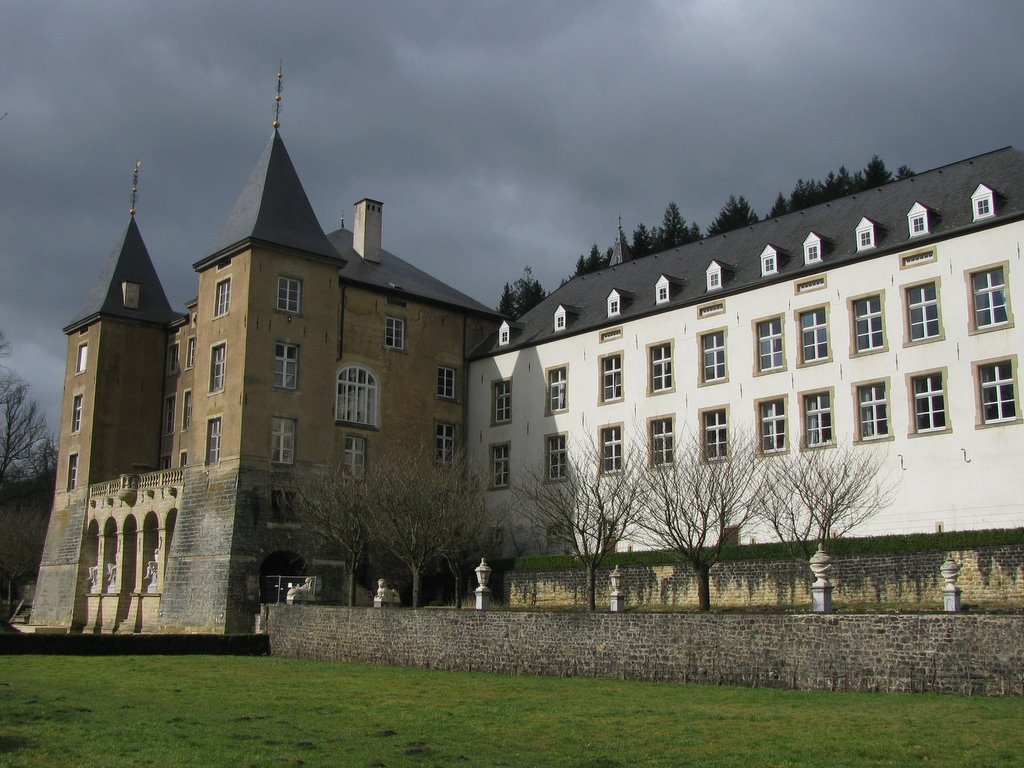
Southern facade

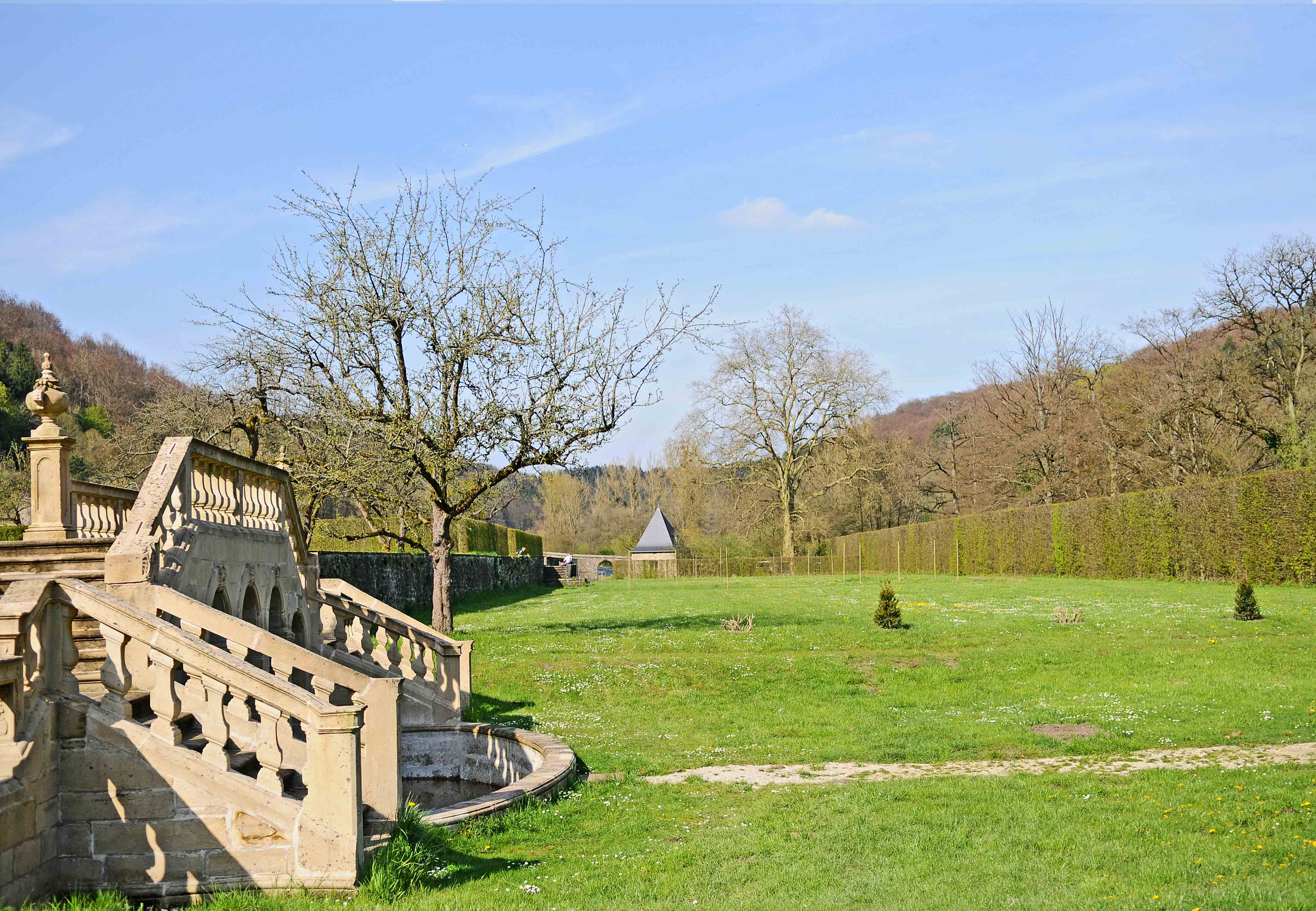
Gardens looking to the east

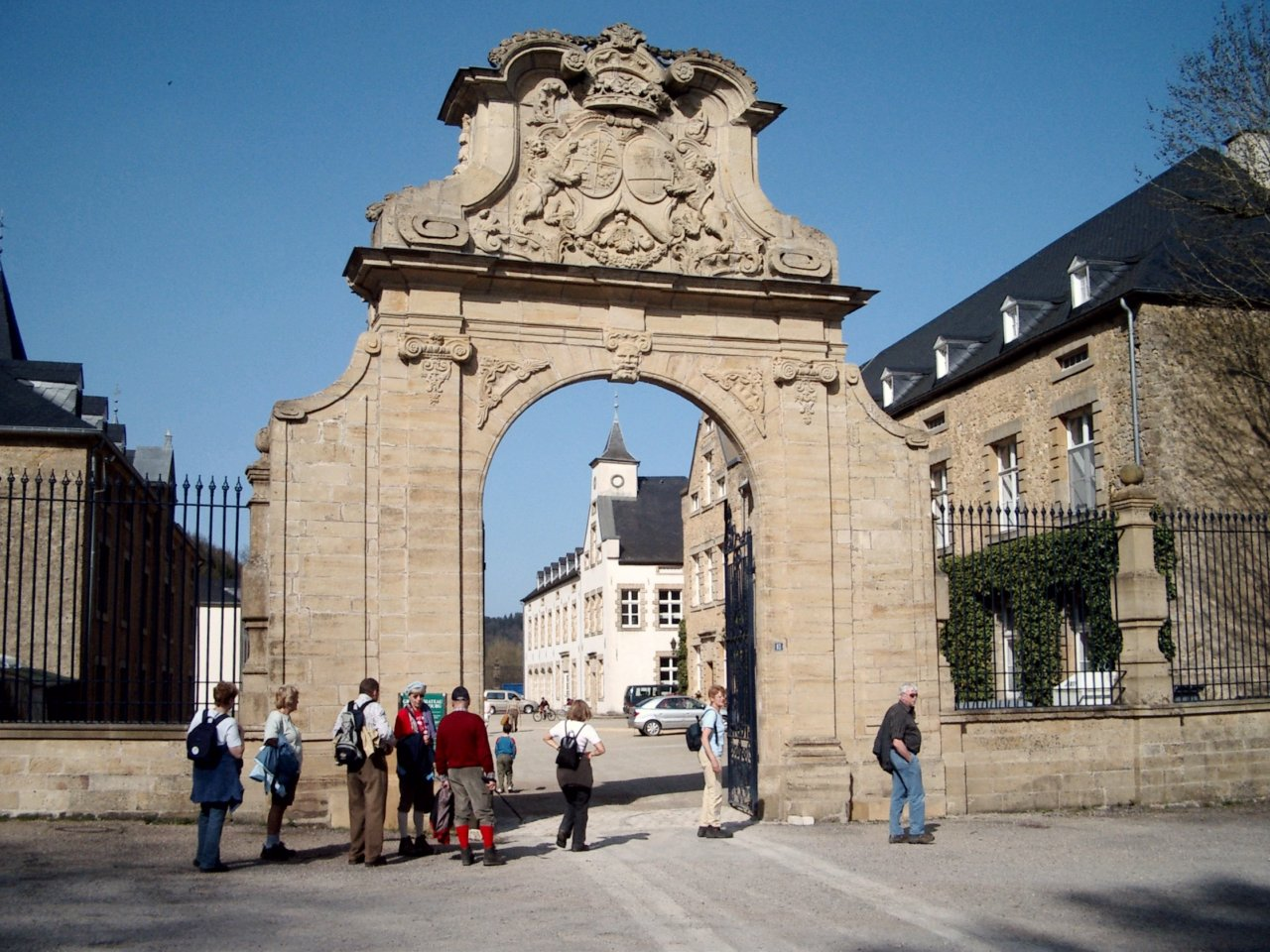
Main gateway

== See also ==
- Ansembourg Castle
- List of castles in Luxembourg
